= 2013 Atlanta City Council election =

Local election in Georgia

- November 5, 2013

The 2013 Atlanta City Council election was held on November 5, 2013 for all 16 seats on the Atlanta City Council. All winners were elected in the first round, with no seats appearing on the runoff ballot for December 3, 2013. It was held concurrently with the 2013 Atlanta mayoral election.

== Council President ==
- Ceasar Mitchell (i), won
- Rachele Fruit

== At-Large Post 1 ==
- Michael Julian Bond (i, unopposed), won

== At-Large Post 2 ==
- Mary Norwood, former councilmember; won
- Aaron Watson (i)

== At-Large Post 3 ==
- Andre Dickens, sales engineer and businessperson; won
- H. Lamar Willis (i)

== District 1 ==
- Carla Smith (i), won
- Bill Powell
- Robert Welsh

== District 2 ==
- Kwanza Hall (i, unopposed), won

== District 3 ==
- Ivory Lee Young Jr. (i), won
- Patricia Harris Crayton
- Darrion Fletcher

== District 4 ==
- Cleta Winslow (i), won
- Torriel "Tory" Lewis

== District 5 ==
- Natalyn Mosby Archibong (i), won
- Christian Enterkin
- Jonathan W. Jones
- John Paul Mitchalik
- Matt Rinker

== District 6 ==
- Alex Wan (i), won
- Tracey Austin
- Mike Boyle

== District 7 ==
- Howard Shook (i), won
- Abid Haque
- Bobby Montgomery

== District 8 ==
- Yolanda Adrean (i, unopposed), won

== District 9 ==
- Felicia Moore (i), won
- Ricardo Mosby
- Duwon "Mooley" Robinson

== District 10 ==
- C. T. Martin (i, unopposed), won

== District 11 ==
- Keisha Lance Bottoms (i), won
- Ron Shakir

== District 12 ==
- Joyce Sheperd (i, unopposed), won
