= 2005 Atlanta City Council election =

Local election in Georgia

- November 8, 2005; December ?, 2005 (runoff)

The 2005 Atlanta City Council election was held on November 8, 2005 for all 16 seats on the Atlanta City Council, with a runoff for several seats on December ?, 2005. It was held concurrently with the 2005 Atlanta mayoral election.

== Council President ==
- Lisa M. Borders (i), won
- Lisa Potash

== At-Large Post 1 ==
- Dwanda Farmer
- Stephen Hull
- Ceasar Mitchell (i), won

== At-Large Post 2 ==
- Mary Norwood (i, unopposed), won

== At-Large Post 3 ==
- H. Lamar Willis (i, unopposed), won

== District 1 ==
- Carla Smith (i, unopposed), won

== District 2 ==
- Al Caproni
- Ben Frierman
- Kwanza Hall, Atlanta Board of Education member, won

== District 3 ==
- Michael Julian Bond
- Ivory Lee Young Jr. (i), won

== District 4 ==
- Darrin Collins
- Kevin Edwards
- Deborah Williams
- Cleta Winslow (i), won
- Sidney Wood

== District 5 ==
- Natalyn Mosby Archibong (i, unopposed), won

== District 6 ==
- Steve Brodie
- Anne Fauver, won

== District 7 ==
- Howard Shook (i), won

== District 8 ==
- Clair Muller (i), won
- Justin H. Wiedeman

== District 9 ==
- Felicia Moore, won

== District 10 ==
- C. T. Martin (i), won
- Montrell L. Walker

== District 11 ==
- John Eaves
- Jim Maddox (i), won

== District 12 ==
- Derrick Boazman, former councilmember
- Joyce Sheperd (i), won
- Keisha Waites
