= 2001 Atlanta City Council election =

Local election in Georgia

- November 8, 2001; November 27, 2001 (runoff)

The 2001 Atlanta City Council election was held on November 8, 2001 for all 16 seats on the Atlanta City Council, with a runoff for several seats on November 27, 2001. It was held concurrently with the 2001 Atlanta mayoral election.

== Council President ==
- Michael Julian Bond
- Julia Emmons
- Morris Finley
- Mable Thomas
- Cathy Woolard, won

== At-Large Post 1 ==
- Dwanda Farmer
- Ceasar Mitchell, won
- Keisha Waites
- Paul Zucca

== At-Large Post 2 ==
- Bill Costa
- Mary Norwood, won
- Dave G. Walker
- Sidney Wood

== At-Large Post 3 ==
- Khadijah Abdur-Rahman
- Pamela Alexander
- Dozier Smith
- H. Lamar Willis, won

== District 1 ==
- Ruthie Garrett-Walls
- Malcolm Gideons
- Nana S. Nyarko
- William Perry
- Carla Smith, won

== District 2 ==
- Dewey Clark
- David Powell
- Debi Starnes (i), won
- Jan Wyche

== District 3 ==
- Byron Amos
- Raymond L. Davis
- Vince Phillips
- Hiram Scott
- Ivory Lee Young Jr., won

== District 4 ==
- Kim Andrews
- Terri Phipps Copeland
- Benjamin Hines
- Georgianne Thomas
- Cleta Winslow (i), won

== District 5 ==
- Natalyn Mosby Archibong, won
- Sherry Dorsey (i)

== District 6 ==
- Warren A. Bruno
- Anne Fauver, won
- Jannie Gerds

== District 7 ==
- Katy Bryant
- Drew Evangelista
- Howard Shook, won

== District 8 ==
- Clair Muller (i), won

== District 9 ==
- Stanley Calloway
- Felicia Moore (i), won
- Rick Mosby

== District 10 ==
- C. T. Martin (i), won

== District 11 ==
- Jim Maddox (i), won

== District 12 ==
- Derrick Boazman (i), won
- John Martin
