= 2021 Atlanta City Council election =

Local election in Georgia

- November 2, 2021; November 30, 2021 (runoff)

The 2021 Atlanta City Council election was held on November 2, 2021 for all 16 seats on the Atlanta City Council, with a runoff for several seats on November 30, 2021. It was held concurrently with the 2021 Atlanta mayoral election.

== Council President ==
- Natalyn Mosby Archibong
- Courtney English
- Sam Manuel
- Mike Russell
- Doug Shipman, won

== At-Large Post 1 ==
- Michael Julian Bond, won
- Alfred Brooks
- Brandon Cory Goldberg
- Todd A. Gray
- Jereme Sharpe

== At-Large Post 2 ==
- Sonya Russell-Ofchus
- Matt Westmoreland (I), won

== At-Large Post 3 ==
- Jacki Labat
- Ralph Long
- Jodi Merriday
- Keisha Waites, won
- Sherry B. Williams

== District 1 ==
- Clarence Blalock
- Nathan Clubb
- Russell Hopson
- Kelly-Jeanne Lee
- Victor D. Tate
- Jason Winston, won

== District 2 ==
- Amir Farokhi (I), won

== District 3 ==
- Byron Amos, won
- Erika Estrada
- Brandon Graham
- Keona Jones
- Elijah Porter
- Ken Wainwright

== District 4 ==
- Rogelio Arcila
- Larry B. Carter II
- Jason Dozier, won
- Kim Scott
- DeBorah Williams
- Cleta Winslow (I)

== District 5 ==
- Samuel Bacote
- Liliana Bakhtiari, won
- Katrina Kissel
- Amanda Mahoney
- Doug Williams

== District 6 ==
- Courtney Jenee DeDi
- Kathryn Voelpel
- Alex Wan, won

== District 7 ==
- Howard Shook (I), won

== District 8 ==
- Mary Norwood, won

== District 9 ==
- Dustin Hillis (I), won
- Devin Ward

== District 10 ==
- Andrea L. Boone (I), won
- Jason Hudgins

== District 11 ==
- Marci Collier Overstreet (I), won
- Ron Shakir

== District 12 ==
- Antonio Lewis, won
- Joyce Sheperd (I)
- Jenne Shepherd
