= 2009 Atlanta City Council election =

Local election in Georgia

- November 3, 2009; December 1, 2009 (runoff)

The 2009 Atlanta City Council election was held on November 3, 2009 for all 16 seats on the Atlanta City Council, with a runoff for several seats on December 1, 2009. It was held concurrently with the 2009 Atlanta mayoral election.

== Council President ==
=== Declared candidates ===
- Ceasar C. Mitchell
- Clair McLeod Muller
- Dave Gregory Walker.

2009 Atlanta City Council election, Council President
Candidate	Votes	%
Caesar Mitchell	33,453	48.67
Clair Muller	28,737	41.81
Dave Walker	6,326	9.20
Write-in votes	222	0.32
Total votes	68,738	100.00

=== Runoff candidates ===
- Ceasar C. Mitchell
- Clair McLeod Muller

2009 Atlanta City Council election, Council President
Candidate	Votes	%
Caesar Mitchell	39,233	55.05
Clair Muller	32,031	44.95

== At-Large Post 1 ==
=== Declared candidates ===
- Michael Julian Bond, won
- Adam Brackman
- Dwanda Farmer
- Chris Vaughan

== At-Large Post 2 ==
=== Declared candidates ===
- Amir Farokhi
- Weslee Knapp
- Aaron Watson, won

== At-Large Post 3 ==
=== Declared candidates ===
- Shelitha Robertson
- H. Lamar Willis, won

== District 1 ==
=== Declared candidates ===
- Carla Smith (unopposed), won

== District 2 ==
=== Declared candidates ===
- Kwanza Hall (unopposed), won

== District 3 ==
=== Declared candidates ===
- Ivory Lee Young Jr., won
- Darrion Fletcher

== District 4 ==
=== Declared candidates ===
- Cleta Winslow, won
- Lashawn M. Hoffman
- Deborah Williams
- Sidney Wood

== District 5 ==
=== Declared candidates ===
- Natalyn Mosby Archibong (i, unopposed), won

== District 6 ==
=== Declared candidates ===
- Bahareh Azizi
- Steve Brodie
- Tad Christian
- Liz Coyle
- Miguel Gallegos
- Alex Wan, won

== District 7 ==
=== Declared candidates ===
- Howard Shook (unopposed), won

== District 8 ==
=== Declared candidates ===
- Yolanda Adrean, won
- Richard Coleman Jr

== District 9 ==
=== Declared candidates ===
- Felicia Moore (unopposed), won

== District 10 ==
=== Declared candidates ===
- C. T. Martin (unopposed), won

== District 11 ==
=== Declared candidates ===
- Keisha Lance Bottoms, won
- Ray Abram
- Johnny Dixon
- A. Reginald Eaves
- Morris Finley
- Silas G. Kevil
- Edith Ladipo
- Alvelyn Sanders
- Juanita M. Smith

== District 12 ==
=== Declared candidates ===
- Joyce Sheperd, won
- Curtis Davis Jr.
- Keisha Waites
