= 2025 Atlanta City Council election =

Local election in Georgia

- November 4, 2025

The 2025 Atlanta City Council election was held on November 4, 2025, to elect all sixteen members of the Atlanta City Council, the lawmaking body of Atlanta, Georgia. The election was held concurrently with those for mayor and school board, as well as the special election for the Georgia Public Service Commission.

== Council president ==
Rohit Malhotra and Marci Collier Overstreet ran to be city council president. Overstreet won the election.

== At-large post 1 ==
=== Candidates ===
==== Declared ====
- Michael Julian Bond, incumbent councilmember
- Juan Mendoza, banker
- Matt Rinker, neighborhood President and candidate for the 5th district in 2013

=== Endorsements ===
Michael Julian Bond

U.S. Representatives

- Nikema Williams, GA-05 (2021–present)

Organizations

- Atlanta-North Georgia Labor Council
Juan Mendoza

Organizations

- New American Leaders Action Fund
Matt Rinker

Organizations

- Georgia Conservation Voters
- LGBTQ Victory Fund

=== Results ===
2025 Atlanta City Council election, at-large post 1
Candidate	Votes	%
Michael Julian Bond (incumbent)	57,947	58.49
Juan Mendoza	20,803	21.00
Matt Rinker	20,322	20.51
Total votes	99,072	100.00

== At-large post 2 ==
=== Candidates ===
==== Declared ====
- Matt Westmoreland, incumbent councilmember

=== Results ===
2025 Atlanta City Council election, at-large post 2
Candidate	Votes	%
Matt Westmoreland (incumbent)	89,900	100.00
Total votes	89,900	100.00

== At-large post 3 ==
=== Candidates ===
==== Declared ====
- Eshé Collins, incumbent councilmember

=== Results ===
2025 Atlanta City Council election, at-large post 3
Candidate	Votes	%
Eshé Collins (incumbent)	88,787	100.00
Total votes	88,787	100.00

== District 1 ==
=== Candidates ===
==== Declared ====
- Jason Winston, incumbent councilmember

=== Results ===
2025 Atlanta City Council election, district 1
Candidate	Votes	%
Jason Winston (incumbent)	8,071	100.00
Total votes	8,071	100.00

== District 2 ==
=== Candidates ===
==== Declared ====
- Kelsea Bond, community organizer
- Jacob Chambers, software engineer
- Alex Bevel Jones, entrepreneur
- Courtney Smith, local neighborhood organization leader
- James White, prosecutor

==== Disqualified ====
- Rod Mack

==== Declined ====
- Amir Farokhi, incumbent councilmember (resigned)

=== Endorsements ===
Kelsea Bond

U.S. Representatives

- Nikema Williams, GA-05 (2021–present)

Organizations

- Democratic Socialists of America Atlanta chapter
- Georgia Conservation Voters
- International Union of Painters and Allied Trades Local 77
- LGBTQ Victory Fund
- Run for Something
- Teamsters Local 528
- IATSE Local 161

Political parties

- Georgia Working Families Party
Courtney Smith

Organizations

- Atlanta Professional Firefighters IAFF Local 134

=== Results ===
2025 Atlanta City Council election, district 2
Candidate	Votes	%
Kelsea Bond	6,715	64.00
Courtney Smith	2,154	20.53
Alex Bevel Jones	934	8.90
Jacob Chambers	421	4.01
James White	268	2.55
Total votes	10,492	100.00

== District 3 ==
=== Candidates ===
==== Declared ====
- Byron Amos, incumbent councilmember
- Perrin Bostic, former outreach representative for U.S. Senator Raphael Warnock

=== Endorsements ===
Perrin Bostic

Political parties

- Georgia Working Families Party

=== Results ===
2025 Atlanta City Council election, district 3
Candidate	Votes	%
Byron Amos (incumbent)	2,773	59.25
Perrin Bostic	1,907	40.75
Total votes	4,680	100.00

== District 4 ==
=== Candidates ===
==== Declared ====
- Jason Dozier, incumbent councilmember
- DeBorah Williams, nonprofit founder

=== Endorsements ===
Jason Dozier

Political parties

- Georgia Working Families Party

=== Results ===
2025 Atlanta City Council election, district 4
Candidate	Votes	%
Jason Dozier (incumbent)	3,781	68.96
DeBorah Williams	1,702	31.04
Total votes	5,483	100.00

== District 5 ==
=== Candidates ===
==== Declared ====
- Liliana Bakhtiari, incumbent councilmember

=== Endorsements ===
Liliana Bakhtiari

Political parties

- Georgia Working Families Party

=== Results ===
2025 Atlanta City Council election, district 5
Candidate	Votes	%
Liliana Bakhtiari (incumbent)	13,369	100.00
Total votes	13,369	100.00

== District 6 ==
=== Candidates ===
==== Declared ====
- Alex Wan, incumbent councilmember

=== Results ===
2025 Atlanta City Council election, district 6
Candidate	Votes	%
Alex Wan (incumbent)	8,610	100.00
Total votes	8,610	100.00

== District 7 ==
=== Candidates ===
==== Declared ====
- Jamie Christy, attorney
- Allen Daly
- Thad Flowers, former city council district chief of staff
- Rebecca King, advocate
- Thomas Worthy, Piedmont Healthcare's Chief Public Policy Officer

==== Declined ====
- Howard Shook, incumbent councilmember

=== Results ===
2025 Atlanta City Council election, district 7
Candidate	Votes	%
Thomas Worthy	1,913	27.18
Thad Flowers	1,857	26.39
Jamie Christy	1,357	19.28
Rebecca King	1,181	16.78
Allen Daly	729	10.36
Total votes	7,037	100.00

=== Runoff results ===
As no candidate received a majority of the vote, a runoff election between Thomas Worthy and Thad Flowers took place on December 2.

2025 Atlanta City Council election, district 7 runoff
Candidate	Votes	%
Thomas Worthy	1,569	59.32%
Thad Flowers	1,076	40.68%
Total votes	2,645	100.00

== District 8 ==
=== Candidates ===
==== Declared ====
- Mary Norwood, incumbent councilmember

=== Results ===
2025 Atlanta City Council election, district 8
Candidate	Votes	%
Mary Norwood (incumbent)	7,611	100.00
Total votes	7,611	100.00

== District 9 ==
=== Candidates ===
==== Declared ====
- Charles Bourgeois, advocate
- Dustin Hillis, incumbent councilmember

=== Results ===
2025 Atlanta City Council election, district 9
Candidate	Votes	%
Dustin Hillis (incumbent)	4,819	59.33
Charles Bourgeois	3,304	40.67
Total votes	8,123	100.00

== District 10 ==
=== Candidates ===
==== Declared ====
- Andrea Boone, incumbent councilmember

=== Results ===
2025 Atlanta City Council election, district 10
Candidate	Votes	%
Andrea Boone (incumbent)	8,390	100.00
Total votes	8,390	100.00

== District 11 ==
=== Candidates ===
==== Declared ====
- Toni Belin-Ingram, church leader
- Andre Burgin, park resident association co-chair
- Curt Collier, educator
- Steven Dingle, teacher
- Harold Hardnett, entrepreneur
- Nate Jester, attorney
- Wayne Martin, corporate executive
- Reginald Rushin, businessman

==== Disqualified ====
- Keith Lewis
- Sherry Williams

==== Declined ====
- Marci Collier Overstreet, incumbent councilmember (running for council president)

=== Results ===
2025 Atlanta City Council election, district 11
Candidate	Votes	%
Wayne Martin	3,028	33.23
Nate Jester	1,885	20.69
Toni Belin-Ingram	1,447	15.88
Harold Hardnett	931	10.22
Andre Burgin	572	6.28
Reginald Rushin	550	6.04
Curt Collier	385	4.23
Steven Dingle	313	3.44
Total votes	9,111	100.00

=== Runoff results ===
As no candidate received a majority of the vote, a runoff election between Wayne Martin and Nate Jester took place on December 2.

2025 Atlanta City Council election, district 11 runoff
Candidate	Votes	%
Wayne Martin	2,189	57.96%
Nate Jester	1,588	42.04%
Total votes	3,777	100.00

== District 12 ==
=== Candidates ===
==== Declared ====
- Delvin Davis, resident
- Stephanie Flowers, community organizer
- Antonio Lewis, incumbent councilmember

=== Results ===
2025 Atlanta City Council election, district 12
Candidate	Votes	%
Antonio Lewis (incumbent)	4,234	57.97
Stephanie Flowers	2,270	31.08
Delvin Davis	800	10.95
Total votes	7,304	100.00
