= Atlanta's 12th City Council district =

Atlanta's 12th City Council district is one of the twelve geographic districts in the Atlanta City Council. It is represented by Antonio Lewis since 2022, who was elected in the 2021 Atlanta City Council election and defeated incumbent Joyce Sheperd.

The district was created in 1973 after a new city charter was passed, which replaced the former at-large six-member Board of Aldermen with a 15-member City Council of 12 districts and 6 (later 3) at-large posts.

== List of councilmembers ==
- Hugh Pierce (1974–1978)
- Dozier Smith (1978–1994)
- Gloria Bromell Tinubu (1994–1997)
- Derrick Boazman (1997–2004)
- Joyce Sheperd (2004–2022)
- Antonio Lewis (2022–present)
