= Atlanta's 8th City Council district =

Atlanta's 8th City Council district is one of the twelve geographic districts in the Atlanta City Council. It is represented by Mary Norwood since 2022, who was elected in the 2021 Atlanta City Council election to succeed J. P. Matzigkeit.

The district was created in 1973 after a new city charter was passed, which replaced the former at-large six-member Board of Aldermen with a 15-member City Council of 12 districts and 6 (later 3) at-large posts. A previous Eighth Ward existed in various forms from 1854 to 1954.

== List of aldermen (1854-1974) ==
=== 1935 ===
==== Aldermen ====
- Raleigh Drennon
- O. Lee White

=== 1954 ===
- Jesse Draper

== List of councilmembers (1974–present) ==
- Richard Guthman
- Clair Muller (1990–2010)
- Yolanda Adrean (2010–2018)
- J. P. Matzigkeit (2018–2022)
- Mary Norwood (2022–present)
