= Henry Lumpkin Wilson =

American physician

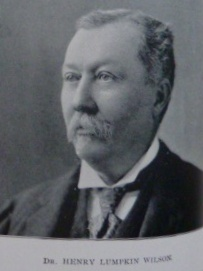
Dr. Henry Lumpkin Wilson

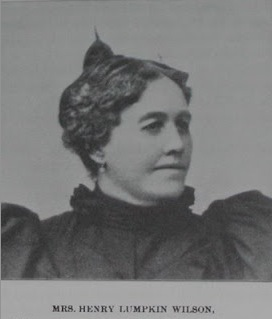
Mrs. Henry Lumpkin Wilson

Dr. Henry Lumpkin Wilson (July 2, 1839 in Danville, Virginia – September 21, 1917 in Atlanta) was an American physician, city councilman, and was active in the city of Atlanta's expansion and development.

Dr. Wilson was born in Danville, Virginia in 1839 and came to Atlanta in 1853. He graduated from Emory College at the original Oxford campus in 1858. He then became a doctor at Atlanta Medical College and was appointed as city physician. He served in the Confederate army and was made chief surgeon of the conscript department of Georgia. In 1872 he was elected to Atlanta City Council. He was chairman of the street committee and helped improved Whitehall, Marietta and Peachtree Streets. He was elected to the Fulton County commissioner in 1886 and was chairman of the committee of public works.

Soon after 1885 he opened a drug store at the corner of Broad and Marietta Streets.

After selling his drug business he entered the real estate business to become "one of the largest and boldest real estate men of the South", long in partnership with Frank P. Rice. in 1883 he was an incorporator of the Fulton County Street Railroad which brought horsecar service to Ponce de Leon Springs. Wilson is credited with giving the Springs their name. The line would later become the Nine-Mile Circle electric streetcar which would make accessible and thus enable the development of what is today Virginia-Highland and adjacent neighborhoods. Indeed, in 1914, Wilson sold 65 acres which would be subdivided into Boulevard Park, one of the original subdivisions of today's Virginia Highland.

He was also a director of the Cotton States and International Exposition Company.

Wilson was described as a "stubby blond man of medium height with a brusque manner and a quick keen glance". At one point Wilson resided in a grand house on Peachtree Street in today's Midtown Atlanta near the intersection of 5th Street.

He died in 1917 and was buried in Oakland Cemetery (Atlanta, Georgia).

== Family ==
In 1895, Wilson's wife Mary Elizabeth, née Monk compiled a cookbook that would later become known as the Atlanta Exposition Cookbook, a souvenir for women who visited the 1895 Cotton States and International Exposition.

Their son was W. T. Wilson who served on the Rhode Island Optometry Board.
