= Atlanta's 6th City Council district =

Atlanta's 6th City Council district is one of the twelve geographic districts in the Atlanta City Council. It is currently represented by Alex Wan since 2022, who was elected to a nonconsecutive term to succeed Jennifer Ide.

The district was created in 1973 after a new city charter was passed, which replaced the former at-large six-member Board of Aldermen with a 15-member City Council of 12 districts and 6 (later 3) at-large posts. A previous Sixth Ward existed in various forms from 1854 to 1954.

== List of aldermen ==
=== 1935 ===
==== Councilmembers ====
- Howard Haire
- Ralph A. Huie

=== 1954 ===
- Cecil Turner (Position 2, 1961-1973)
- J. M. Flanigan

== List of councilmembers ==
- Nick Lambros (1974–1978)
- Mary Davis (1978–1998)
- Cathy Woolard (1998–2002)
- Anne Fauver (2002–2010)
- Alex Wan (2010–2018)
- Jennifer N. Ide (2018–2022)
- Alex Wan (2022–present)
