= 1973 Atlanta City Council election =

- October 2, 1973; October 16, 1973 (runoff)

The 1973 Atlanta City Council took place on October 2, 1973, to elect the Atlanta City Council, which was the first election since the replacement of the six-member Atlanta Board of Aldermen with the 19-member City Council (which was formalized by a 1974 Charter Review Commission). The election took place concurrently with the 1973 Atlanta mayoral election. A runoff for several seats was held on October 16, 1973.

In the same election, Atlanta voters elected Alderman Wyche Fowler as President of the Atlanta City Council. Fowler defeated Reverend Hosea Williams in a runoff election. In the primary election, Fowler and Williams finished first and second, respectively, followed by former Alderman Wade Mitchell and Rector Robert B. Hunter.

The 1973 election saw a rise in the influence of African-American politicians in Atlanta. Five new black City Council members were added to create a 9–9 split, while two black women were elected to the Atlanta Board of Education for a 5-4 black majority.

== Council President ==
=== Declared candidates ===
- Joel Aber
- Wyche Fowler, lawyer, former chief of staff for congressmember Charles L. Weltner
- Robert B. Hunter, clergyman, rector of St. Paul's Episcopal Church
- Wade Mitchell, incumbent alderman, banker
- Cecil Turner, incumbent alderman, real estate lawyer
- Hosea Williams, civil rights activist and research chemist

=== Runoff candidates ===
- Wyche Folwer, won
- Hosea Williams

== District 1 ==
=== Declared candidates ===
- John H. Calhoun, civil rights activist — won
- John Releford

== District 2 ==
=== Declared candidates ===
- Charles Helms, Presbyterian clergymember
- Sam Sheats, barber
- Samuel Lee Stephens

=== Runoff candidates ===
- Charles Helms, won
- Sam Sheats

== District 3 ==
=== Declared candidates ===
- Eunice Cooper
- John Daniels
- James Howard
- Frank "Sonny" Jones
- Tillman Ward
- J. Lowell Ware, publisher of Atlanta Voice

=== Runoff candidates ===
- Eunice Cooper
- James Howard, won

== District 4 ==
=== Declared candidates ===
- James Bond
- Malcolm J. Dean
- Mildred Glover
- Ethel M. Mathews
- Jesse Williams

=== Runoff candidates ===
- James Bond, won
- Mildred Glover

== District 5 ==
=== Declared candidates ===
- Morris Finley, won
- Charles Turner

== District 6 ==
=== Declared candidates ===
- Edward G. Hartline
- Tom Houck, civil rights activist
- Nick G. Lambros, incumbent alderman, former state representative — won

== District 7 ==
=== Declared candidates ===
- Ray Abernathy
- George Cotsakis
- Roger Kelton
- Frank Salley
- Hank Schwab

=== Runoff candidates ===
- Ray Abernathy
- George Cotsakis, won

== District 8 ==
=== Declared candidates ===
- Tom Corish
- Richard Guthman, banker
- C. J. Lynch
- G. Everett Millican, incumbent alderman

=== Runoff candidates ===
- Richard Guthman, won
- G. Everett Millican

== District 9 ==
=== Declared candidates ===
- Brady Barnett Jr.
- Robert "Bob" Lane
- Arthur Langford Jr., Baptist clergymember — won

== District 10 ==
=== Declared candidates ===
- Lorenzo Benn, businessman
- Gloria Thomas Borders
- Ira Jackson, won
- Cecil Mc? McLean
- Ryburn G. Stephens
- Calvin Thornton

== District 11 ==
=== Declared candidates ===
- James F. Maddox Sr.
- Carl Ware

=== Runoff candidates ===
- James F. Maddox Sr.
- Carl Ware, won

== District 12 ==
=== Runoff candidates ===
- Hugh Pierce, won
- Cozier Smith

== At-Large Post 13 ==
=== Runoff candidates ===
- E. Gregory Griggs, won
- Robb Pitts

== At-Large Post 14 ==
=== Declared candidates ===
- Marvin S. Arrington Sr., won

== At-Large Post 15 ==
=== Declared candidates ===
- Panke Bradley, won
- H. D. Dodson

== At-Large Post 16 ==
=== Declared candidates ===
- Chuck Driebe
- Buddy Fowlkes, won

== At-Large 17 ==
=== Declared candidates ===
- Q. V. Williamson, won

== At-Large 18 ==
=== Declared candidates ===
- Jack Summers, won
