= Elizabeth Morrison =

Elizabeth Morrison or Morison or their shortened versions may refer to:

- Elizabeth Morrison (Hollyoaks), a fictional character in the British TV soap Hollyoaks
- Miss Elizabeth Morison, a fictional character played by Wendy Hiller in the 1981 film Miss Morison's Ghosts
- Liz Morrison, a fictional character in the Doctor Who audio drama UNIT Dominion
- Lizzie Morrison, a fictional character in the 2004 film Dear Frankie
- Betty Morrison, candidate in the Atlanta mayoral election, 1973

== See also ==
- Beth Morrison (disambiguation)
