= Senator Rice =

Senator Rice may refer to:

== Members of the United States Senate ==
- Benjamin F. Rice (1828–1905), U.S. Senator from Arkansas from 1868 to 1873
- Henry Mower Rice (1816–1894), U.S. Senator from Minnesota from 1858 to 1863

== United States state senate members ==
- Abbott Barnes Rice (1862–1926), Massachusetts State Senate
- Albert E. Rice (1845–1921), Minnesota State Senate
- Andrew Rice (born 1973), Oklahoma State Senate
- Edmund Rice (politician) (1819–1889), Minnesota State Senate
- Frank P. Rice (1838–1923), Georgia State Senate
- George Merrick Rice (1808–1894), Massachusetts
- Harvey Rice (1800–1891), Ohio State Senate
- Jacob Rice (New York politician) (1847–1930), New York State Senate
- Jim Rice (Idaho politician) (fl. 2010s), Idaho State Senate
- John A. Rice (politician) (1832–?), Wisconsin State Senate
- John S. Rice (1899–1985), Pennsylvania State Senate
- Ronald Rice (born 1945), New Jersey State Senate
- Samuel Farrow Rice (1816–1890), Alabama State Senate
- Terry Rice (born 1954), Arkansas State Senate
- Thomas Rice (1734) (1734–1812), Massachusetts State Senate

== Members of the Australian Senate ==
- Janet Rice (born 1960), Australian Senator for Victoria from 2014 to present
