= Atlanta's 7th City Council district =

Atlanta's 7th City Council district is one of the twelve geographic districts in the Atlanta City Council. It will be represented by Thomas Worthy from 2026, who was elected in the 2025 Atlanta City Council election to succeed Howard Shook.

The district was created in 1973 after a new city charter was passed, which replaced the former at-large six-member Board of Aldermen with a 15-member City Council of 12 districts and 6 (later 3) at-large posts. A previous Seventh Ward existed in various forms from 1854 to 1954.

== List of aldermen ==
=== 1935 ===
==== Councilmembers ====
- R. M. "Bob" Clark

== List of councilmembers (1974–present) ==
- George Cotsakis (1974–1977)
- Buddy Fowlkes (1977–1994)
- Lee Morris (1994–2001)
- Howard Shook (2002–2026)
- Thomas Worthy (2026–present)
