= Lisa Borders =

American politician

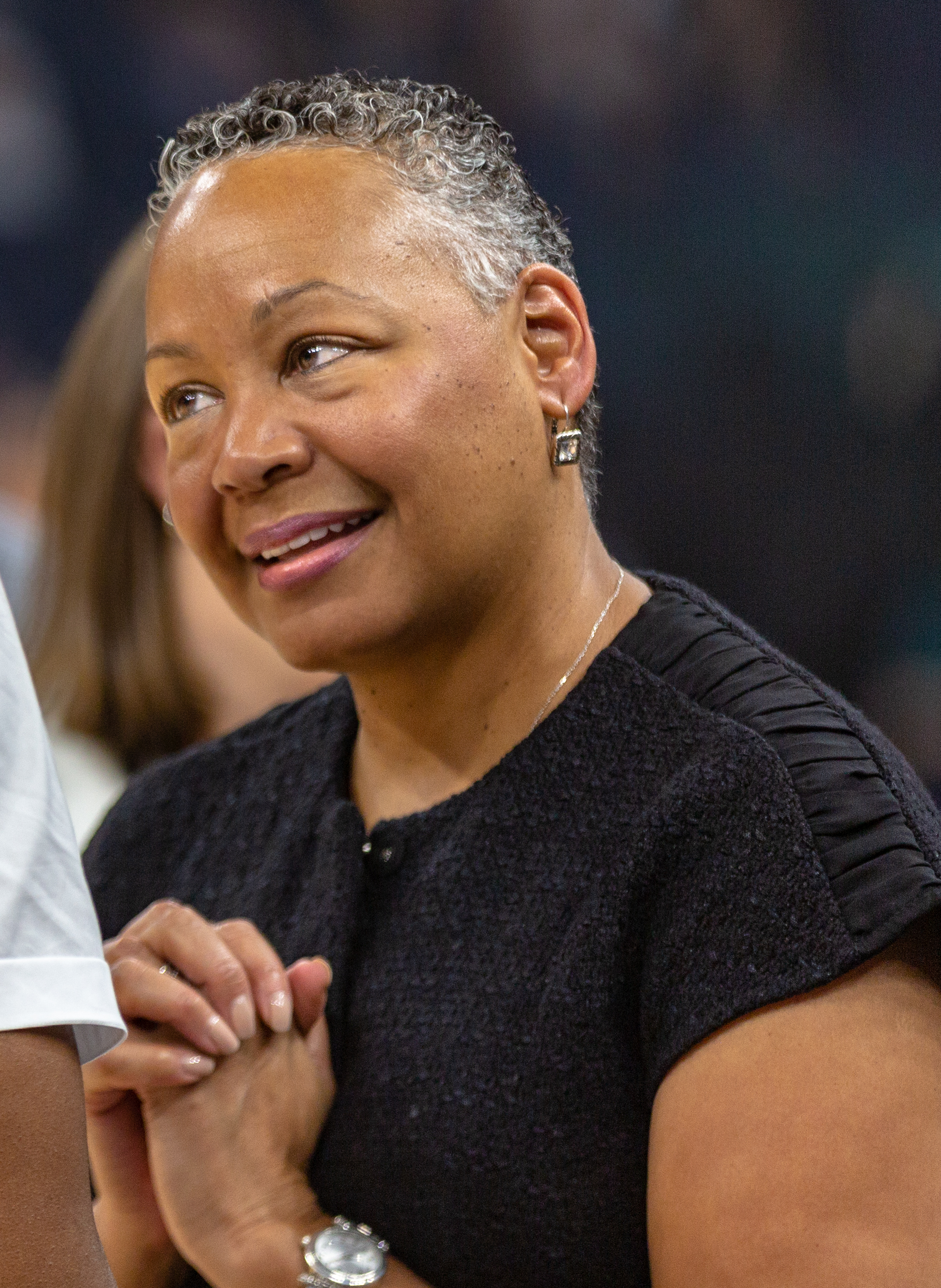
- Lisa Borders at WNBA game in 2018

4th President of the WNBA
- In office February 10, 2016 – October 2, 2018
- Preceded by: Laurel J. Richie
- Succeeded by: Mark Tatum (interim)

President of the Atlanta City Council
- In office August 16, 2004 – January 4, 2010
- Preceded by: Cathy Woolard
- Succeeded by: Ceasar Mitchell

Personal details
- Born: November 25, 1957 (age 68) Atlanta, Georgia, U.S.
- Relations: William Holmes Borders (grandfather)
- Education: Duke University; University of Colorado

Lisa Michelle Borders (born November 25, 1957) is the former president and chief executive officer of Time's Up and former president of the Women's National Basketball Association (WNBA).

== Early life and education ==
Lisa Borders was born on November 25th in 1957 in Atlanta, Georgia. She attended Atlanta Public Schools, and later The Westminster Schools in 1965 after her parents wanted a more academically challenging environment for her. At Westminster, she was one of seven African-American students on campus and fellow students were often hostile.

Borders is the granddaughter of civil rights leader Rev. William Holmes Borders, pastor of Atlanta's Wheat Street Baptist Church.

Borders obtained a bachelor's degree from Duke University and a Masters of Science in health administration from the University of Colorado. She serves on the Duke University Board of Trustees. As an undergraduate, she joined Alpha Kappa Alpha sorority.

== Career ==
Borders was the president of the Henry W. Grady Health System Foundation where she led a five-year, $325 million capital campaign before serving with the Atlanta City Council. From 2004 to 2010, she was president of the Atlanta City Council of Atlanta, Georgia, having been elected at-large in an August 10, 2004 special election, her first run for public office. After being sworn in on August 16, 2004, her duties included presiding over and maintaining relationships with the city government. She was a candidate for mayor of Atlanta in 2009. On November 11, 2009, Borders endorsed mayoral candidate Kasim Reed for the runoff election, occurring between Reed and Mary Norwood on December 1, 2009. Borders was succeeded in office by Ceasar Mitchell.

In 2010, Borders became a founding leader of No Labels, a 501(c)(4) citizens movement of Republicans, Democrats and Independents whose mission is to address the politics of problem solving.

Borders was the vice president of global community affairs at The Coca-Cola Company before becoming the fourth president of the Women's National Basketball Association (WNBA) on February 10, 2016. As president, she established live streaming games on Twitter and launched the WNBA's one-day fantasy game. In 2017, the league recorded its highest attendance rate and the season was its most-watched in four years. She also served as the league's public face, hosting press conferences and doing a variety of interviews.

In October 2018, Borders left the league to become the first president and chief executive officer of Time's Up. In February 2019, she abruptly left her position at Time's Up due to sexual misconduct accusations against her son.

== Recognition ==
In 2018, Borders was named by People magazine as one of their 25 Women Changing the World.
