= Cathy Woolard =

American politician (born 1957)

President of the Atlanta City Council
- In office January 7, 2002 – August 16, 2004
- Preceded by: Robb Pitts
- Succeeded by: Lisa Borders

Member of the Atlanta City Council District 6
- In office January 5, 1998 – January 7, 2002
- Preceded by: Mary Davis
- Succeeded by: Anne Fauver

Personal details
- Born: May 10, 1957 (age 69)
- Education: University of Georgia (BA)

Cathy Woolard (born May 10, 1957) is an American politician who served as a member of the Atlanta City Council for District 6 from January 1998 to January 2002, and as president of the council from 2002 to 2004. When she began her term in 1997, she was the first openly-gay elected official in Georgia history, and she was the first woman to be President of the council.

== Education ==
In 1979, Woolard graduated Phi Beta Kappa from the University of Georgia, where she majored in psychology and minored in German. In 2003, Woolard completed Harvard University's John F. Kennedy School of Government program for Senior Executives in State and Local Government as a David Bohnett LGBTQ Victory Institute Leadership Fellow.

== Career ==
Following college, Woolard served as a Peace Corps volunteer in Micronesia and then as a National Field Director for the Human Rights Campaign.

=== Atlanta City Council ===
In 1997, Woolard ran and was elected to Atlanta's City Council by the 6th district, upsetting 20-year incumbent Mary Davis. Woolard was sworn in on January 5, 1998. While a council member, Woolard pushed for more pedestrian-friendly zoning, and she won increased funding for sidewalks. She also chaired the city's Transportation Committee, and oversaw an expansion of the Hartsfield-Jackson International Airport, which had just become the busiest airport in the world. In 2000, Woolard led her colleagues on the council to pass a local ordinance banning discrimination based on sexual-orientation, the first such ordinance in Georgia.

In 2001, Woolard won a city-wide election for City Council President. She was sworn in on January 7, 2002. Working closely with Mayor Shirley Franklin and urbanist Ryan Gravel, Woolard championed the Atlanta BeltLine, a project to transform abandoned rail-corridors circling downtown into mixed-use recreational trails and transit. The project has since garnered over $1 billion in private development for the surrounding area. She also made sustainability a priority, creating the city's first-ever energy policy which saved taxpayers more than $470,000, and she founded the "Dirty Dozen," a pilot program to fix the worst code violations in the city.

=== Run for Congress and non-profit activity ===
In 2004, after serving two years of her term as city council president, Woolard entered the race to represent Georgia 4th district in United States House of Representatives, a seat that had been vacated by Denise Majette who had decided to run for the United States Senate seat. Woolard was defeated in the primary by the returning Cynthia McKinney, who then won in the general election.

In 2008, Woolard was appointed as Executive Vice President of Global Advocacy and External Relations at CARE, an Atlanta-based non-profit. She served in that capacity until 2010. She then worked as a professional advocate on behalf of Planned Parenthood and Georgia Equality, with whom she argued against a controversial "Religious Freedom" bill in Georgia that was eventually vetoed by Governor Nathan Deal. Woolard also served as the interim director for AID Atlanta, an organization providing care for those suffering from HIV and AIDS.

After the death of incumbent Congressman John Lewis, Woolard was mentioned as a possible candidate to replace Lewis on the November general election ballot.

=== 2017 mayoral race ===
Woolard was a candidate in the 2017 Atlanta mayoral election, running on a platform of affordable housing and effective transportation. Woolard placed third in the nonpartisan blanket primary. After this, she endorsed Mary Norwood in the runoff.

=== Subsequent activities ===
After the Democratic ticket of Joe Biden and Kamala Harris won the state of Georgia in the 2020 United States presidential election, Woolard served as a Georgia member of the 2020 United States Electoral College, casting her votes for Biden as president and Harris as vice president.

In 2021, over the objections of Georgia Secretary of State Brad Raffensperger, the Fulton County Board of Commissioners appointed Woolard as chair of the Fulton County Board of Elections and Registration, succeeding Alex Wan to the role. Woolard stepped down from the position in 2023, but returned to the role in April 2024 on an interim basis after her successor, Patrise Perkins-Hooker, was appointed as City Attorney for the City of Atlanta.
