= Leroy R. Johnson =

American politician (1928–2019)

Leroy Johnson
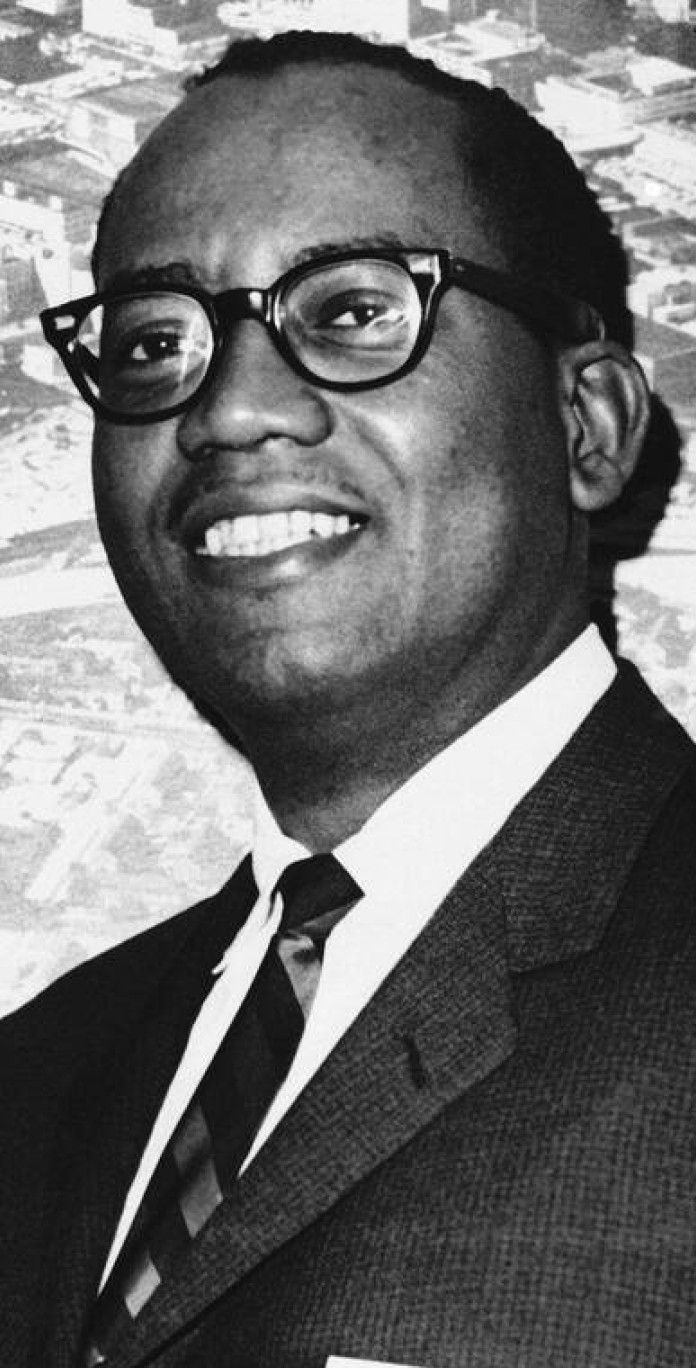
- Johnson in 1962

Member of the Georgia State Senate from the 38th district
- In office January 14, 1963 – January 1975
- Succeeded by: Horace Tate

Personal details
- Born: July 28, 1928 Atlanta, Georgia, U.S.
- Died: October 24, 2019 (aged 91) Atlanta, Georgia, U.S.
- Spouse: Cleopatra Whittington
- Children: 1
- Education: Morehouse College; Clark Atlanta University
- Occupation: Teacher, lawyer

Leroy Reginald Johnson (July 28, 1928 – October 24, 2019) was an American politician who served in the Georgia State Senate from 1963 to 1975 after winning a seat in the 1962 Georgia General Assembly election. He was the first black state senator to be elected to the legislature in more than fifty years, since William H. Rogers in 1907, and the first to be elected to the Senate since 1874.

He served District 38 in Fulton County and Atlanta, a predominantly black senate district created after the elimination of the county-unit system that same year.

Before his term as senator, Johnson was an attorney where he played a role in Atlanta's civil rights movement of the 1960s. The first African American to be hired by the Fulton County Solicitor General's Office (now the Fulton County District Attorney's Office), Johnson served as a Criminal Investigator for the office from 1957 to 1962.

A year into his tenure as state senator, Johnson was appointed by President Lyndon B. Johnson as a Special Ambassador to Zanzibar, joining the U.S. delegation to the country's independence ceremonies in 1963. He represented Muhammad Ali in successfully regaining Ali's boxing license for the 1970 fight against Jerry Quarry in Atlanta, and negotiated with Governor Lester Maddox to secure the fight.

He was later a candidate in the 1973 Atlanta mayoral election but received few votes, despite being familiar to voters and having an endorsement from The Atlanta Constitution. The position went instead to Maynard Jackson who in turn became Atlanta's first African American mayor.

In 2017, the State Bar of Georgia awarded its highest recognition, The Lifetime Achievement Award, to Johnson during a special ceremony held in February. Johnson died on October 24, 2019, at the age of 91.
