= 2021 Atlanta mayoral election =

- November 2, 2021 (first round); November 30, 2021 (Runoff)
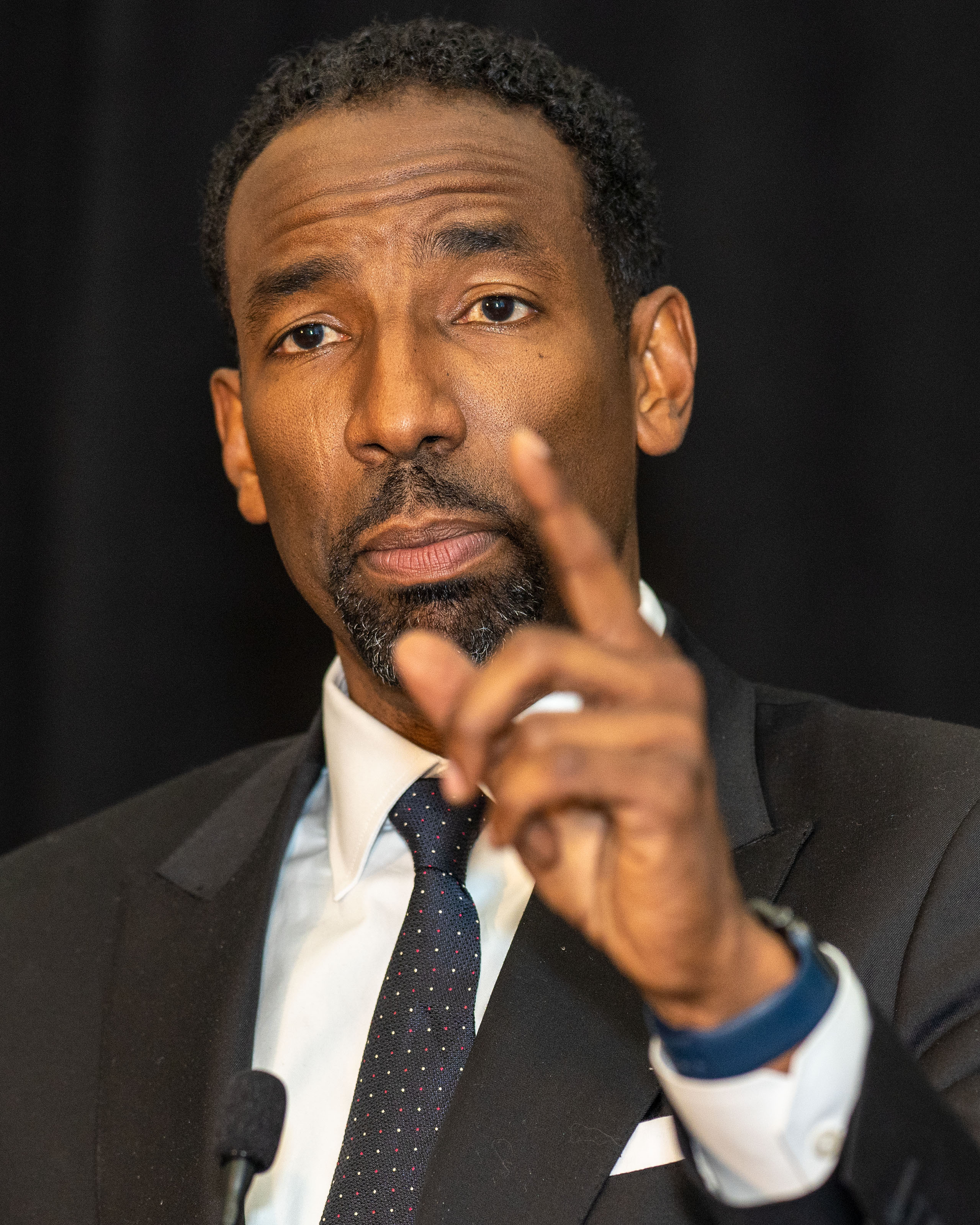

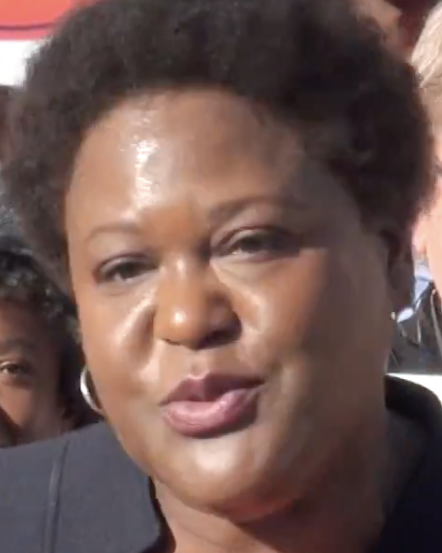

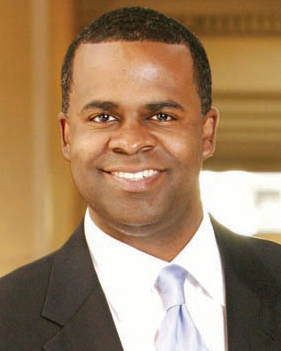

Candidate	Andre Dickens	Felicia Moore
First round	22,153; 23.0%	39,202; 40.8%
Runoff	50,706; 63.4%	29,223; 36.6%
Candidate	Kasim Reed	Sharon Gay
First round	21,541; 22.4%	6,578; 6.8%
Runoff	Eliminated	Eliminated
- Runoff precinct results Dickens: 50–60% 60–70% 70–80% 80–90% >90% Moore: 50–60% 60–70% 70–80% 80–90% No data
Mayor before election
Keisha Lance Bottoms
Democratic
Elected mayor
Andre Dickens
Democratic

The 2021 Atlanta mayoral election occurred on November 2, 2021, with a runoff between the top two candidates taking place on November 30. Incumbent mayor Keisha Lance Bottoms did not seek reelection. City council member Andre Dickens defeated council president Felicia Moore in the runoff by a margin of more than 20%. Candidates eliminated in the general election included former mayor Kasim Reed and attorney Sharon Gay.

== Candidates ==
=== On ballot ===
- Antonio Brown, Atlanta City councilman, District 3 (D); declared May 12, 2021
- Andre Dickens, Atlanta City councilman, at-large Post 3 (D); declared May 13, 2021
- Kirsten Dunn, real estate investor
- Nolan English
- Sharon Gay, attorney; declared April 2021
- Mark Hammad (I)
- Kenneth Hill, nonprofit founder
- Rebecca King, insurance executive
- Felicia Moore, president of the Atlanta City Council (D); declared January 28, 2021
- Kasim Reed, former mayor of Atlanta (2010–2018) (D); declared June 8, 2021
- Walter Reeves, legal scholar
- Roosevelt Searles III, businessman (I); declared June 7, 2021
- Richard Wright, public accountant (D); declared July 20, 2021
- Glenn Wrightson, candidate for mayor in 2017

=== Write-in candidates ===
- Brandon Adkins
- Henry Anderson
- Alex Barrella, cartoonist (G); declared January 1, 2021
- Raina Bell-Saunders, minister (D); declared July 17, 2021
- Devonta "Sully" Sullivan (R)

=== Did not file ===
- Daniel Davenport
- Rachele Fruit (SWP)
- Jonathan Geter
- Amanda McGee
- Robert Wilkes

=== Withdrew ===
- Keisha Lance Bottoms, incumbent mayor of Atlanta (D); declared January 5, 2020, withdrew May 6, 2021

== General election ==
=== Endorsements ===
Keisha Lance Bottoms (withdrew)

U.S. presidents

- Joe Biden, 46th president of the United States; former vice president of the United States (2009–2017); former U.S. senator from Delaware (1973–2009)
Andre Dickens

Individuals

- Shirley Franklin, former mayor of Atlanta
- Sharon Gay, candidate eliminated in the general election
- Keisha Lance Bottoms, incumbent mayor of Atlanta
- State Sens. Tonya Anderson, Gail Davenport, David Lucas, and Niki Merritt
Sharon A. Gay

Individuals

- Cedric Alexander, public safety expert
Felicia Moore

Groups

- Atlanta Professional Firefighters

Individuals

- Dominique Wilkins
Kasim Reed

Labor unions

- AFSCME, Local 1644
- IBPO, Local 623

=== Polling ===
View source data.

Poll source	Date(s) administered	Sample size (Note: Key: A – all adults RV – registered voters LV – likely voters V – unclear)	Margin of error	Antonio Brown	Andre Dickens	Sharon Gay	Rebecca King	Felicia Moore	Kasim Reed	Walter Reeves	Other	Undecided
20/20 Insight (D)	October 17–31, 2021	522 (LV)	± 4.3%	4%	22%	4%	0%	31%	17%	0%	2% (Note: Dunn and Wrightson with 1%; English, Hammad, Hill, Searles, and Wright with 0%)	20%
20/20 Insight (D)	October 17–22, 2021	354 (LV)	± 5.2%	–	21%	–	–	30%	18%	–	–	–
University of Georgia	October 6–20, 2021	779 (LV)	± 3.5%	2%	6%	4%	0%	24%	20%	0%	1% (Note: Hammad with 1%; Dunn, English, Hill, Searles, Wrightson, and Wright with 0%)	41%
SurveyUSA	September 28 – October 5, 2021	544 (LV)	± 5.2%	5%	5%	5%	5%	8%	18%	4%	18% (Note: Hill and Wright with 4%; Hammad and Wrightson with 3%; English with 2%; Dunn and Searles with 1%)	31%
University of Georgia	August 30 – September 13, 2021	842 (LV)	± 3.4%	4%	5%	6%	0%	20%	24%	0%	1% (Note: Dunn, English, Hammad, Hill, Searles, Wrightson, and Wright with 0%)	41%
Secrest Strategies (D) (Note: This poll was sponsored by Gay's campaign)	September 7–12, 2021	600 (LV)	± 4.0%	3%	8%	12%	–	28%	21%	–	–	26%
Public Policy Polling (D) (Note: This poll was sponsored by Safer Atlanta, Inc.)	September 1–2, 2021	633 (LV)	± 3.9%	3%	6%	9%	–	24%	19%	–	–	39%
brilliant corners (D) (Note: This poll was sponsored by Moore's campaign)	August 26–31, 2021	709 (LV)	± 3.8%	–	6%	5%	–	24%	19%	–	–	–
20/20 Insight (D)	Mid-August 2021	~500 (LV)	± 4.4%	3%	15%	4%	–	21%	15%	–	–	40%
SurveyUSA	July 20–25, 2021	516 (LV)	± 5.7%	5%	3%	5%	–	10%	17%	6%	14% (Note: Barrella with 5%; McGee with 4%; Fruit with 3%; Adkins with 2%)	39%
Secrest Strategies (D)	Early July 2021	600 (LV)	± 4.0%	8%	8%	3%	–	32%	24%	–	–	24%
Lester & Associates (D) (Note: This poll was sponsored by Dickens's campaign)	May 26–30, 2021	600 (LV)	± 4.0%	13%	18%	10%	–	11%	13%	–	–	36%

=== Fundraising ===
Campaign finance reports as of July 9, 2021
Candidate (party, if known)	Total raised	Cash on hand
Antonio Brown (D)	$309,676	$280,957
Andre Dickens (D)	$589,823 (Note: Dickens transferred $32,777 from his city council campaign account to his mayoral campaign account. He has stated that he obtained permission from the council campaign donors before doing so. Dickens also loaned his campaign $800.)	$546,000
Sharon Gay	$1,090,000 (Note: Approximately 65% of this total was personally loaned by Gay.)	$991,000
Felicia Moore (D)	$726,813	$604,061
Kasim Reed (D)	$1,050,000 (Note: Reed loaned his campaign $28,000.)	$979,000
Keisha Lance Bottoms (D)	$3,800,000	$258,963

=== Results ===
General election results
Party	Candidate	Votes	%
Nonpartisan	Felicia Moore	39,202	40.8
Nonpartisan	Andre Dickens	22,153	23.0
Nonpartisan	Kasim Reed	21,541	22.4
Nonpartisan	Sharon Gay	6,578	6.8
Nonpartisan	Antonio Brown	4,544	4.7
Nonpartisan	Kenneth Hill	538	0.6
Nonpartisan	Rebecca King	372	0.4
Nonpartisan	Mark Hammad	343	0.4
Nonpartisan	Kirsten Dunn	267	0.3
Nonpartisan	Walter Reeves	162	0.2
Nonpartisan	Glenn Wrightson	150	0.2
Nonpartisan	Richard Wright	138	0.1
Nonpartisan	Nolan English	98	0.1
Nonpartisan	Roosevelt Searles III	72	0.1
Total votes		96,158	100.00

== Mayoral debate ==
The top six candidates participated in a televised debate on Wednesday, October 13, 2021. The debate was broadcast on 11Alive.

== Runoff ==
Sharon Gay, who was eliminated in the general election, endorsed Dickens in the runoff.

=== Debate ===
2021 Atlanta mayoral runoff debate
No.	Date	Host	Moderator	Link	Nonpartisan	Nonpartisan
Key: P Participant A Absent N Not invited I Invited W Withdrawn						
Key: P Participant A Absent N Not invited I Invited W Withdrawn					Andre Dickens	Felicia Moore
1	Nov. 17, 2021	Atlanta Press Club	Donna Lowry	YouTube	P	P

=== Polling ===
Poll source	Date(s) administered	Sample size	Margin of error	Andre Dickens	Felicia Moore	Undecided
SurveyUSA	November 17–22, 2021	561 (LV)	± 5.0%	40%	46%	14%
University of Georgia	November 11–19, 2021	802 (LV)	± 3.5%	43%	37%	20%

Hypothetical polling

Poll source	Date(s) administered	Sample size	Margin of error	Felicia Moore	Kasim Reed	Undecided
Public Policy Polling (D)	September 1–2, 2021	633 (LV)	± 3.9%	47%	22%	30%

=== Results ===
Runoff results (Note: Results are counted by combining results from the official websites of Fulton and DeKalb Counties, the two counties where Atlanta is located.)
Party	Candidate	Votes	%
Nonpartisan	Andre Dickens	50,706	63.4
Nonpartisan	Felicia Moore	29,223	36.6
Total votes		79,929	100.00

==== Results by county ====
County	Andre Dickens		Felicia Moore		Total
County	Votes	Percent	Votes	Percent	Total
Fulton	44,655	62.88%	26,365	37.12%	71,020
DeKalb	6,051	67.92%	2,858	32.08%	8,909

== Notes ==
Partisan clients
