= Atlanta's 11th City Council district =

Atlanta, Georgia administrative district

Atlanta's 11th City Council district is one of the twelve geographic districts in the Atlanta City Council. It is represented by Wayne Martin since 2026, who succeeded Marci Collier Overstreet.

The district was created in 1973 after a new city charter was passed, which replaced the former at-large six-member Board of Aldermen with a 15-member City Council of 12 districts and 6 (later 3) at-large posts.

In 2024, the district contained nearly 43,000 people, comprising 8.5% of Atlanta's population.

== List of councilmembers ==
- Carl Ware (1974–1978)
- Jim Maddox (1978–2010)
- Keisha Lance Bottoms (2010–2018)
- Marci Collier Overstreet (2018–2026)
- Wayne Martin (2026–present)
