= Beth Morrison (disambiguation) =

Beth Morrison may refer to:

- Beth Morrison, American producer of contemporary opera
- Beth Morrison, character in Alex in Wonderland

== See also ==
- Elizabeth Morrison (disambiguation)
