= Jabari Simama =

American educator and public official

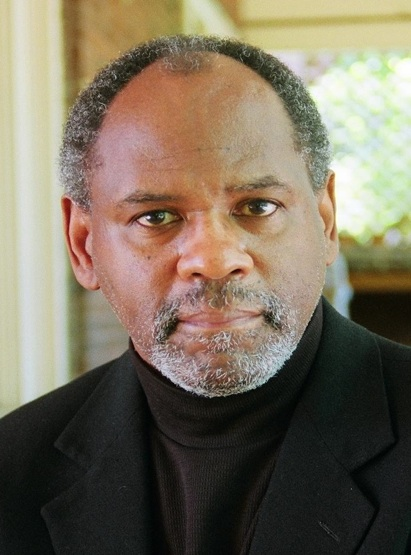
- Born: 1950 or 1951 (age 74–75); Columbia, Missouri
- Education: Lincoln University; University of Bridgeport (BA); Atlanta University (MA); Emory University, 1978 (PhD)
- Occupations: Educator, politician
- Spouse: Nisha Simama

Member of the Atlanta City Council District 3
- In office 1987 – January 3, 1994
- Preceded by: James Howard
- Succeeded by: Michael Julian Bond

Jabari Simama (born March 6, 1950 or 1951) is an American retired educator and public official. Simama served as President of Georgia Piedmont Technical College for six years. He also served as Deputy Chief Operating Officer of Development and Chief of Staff in DeKalb County government from 2009 to 2012. In 2001 he was the chief architect of a large municipal technology program, the Atlanta Community Technology Initiative, to bridge the digital divide where thousands of citizens were taught how to use computers and the internet. Simama also organized broadband in cities' and towns' summits from 2006 to 2009 in Columbia, South Carolina which explored how broadband technology can serve rural and urban communities. Featured in John Barber's book The Black Digital Elite: African American Leaders of the Information Revolution, published by Praeger Publishers, Simama is also the author of Civil Rights to Cyber Rights: Broadband & Digital Equality in the Age of Obama, published in July 2009.

== Education ==
Simama graduated from Hickman High School in Columbia, Missouri. He attended Lincoln University in Jefferson City, Missouri. He received his BA degree from the University of Bridgeport in Bridgeport, Connecticut, his MA degree from Atlanta University in Atlanta, Georgia, and his Ph.D.from Emory University, in Atlanta, Georgia.

== Career ==
Simama began his career as a college professor at Atlanta Junior College (currently, Atlanta Metropolitan College). He then moved to the University of Cincinnati in Ohio where he taught in the African American Studies Department and became the editor of Studia Africana. In 1979 he took an appointment as an associate professor of English at Morgan State University.

He returned to Atlanta in 1980. He became the first general manager of the Public-access television program in Atlanta, sponsored by the cable operator, then Cable Atlanta. Through the program five neighborhood-based studios were opened to teach Atlanta citizens television production skills.

At the end of 1986, Simama left the cable company and ran for elected office for the Atlanta City Council. In 1987, he won and became the first African American elected in the South with an African name. He served two terms as the District 3 council member, before embarking on an unsuccessful campaign for council president.

In 1994 he became a columnist for Creative Loafing (Atlanta), and as co-author of a series of articles entitled "Outside the Fences" in 1996 he won third place for the Alternative Newsweeklies Association (AAN). He published the weekly column until 1998. During this same period he was a visiting professor in the Ivan Allen College of Liberal Arts at the Georgia Institute of Technology. He taught a course on Race and New Media and conducted research, which was featured in John Barber's book, The Information Society and the Black Community.

He returned to the City of Atlanta in 1998 in the position of Director of Communications where he was responsible for all communications and marketing for the city. During his tenure as Director of Communications, he negotiated an 8 million dollar deal with AT&T and Media One to fund a citywide program designed to bridge the digital divide. The City Cyber Program included multiple sites such as recreation centers, libraries, one historical black college, and a cyber bus that brought mobile broadband technology directly to local communities. In 2003, the cyber bus became the operations center for a forum sponsored for U.S. Federal Communications Commission (FCC) Commissioners Michael Copps and Jonathan Adelstein.

In 2005, Simama left government and returned to education as vice president for Community Development and External Affairs and executive assistant to the President at Benedict College in Columbia, South Carolina. There Simama continued his work in community technology, sponsoring four annual summits on Broadband in Cities and Towns. The summits attracted participants from around the country and focused on the idea of expanding broadband to unserved and under-served communities.

In June 2009, Simama returned to Atlanta and began working as the Deputy Chief Operating Officer of Development for DeKalb County and Chief of Staff, the third largest county in Georgia. where he remained until August, 2012. A report of investigation by the DeKalb District Attorney's Office into the county's administration produced indictments against county CEO Burrell Ellis, and accused Simama, as chief of staff under Ellis, of manipulating committees that award contracts. The report recommended a criminal investigation into possible bid-rigging. As of February 2017, Simama faced possible appeals or ongoing litigation as a result of the probe. As of November 2017, no charges were filed against Simama.

Simama served as president of Georgia Piedmont Technical College (GPTC) starting 2012. He was the first black president for the college that had an 78% black student population. In 2018, the college was investigated by the U.S. Department of Education regarding management of its finances, placing the college under "Heightened Cash Monitoring 2" status. As a result of the investigation, GPTC dismissed Simama and placed four other administrators on leave. Simama denied he was removed from his position with the college, and said at the time he was retiring. Simama also defended his tenure as President of GPTC, citing his positive performance evaluations, including regarding fiscal management, and citing having received a merit increase for the year prior to his departure.

In 2019, Simama was one of nine candidates vying in a special general election for Atlanta's District 3 seat on the city council. Simama placed fifth, receiving 9.9% of the votes, compared to the top two candidates Antonio Brown and Byron Amos, who received 19.3% and 23.4% respectively, who went on to the general runoff election for the council seat.

Simama is a consultant, senior fellow with Government Technology, education and government columnist for Governing Magazine, and writes a weekly blog on issues of politics, culture and maleness.

== Works ==
- Civil Rights to Cyber Rights: Broadband & Digital Equality in the Age of Obama, (2009) ISBN 0-615-29662-9
- The Information Society and the Black Community, "Race, Politics, and Pedagogy of New Media: From Civil Rights to Cyber Rights" ed. John Barber, 2001 ISBN 0-275-95724-1
