= 1973 Atlanta mayoral election =

1973 Atlanta Mayoral Election
- October 2, 1973 (general) October 16, 1973 (runoff)

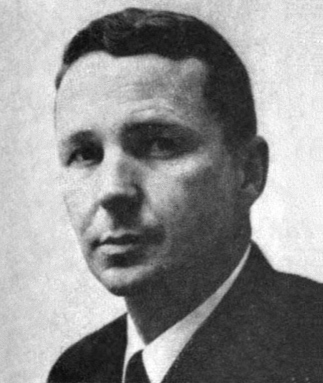
| Nominee | Maynard Jackson | Sam Massell | Charles Weltner |
| Party | Nonpartisan | Nonpartisan | Nonpartisan |
| First round | 47,609; 46.6% | 20,263; 19.9% | 19,553; 19.2% |
| Runoff | 73,603; 59.9% | 49,300; 40.1% | Eliminated |

Jackson
30–40%
40–50%
50–60%
60–70%
70–80%
80–90%
90–100%
Massell
20–30%
30–40%
40–50%
50–60%
60–70%
70–80%
80–90%
90–100%
Weltner
30–40%
40–50%
50–60%
60–70%
Tie/No Data
Mayor before election
Sam Massell
Democratic
Elected mayor
Maynard Jackson
Democratic

The 1973 Atlanta mayoral election was held on October 16, 1973, in Atlanta, Georgia. Vice Mayor Maynard Jackson was elected as the city's first African-American mayor, defeating incumbent Mayor Sam Massell. The election took place concurrently with the 1973 Atlanta City Council election.

In the primary election that preceded the general election, Jackson finished first with 46.4 percent of the vote. Massell finished second with 19.9 percent, followed closely by former United States Representative Charles Weltner with 19.1 percent. Former State of Georgia Department of Industry and Trade Deputy Commissioner Harold A. Dye finished with 8.4 percent and State Senator Leroy Johnson finished with 3.9 percent. Other candidates were former Atlanta Police Officer John Chambers, Socialist Workers Party activist Debby Bustin, Hare Krishna community leader William Ogle, attorney John Genins, Betty Morrison, Ernest Moschella and write-in candidate Howard Tucker. Jackson then defeated incumbent Mayor Sam Massell in a runoff election.

== Background ==
Sam Massell was elected mayor of Atlanta in 1969, defeating Rodney Cook in a runoff election. African-American opponent Horace Tate had placed third in the preliminary election. The first Jewish mayor of Atlanta, Massell had gained the support of Leroy Johnson of the Atlanta Negro Voters League, helping Massell win 90 percent of Atlanta's black vote. Massell was the first Atlanta mayor to receive more votes from black voters than white voters. Shortly after his election, Massell clashed with his vice mayor Maynard Jackson when Jackson tried to handle negotiations during a strike by Atlanta sanitation employees. Jackson was fond of speaking to the local media about racial inequalities within Atlanta's government, but Massell complained that Jackson was "playing to the gallery". In October 1971, Massell gave a speech to Atlanta's black community, exhorting them to "think white" to halt the flight of white Atlantans to the suburbs. With this speech, Massell alienated key members of the black community; his speech was criticized by John Lewis and alderman Henry Dodson. Meanwhile, the Atlanta Urban League resisted Maynard Jackson's attempts to gain support for his campaign until he showed them the results of a Cambridge Survey Research poll that demonstrated he could win 54 percent of the total vote.

== Mayoral campaign ==
- Jackson announced his candidacy on March 28, 1973. He set up his campaign headquarters at Five Points, Atlanta. To raise money for his mayoral run, he hosted fundraisers with Gladys Knight and Roberta Flack. The Atlanta Inquirer and the Atlanta Voice newspapers supported Jackson's mayoral bid.
- Sam Massell was endorsed by the Atlanta Daily World. He ran on the slogan "Win It Again, Sam!".
- Leroy Johnson initially intended to support Jackson's candidacy, but he changed his mind and announced his intentions to run for mayor himself in March 1973. He was endorsed by The Atlanta Constitution.
- Charles L. Weltner announced his candidacy and received the backing of former mayor Ivan Allen Jr. and Robert W. Woodruff, the powerful president of Coca-Cola. Weltner received the support of The Atlanta Journal newspaper.

== General election ==
The general election was held on October 2, 1973. Jackson received the most votes with 46.4 percent. Massell finished second with 19.9 percent, and Charles Weltner earned 19.1 percent. Harold A. Dye finished with 8.4 percent of the vote and Leroy Johnson finished with 3.9 percent. Since Maynard Jackson finished 3,500 votes under the majority required for a win, he faced Massell in a runoff election. Jackson received over 80 percent of the black vote in the general; he received less than 5 percent of the white vote.

1973 Atlanta mayoral general
| Party | Candidate | Votes | % |
|---|---|---|---|
| Nonpartisan | Maynard Jackson | 47,609 | 46.6 |
| Nonpartisan | Sam Massell (inc.) | 20,263 | 19.9 |
| Nonpartisan | Charles Weltner | 19,553 | 19.2 |
| Nonpartisan | Harold A. Dye | 9,165 | 9.0 |
| Nonpartisan | Leroy R. Johnson | 3,900 | 3.8 |
| Nonpartisan | John E. Chambers | 659 | 0.6 |
| Nonpartisan | Debby Austin | 350 | 0.3 |
| Nonpartisan | Betty Morrison | 179 | 0.2 |
| Nonpartisan | R. John Genins | 176 | 0.2 |
| Nonpartisan | William H. Ogle | 152 | 0.1 |
| Nonpartisan | Ernest A. Moschella | 58 | 0.1 |
| Total votes | | 102,064 | 100 |

== Runoff ==
For the runoff election, Massell changed his slogan to "Atlanta's Too Young to Die" and ran a series of print and television ads depicting Atlanta under Maynard Jackson as a barren wasteland. He also appeared on WQXI and labelled Jackson and his political ally Hosea Williams as racists. Massell ran a second ad campaign, naming himself as "Atlanta's Greatest Black Leader" who "Doesn't Happen To Be Black". As a result of Massell's campaigning tactics, the Atlanta Constitution and the Atlanta Journal changed their endorsements to Jackson. Jackson gave speeches urging racial unity and campaigned for the runoff in black churches. In the days leading up to the runoff, Jackson's staffers called local radio stations and warned that black turnout was expected to be low.

The mayoral runoff election was held between incumbent Mayor Sam Massell and Maynard Jackson on October 16, 1973. Early returns demonstrated that Jackson was scoring 20 percent in white districts and 95 percent in some black districts. By 11:00 pm, it became clear that Jackson had won, and he delivered his acceptance speech at the Sheraton Biltmore ballroom. Jackson received 95 percent of the black vote and 21 percent of the white vote.

1973 Atlanta mayoral runoff election
| Party | Candidate | Votes | % |
|---|---|---|---|
| Nonpartisan | Maynard Jackson | 73,603 | 59.88 |
| Nonpartisan | Sam Massell (inc.) | 49,300 | 40.11 |
| Total votes | | 122,903 | 100 |

== See also ==
- List of mayors of Atlanta
