= Panke Bradley Miller =

American politician and social worker (born 1940)

Member of the Atlanta City Council At-large Post 15
- In office July 7, 1972 – July 1979
- Preceded by: Richard A. Petree
- Succeeded by: Elaine Wiggins Lester

Personal details
- Born: Panke J. Mattox; November 25, 1940 (age 85) Parris Island, South Carolina
- Education: Antioch College (psychology); University of Chicago (social work)
- Occupation: Politician, social worker

Panke Bradley Miller (born Panke J. Mattox, 25 November 1940) is an American politician, civic leader, and social worker who was the first woman to serve on the Atlanta Board of Aldermen (today the Atlanta City Council) from 1972 to 1979.

Panke J. Mattox was born in Parris Island, South Carolina, on November 25, 1940, to John D. and Elizabeth K. Mattox; she was raised in Macon, Georgia. She received her bachelor's degree in psychology from Antioch College in Yellow Springs, Ohio, and her graduate degree in community organizing and social work from the University of Chicago. After her studies, Miller returned to Atlanta.

Miller was appointed to the Atlanta Board of Aldermen's at-large Post 15 by mayor Sam Massell on July 7, 1972, becoming the first woman to serve on the council. The post had been filled previously by R. A. "Pete" Petree, who was convicted of bribery and suspended in 1970.

She was later elected in 1973, defeating Henry Dodson and Sherman Barge. Miller was chair of the Human Resources committee, and also served on the Development, Transportation, and Judiciary committees. Miller was described in 1974 by the Atlanta Journal as a "former research analyst for health and community action groups, [and] wife of a Georgia State University sociology professor." In 1975, the New York Times called her "one of the more liberal whites on the City Council". Miller was also a supporter of the Equal Rights Amendment, joining mayor Maynard Jackson to declare January 11, 1975 as "ERA Day in Atlanta". Miller also pledged to introduce gay rights legislation.

After her work in government, Miller was vice-chair of the Georgia section of Common Cause. Miller was honored by the Atlanta City Council in March 2023.

Miller was married to professor Donald M. Bradley in the 1970s. She married Peter O. Miller in the 1980s; he died in 2022.
