= Liliana Bakhtiari =

American politician

Member of the Atlanta City Council District 5
- Incumbent
- Assumed office January 3, 2022
- Preceded by: Natalyn Mosby Archibong

Personal details
- Born: Atlanta, Georgia, U.S.

Liliana Bakhtiari is a community organizer who placed first in the November 2, 2021, non-partisan election to Atlanta City Council in Atlanta, Georgia, United States. She won the November 30 runoff for District 5. She was re-elected in 2025, unopposed.

Bakhtiari was born to Iranian immigrants and raised in Atlanta, Georgia. She is non-binary and queer, and uses she/they personal pronouns.

On November 30, 2021, she became the first out queer Muslim elected official from Georgia and is in a non-monogamous relationship with two partners.
