= Atlanta City Council =

Legislative body of Atlanta, Georgia, US

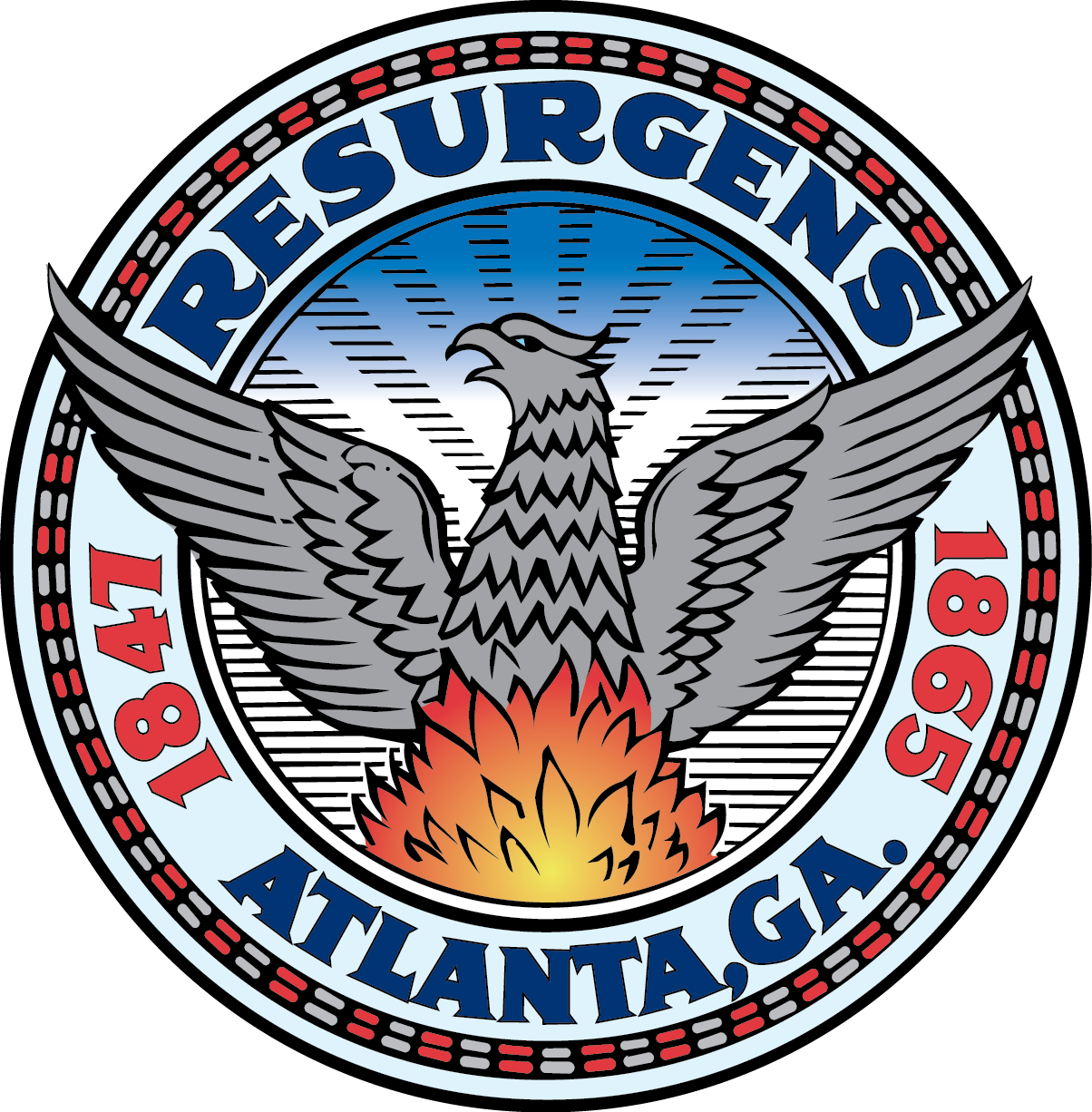

Type
- Type: Unicameral
- Term limits: None

Leadership
- City Council President: Marci Collier Overstreet (January 5, 2026)

Structure
- Seats: 16 Seats: 1 Council president; 12 District seats; 3 At-large posts
- Committees: City Utilities Committee; Committee on Council; Community Development & Human Services Committee; Finance/Executive Committee; Public Safety & Legal Administration Committee; Transportation Committee; Zoning Committee
- Length of term: 4 years
- Salary: $60,300 ($62,000, council president)

Elections
- Last election: November 4, 2025
- Next general election: November 5, 2029

Meeting place
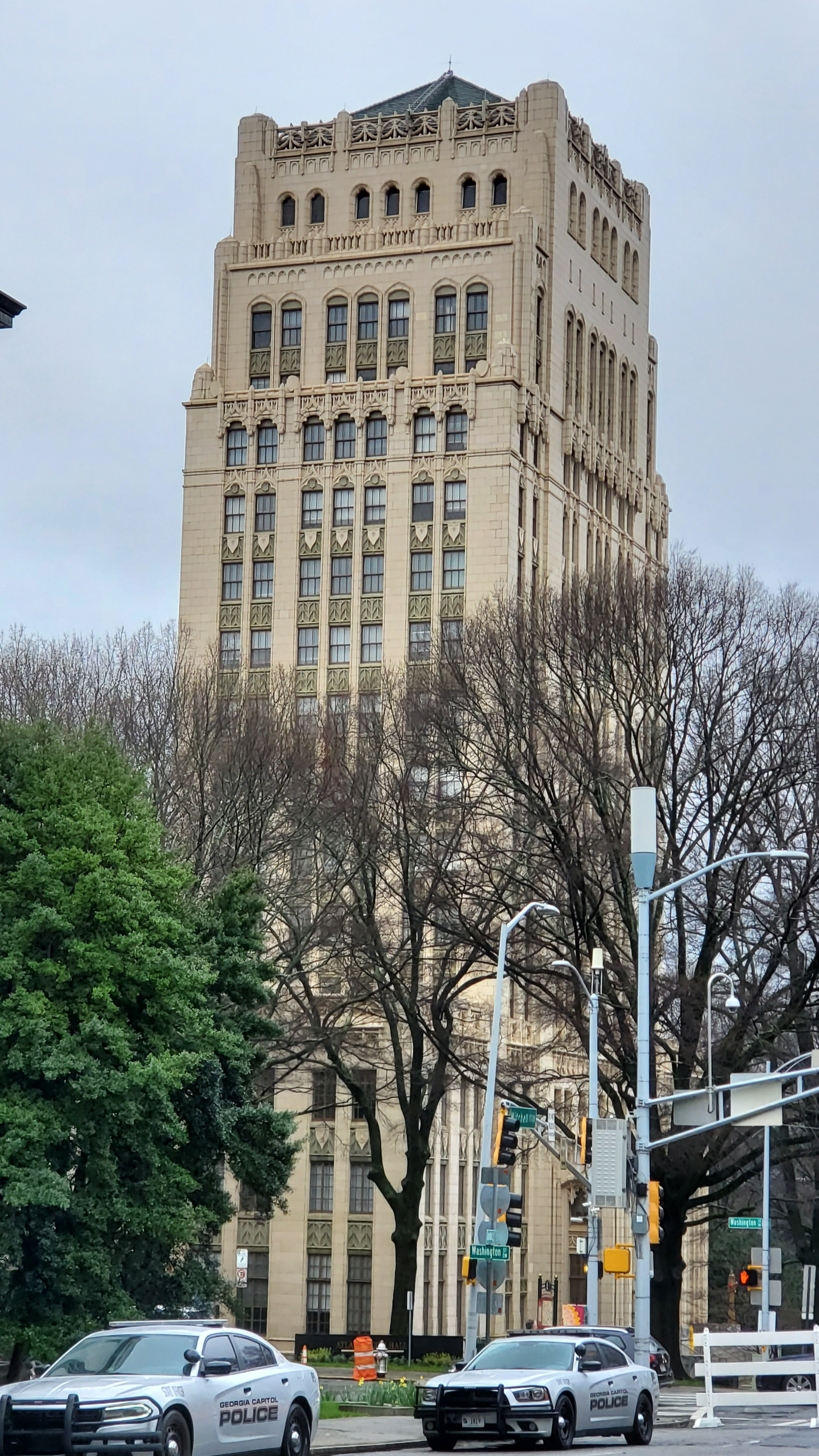
- Atlanta City Hall

Website
- citycouncil.atlantaga.gov

The Atlanta City Council (formerly the Atlanta Board of Aldermen until 1974) is the main municipal legislative body for the city of Atlanta, Georgia, United States. It consists of 16 members: the council president, twelve members elected from districts within the city, and three members representing at-large posts. The city council is the legislative branch of the Atlanta city government.

== History ==
Atlanta's first city charter dates to 1845. The Board of Aldermen consisted of 18 members and each alderman was elected citywide. Since its founding in 1847, Atlanta was divided into wards.

On December 7, 1870, William Finch and George Graham became the first black men to be elected to the Atlanta Board of Aldermen. Graham represented the Third Ward, and Finch represented the Fourth Ward. No other black people were elected to the city council until Q. V. Williamson in 1965.

In 1965, Louise Watley became the first black woman to run for the board of aldermen.

The first woman to serve on the council was Panke Bradley Miller in 1972, and the first black woman was Carolyn Long Banks in 1980.

Alex Wan became the first Asian American member, for District 6, in the November 2009 municipal election.

Beginning in 2014, Atlanta City Council members are paid an annual salary of $60,300 ($62,000 for the council president) for their service.

=== Changes to city charter ===
Grace Towns Hamilton, the first black woman elected to the Georgia House of Representatives, was instrumental in overhauling Atlanta's century-old city charter. In 1965, Atlanta had requested that the Public Service Administration of Chicago review its government; the PSA described the system of wards and aldermen as "unmanageable". After Hamilton tried unsuccessfully to make smaller changes in the late 1960s, she introduced a bill to establish an Atlanta Charter Commission, which passed in 1971. Additionally, the passage of the Voting Rights Act of 1965 meant that the Department of Justice was now filing lawsuits against cities with similar systems.

The Atlanta Charter Commission, consisting of 30 members, began work on July 1, 1971. Its chairman was Atlanta attorney Emmet J. Bondurant, and Hamilton was vice-chairman. Charles F. Wittenstein was executive director, and Hazel A. Jacobs was administrative assistant. A final draft was completed on December 1, 1972, and legislation adopting the new charter was signed by governor Jimmy Carter on March 16, 1973. The new charter took effect on January 7, 1974.

The members of the Atlanta Charter Commission were:

- C. A. Bacote
- Henry Bauer
- Emmet J. Bondurant
- Donald Bradley
- Robert Brisbane
- J. H. Calhoun
- Paul Coverdell
- F. T. Davis Jr.
- Walt Davis
- James E. Dean
- Charles Ford
- Ed Garrard
- Larry Gellerstedt
- Grace Towns Hamilton
- J. R. Henderson
- Donald H. Hollowell
- M. Fred Jones
- Richard A. Kimbel
- Perry O. Lemmons
- Margaret MacDougall
- Sidney Marcus
- G. Everett Millican
- P. Andrew Patterson
- John Savage
- Edgar E. Schukraft
- Carey E. Schulten
- Cecil R. Turner
- Horace Ward
- Joe C. Whitley
- Prentiss Q. Yancey Jr.

The 1974 charter resulted in many changes to Atlanta's government. The Board of Aldermen was changed to the City Council: the position of vice-mayor was replaced by the council president, and 12 council-members would be elected from individual districts, along with six at-large posts. Initially, the plan was to reduce the council to 12 seats of 8 districts and 4 at-large posts, but this was opposed by the Board of Aldermen as well as the Atlanta chapter of the NAACP, which was concerned fewer total members "would reduce the base of representation and thereby reduce the influence of the Negro vote."

The administration of the day-to-day operation of city government was transferred to the executive branch, and legislative authority was vested in the City Council, effectively transitioning Atlanta to a strong-mayor system. The Supreme Court of Georgia ruled in Jackson v. Inman, 232 Ga. 566 (1974), that the new charter was legally valid and its enabling legislation did not violate the state constitution.

Hamilton still believed that at 18 members, the City Council was too large, and worked to change it as long as she was in office.

A new charter was enacted in 1996 that reduced the representation of Council to 12 districts and three at large posts—effective January 1998.

== Structure ==
The president of the City Council is elected from the city at-large (citywide). The Council consists of 15 members, 12 elected from single-member districts and three elected at-large.

- Post 1, representing districts 1–4
- Post 2, representing districts 5–8
- Post 3, representing districts 9–12

The Council president presides at all meetings of the Council and votes in the case of a tie. The president of Council appoints chairs and members of the various committees, subject to rejection by a majority of the Council. The Council president exercises all powers and discharges all duties of the mayor in case of a vacancy in that office or during the disability of the mayor. Councilmembers are elected to four-year terms commencing with the first Monday in January.

The members of the Council elect a president pro tempore each year to serve a one-year term beginning with the first meeting in January. The president pro tempore presides over the Council meetings in the president's absence.

=== Legislative ===
The legislative body, consisting of the Council, makes the laws that govern the city. It is responsible for the development of policies which serve as operational standards and establishes the parameters for the administration of city government.

==== Legislative process ====
Legislation can be introduced on the floor of Council by a Councilmember as a personal paper, or can come through a standing committee. In either case, almost all legislation goes before a committee for discussion at some time. After a paper has been through the committee process, it is voted on by the full Council. The Council may accept or reject the committee's recommendations. A majority vote is needed for adoption. When a paper is adopted by the Council, it goes to the mayor for signature. The paper must be approved or vetoed within seven days. If not signed or vetoed within that period, it automatically becomes law. If vetoed, the Council can override with a two-thirds vote.

=== Executive ===
The Executive body carries out the laws that have been instituted by the City Council. It is responsible for the day-to-day operations of city government.

This system allows the Council to maintain a strong system of checks and balances.

Legislation takes two forms—ordinances and resolutions. An ordinance establishes a permanent rule of government. Every official act of the Council, having the force and effect of law, must be an ordinance. Ordinances must be read before the full Council at two regular meetings. There are exceptions, for example, a Charter amendment requires three readings.

Resolutions usually express intent or support of various projects and enterprises or establish legislative policy of a general nature. Resolutions need be read only once and can be introduced and adopted at the same meeting.

=== Standing committees ===
The standing committees of the Atlanta City Council meet to consider legislation and to make recommendations on each item. The Committees then report their actions to the full Council. Approximately 150 pieces of legislation are handled per meeting. Citizens have the opportunity to appear before a standing committee and to express their views on any piece of legislation.

Comments from the public on matters related to zoning changes are heard by the Zoning Review Board, an independent body composed of appointed city residents. The Zoning Review Board meets once a month.

The Council is required by law to hold a public hearing on certain matters including changes to the City Charter, changes to the City Code of Ordinances, tax increases, etc. Notification must be provided to residents in advance of any public hearing.

==== Current committees ====
There are a total of seven standing committees. As of January 2026, the committees and their chairs are:

- Committee on Council (chair, Byron Amos)
- City Utilities (chair, Dustin Hillis)
- Community Development / Human Services (chair, Matt Westmoreland)
- Finance / Executive (chair, Jason Winston)
- Public Safety and Legal Administration (chair, Andrea Boone)
- Transportation (chair, Alex Wan)
- Zoning (chair, Mary Norwood)

== Membership ==
=== Current members ===
As of January 2026, the Atlanta City Council is composed of:

- Marci Collier Overstreet (President)
- Jason Winston (District 1)
- Kelsea Bond (District 2)
- Byron Amos (District 3)
- Jason Dozier (District 4)
- Liliana Bakhtiari (District 5)
- Alex Wan (District 6)
- Thomas Worthy (District 7)
- Mary Norwood (District 8)
- Dustin R. Hillis (District 9)
- Andrea L. Boone (District 10)
- Wayne Martin (District 11)
- Antonio Lewis (District 12)
- Michael Julian Bond (Post 1)
- Matt Westmoreland (Post 2)
- Eshè Collins (Post 3)

=== Presidents ===
- Wyche Fowler (1974–1976)
- Carl Ware (1976–1979)
- Marvin S. Arrington Sr. (1980–1997)
- Robb Pitts (1997–2001)
- Cathy Woolard (2001–2004)
- Lisa Borders (2004–2010)
- Ceasar Mitchell (2010–2018)
- Felicia Moore (2018–2022)
- Doug Shipman (2022–2026)
- Marci Collier Overstreet (2026–current)

=== Past members ===
==== 1974 Atlanta City Council ====
Elected in late 1973, the 1974 council was the first to convene under the new city charter. The Atlanta Constitution described the group as "nine businessmen, four community activists, two lawyers, [a] coach, [a] housewife and [a] retired plumber". Wyche Fowler was the council president.

1974 Atlanta City Council members
| Seat | Councilmember |
|---|---|
| District 1 | John H. Calhoun |
| District 2 | Charles Helms |
| District 3 | James Howard |
| District 4 | James Bond |
| District 5 | Morris Finley |
| District 6 | Nick Lambros |
| District 7 | George Cotsakis |
| District 8 | Richard Guthman |
| District 9 | Arthur Langford Jr. |
| District 10 | Ira Jackson |
| District 11 | Carl Ware |
| District 12 | Hugh Pierce |
| At-large Post 13 | Gregory Griggs |
| At-large Post 14 | Marvin S. Arrington Sr. |
| At-large Post 15 | Panke Bradley |
| At-large Post 16 | Buddy Fowlkes |
| At-large Post 17 | Q. V. Williamson |
| At-large Post 18 | Jack Summers |

=== Since 1998 ===
A new charter was enacted in 1996 that reduced the representation of the council to 12 districts and three at large posts, effective January 1998.

| Year | President | Dis. 1 | Dis. 2 | Dis. 3 | Dis. 4 | Dis. 5 | Dis. 6 | Dis. 7 | Dis. 8 | Dis. 9 | Dis. 10 | Dis. 11 | Dis. 12 | Post 1 | Post 2 | Post 3 |
|---|---|---|---|---|---|---|---|---|---|---|---|---|---|---|---|---|
| 1998 | Robb Pitts | Vern McCarty | Debi Starnes | Michael Julian Bond | Cleta Winslow | Sherry Dorsey | Cathy Woolard | Lee Morris | Clair Muller | Felicia Moore | C. T. Martin | Jim Maddox | Derrick Boazman | Mable Thomas | Julie Emmons | Douglas C. Alexander |
| 1999 | Robb Pitts | Vern McCarty | Debi Starnes | Michael Julian Bond | Cleta Winslow | Sherry Dorsey | Cathy Woolard | Lee Morris | Clair Muller | Felicia Moore | C. T. Martin | Jim Maddox | Derrick Boazman | Mable Thomas | Julie Emmons | Douglas C. Alexander |
| 2000 | Robb Pitts | Vern McCarty | Debi Starnes | Michael Julian Bond | Cleta Winslow | Sherry Dorsey | Cathy Woolard | Lee Morris | Clair Muller | Felicia Moore | C. T. Martin | Jim Maddox | Derrick Boazman | Mable Thomas | Julie Emmons | Douglas C. Alexander |
| 2001 | Robb Pitts | Vern McCarty | Debi Starnes | Michael Julian Bond | Cleta Winslow | Sherry Dorsey | Cathy Woolard | Lee Morris | Clair Muller | Felicia Moore | C. T. Martin | Jim Maddox | Derrick Boazman | Mable Thomas | Julie Emmons | Douglas C. Alexander |
| 2002 | Cathy Woolard | Carla Smith | Debi Starnes | Ivory Lee Young Jr. | Cleta Winslow | Natalyn Mosby Archibong | Anne Fauver | Howard Shook | Clair Muller | Felicia Moore | C. T. Martin | Jim Maddox | Derrick Boazman | Ceasar Mitchell | Mary Norwood | H. Lamar Willis |
| 2003 | Cathy Woolard | Carla Smith | Debi Starnes | Ivory Lee Young Jr. | Cleta Winslow | Natalyn Mosby Archibong | Anne Fauver | Howard Shook | Clair Muller | Felicia Moore | C. T. Martin | Jim Maddox | Derrick Boazman | Ceasar Mitchell | Mary Norwood | H. Lamar Willis |
| 2004 | Lisa Borders | Carla Smith | Debi Starnes | Ivory Lee Young Jr. | Cleta Winslow | Natalyn Mosby Archibong | Anne Fauver | Howard Shook | Clair Muller | Felicia Moore | C. T. Martin | Jim Maddox | Joyce Sheperd | Ceasar Mitchell | Mary Norwood | H. Lamar Willis |
| 2005 | Lisa Borders | Carla Smith | Debi Starnes | Ivory Lee Young Jr. | Cleta Winslow | Natalyn Mosby Archibong | Anne Fauver | Howard Shook | Clair Muller | Felicia Moore | C. T. Martin | Jim Maddox | Joyce Sheperd | Ceasar Mitchell | Mary Norwood | H. Lamar Willis |
| 2006 | Lisa Borders | Carla Smith | Kwanza Hall | Ivory Lee Young Jr. | Cleta Winslow | Natalyn Mosby Archibong | Anne Fauver | Howard Shook | Clair Muller | Felicia Moore | C. T. Martin | Jim Maddox | Joyce Sheperd | Ceasar Mitchell | Mary Norwood | H. Lamar Willis |
| 2007 | Lisa Borders | Carla Smith | Kwanza Hall | Ivory Lee Young Jr. | Cleta Winslow | Natalyn Mosby Archibong | Anne Fauver | Howard Shook | Clair Muller | Felicia Moore | C. T. Martin | Jim Maddox | Joyce Sheperd | Ceasar Mitchell | Mary Norwood | H. Lamar Willis |
| 2008 | Lisa Borders | Carla Smith | Kwanza Hall | Ivory Lee Young Jr. | Cleta Winslow | Natalyn Mosby Archibong | Anne Fauver | Howard Shook | Clair Muller | Felicia Moore | C. T. Martin | Jim Maddox | Joyce Sheperd | Ceasar Mitchell | Mary Norwood | H. Lamar Willis |
| 2009 | Lisa Borders | Carla Smith | Kwanza Hall | Ivory Lee Young Jr. | Cleta Winslow | Natalyn Mosby Archibong | Anne Fauver | Howard Shook | Clair Muller | Felicia Moore | C. T. Martin | Jim Maddox | Joyce Sheperd | Ceasar Mitchell | Mary Norwood | H. Lamar Willis |
| 2010 | Ceasar Mitchell | Carla Smith | Kwanza Hall | Ivory Lee Young Jr. | Cleta Winslow | Natalyn Mosby Archibong | Alex Wan | Howard Shook | Yolanda Adrean | Felicia Moore | C. T. Martin | Keisha Lance Bottoms | Joyce Sheperd | Michael Julian Bond | Aaron Watson | H. Lamar Willis |
| 2011 | Ceasar Mitchell | Carla Smith | Kwanza Hall | Ivory Lee Young Jr. | Cleta Winslow | Natalyn Mosby Archibong | Alex Wan | Howard Shook | Yolanda Adrean | Felicia Moore | C. T. Martin | Keisha Lance Bottoms | Joyce Sheperd | Michael Julian Bond | Aaron Watson | H. Lamar Willis |
| 2012 | Ceasar Mitchell | Carla Smith | Kwanza Hall | Ivory Lee Young Jr. | Cleta Winslow | Natalyn Mosby Archibong | Alex Wan | Howard Shook | Yolanda Adrean | Felicia Moore | C. T. Martin | Keisha Lance Bottoms | Joyce Sheperd | Michael Julian Bond | Aaron Watson | Andre Dickens |
| 2013 | Ceasar Mitchell | Carla Smith | Kwanza Hall | Ivory Lee Young Jr. | Cleta Winslow | Natalyn Mosby Archibong | Alex Wan | Howard Shook | Yolanda Adrean | Felicia Moore | C. T. Martin | Keisha Lance Bottoms | Joyce Sheperd | Michael Julian Bond | Aaron Watson | Andre Dickens |
| 2014 | Ceasar Mitchell | Carla Smith | Kwanza Hall | Ivory Lee Young Jr. | Cleta Winslow | Natalyn Mosby Archibong | Alex Wan | Howard Shook | Yolanda Adrean | Felicia Moore | C. T. Martin | Keisha Lance Bottoms | Joyce Sheperd | Michael Julian Bond | Mary Norwood | Andre Dickens |
| 2015 | Ceasar Mitchell | Carla Smith | Kwanza Hall | Ivory Lee Young Jr. | Cleta Winslow | Natalyn Mosby Archibong | Alex Wan | Howard Shook | Yolanda Adrean | Felicia Moore | C. T. Martin | Keisha Lance Bottoms | Joyce Sheperd | Michael Julian Bond | Mary Norwood | Andre Dickens |
| 2016 | Ceasar Mitchell | Carla Smith | Kwanza Hall | Ivory Lee Young Jr. | Cleta Winslow | Natalyn Mosby Archibong | Alex Wan | Howard Shook | Yolanda Adrean | Felicia Moore | C. T. Martin | Keisha Lance Bottoms | Joyce Sheperd | Michael Julian Bond | Mary Norwood | Andre Dickens |
| 2017 | Ceasar Mitchell | Carla Smith | Kwanza Hall | Ivory Lee Young Jr. | Cleta Winslow | Natalyn Mosby Archibong | Alex Wan | Howard Shook | Yolanda Adrean | Felicia Moore | C. T. Martin | Keisha Lance Bottoms | Joyce Sheperd | Michael Julian Bond | Mary Norwood | Andre Dickens |
| 2018 | Felicia Moore | Carla Smith | Amir Farokhi | Ivory Lee Young Jr. | Cleta Winslow | Natalyn Mosby Archibong | Jennifer N. Ide | Howard Shook | J. P. Matzigkeit | Dustin R. Hillis | Andrea L. Boone | Marci Collier Overstreet | Joyce Sheperd | Michael Julian Bond | Matt Westmoreland | Andre Dickens |
| 2019 | Felicia Moore | Carla Smith | Amir Farokhi | Antonio Brown | Cleta Winslow | Natalyn Mosby Archibong | Jennifer N. Ide | Howard Shook | J. P. Matzigkeit | Dustin R. Hillis | Andrea L. Boone | Marci Collier Overstreet | Joyce Sheperd | Michael Julian Bond | Matt Westmoreland | Andre Dickens |
| 2020 | Felicia Moore | Carla Smith | Amir Farokhi | Antonio Brown | Cleta Winslow | Natalyn Mosby Archibong | Jennifer N. Ide | Howard Shook | J. P. Matzigkeit | Dustin R. Hillis | Andrea L. Boone | Marci Collier Overstreet | Joyce Sheperd | Michael Julian Bond | Matt Westmoreland | Andre Dickens |
| 2021 | Felicia Moore | Carla Smith | Amir Farokhi | Antonio Brown | Cleta Winslow | Natalyn Mosby Archibong | Jennifer N. Ide | Howard Shook | J. P. Matzigkeit | Dustin R. Hillis | Andrea L. Boone | Marci Collier Overstreet | Joyce Sheperd | Michael Julian Bond | Matt Westmoreland | Andre Dickens |
| 2022 | Doug Shipman | Jason Winston | Amir Farokhi | Byron Amos | Jason Dozier | Liliana Bakhtiari | Alex Wan | Howard Shook | Mary Norwood | Dustin R. Hillis | Andrea L. Boone | Marci Collier Overstreet | Antonio Lewis | Michael Julian Bond | Matt Westmoreland | Keisha Waites |
| 2023 | Doug Shipman | Jason Winston | Amir Farokhi | Byron Amos | Jason Dozier | Liliana Bakhtiari | Alex Wan | Howard Shook | Mary Norwood | Dustin R. Hillis | Andrea L. Boone | Marci Collier Overstreet | Antonio Lewis | Michael Julian Bond | Matt Westmoreland | Keisha Waites |
| 2024 | Doug Shipman | Jason Winston | Amir Farokhi | Byron Amos | Jason Dozier | Liliana Bakhtiari | Alex Wan | Howard Shook | Mary Norwood | Dustin R. Hillis | Andrea L. Boone | Marci Collier Overstreet | Antonio Lewis | Michael Julian Bond | Matt Westmoreland | Keisha Waites |
| 2025 | Doug Shipman | Jason Winston | Carden Wyckoff | Byron Amos | Jason Dozier | Liliana Bakhtiari | Alex Wan | Howard Shook | Mary Norwood | Dustin R. Hillis | Andrea L. Boone | Marci Collier Overstreet | Antonio Lewis | Michael Julian Bond | Matt Westmoreland | Eshé Collins |
| 2026 | Marci Collier Overstreet | Jason Winston | Kelsea Bond | Byron Amos | Jason Dozier | Liliana Bakhtiari | Alex Wan | Thomas Worthy | Mary Norwood | Dustin R. Hillis | Andrea L. Boone | Wayne Martin | Antonio Lewis | Michael Julian Bond | Matt Westmoreland | Eshé Collins |

=== Other past members ===
- Green B. Adair, alderman
- Carolyn Long Banks, first black woman on Council (1980)
- Keisha Lance Bottoms (District 11, 2010-2018), later mayor
- Panke Bradley Miller, first woman on the Board of Aldermen
- Archie Byron
- Charles A. Collier, alderman, later mayor
- Rodney Mims Cook Sr., alderman, later state representative
- Andre Dickens, at-large district Post 3
- William Finch, one of first two black men elected to the Board of Aldermen, Fourth Ward (1870)
- George Graham, one of first two black men elected to the Board of Aldermen, Third Ward (1870)
- Kwanza Hall (2nd district, 2005–2017), later U.S. representative for GA-5 (2020-2021)
- Thomas G. Healey, alderman at-large (1881) and mayor pro tem (1884)
- James L. Key, alderman, later mayor
- Sam Massell, President of Atlanta's Board of Aldermen, later mayor
- Deborah McCarty, District 1
- Levi B. Nelson, alderman
- Edward C. Peters, alderman
- Augustus M. Reinhardt, alderman, mayor pro tem
- Frank P. Rice, alderman
- Zachariah A. Rice, alderman
- Doug Shipman, president, 2022–2026
- Howard Shook, District 7
- Jabari Simama, District 3 (1988-1996)
- Keisha Waites, at-large district Post 3
- Hosea Williams (1986-1990)
- Q. V. Williamson, first black man elected to Board of Aldermen since Reconstruction, 1965
- Henry Lumpkin Wilson, alderman
- Carden Wyckoff (District 2)
