= Doug Shipman =

American politician

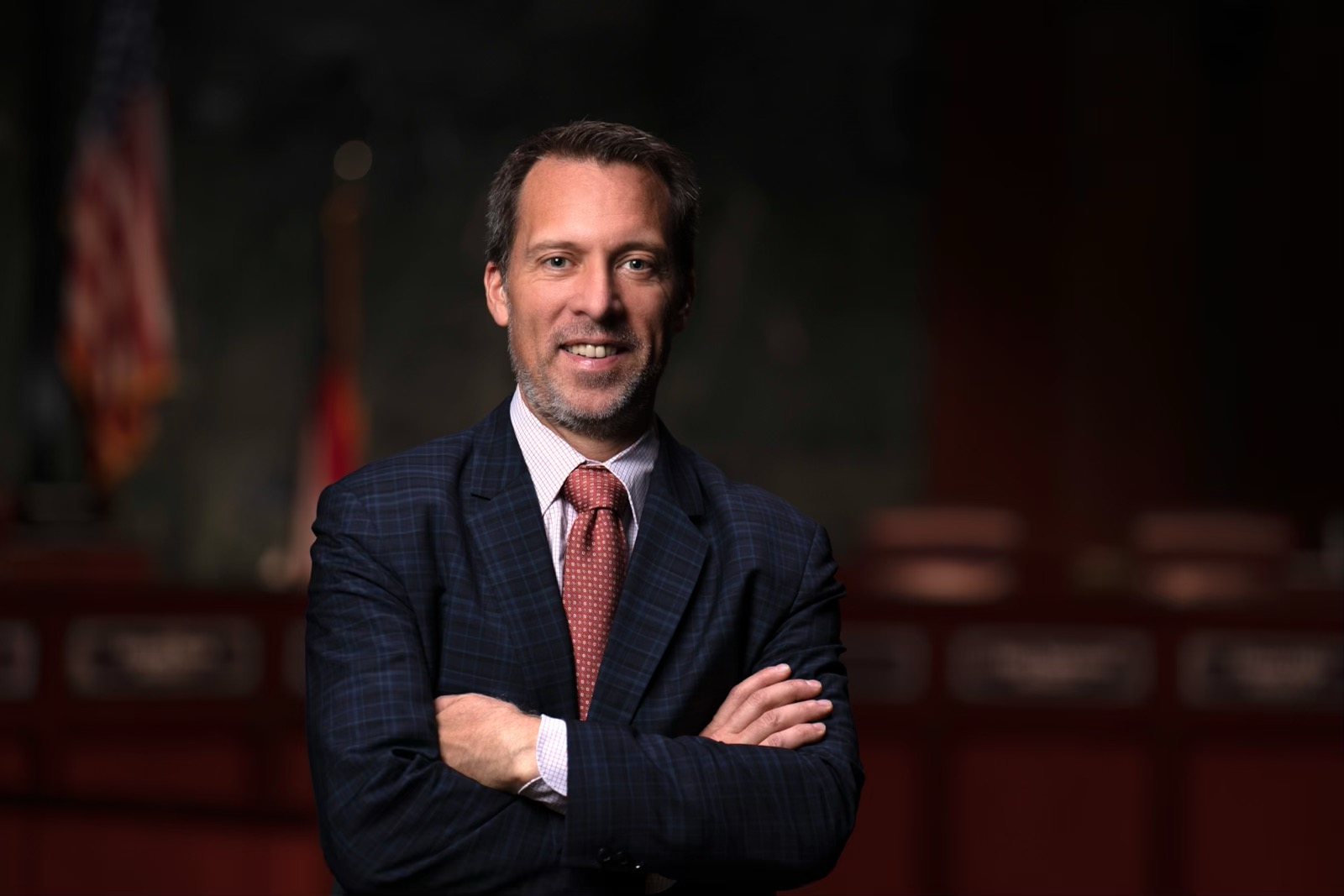
- Shipman in 2022

President of the Atlanta City Council
- In office January 3, 2022 – January 5, 2026
- Preceded by: Felicia Moore
- Succeeded by: Marci Collier Overstreet

Personal details
- Party: Democratic
- Education: Emory University (BA); Harvard Divinity School (MTh); Harvard Kennedy School (MPP)

Doug Shipman is an American politician and civic leader who served as president of the Atlanta City Council from January 2022 to January 2026 after being elected in December 2021. Shipman previously held leadership positions in cultural and nonprofit organizations in Atlanta.

== Early life and education ==
Shipman grew up in the rural area of Bull Shoals, Arkansas. He moved to Atlanta to attend Emory University, where he graduated magna cum laude in 1995 with a bachelor’s degree in political science and economics. He later earned a Master of Theological Studies degree from the Harvard Divinity School and a Master of Public Policy degree from the Harvard Kennedy School.

== Career ==
From 2007 to 2015, Shipman was the founding CEO of the National Center for Civil and Human Rights. In this role, he oversaw the design, construction, and launch of the center.

Shipman served as CEO of BCG BrightHouse Consulting from 2015 to 2017. He was the president and CEO of the Woodruff Arts Center from 2017 to 2020.

=== Council ===
In December 2021, Shipman was elected president of the Atlanta City Council, taking office in January 2022. In August 2024 Shipman and other elected officials urged MARTA and the city of Atlanta to move forward with rail on the Atlanta Beltline. Shipman announced in February 2025 that he would not seek a second term in the November 2025 election due to family medical issues.

Shipman currently serves on the board of trustees for The Carter Center and as a board member for the Atlanta International School. He previously held board positions with the Metro Atlanta Chamber of Commerce, Midtown Alliance, and the Atlanta Convention and Visitors Bureau.

== Personal life ==
Shipman is married to Bijal Shah, an associate professor in the Department of Emergency Medicine at Emory University School of Medicine and an ER physician at Grady Memorial Hospital. They have two daughters. He is an avid runner and is on the Atlanta Track Club board of directors.
