= Frank P. Rice =

American politician

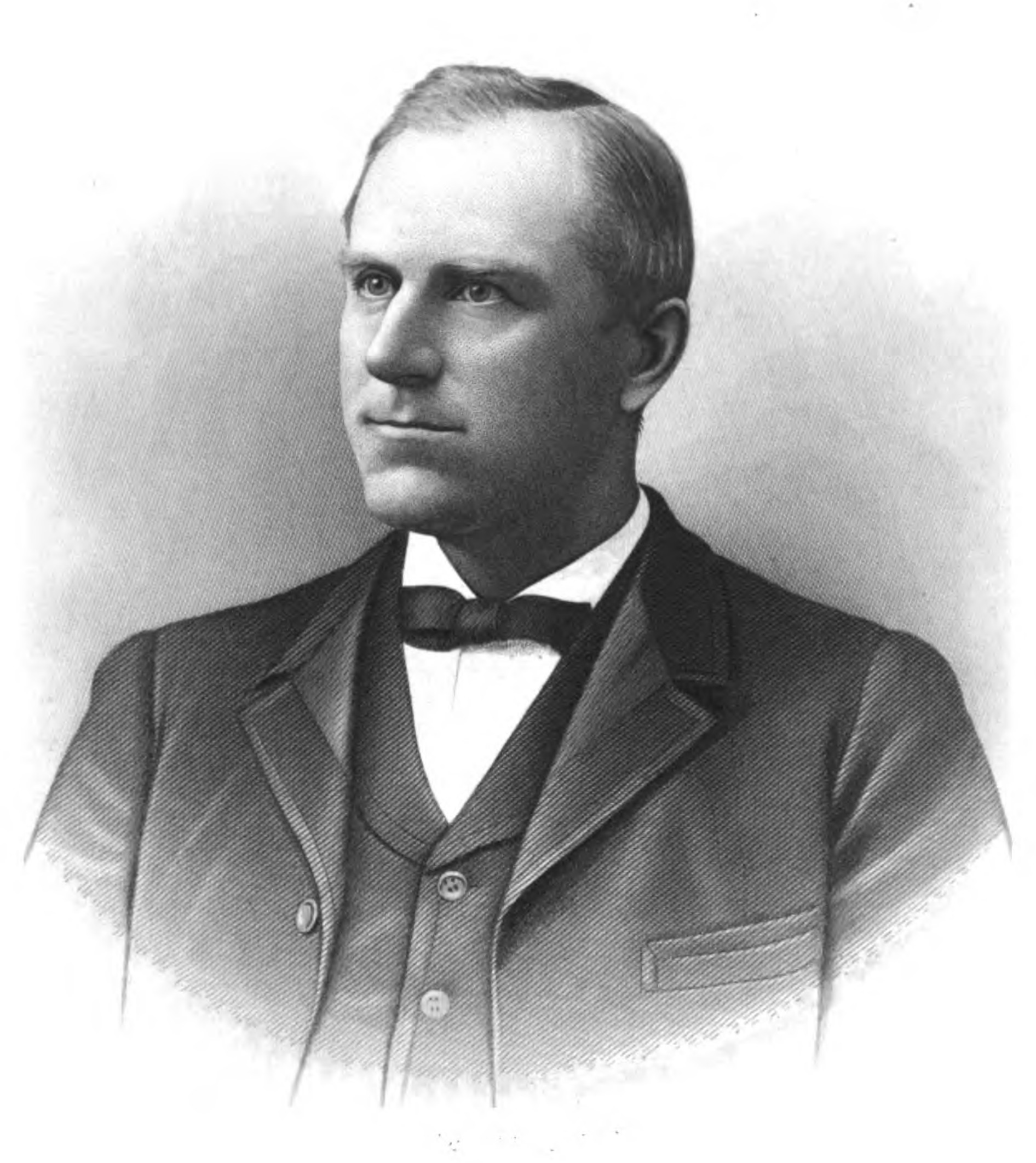
- Born: October 28, 1838
- Died: March 10, 1923 (aged 84)

Franklin P. Rice (October 28, 1838, Sullivan County, New Hampshire - March 10, 1923, Atlanta) was an investor, businessman and local politician in Atlanta, Georgia.

== Career ==
He was elected to Atlanta City Council in 1870 and served until 1874, and again 1886–1888. Rice was instrumental in the establishment of the Atlanta public school system. He served for nine years on the Board of Health, and served on the citizen's committee in favor of moving the state capital to Atlanta.

From 1880 to 1884 he served as a representative in the Georgia General Assembly. In 1888 he was elected to the Georgia State Senate.

He was instrumental in obtaining land for the right-of-way for extension of the Richmond and Danville Railroad and Georgia Pacific Railway.

in 1897 he fought (and failed) to expand the Atlanta city limits to include what is now Midtown Atlanta, the Georgia Tech campus, English Avenue, Reynoldstown, and Pittsburgh. These areas would only become part of the city in 1904.

Rice ran for mayor in 1901 and lost.

He was elected a commissioner on the Board of Water in 1902.

Rice owned "a large amount of central and well-improved real estate" in Atlanta.

Rice died in 1923.
