= Marci Collier Overstreet =

American politician

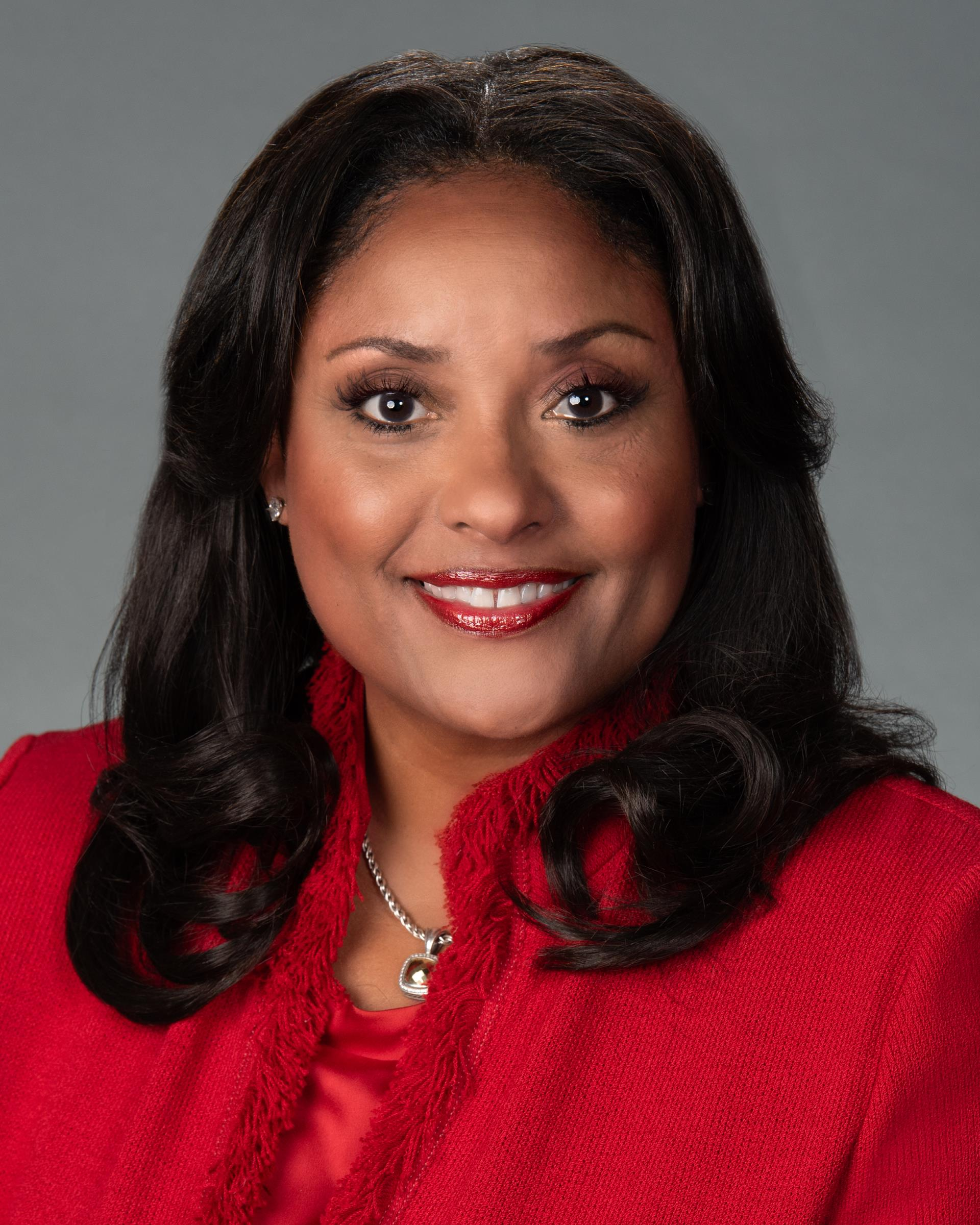
- Official portrait, 2026

President of the Atlanta City Council
- Incumbent
- Assumed office January 5, 2026
- Preceded by: Doug Shipman

Member of the Atlanta City Council from District 11
- In office January 2, 2018 – January 5, 2026
- Preceded by: Keisha Lance Bottoms
- Succeeded by: Wayne Martin

Personal details
- Party: Democratic
- Education: Georgia State University (BA)
- Website: Office website Campaign website

Marci Collier Overstreet is an American politician serving as the president of the Atlanta City Council. She previously represented District 11 on the council from 2018 to 2026.

== Early life and education ==
Overstreet was raised in Southwest Atlanta and graduated from Benjamin E. Mays High School in 1983. She attended Georgia State University, earning a Bachelor of Arts degree in journalism with a minor in management. Prior to her political career, she worked as a business professional, author, and entrepreneur.

== Atlanta City Council ==
Overstreet entered municipal politics in 2017, running for the District 11 council seat vacated by Keisha Lance Bottoms. She advanced to a runoff election on December 5, 2017, defeating Harold Hardnett with 52.6% of the vote. She assumed office on January 2, 2018. During her tenure representing Southwest Atlanta, her platform emphasized neighborhood safety, managing economic growth, and preserving park greenspace.

In August 2025, Overstreet announced her candidacy for President of the Atlanta City Council to succeed Doug Shipman. She won the citywide election on November 4, 2025, and took office as Council President on January 5, 2026. Upon taking office, she structured the council's legislative committees, appointing committee chairs for the 2026 term.

In May 2026, Overstreet was among three council members who attended a heavily attended public engagement hearing regarding the city's upcoming budget, navigating public pushback concerning proposed reductions to the city's parks and recreation funding relative to police funding enhancements. She presided over the council session on June 15, 2026, which approved a $994.6 million General Fund operating budget for fiscal year 2027.

== Awards and recognition ==
In May 2026, Overstreet was awarded the 2026 Humanitarian of the Year Award by the Atlanta Fire Rescue Department and the Atlanta Fire Rescue Foundation, recognizing her civic engagement and community leadership.
