= Felicia Moore =

American politician

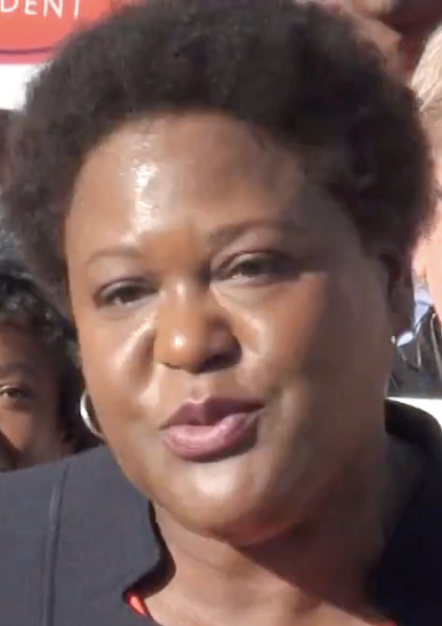
- Moore in 2017

President of the Atlanta City Council
- In office January 2, 2018 – January 3, 2022
- Preceded by: Ceasar Mitchell
- Succeeded by: Doug Shipman

Member of the Atlanta City Council District 9
- In office January 5, 1998 – January 2, 2018
- Preceded by: Jared Samples
- Succeeded by: Dustin Hillis

Personal details
- Party: Democratic
- Education: Central State University (BA); Central Michigan University (MS)

Felicia A. Moore is an American politician who served as the president of the Atlanta City Council. She was elected to the office in a December 2017 runoff election. She previously held the post of City Council member for District 9, serving for 20 years.

She graduated from Central State University in with a Bachelor of Arts in communication, where she became a member of the Alpha Kappa Alpha sorority. She holds a Master of Science in Administration degree from Central Michigan University with a concentration in Public Administration.

== 2021 Atlanta mayoral race ==
On January 28, 2021, Moore announced her candidacy for Mayor of Atlanta in the 2021 Atlanta mayoral election. Her platform focuses on safer neighborhoods, government transparency, fiscal stability, and guaranteed city services.

Moore placed first in the first round of the election, held on November 2, but lost the November 30 runoff to Andre Dickens, winning 37% against Dickens' 63% of the vote. After her loss, she blamed the rappers T.I. and Ike Dirty for turning public opinion against her, after they posted on social media that she had pledged to close all strip clubs in the city if elected. According to TMZ, Moore said that the claims originated from a quote taken out of context, when she expressed her opposition to issuing new permits to certain businesses, such as recording studios, and accused the rappers of spreading misinformation.
