= Ceasar Mitchell =

American politician (born 1968)

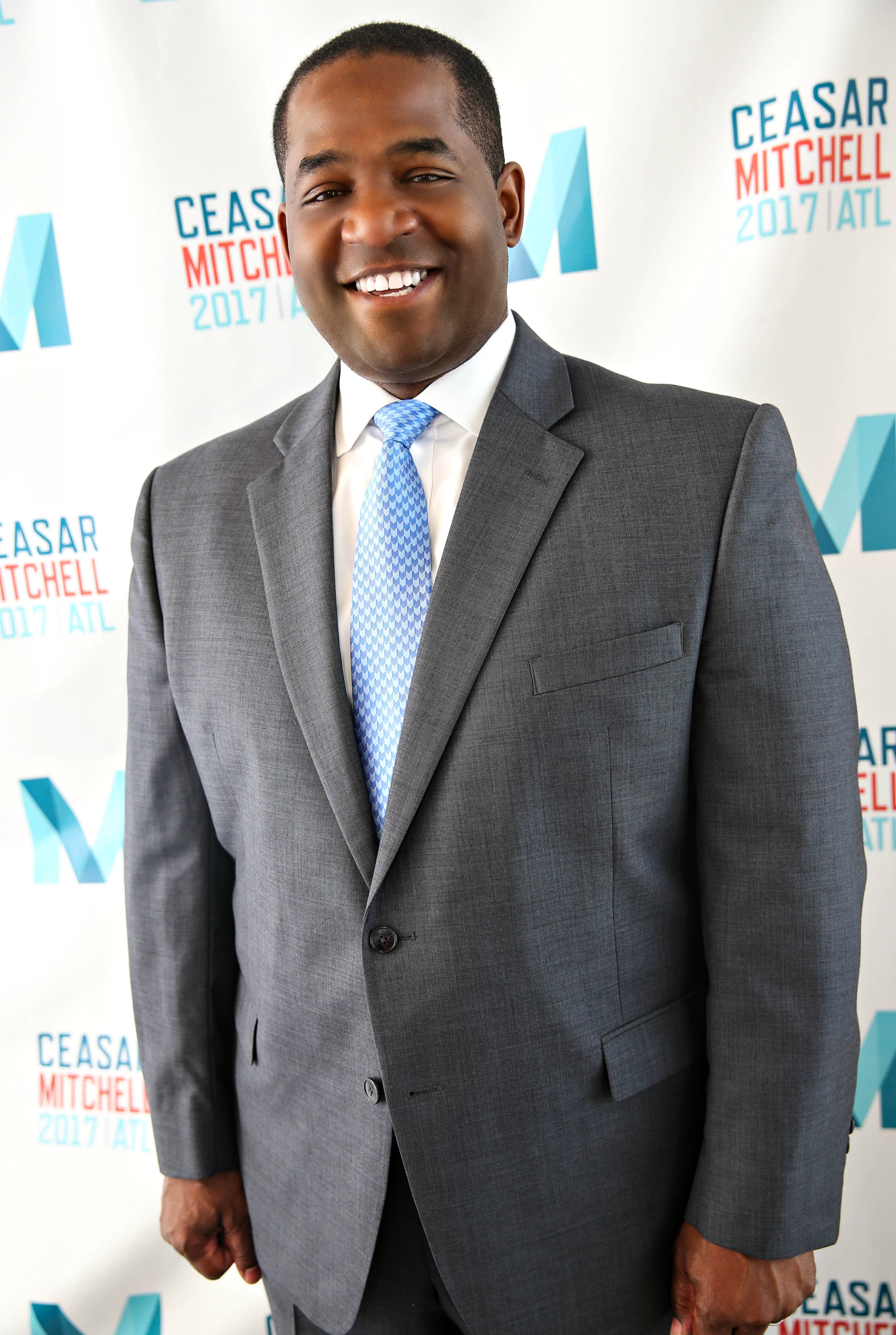
- Mitchell in 2016

President of the Atlanta City Council
- In office January 4, 2010 – January 2, 2018
- Preceded by: Lisa Borders
- Succeeded by: Felicia Moore

Member of the Atlanta City Council from At-Large Post 1
- In office January 7, 2002 – January 4, 2010
- Preceded by: Mable Thomas
- Succeeded by: Michael Julian Bond

Personal details
- Born: October 25, 1968 (age 57) Atlanta, Georgia, U.S.
- Spouse: Tiffany Mitchell
- Children: 3
- Education: Morehouse College (BA); University of Georgia (JD)

Ceasar C. Mitchell (born October 25, 1968) is an American politician and attorney who served as President of Atlanta City Council from 2010 to 2018. He was an unsuccessful candidate in the 2017 Atlanta mayoral election.

== Early life and education ==
Mitchell is a native of Atlanta, Georgia. His father was an Atlanta Police Department officer and his mother taught in the Atlanta Public Schools. Mitchell graduated from Benjamin Elijah Mays High School. He earned a Bachelor of Arts degree from Morehouse College, where he double-majored in English and economics. He then earned a Juris Doctor from the University of Georgia School of Law.

== Career ==
Prior to his election as president of the Atlanta City Council, Mitchell was a council member for eight years. Mitchell is a partner at the international law firm Dentons, where he specializes in public policy and local government.

After the death of incumbent Congressman John Lewis, Mitchell was mentioned as a possible candidate to replace Lewis on the November 2020 general election ballot.

== Personal life ==
Mitchell and his wife, Tiffany, have two daughters and a son. Mitchell's wife is a public school teacher. They live in West End, Atlanta.
