= Alex Wan =

American politician

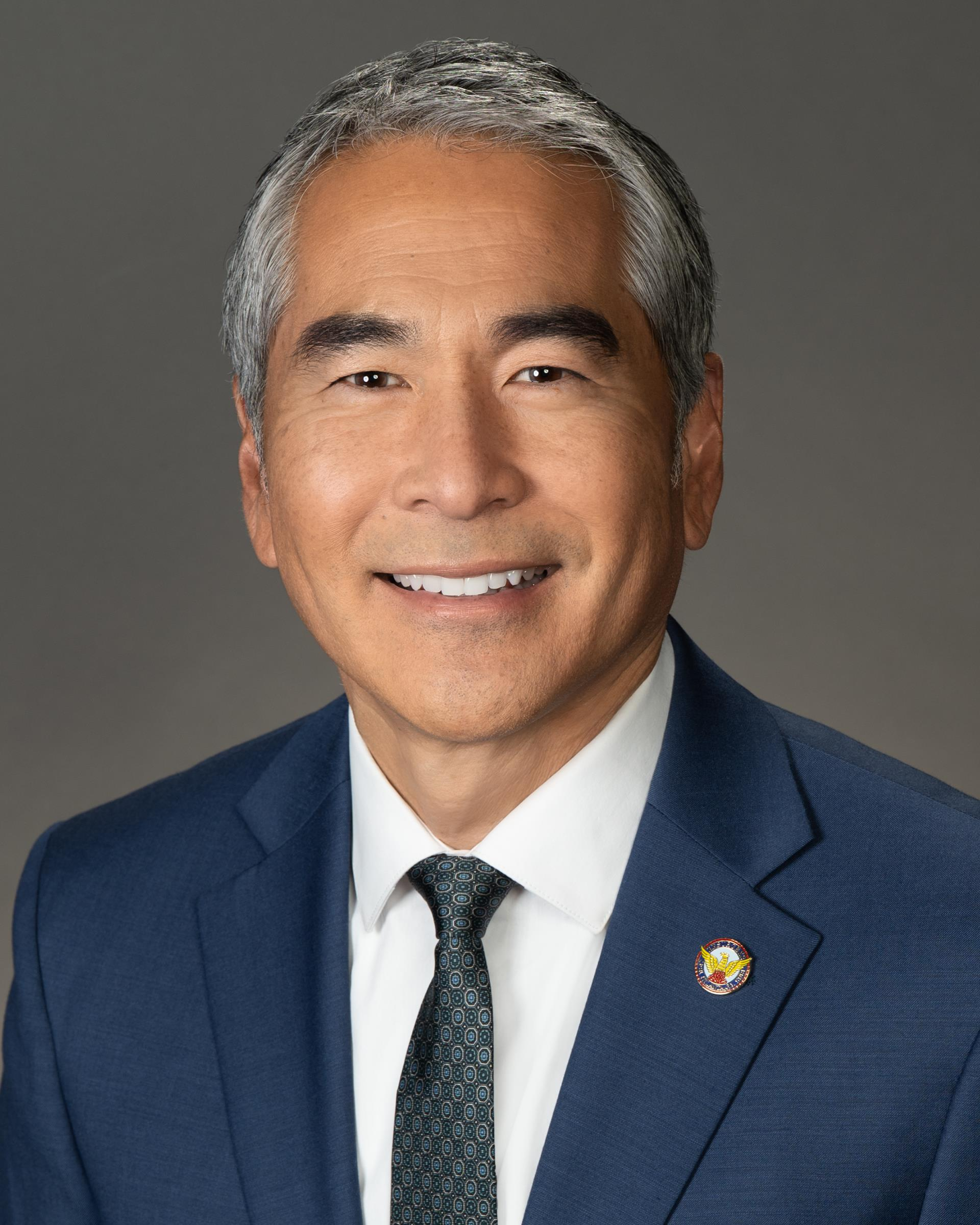

Member of the Atlanta City Council from the 6th district
- Incumbent
- Assumed office January 3, 2022
- Preceded by: Jennifer N. Ide
- In office January 4, 2010 – January 4, 2018
- Preceded by: Anne Fauver
- Succeeded by: Jennifer N. Ide

Personal details
- Born: August 13, 1967 (age 59) Columbia, South Carolina, U.S.
- Education: Wharton School of the University of Pennsylvania (M.B.A.); Georgia Tech (B.E.)
- Occupation: Politician
- Website: www.alexwanforatlanta.com

Alex Su-chi Wan (Chinese: 萬斯祺; pinyin: Wàn Sīqí) is an American politician. He was the first Asian American member of the Atlanta City Council, elected to the position for District 6 in the November 2009 municipal election. He speaks both English and Mandarin Chinese. Since March 3, 2021, Wan previously served as Chairman of the Fulton County Board of Registrations and Elections.

== Early life and education ==
Wan graduated with a Bachelor of Engineering degree in Industrial Engineering in 1988 from The Georgia Institute of Technology, and subsequently went on to Wharton School of the University of Pennsylvania to obtain a Master of Business Administration degree in Finance, graduating in 1993. In 2011, Wan completed Harvard University's John F. Kennedy School of Government program for Senior Executives in State and Local Government as a David Bohnett LGBTQ Victory Institute Leadership Fellow.

== Atlanta City Council ==
In 2009, Wan ran for the open city council seat in District 6 against several candidates including Bahareh Azizi, Steve Brodie, Tad Christian, Liz Coyle, and Miguel Gallegos. Wan and second-place finisher Liz Coyle entered a run off. Wan was endorsed by fourth-place finisher Steve Brodie, a gay man who campaigned for the seat in 2005 against then-incumbent and also openly gay Anne Fauver, as well as the Victory Fund, Georgia Equality, Buckhead Coalition and gay educator Charles Stadtlander. Of the six initial contestants in the race for the council seat, Wan was the only recipient of an "Excellent" grade by Committee for a Better Atlanta.

In 2013, the councilman championed legislation supported by neighborhood associations and NPU F to remove existing adult businesses from Cheshire Bridge Road by 2018, but the Atlanta City Council voted it down. It was also opposed by a mix of gays, strippers and Atlanta's real estate interests – including Scott Selig. Some in the gay community wondered if Cheshire Bridge were "sanitized", "where would people go for sexual expression"? Matthew Cardinale, the editor and publisher of Atlanta Progressive News, and resident of the Road, decried "the ongoing project of gentrification, homogenization, sterilization and capitalization of a historic neighborhood," Atlanta's "red-light district".

In January 2017, Wan announced his candidacy for Atlanta City Council President. Wan lost in a runoff election in December 2017 to Felicia Moore.

In August 2021, then District 6 council member Jennifer Ide announced she would not seek a second term. Wan announced his intent to run and bested a field of four candidates in the general election in November 2021. Wan is now serving his third nonconsecutive term on the Atlanta City Council.
