= Michael Julian Bond =

American politician

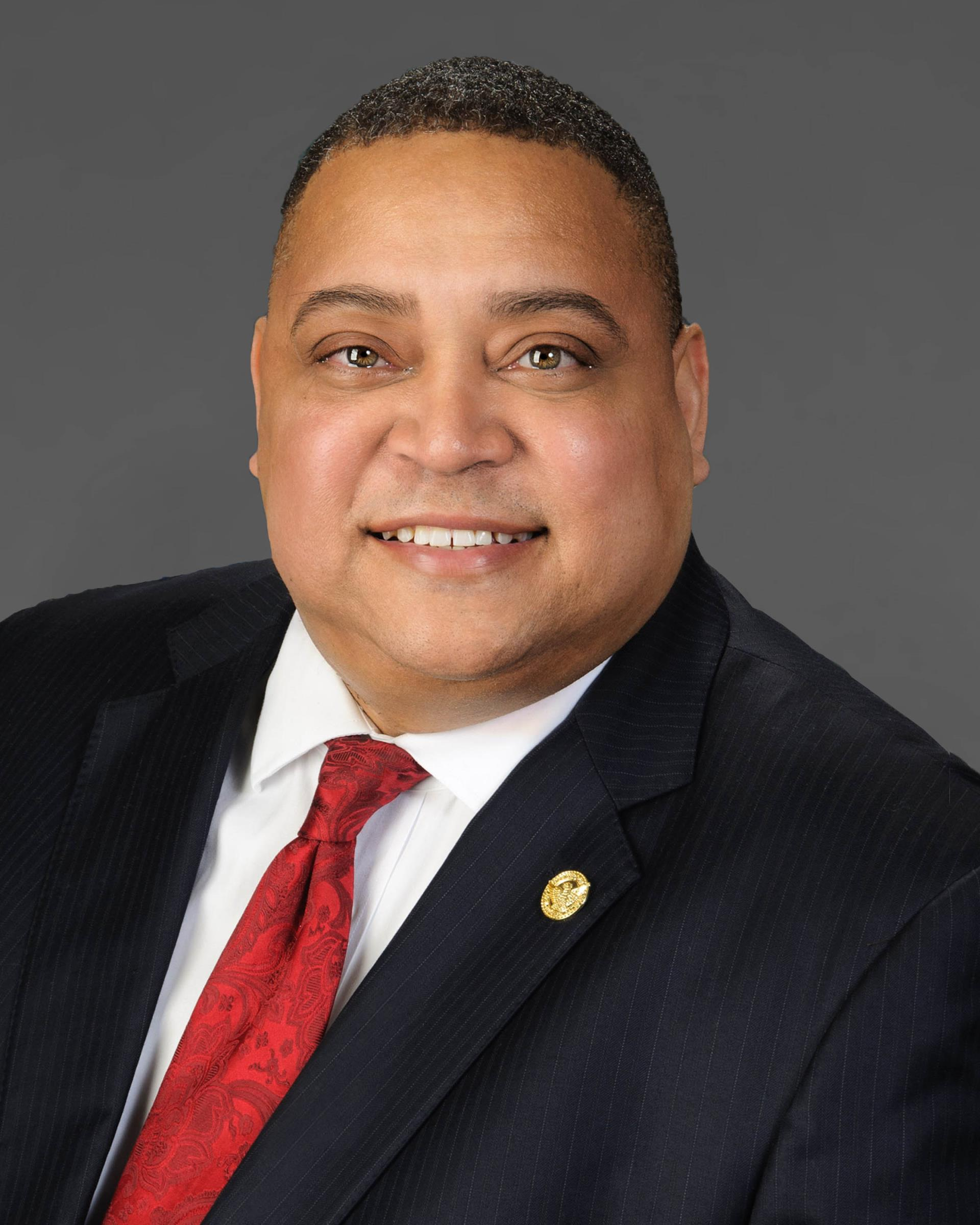

Member of the Atlanta City Council At-large Post 1
- Incumbent
- Assumed office January 4, 2010
- Preceded by: Ceasar Mitchell

Member of the Atlanta City Council, District 3
- In office January 3, 1994 – January 7, 2002
- Preceded by: Jabari Simama
- Succeeded by: Ivory Lee Young

Personal details
- Parent: Julian Bond
- Education: Morehouse College; Georgia State University
- Occupation: Politician

Michael Julian Bond is an American politician. Bond was elected to the Atlanta City Council in 1993 to represent District Three (1994–2001) and in 2009 to the At-Large Post 1 seat. He was sworn in on January 3, 1994. During his first tenure, he served as President pro tempore.

He is one of five children born to activist and politician Julian Bond and Alice Clopton. Bond attended Frederick Douglass High School, Morehouse College, and Georgia State University. He served on the board of directors of the American Diabetes Association from 2011 to 2013.
