= Mary Norwood =

American politician (born 1952)

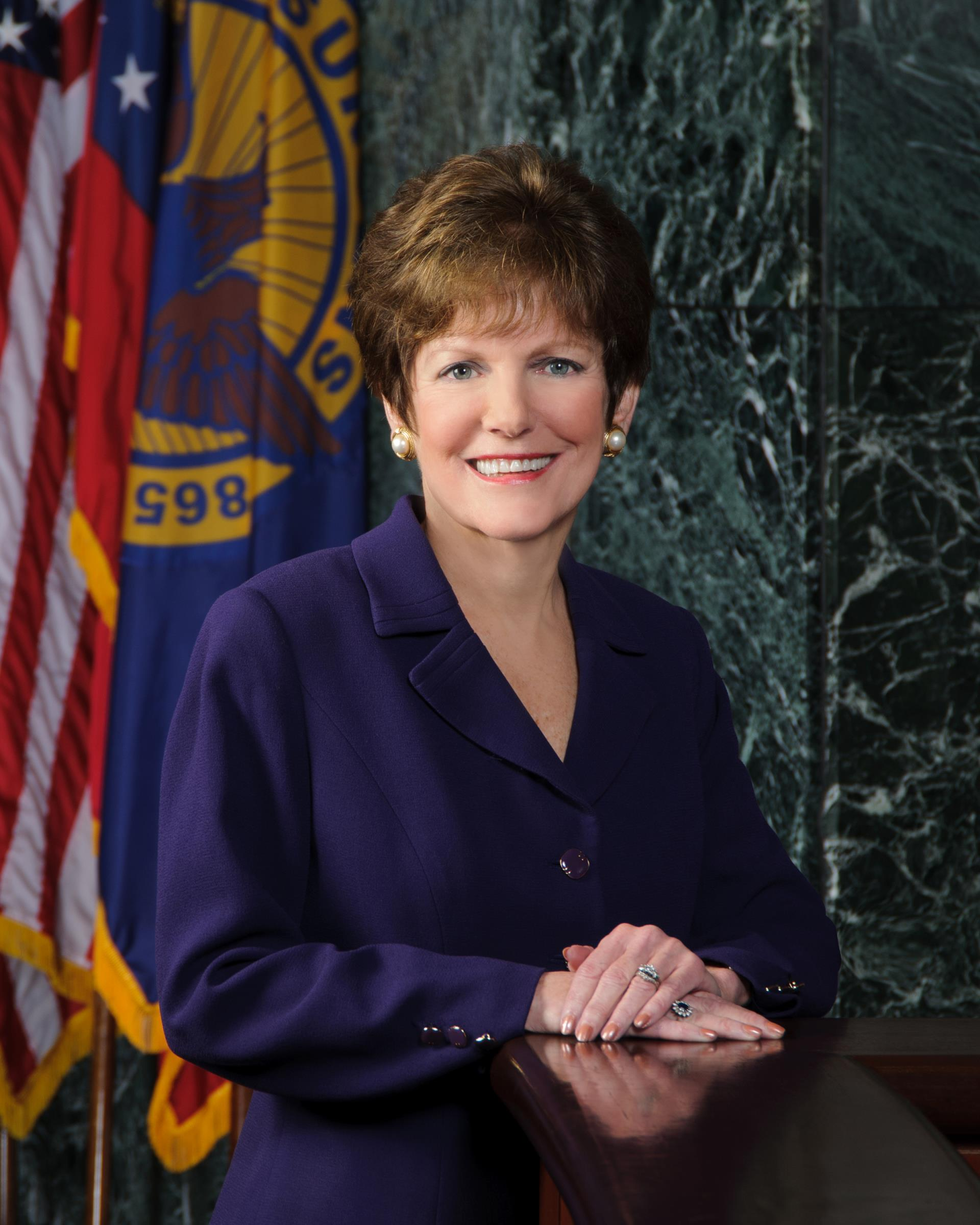

Member of the Atlanta City Council
- Incumbent
- Assumed office January 3, 2022
- Preceded by: J. P. Matzigkeit
- Constituency: 8th district
- In office January 2014 – January 2018
- Preceded by: Aaron Watson
- Succeeded by: Matt Westmoreland
- Constituency: at-large post 2
- In office January 7, 2002 – January 2010
- Preceded by: Julie Emmons
- Succeeded by: Aaron Watson
- Constituency: at-large post 2

Personal details
- Born: Mary Bush; March 25, 1952 (age 74) Augusta, Georgia, U.S.
- Party: Independent
- Spouse: Felton Norwood
- Education: Sweet Briar College; Emory University (BA)
- Website: Official website

Mary Norwood (born 1952) is an American businesswoman and politician who is a member of the Atlanta City Council. She was a candidate for mayor of Atlanta in 2009 and 2017. In both campaigns she advanced to the runoff, but respectively lost to Kasim Reed and Keisha Lance Bottoms by narrow margins. In addition to her mayoral runs, she represented city-wide posts on the Atlanta City Council from 2002 to 2010 and again from 2014 to 2018.

== Early life and education ==
Norwood was born in Augusta, Georgia. She attended Sweet Briar College, is a graduate of Emory University. She is married to Dr. Felton Norwood, who worked as a pediatrician at Piedmont Hospital for more than 30 years. She and her husband have two children together. She moved to Atlanta in the early 1980s, and around that time became involved in activism on neighborhood and community matters. She founded several local groups related to environmentalism and the preservation of green space, and served on the Mayor's Task Force on Race and Diversity during the mayoralty of Bill Campbell.

In the late 1990s and early 2000s (during the dot-com boom), Norwood owned OneCallWeb.com –a web-based broadcast voice messaging provider that facilitated telemarketing-style auto dialing.

== Atlanta City Council tenures ==
=== First at-large tenure (2002–2010) ===
From 2002 until 2010, Norwood served two terms as a member of the Atlanta City Council, holding the second of its at-large seats. She forwent re-election in 2009 in order to run for mayor. The Atlanta City Council has three at-large seats, which are each filled through separate elections. Norwood was first elected in 2001 to an at-large seat that incumbent Julia Emmons was ceding (Emmons opted to forgo re-election and instead run for council president).

Norwood was one of five white members on the black-majority council. Facing three other candidates, Norwood won a strong victory with approximately two-thirds of the vote. Norwood was unopposed for re-election in 2005.

Norwood voted against a tax increase proposal in June 2008, which did not pass. After the failure of the tax increase, the city administration responded by reducing public safety personnel and imposed a 10 percent pay cut on city workers to balance the budget. The City of Atlanta's budget was said to be balanced for several years. However, by March 2009, Atlanta's bond rating was downgraded by Standard & Poor's, a key credit rating agency. This downgrade resulted from four years of operating deficits, as well as longer-term pressures associated with the Atlanta's underfunded pensions, police overtime, and subsidies to several funds. Atlanta's solid waste and capital finance funds were also downgraded. In June 2009, the City Council voted 8–7, to increase the Atlanta property tax rate for general operations from 7.12 mills to 10.12 mills, a 42 percent increase. Atlanta is one of the few big cities nationwide to raise property taxes that year. Norwood voted against this increase, insisting that there was money to be found within Atlanta's budget. In both instances that she voted against tax increases, Norwood asked the city to reduce its spending on areas other than public safety personnel.

=== Second at-large tenure (2014–2018) ===
Norwood rejoined the city council in 2014, having won election to the city's second at-large seat in the 2013 election. She unseated incumbent Aaron Watson, a rarity in Atlanta City Council elections. Norwood was regarded to have benefited from strong name recognition as a result of her mayoral candidacy four years prior. In 2017, she opted to run for mayor a second time instead of seeking re-election to the council.

=== 8th district tenure (2022–present) ===
In 2021, Norwood ran unopposed for the 8th district seat on the city council. The seat represents parts of the Buckhead neighborhood and northwest Atlanta.

== Fulton County Board of Elections ==
In January 2013, Norwood was nominated by the local Republican Party as their choice to hold one of the seats that the party is entitled to on the Fulton County Board of Elections. She was soon after appointed to the seat by the Fulton County Board of Commissioners.

In November 2018, Norwood sought to rejoin the board as its chair, and received the support of local Republican state senators. However, the Republican attempt to have Norwood nominated and appointed as the board's chair failed.

== 2009 mayoral campaign ==
In 2009, Mary Norwood ran for mayor of Atlanta, advancing to a runoff election in which she was defeated by Kasim Reed.

Norwood received 46 percent of the vote on Election Day, the largest proportion of all the candidates, but as no candidate received a majority (more than 50% of the vote), she entered a runoff election on December 1, 2009. However, Kasim Reed received more votes in the runoff, and, after a recount, Norwood conceded.

According to an investigation by the staff of the Atlanta Journal-Constitution, campaign records show that the Georgia Democratic Party spent at least $165,000 to oppose Norwood. This, along with an eight percent jump in voters for the runoff contributed to Reed winning the mayoral runoff election by about 700 votes out of approximately 84,000 votes total.

Norwood campaigned on a platform of fiscal responsibility, and in a political advertisement she asserted that the city of Atlanta had misplaced $100 million. However, the city administration disputed the claim, explaining that $116 million was borrowed from the Watershed Management Department for city projects, and the money is being repaid by those departments.

During her campaign, Norwood successfully courted significant LGBT support by voicing her support for the legalization of same-sex marriage.

== 2010 county commissioner campaign ==
Norwood ran for a seat on the Fulton County Commission in 2010. However, the Fulton County Board of Elections rejected her petition to appear on the ballot because she filed it several hours past the deadline. A lawsuit filed by Norwood challenging the board's decision was unsuccessful.

== 2017 Atlanta mayoral election ==
Norwood filed to run in the 2017 Atlanta mayoral election in October 2016. Similar to the 2009 race, she has called for increased transparency in the municipal government, along with various additions to Atlanta's public transportation systems. According to the Norwood campaign website, her campaign is focused broadly on four issues: safety, transparency, sustainability, and prosperity. Norwood was initially considered the frontrunner in the race due to her strong performance in the 2009 runoff and her history of being elected city-wide.

The race attracted significant attention due to Norwood's status as an independent politician and the fact that, if elected, she would have been the first white mayor of Atlanta since Sam Massell in 1974. Several of Norwood's opponents and the Georgia Democratic Party attempted to portray her as a Republican.

In the first round of voting held November 7, Norwood came in second place with 20,144 votes. She advanced to a runoff with city councilor Keisha Lance Bottoms, who was endorsed by mayor Kasim Reed. Norwood and Bottoms participated in multiple debates and forums during the runoff campaign, and Norwood was endorsed by former candidates Cathy Woolard and Ceasar Mitchell and former Mayor Shirley Franklin. During the runoff campaign, Bottoms made an issue of Norwood's use of the word "thug" in comments she made before a Young Republicans meeting in 2009.

Norwood again sought to court LGBT voters, and was endorsed ahead of the runoff by the LGBT organization Georgia Equality.

Norwood lost to Keisha Lance Bottoms by 759 votes in the runoff on December 5. As in 2009, Norwood initially asked for a recount and refused to concede on election night. A recount later took place on December 14, but failed to give Norwood the edge. She eventually decided to not further contest the election results and conceded the race on December 21.

== 2020 presidential election lawsuit affidavit ==
Norwood signed an affidavit (notarized on November 29, 2020) in support of the plaintiffs in Pearson v. Kemp, a lawsuit that sought to invalidate Georgia's 16 electoral college votes that had been cast for then-president-elect Joe Biden as part of Republican-led attempts to overturn the 2020 United States presidential election.
