= 1977 Atlanta City Council election =

- October 4, 1977

The 1977 Atlanta City Council election was held on October 4, 1977. It was held concurrently with elections for mayor and school board.

== Council President ==
- Carl Ware
- Johnny Edwards

== District 1 ==
- Dean Broughton
- John H. Calhoun
- Harvey Collier
- Debby McCarty

== District 2 ==
- Sherman Barge
- Alveda King Beal
- John Sweet

== District 3 ==
- Randy Bacote
- Charles W. Bennett
- Bob Goodlett
- James Howard
- Harold C. Turner
- Lorenzo A. Wallace

== District 4 ==
- James Bond
- Robert Tree Reese

== District 5 ==
- Morris Finley
- Juanita Terry Williams

== District 6 ==
- Mary Davis
- William "Bill" Jones
- Esther Lefever

== District 7 ==
- Buddy Fowlkes
- Lou Hohenstein
- Hank Schwab

== District 8 ==
- Richard Guthman Jr

== District 9 ==
- Robert "Bob" Lane
- Arthur Langford Jr

== District 10 ==
- Thadeaus Dansby
- Ira Jackson
- Charlie Wright

== District 11 ==
- Curtis Dykes
- Henry Hutchins
- Jim Maddox
- Jan Meadows
- Bob Waymer

== District 12 ==
- John H. Harris
- Hugh Pierce
- Dozier Smith

== At-Large Post 13 ==
- E. Gregory Griggs
- Robb Pitts

== At-Large Post 14 ==
- Marvin S. Arrington Sr

== At-Large Post 15 ==
- Panke Bradley Miller

== At-Large Post 16 ==
- Barbara Miller Asher
- Fred First
- Jules Stine

== At-Large Post 17 ==
- Q. V. Williamson

== At-Large Post 18 ==
- Jack Summers
