= 1989 Atlanta City Council election =

- October 3, 1989; October 24, 1989 (runoff)

The 1989 Atlanta City Council election was held on October 3, 1989, for all 19 seats on the Atlanta City Council, with a runoff for some seats held on October 24. It was held concurrently with the 1989 elections for mayor and school board.

== Council President ==
- Marvin S. Arrington Sr. (i)

== District 1 ==
- Debby McCarty (i)

== District 2 ==
- Bill Campbell (i)

== District 3 ==
- John H. Lewis Sr (i)*
- Jabari Simama*
- Sam "Zeke" Riggins
- Hiram Scott
- William Wilson

== District 4 ==
- Thomas Cuffie
- A. Dimitrius Owens

== District 5 ==
- Mary Bankester
- Sherman Barge
- Jerome Carithers
- Davetta Johnson*
- Elizabeth Williams*

== District 6 ==
- Mary Davis

== District 7 ==
- Buddy Fowlkes
- Tom Alvis

== District 8 ==
- Victor D. Maslia
- Clair Muller

== District 9 ==
- Joe Amos Jr
- Archie Byron (i)*
- Dorothy Kerr
- William Patterson
- Jared L. Samples*
- Odessa Pope Wheeler
- George Williams

== District 10 ==
- Ira Jackson
- Charles R. Mason

== District 11 ==
- Abraham Davis
- Jim Maddox
- Vangie Watkins

== District 12 ==
- Fred Martin
- Dozier Smith*
- Gloria Bromell Tinubu

== At-Large Post 13 ==
- Robb Pitts

== At-Large Post 14 ==
- Carolyn Long Banks

== At-Large Post 15 ==
- Sheila M. Brown
- Charles T. Huddleston

== At-Large Post 16 ==
- Barbara Miller Asher

== At-Large Post 17 ==
- Myrtle R. Davis

== At-Large Post 18 ==
- Morris Finley
