= 1985 Atlanta City Council election =

- October 8, 1985

The 1985 Atlanta City Council election was held on October 8, 1985, for all 19 seats on the Atlanta City Council. It was held concurrently with the 1985 elections for mayor and school board.

== Council President ==
- Marvin S. Arrington Sr.

== District 1 ==
- Sam Butts
- Michael Langford
- Debby McCarty
- Greg Pridgeon
- Ernest Williams

== District 2 ==
- Bill Campbell
- Grace Davis
- Anglo Lipecons

== District 3 ==
- Uradee Hill
- James Howard*
- John H. Lewis Sr*
- Charles McCant

== District 4 ==
- Thomas Cuffie
- Maddix Moore
- A. Dimitrius Owens
- Clara S. Rogers

== District 5 ==
- Ike P. Dendy
- Gregory Eubanks
- Morris Finley*
- J. Denis Jackson
- Hosea Williams*
- Johnny Williams

== Districts 6 ==
- Mary Davis

== District 7 ==
- Buddy Fowlkes

== District 8 ==
- Richard Guthman Jr

== District 9 ==
- Archie Byron
- Michael Elms
- Frank Jones
- Rita M. Moore
- Benny T. Smith
- Roy Wolfe

== District 10 ==
- Ira Jackson
- Juner Norris
- Leila Waters

== District 11 ==
- Abraham Davis
- Jim Maddox
- Sylvester Stinson
- Vangie Watkins

== District 12 ==
- James Beasley Jr
- Fred Martin Jr
- Bernard McConnell
- Dozier Smith

== At-Large Post 13 ==
- Danny Feig
- Revonia T. Freeman
- Robb Pitts

== At-Large Post 14 ==
- Carolyn Long Banks

== At-Large Post 15 ==
- Mary Bankester
- Tom Millican
- Elaine Valentine

== At-Large Post 16 ==
- Barbara Asher Miller
- Johnny Edwards

== At-Large Post 17 ==
- Myrtle R. Davis
- Willie B. Ivey

== At-Large Post 18 ==
- John Lewis
- Robert L. Thompson
