= 1993 Atlanta City Council election =

- November 2, 1993; November 23, 1993 (runoff)

The 1993 Atlanta City Council election was held on November 2, 1993, for all 19 seats on the Atlanta City Council, with a runoff for several seats held on November 23. It was held concurrently with the 1993 elections for mayor and school board.

Incumbents Debbi McCarty, Ira Jackson, Bill Campbell, Thomas Cuffie, Buddy Fowlkes and Myrtle Davis did not run for re-election. As of 2025, it is the most recent election to use six at-large post seats, with three of the at-large seats being abolished through a 1996 charter reform.

== Council President ==
- Marvin S. Arrington Sr. (i)
- Jabari Simama, councilmember

== District 1 ==
- Dana J. Bolden
- Soisette Lumpkin
- Fred Martin II
- Vern McCarty*
- Scott Petersen
- Gregory Pridgeon*
- Carolyn S. White

== District 2 ==
- Chester Dixon
- Ayisha Jeffries*
- L. Eric Spivey
- Debi Starnes*
- Georgianne Thomas

== District 3 ==
- Khadijah Abdur-Rahman
- Michael Julian Bond*
- Joel Gresham
- Wallace Jackson
- Hiram Scott*
- Jackie Southern

== District 4 ==
- Kim Andrews
- Mary Dancy
- Dennis A. Long*
- Leonard E. Tate
- Warren Taylor
- India X. Willett
- Cleta Winslow*

== District 5 ==
- Davetta Johnson (i)
- Hubert Merchant
- Ronald A. Pugh

== District 6 ==
- Mary Davis
- Joe Kelly
- Andy Loftis

== District 7 ==
- Jim Garcia
- Lee Morris

== District 8 ==
- Clair M. Muller (i)

== District 9 ==
- Kathy Carter
- Ari Casper-Silberman*
- Jared L. Samples*

== District 10 ==
- C. T. Martin

== District 11 ==
- Abraham Davis
- Jim Maddox (i)
- John McClure
- Jackie Patterson

== District 12 ==
- Gloria Tinubu
- Dozier Smith (i)

== At-Large Post 13 ==
- Robb Pitts (i)

== At-Large Post 14 ==
- Carolyn Long Banks
- John H. Lewis Sr

== At-Large Post 15 ==
- Sheila Martin Brown (i)

== At-Large Post 16 ==
- Barbara Miller Asher (i)
- Jackie Livingston

== At-Large Post 17 ==
- Doug Alexander*
- Lenard "Butch" Bryant
- Rick Evereteze
- Malcolm, L.
- Harold Morgan
- Eric Thomas*

== At-Large Post 18 ==
- Pamela Alexander*
- Morris Finley (i)*
- Tracy T. Swearingen
