= 1997 Atlanta City Council election =

Local election in Georgia

- November 4, 1997; November 25, 1997 (runoff)

The 1997 Atlanta City Council election occurred on November 4, 1997, with a runoff election held on November 25, 1997. The election and runoff took place concurrently with the 1997 Atlanta mayoral election.

It was the first election since three of the six at-large posts were abolished.

== Council President ==
- Robb Pitts, won
- Debby McCarty
- Carolyn Long Banks
- Alveta King
- Dave Walker

== At-Large Post 1 ==
- Mable Thomas, for state representative; won
- Paul Bolster
- Marcia Briscoe
- Chester Dixon
- Khadijah Abdur-Rahman
- John Lewis Sr.
- Sidney Wood Jr.

== At-Large Post 2 ==
- Julie Emmons, won
- Sheila Martin-Brown (i)
- John Garst

== At-Large Post 3 ==
- Doug Alexander (i), won
- Pam Alexander (i)
- Thomas Cox Jr
- Leonard Tate
- Rhonda Finley
- Virginia Gray

== District 1 ==
- Vern McCarty (i), won
- Malcolm Gideons
- Ruthie Garrett-Walls
- Fred Martin II
- Joe Gadson
- Angela Stovall
- Gary Duncan Jr.

== District 2 ==
- Debi Starnes (i), won
- Jim Boyd III
- James Lewis

== District 3 ==
- Michael Julian Bond (i), won
- Raymond Davis
- Hiram Scott
- Al Stewart
- Kevin Jones

== District 4 ==
- Cleta Winslow (i), won
- Georgianne Thomas
- Kathryn Flowers

== District 5 ==
- Sherry Dorsey, won
- Natalyn Mosby Archibong
- Stanley Jackson
- Hubert Merchant Jr.
- Steven Suna
- Sulton Charles Ellison
- Annie Ward
- Mark Henderson

== District 6 ==
- Cathy Woolard, won
- Mary Davis (i)
- Joe Gordon
- Joe Kelly

== District 7 ==
- Lee Morris (i, uncontested), won

== District 8 ==
- Clair Muller (i), won
- Frederick Anton

== District 9 ==
- Felicia Moore, won
- Jarrod Samples (i)

== District 10 ==
- C. T. Martin (i), won
- Juner Norris

== District 11 ==
- Jim Maddox (i), won
- Lonnie Hollis
- Vangie Watkins
- Edith Lapido
- James Smith

== District 12 ==
- Derrick Boazman, won
- Richard Byrd
- Julie Brown
- Lionell Gantt
