= 2012 United States House of Representatives elections in South Carolina =

- November 6, 2012

All 7 South Carolina seats to the United States House of Representatives
| | Majority party | Minority party |
|---|---|---|
| Party | Republican | Democratic |
| Last election | 5 | 1 |
| Seats won | 6 | 1 |
| Seat change | ▲1 | Steady |
| Popular vote | 1,026,129 | 742,805 |
| Percentage | 56.92% | 41.20% |
| Swing | ▲0.71% | ▲0.65% |

Republican
50–60%
60–70%
70–80%
90–100%
Democratic
40–50%
50–60%
60–70%
80–90%
90–100%
Winners
Republican hold
Republican gain
Democratic hold

The 2012 United States House of Representatives elections in South Carolina were held on Tuesday, November 6, 2012, and elected the seven U.S. representatives from the state of South Carolina. This was increase of one seat as a result of reapportionment due to the increase of population in South Carolina as reported in the 2010 United States census. The elections coincided with the elections of other federal and state offices, including a quadrennial presidential election. The people of South Carolina elected six Republicans and one Democrat to represent the state in the 113th United States Congress.

== Overview ==
United States House of Representatives elections in South Carolina, 2012
| Party | Votes | Percentage | Seats | +/– |
|---|---|---|---|---|
| Republican | 1,026,129 | 56.92% | 6 | +1 |
| Democratic | 742,805 | 41.20% | 1 | — |
| Green | 16,310 | 0.90% | 0 | — |
| Libertarian | 6,334 | 0.35% | 0 | — |
| Others | 11,156 | 0.62% | 0 | — |
| Totals | 1,802,734 | 100.00% | 7 | +1 |

== Redistricting ==
On July 26, 2011, the South Carolina House of Representatives and Senate passed a compromise redistricting bill which would place the new 7th district in the Pee Dee region. The bill was signed into law by Governor Nikki Haley on August 1.

Under the 1965 Voting Rights Act, South Carolina's congressional redistricting had to be pre-cleared by the U.S. Department of Justice or the United States District Court for the District of Columbia before it could be enacted. The Department of Justice precleared the map in October 2011; a subsequent lawsuit brought by six voters for discrimination under the new lines was dismissed by the United States District Court for the District of South Carolina in March 2012.

== District 1 ==
2012 South Carolina's 1st congressional district election
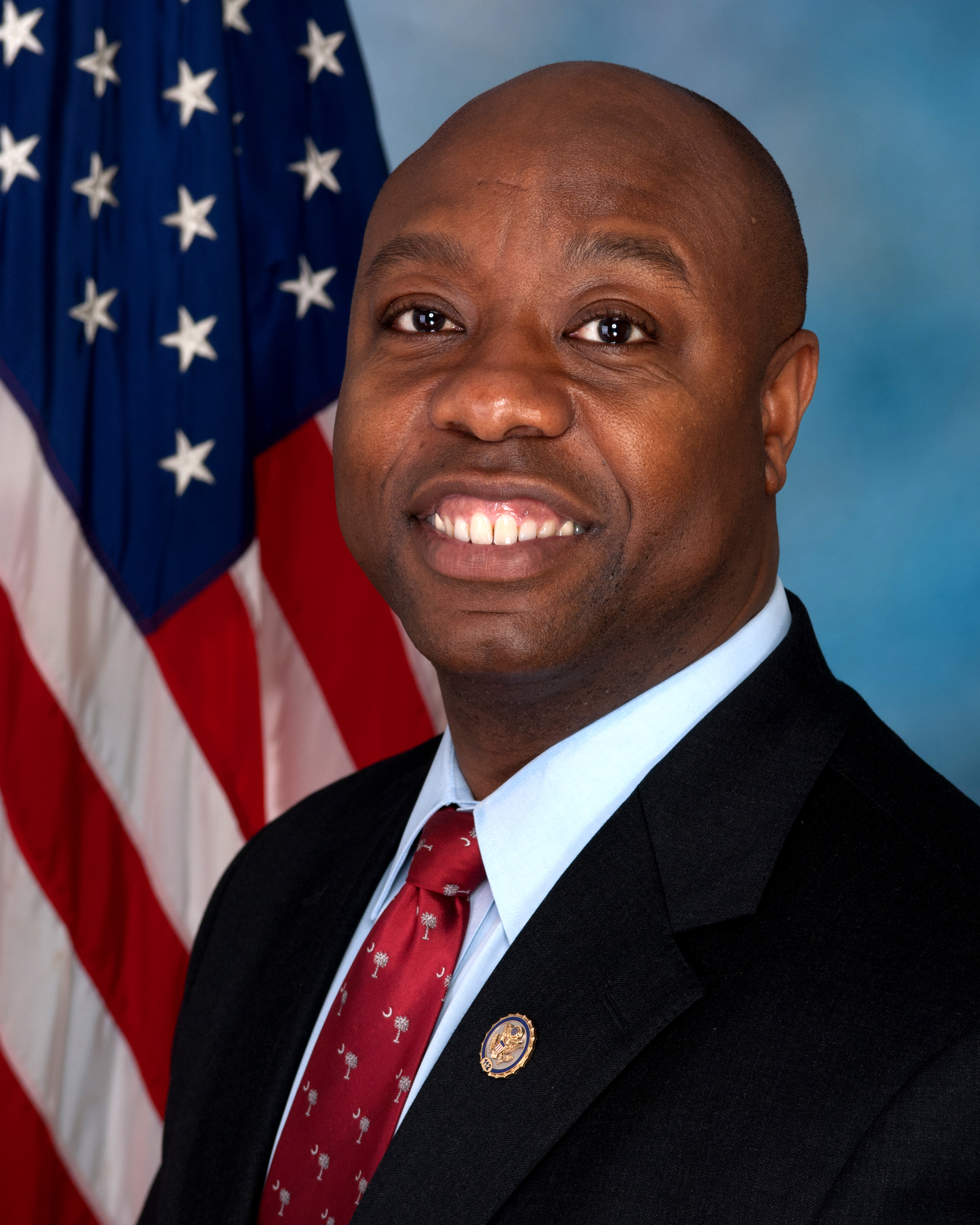

| Nominee | Tim Scott | Bobbie Rose |
| Party | Republican | Democratic |
| Popular vote | 179,908 | 103,557 |
| Percentage | 62.0% | 35.7% |
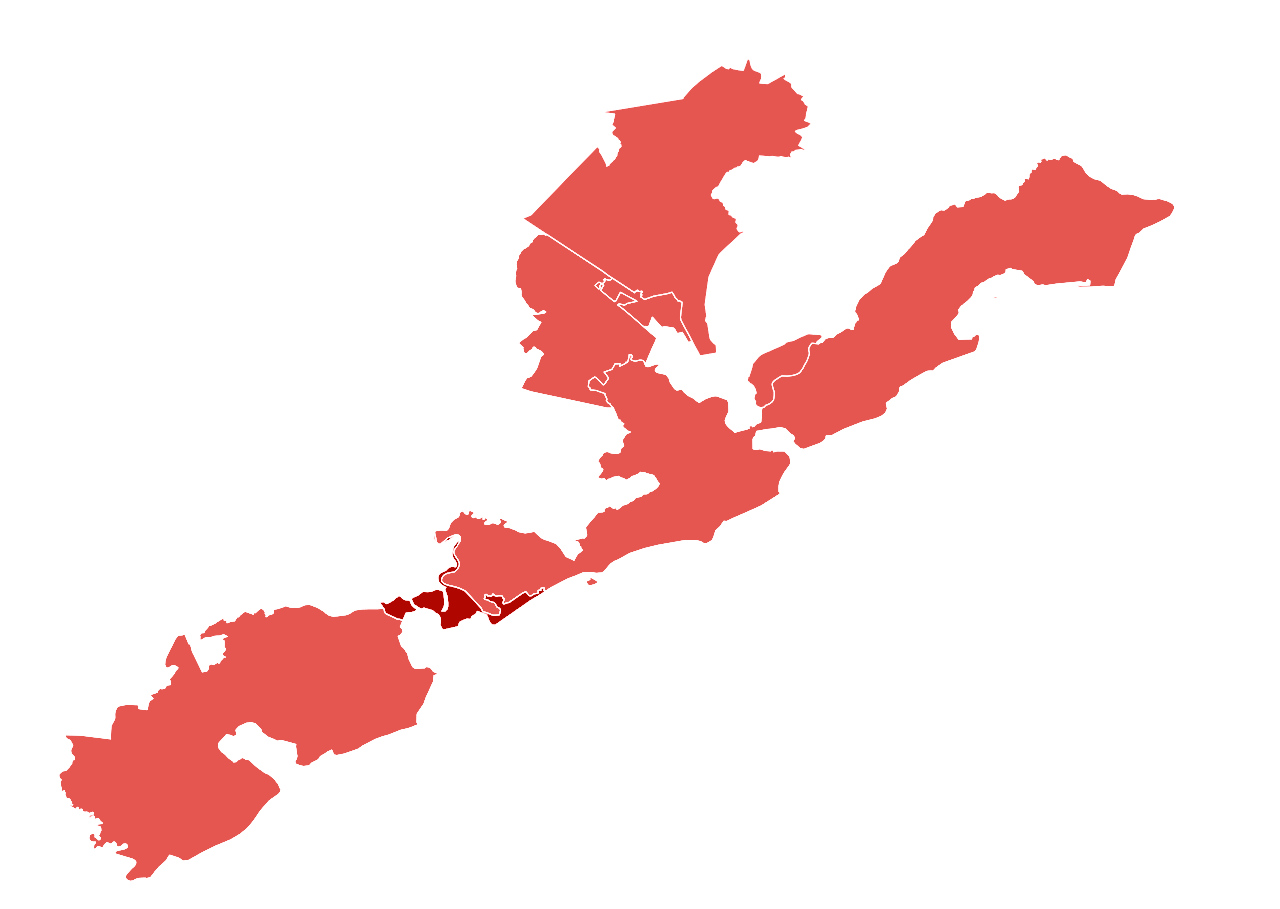
- County results Scott: 60–70% 70–80% 80–90%
U.S. Representative before election
Tim Scott
Republican
Elected U.S. Representative
Tim Scott
Republican

In redistricting, the 1st district was moved south along the coast to include Hilton Head and parts of Charleston County, and was expected to remain favorable to Republicans. Republican Tim Scott, who represented the 1st district since January 2011, sought re-election.

=== Republican primary ===
==== Candidates ====
===== Nominee =====
- Tim Scott, incumbent U.S. Representative

=== Democratic primary ===
==== Candidates ====
===== Nominee =====
- Bobbie Rose, former teacher and realtor

=== General election ===
==== Endorsements ====
Tim Scott (R)

Organizations

- Campaign for Working Families
- Huck PAC
- NRA Political Victory Fund
- National Right to Life Committee
- United States Chamber of Commerce
Bobbie Rose (D)

Labor unions

- AFL-CIO
- International Association of Fire Fighters
- United Steelworkers

Organizations

- Alliance for Retired Americans
- Working Families Party

Individuals

- Claudia J. Kennedy, retired Army Lieutenant general

==== Predictions ====
| Source | Ranking | As of |
|---|---|---|
| The Cook Political Report | Safe R | November 5, 2012 |
| Rothenberg | Safe R | November 2, 2012 |
| Roll Call | Safe R | November 4, 2012 |
| Sabato's Crystal Ball | Safe R | November 5, 2012 |
| NY Times | Safe R | November 4, 2012 |
| RCP | Safe R | November 4, 2012 |
| The Hill | Safe R | November 4, 2012 |

==== Results ====
South Carolina's 1st congressional district, 2012
| Party | Candidate | Votes | % |
|---|---|---|---|
| Republican | Tim Scott (incumbent) | 179,908 | 62.0 |
| Democratic | Bobbie G. Rose | 103,557 | 35.7 |
| Libertarian | Keith Blandford | 6,334 | 2.2 |
| n/a | Write-ins | 214 | 0.1 |
| Total votes | | 290,013 | 100.0 |
| Republican hold | | | |

== District 2 ==
2012 South Carolina's 2nd congressional district election
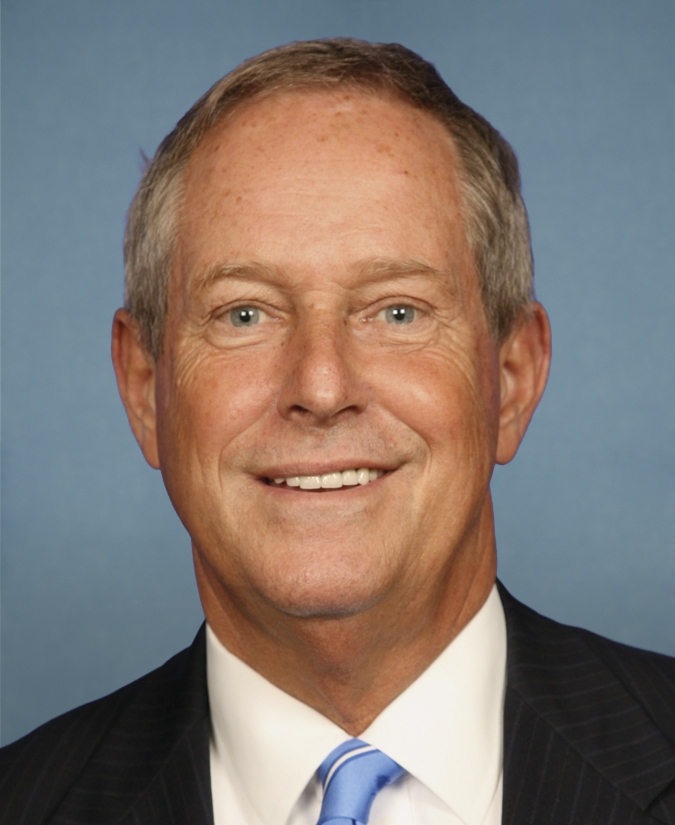
| Nominee | Joe Wilson |
| Party | Republican |
| Popular vote | 196,116 |
| Percentage | 96.3% |
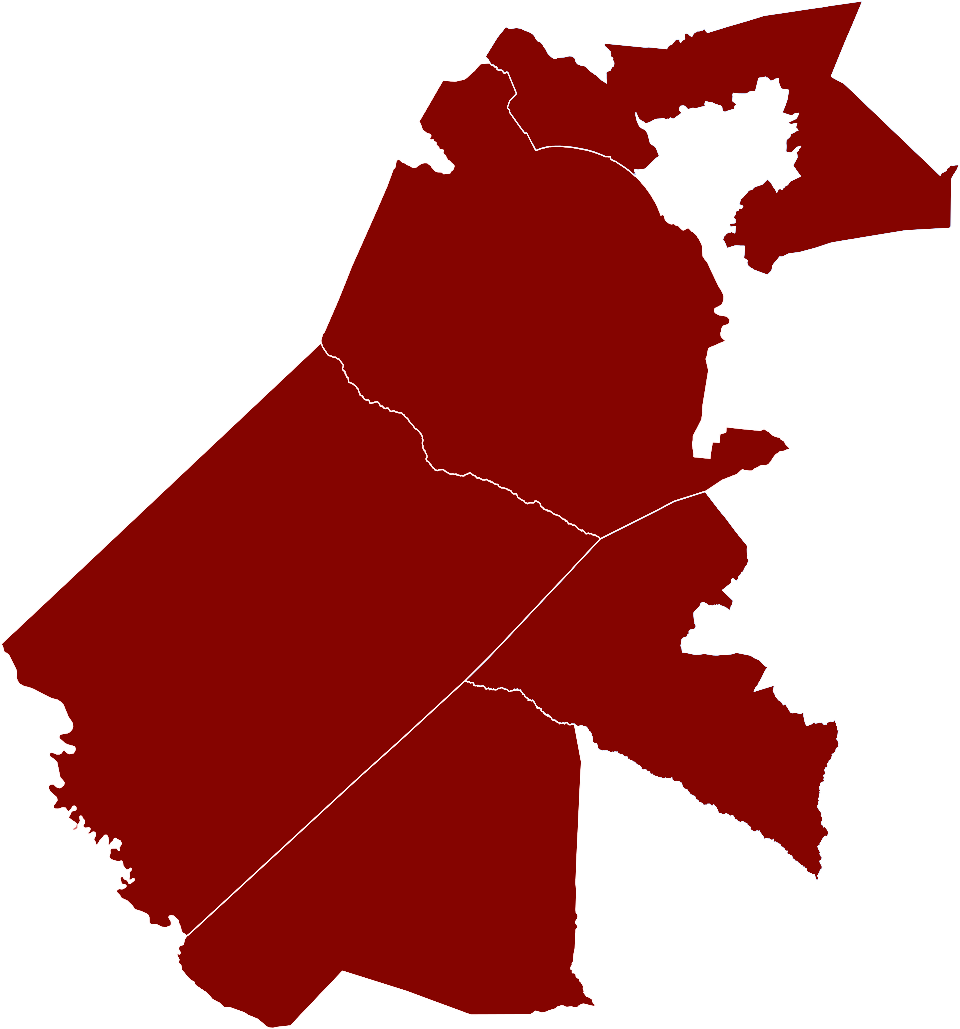
- County results Wilson: >90%
U.S. Representative before election
Joe Wilson
Republican
Elected U.S. Representative
Joe Wilson
Republican

In redistricting, Hilton Head and surrounding areas as well as counties on the state's southern border were removed from the 2nd district, which afterwards included all of Aiken County. Republican Joe Wilson, who represented the 2nd district since 2001, sought re-election.

=== Republican primary ===
==== Candidates ====
===== Nominee =====
- Joe Wilson, incumbent U.S. Representative

===== Eliminated in primary =====
- Phil Black, businessman and candidate for this seat in 2008 & 2010

=== Democratic primary ===
No candidate filed to run on the Democratic side.

==== Primary results ====
Republican primary results
| Party | Candidate | Votes | % |
|---|---|---|---|
| Republican | Joe Wilson (incumbent) | 23,062 | 80.6 |
| Republican | Phil Black | 5,557 | 19.4 |
| Total votes | | 28,619 | 100.0 |

=== General election ===
==== Endorsements ====
Joe Wilson (R)

Organizations

- Campaign for Working Families
- Huck PAC
- NRA Political Victory Fund
- National Right to Life Committee
- United States Chamber of Commerce

==== Predictions ====
| Source | Ranking | As of |
|---|---|---|
| The Cook Political Report | Safe R | November 5, 2012 |
| Rothenberg | Safe R | November 2, 2012 |
| Roll Call | Safe R | November 4, 2012 |
| Sabato's Crystal Ball | Safe R | November 5, 2012 |
| NY Times | Safe R | November 4, 2012 |
| RCP | Safe R | November 4, 2012 |
| The Hill | Safe R | November 4, 2012 |

==== Results ====
South Carolina's 2nd congressional district, 2012
| Party | Candidate | Votes | % |
|---|---|---|---|
| Republican | Joe Wilson (incumbent) | 196,116 | 96.3 |
| n/a | Write-ins | 7,602 | 3.7 |
| Total votes | | 203,718 | 100.0 |
| Republican hold | | | |

== District 3 ==
2012 South Carolina's 3rd congressional district election
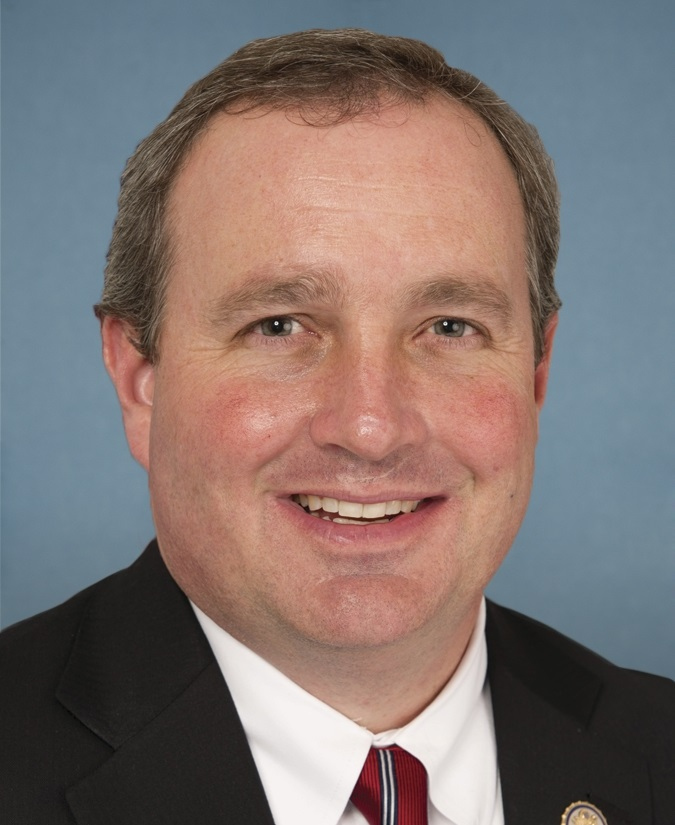

| Nominee | Jeff Duncan | Brian Doyle |
| Party | Republican | Democratic |
| Popular vote | 169,512 | 84,735 |
| Percentage | 66.5% | 33.3% |
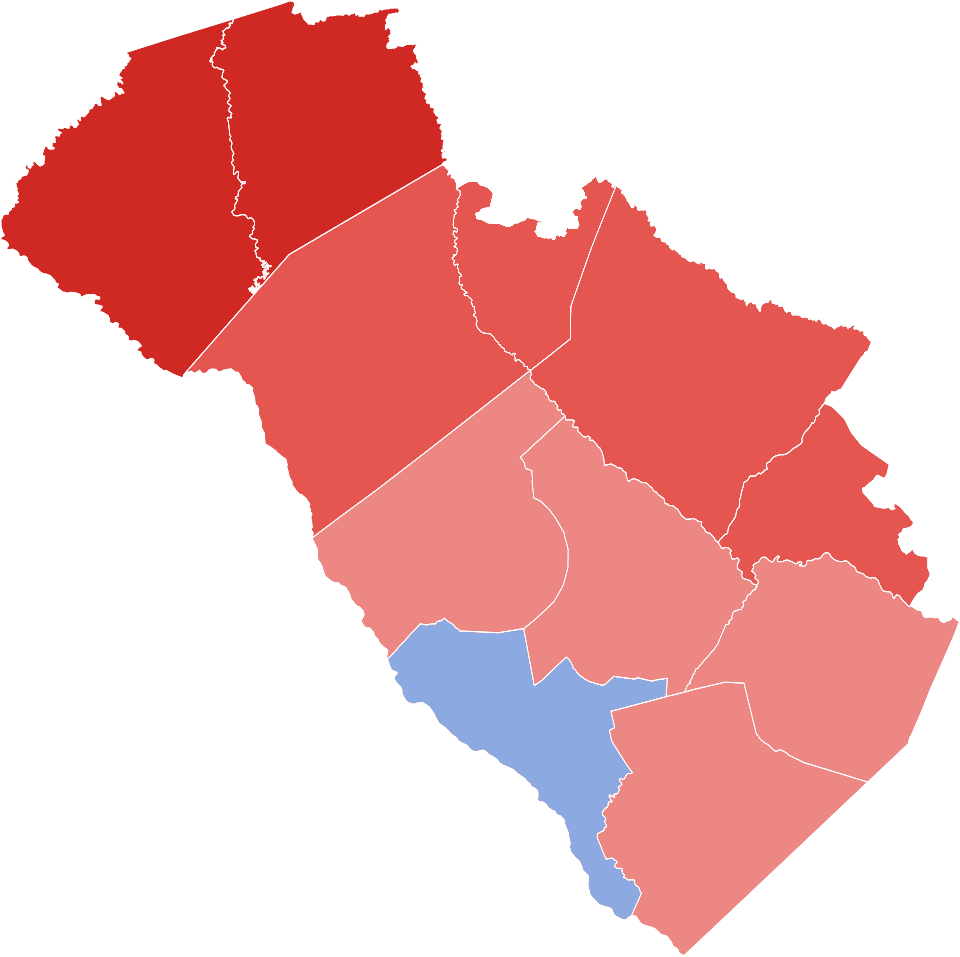
- County results Duncan: 50-60% 60-70% 70-80% Doyle: 50-60%
U.S. Representative before election
Jeff Duncan
Republican
Elected U.S. Representative
Jeff Duncan
Republican

Redistricting added parts of Newberry and Greenville counties to the 3rd district as parts of Aiken County were removed. The district was expected to continue to favor Republicans. Republican Jeff Duncan, who represented the 3rd district since January 2011, sought re-election.

=== Republican primary ===
==== Candidates ====
===== Nominee =====
- Jeff Duncan, incumbent U.S. Representative

=== Democratic primary ===
==== Candidates ====
===== Nominee =====
- Brian Doyle, radio talk show host

===== Eliminated in primary =====
- Cason Gaither, former field Organizer for Vincent Sheheen's gubernatorial campaign in 2010

==== Primary results ====
Democratic primary results
| Party | Candidate | Votes | % |
|---|---|---|---|
| Democratic | Brian Doyle | 4,782 | 66.0 |
| Democratic | Cason Gaither | 2,464 | 34.0 |
| Total votes | | 7,246 | 100.0 |

=== General election ===
==== Endorsements ====
Jeff Duncan (R)

Organizations

- Campaign for Working Families
- Huck PAC
- NRA Political Victory Fund
- National Right to Life Committee
- United States Chamber of Commerce

==== Predictions ====
| Source | Ranking | As of |
|---|---|---|
| The Cook Political Report | Safe R | November 5, 2012 |
| Rothenberg | Safe R | November 2, 2012 |
| Roll Call | Safe R | November 4, 2012 |
| Sabato's Crystal Ball | Safe R | November 5, 2012 |
| NY Times | Safe R | November 4, 2012 |
| RCP | Safe R | November 4, 2012 |
| The Hill | Safe R | November 4, 2012 |

==== Results ====
South Carolina's 3rd congressional district, 2012
| Party | Candidate | Votes | % |
|---|---|---|---|
| Republican | Jeff Duncan (incumbent) | 169,512 | 66.5 |
| Democratic | Bryan Ryan B. Doyle | 84,735 | 33.3 |
| n/a | Write-ins | 516 | 0.2 |
| Total votes | | 254,763 | 100.0 |
| Republican hold | | | |

== District 4 ==
2012 South Carolina's 4th congressional district election
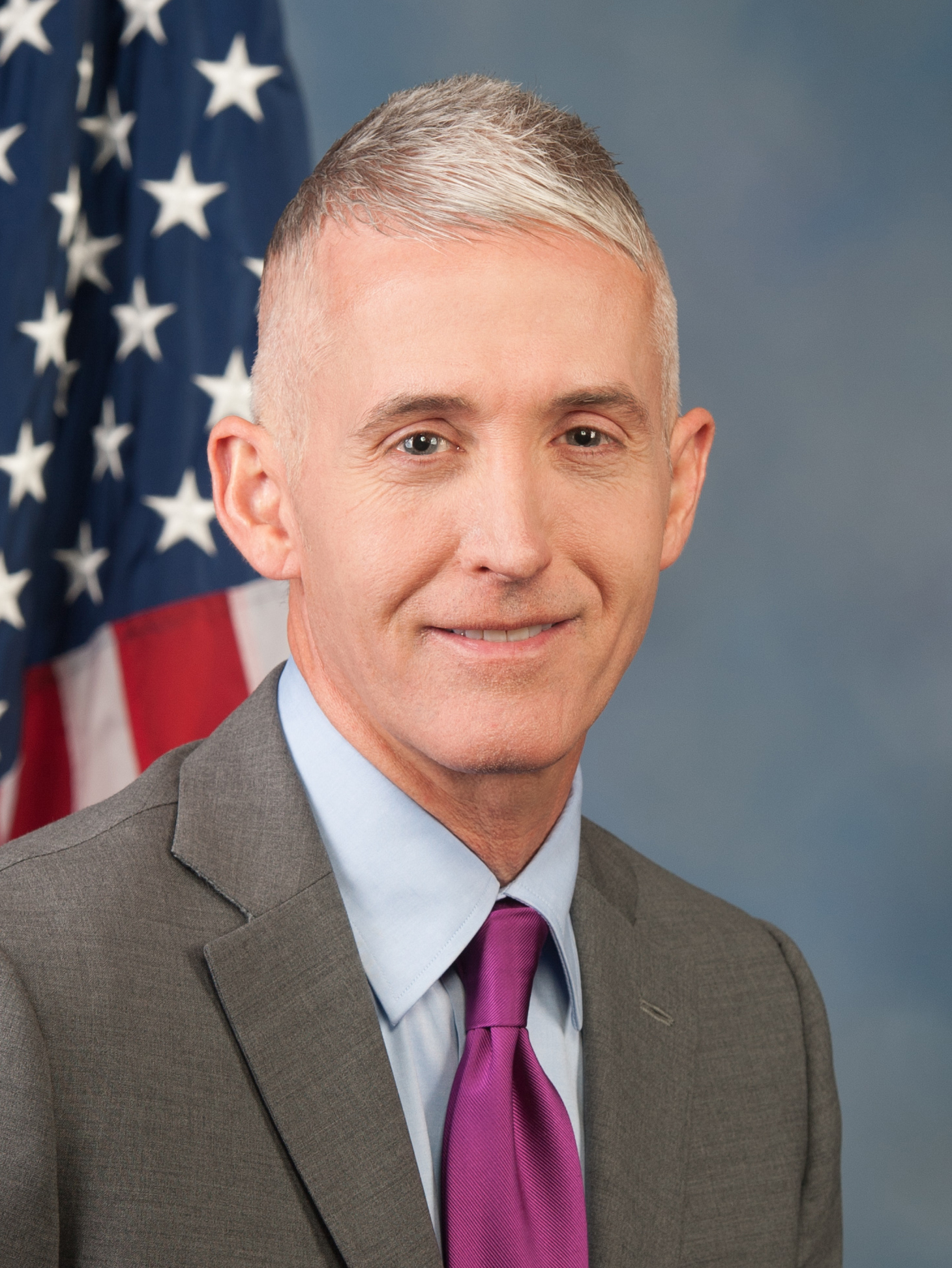

| Nominee | Trey Gowdy | Deb Morrow |
| Party | Republican | Democratic |
| Popular vote | 173,201 | 89,964 |
| Percentage | 64.9% | 33.7% |
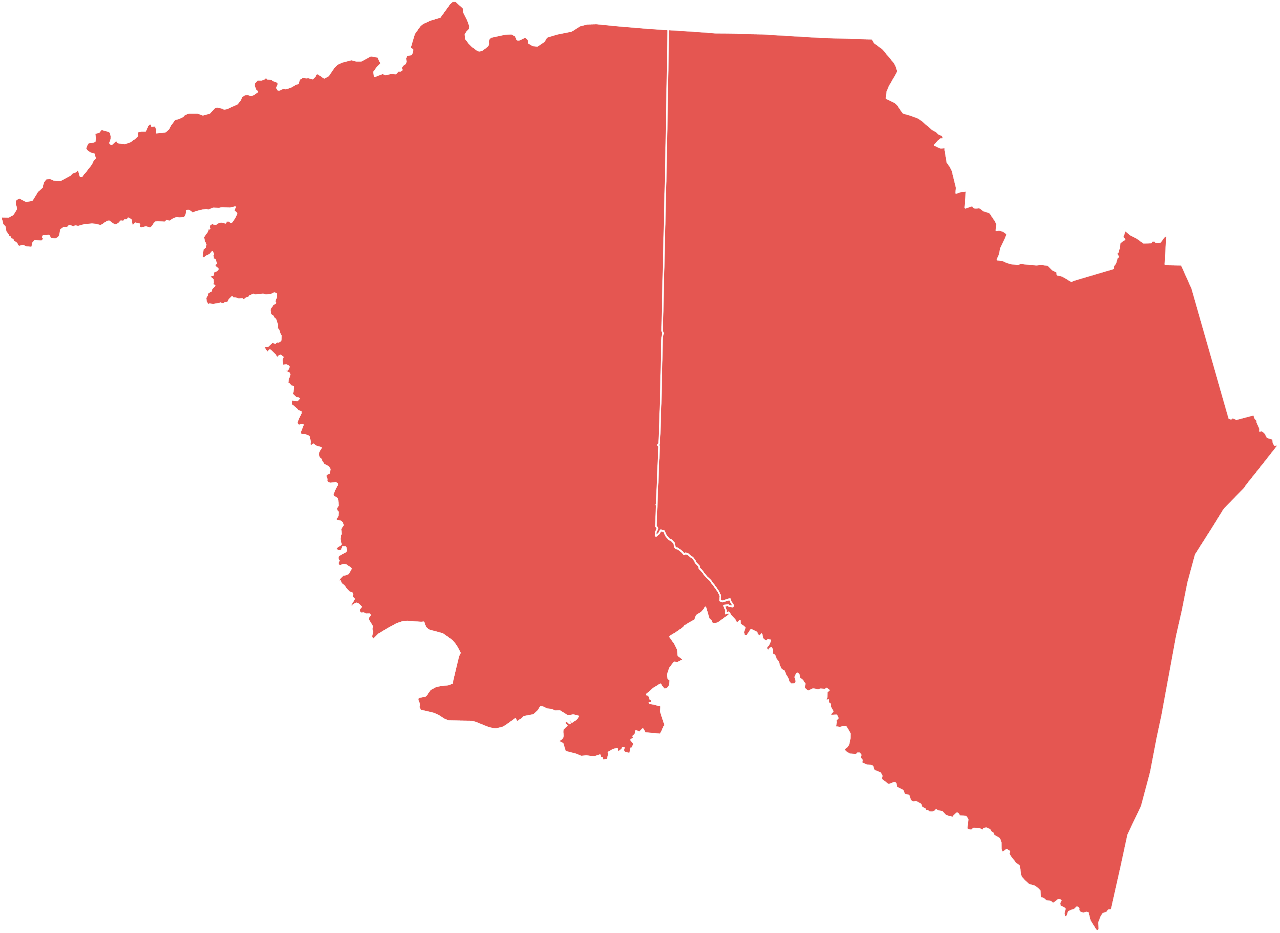
- County results Gowdy: 60-70%
U.S. Representative before election
Trey Gowdy
Republican
Elected U.S. Representative
Trey Gowdy
Republican

The redrawn 4th district maintained a balance between the counties of Greenville and Spartanburg, and was expected to continue to favor Republicans. Republican Trey Gowdy, who represented the 4th district since January 2011, sought re-election.

=== Republican primary ===
==== Candidates ====
===== Nominee =====
- Trey Gowdy, incumbent U.S. Representative

=== Democratic primary ===
==== Candidates ====
===== Nominee =====
- Deb Morrow, retired computer system designer

===== Eliminated in primary =====
- Jimmy Tobias, businessman

==== Primary results ====
Democratic primary results
| Party | Candidate | Votes | % |
|---|---|---|---|
| Democratic | Deb Morrow | 3,678 | 70.6 |
| Democratic | Jimmy Tobias | 1,528 | 29.4 |
| Total votes | | 5,206 | 100.0 |

=== General election ===
==== Endorsements ====
Trey Gowdy (R)

Organizations

- Campaign for Working Families
- NRA Political Victory Fund
- National Right to Life Committee
- United States Chamber of Commerce

==== Predictions ====
| Source | Ranking | As of |
|---|---|---|
| The Cook Political Report | Safe R | November 5, 2012 |
| Rothenberg | Safe R | November 2, 2012 |
| Roll Call | Safe R | November 4, 2012 |
| Sabato's Crystal Ball | Safe R | November 5, 2012 |
| NY Times | Safe R | November 4, 2012 |
| RCP | Safe R | November 4, 2012 |
| The Hill | Safe R | November 4, 2012 |

==== Results ====
South Carolina's 4th congressional district, 2012
| Party | Candidate | Votes | % |
|---|---|---|---|
| Republican | Trey Gowdy (incumbent) | 173,201 | 64.9 |
| Democratic | Deb Morrow | 89,964 | 33.7 |
| Green | Jeff Sumerel | 3,390 | 1.3 |
| n/a | Write-ins | 329 | 0.1 |
| Total votes | | 266,884 | 100.0 |
| Republican hold | | | |

== District 5 ==
2012 South Carolina's 5th congressional district election
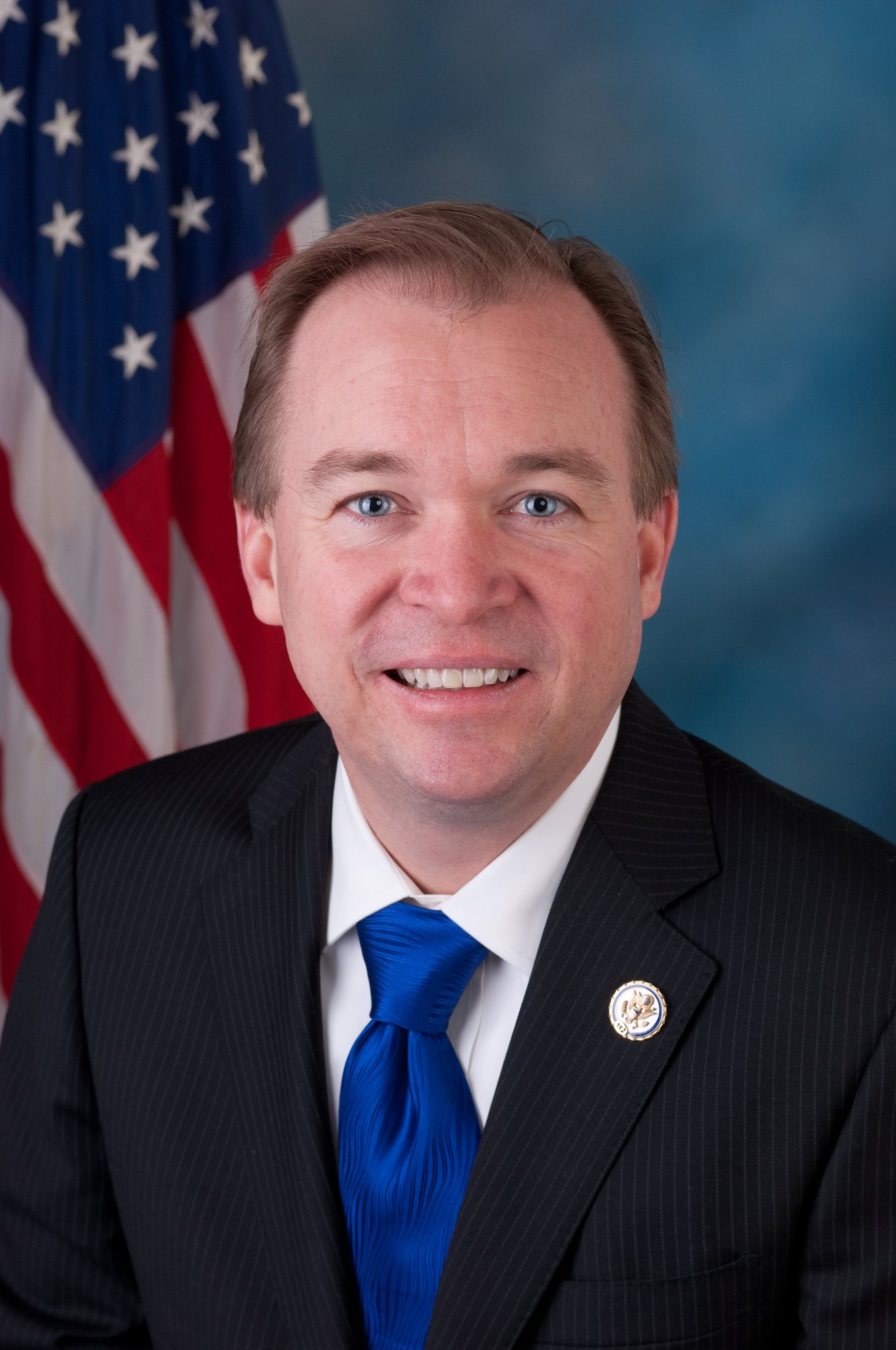

| Nominee | Mick Mulvaney | Joyce Knott |
| Party | Republican | Democratic |
| Popular vote | 154,324 | 123,443 |
| Percentage | 55.5% | 44.4% |
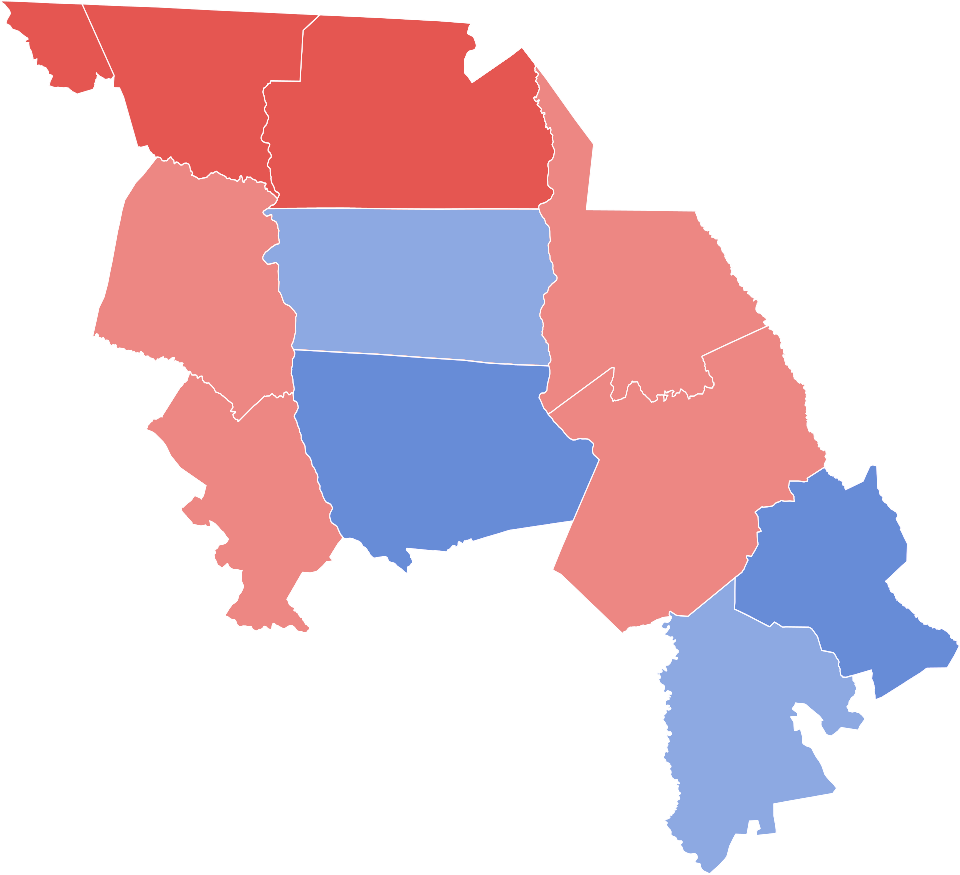
- County results Mulvaney: 50-60% 60-70% Knott: 50-60% 60-70%
U.S. Representative before election
Mick Mulvaney
Republican
Elected U.S. Representative
Mick Mulvaney
Republican

The 5th district, which extended from the border of North Carolina to the outskirts of Sumter, was made more favorable to Republicans in redistricting. Republican Mick Mulvaney, who represented the 5th district since January 2011, sought re-election.

=== Republican primary ===
==== Candidates ====
===== Nominee =====
- Mick Mulvaney, incumbent U.S. Representative

=== Democratic primary ===
==== Candidates ====
===== Nominee =====
- Joyce Knott, businesswoman

=== General election ===
==== Endorsements ====
Mick Mulvaney (R)

Organizations

- Campaign for Working Families
- Huck PAC
- NRA Political Victory Fund
- National Right to Life Committee
- United States Chamber of Commerce
Joyce Knott (D)

Labor unions

- AFL-CIO

Organizations

- Working Families Party

==== Predictions ====
| Source | Ranking | As of |
|---|---|---|
| The Cook Political Report | Safe R | November 5, 2012 |
| Rothenberg | Safe R | November 2, 2012 |
| Roll Call | Safe R | November 4, 2012 |
| Sabato's Crystal Ball | Safe R | November 5, 2012 |
| NY Times | Safe R | November 4, 2012 |
| RCP | Safe R | November 4, 2012 |
| The Hill | Safe R | November 4, 2012 |

==== Results ====
South Carolina's 5th congressional district, 2012
| Party | Candidate | Votes | % |
|---|---|---|---|
| Republican | Mick Mulvaney (incumbent) | 154,324 | 55.5 |
| Democratic | Joyce Knott | 123,443 | 44.4 |
| n/a | Write-ins | 236 | 0.1 |
| Total votes | | 278,003 | 100.0 |
| Republican hold | | | |

== District 6 ==
2012 South Carolina's 6th congressional district election
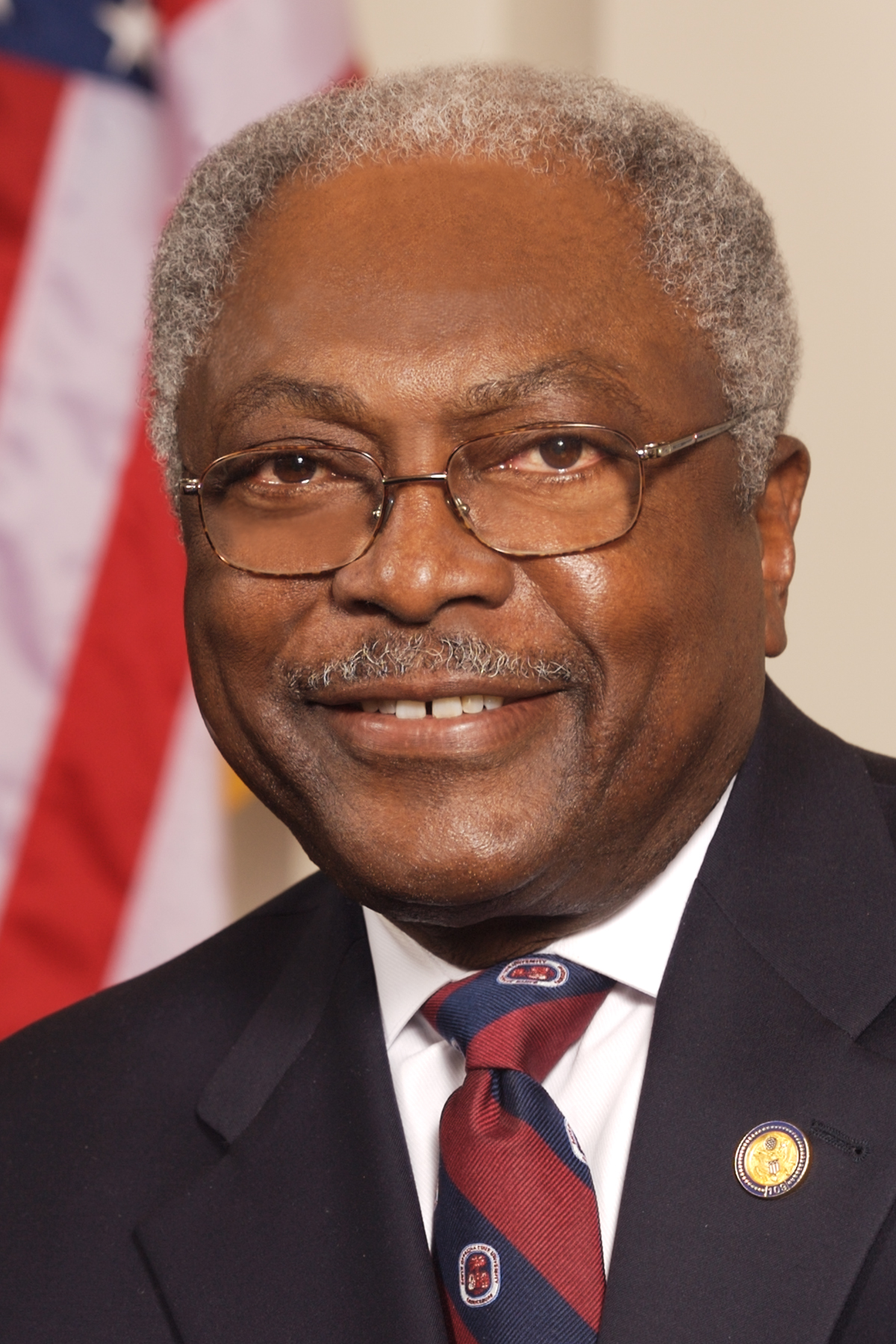

| Nominee | Jim Clyburn | Nammu Muhammad |
| Party | Democratic | Green |
| Popular vote | 218,717 | 12,920 |
| Percentage | 93.6% | 5.5% |
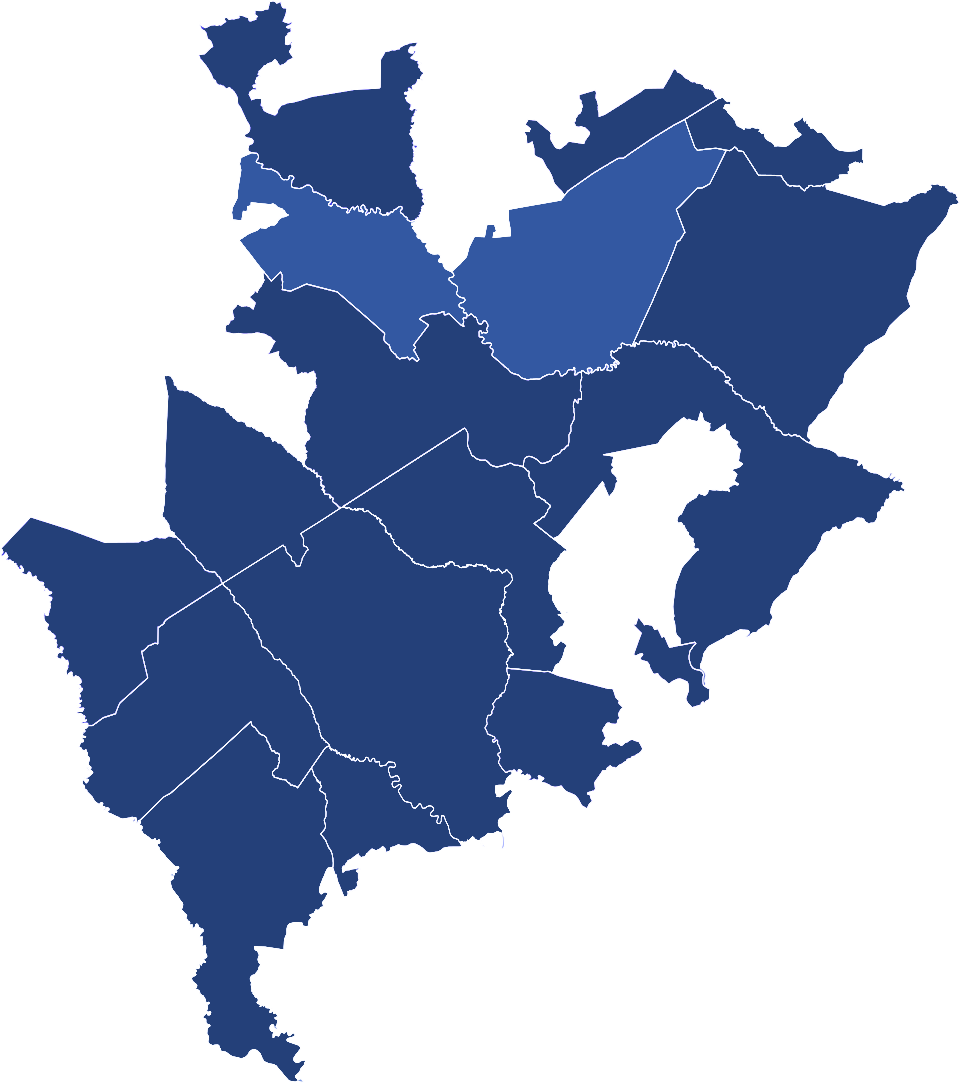
- County results Clyburn: 80-90% >90%
U.S. Representative before election
Jim Clyburn
Democratic
Elected U.S. Representative
Jim Clyburn
Democratic

The 6th district was expected to continue to strongly favor Democrats. Democrat Jim Clyburn, the Assistant Democratic Leader of the U.S. House who represented the 6th district since 1993, faced no Republican opposition, although Green Party candidate Nammu Muhammad still ran against Clyburn.

=== Democratic primary ===
==== Candidates ====
===== Nominee =====
- Jim Clyburn, incumbent U.S. Representative

=== General election ===
==== Endorsements ====
Jim Clyburn (D)

Labor unions

- National Association of Letter Carriers
- National Education Association
- United Steelworkers

Organizations

- Planned Parenthood Action Fund
- Sierra Club

==== Predictions ====
| Source | Ranking | As of |
|---|---|---|
| The Cook Political Report | Safe D | November 5, 2012 |
| Rothenberg | Safe D | November 2, 2012 |
| Roll Call | Safe D | November 4, 2012 |
| Sabato's Crystal Ball | Safe D | November 5, 2012 |
| NY Times | Safe D | November 4, 2012 |
| RCP | Safe D | November 4, 2012 |
| The Hill | Safe D | November 4, 2012 |

==== Results ====
South Carolina's 6th congressional district, 2012
| Party | Candidate | Votes | % |
|---|---|---|---|
| Democratic | Jim Clyburn (incumbent) | 218,717 | 93.6 |
| Green | Nammu Y. Muhammad | 12,920 | 5.5 |
| n/a | Write-ins | 1,978 | 0.9 |
| Total votes | | 233,615 | 100.0 |
| Democratic hold | | | |

== District 7 ==
2012 South Carolina's 7th congressional district election
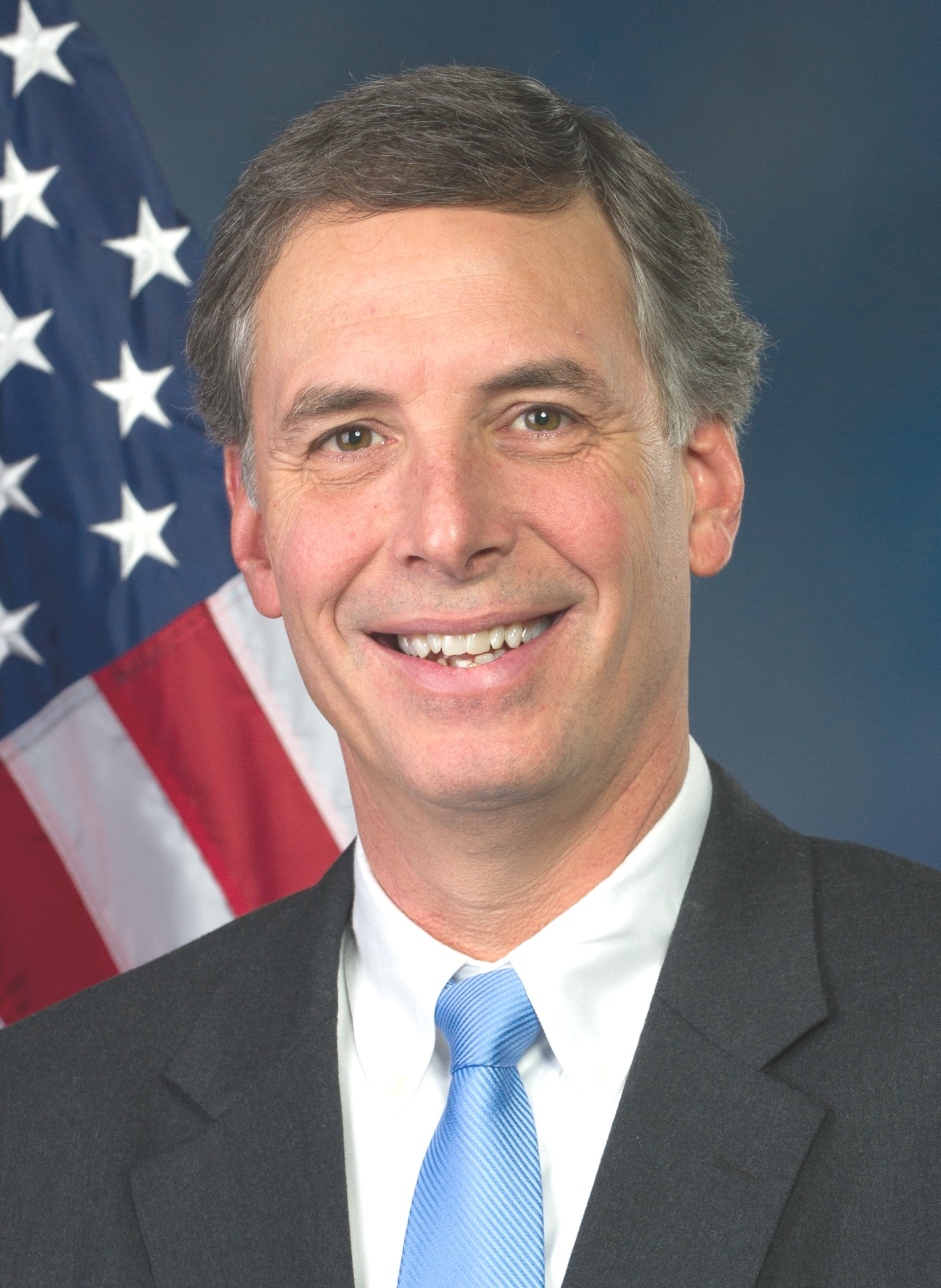

| Nominee | Tom Rice | Gloria Tinubu |
| Party | Republican | Democratic |
| Popular vote | 153,068 | 122,389 |
| Percentage | 55.5% | 44.4% |
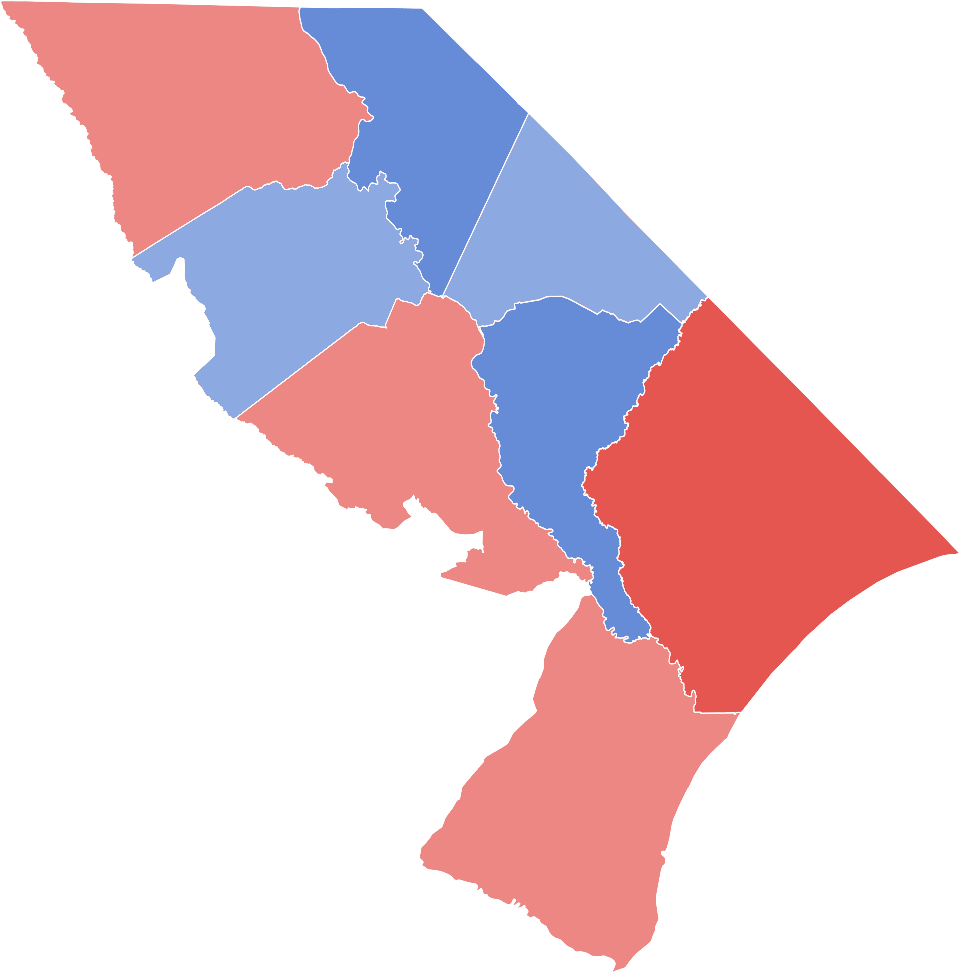
- County results Rice: 50-60% 60-70% Tinubu: 50-60% 60-70%
U.S. Representative before election
District established
Elected U.S. Representative
Tom Rice
Republican

The newly established 7th district contained most of the Pee Dee region, including the counties of Chesterfield, Darlington, Dillon, Georgetown, Horry, Marion, and Marlboro, along with a part of Florence County, and was expected to favor Republicans. Indeed, in 2013, the Cook Partisan Voting Index gave this district a rating of R+7.

=== Democratic primary ===
==== Candidates ====
===== Nominee =====
- Gloria Bromell Tinubu, professor at Coastal Carolina University and former member of the Georgia General Assembly

===== Eliminated in primary =====
- Preston Brittain, attorney
- Parnell Diggs, attorney and president of the National Federation of the Blind of South Carolina
- Harry Pavilack, attorney

===== Withdrawn =====
- Ted Vick, South Carolina House of Representatives' minority whip

==== Declined ====
- Stephen Wukela, mayor of Florence

==== Campaign ====
Ted Vick was considered to be the frontrunner until he was arrested in Columbia on the night of the May 14 on the Statehouse grounds and was charged with driving under the influence, speeding, and carrying a handgun without a permit. An officer had seen Vick stumbling as he walked into a parking garage, before getting into his car and hitting a cone before the officer could catch up. Vick smelled of alcohol but refused to take a breathalyzer test. Columbia Police Department officials indicated that Vick had been at a local bar prior to his arrest. A 21-year-old female USC student was in the car with Vick.

Vick would drop out of the race 10 days after his arrest.

==== Endorsements ====
Preston Brittain

Local officials

- Stephen Wukela, Mayor of Florence
Gloria Bromell Tinubu

Labor unions

- AFL-CIO
Ted Vick (withdrawn)

U.S. Representatives

- John Spratt, Representative for South Carolina's 5th congressional district (1983–2011)

State legislators

- Vincent Sheheen, state senator and nominee for Governor in 2010

Organizations

- Blue Dog Coalition

==== Polling ====
| Poll source | Date(s) administered | Sample size | Margin of error | Preston Brittain | Parnell Diggs | Harry Pavilack | Gloria Tinubu | Ted Vick | Undecided |
|---|---|---|---|---|---|---|---|---|---|
| Francis Marion University | May 14–15, 2012 | 611 | ±3.8% | 6% | 3% | 3% | 9% | 15% | 65% |

==== Primary results ====
Democratic primary results
| Party | Candidate | Votes | % |
|---|---|---|---|
| Democratic | Gloria Tinubu | 16,404 | 48.7 |
| Democratic | Preston Brittain | 12,347 | 36.7 |
| Democratic | Ted Vick | 2,375 | 7.0 |
| Democratic | Parnell Diggs | 1,408 | 4.2 |
| Democratic | Harry Pavilack | 1,132 | 3.4 |
| Total votes | | 33,666 | 100.0 |

==== Runoff results ====
Democratic primary results
| Party | Candidate | Votes | % |
|---|---|---|---|
| Democratic | Gloria Tinubu | 17,930 | 72.7 |
| Democratic | Preston Brittain | 6,733 | 27.3 |
| Total votes | | 24,663 | 100.0 |

=== Republican primary ===
==== Candidates ====
===== Nominee =====
- Tom Rice, chairman of the Horry County Council

===== Eliminated in primary =====
- André Bauer, former lieutenant governor and candidate for Governor in 2010
- Renée Culler, realtor
- Katherine Jenerette, Army veteran and candidate for South Carolina's 1st congressional district in 2010
- Jay Jordan, attorney
- Jim Mader, businessman
- Chad Prosser, former director of South Carolina Parks, Recreation and Tourism
- Randal Wallace, Myrtle Beach city council-member
- Dick Withington, businessman and Democratic candidate for South Carolina's 1st congressional district in 2010

==== Withdrew ====
- Thad Viers, state representative
- Debbie Harwell, public relations firm owner
- Mande Wilkes, attorney and local television host

==== Declined ====
- Alan Clemmons, state representative

==== Primary results ====
Republican primary results
| Party | Candidate | Votes | % |
|---|---|---|---|
| Republican | Andre Bauer | 12,037 | 32.1 |
| Republican | Tom Rice | 10,252 | 27.4 |
| Republican | Jay Jordan | 8,107 | 21.6 |
| Republican | Chad Prosser | 3,824 | 10.2 |
| Republican | Katherine Jenerette | 1,457 | 3.9 |
| Republican | Randal Wallace | 691 | 1.8 |
| Republican | Dick Withington | 641 | 1.7 |
| Republican | Renee Culler | 279 | 0.7 |
| Republican | Jim Mader | 180 | 0.5 |
| Total votes | | 37,468 | 100.0 |

==== Runoff results ====
Republican primary results
| Party | Candidate | Votes | % |
|---|---|---|---|
| Republican | Tom Rice | 16,844 | 56.1 |
| Republican | Andre Bauer | 13,173 | 43.9 |
| Total votes | | 30,017 | 100.0 |

=== General election ===
==== Endorsements ====
Gloria Tinubu (D)

Labor unions

- AFL-CIO
- United Steel Workers

Organizations

- National Organization for Women
- Working Families Party
Tom Rice (R)

Organizations

- NRA Political Victory Fund
- National Right to Life Committee
- United States Chamber of Commerce

==== Polling ====
| Poll source | Date(s) administered | Sample size | Margin of error | Gloria Tinubu (D) | Tom Rice (R) | Other | Undecided |
|---|---|---|---|---|---|---|---|
| Winthrop University | September 23–30, 2012 | 878 | ±3.5% | 36% | 49% | 2% | 13% |

==== Predictions ====
| Source | Ranking | As of |
|---|---|---|
| The Cook Political Report | Safe R (flip) | November 5, 2012 |
| Rothenberg | Safe R (flip) | November 2, 2012 |
| Roll Call | Safe R (flip) | November 4, 2012 |
| Sabato's Crystal Ball | Safe R (flip) | November 5, 2012 |
| NY Times | Safe R (flip) | November 4, 2012 |
| RCP | Safe R (flip) | November 4, 2012 |
| The Hill | Safe R (flip) | November 4, 2012 |

==== Results ====
South Carolina's 7th congressional district, 2012
| Party | Candidate | Votes | % |
|---|---|---|---|
| Republican | Tom Rice | 153,068 | 55.5 |
| Democratic | Gloria Bromell Tinubu | 122,389 | 44.4 |
| n/a | Write-ins | 281 | 0.1 |
| Total votes | | 275,738 | 100.0 |
| Republican win (new seat) | | | |
