= Shirley Franklin =

58th Mayor of Atlanta

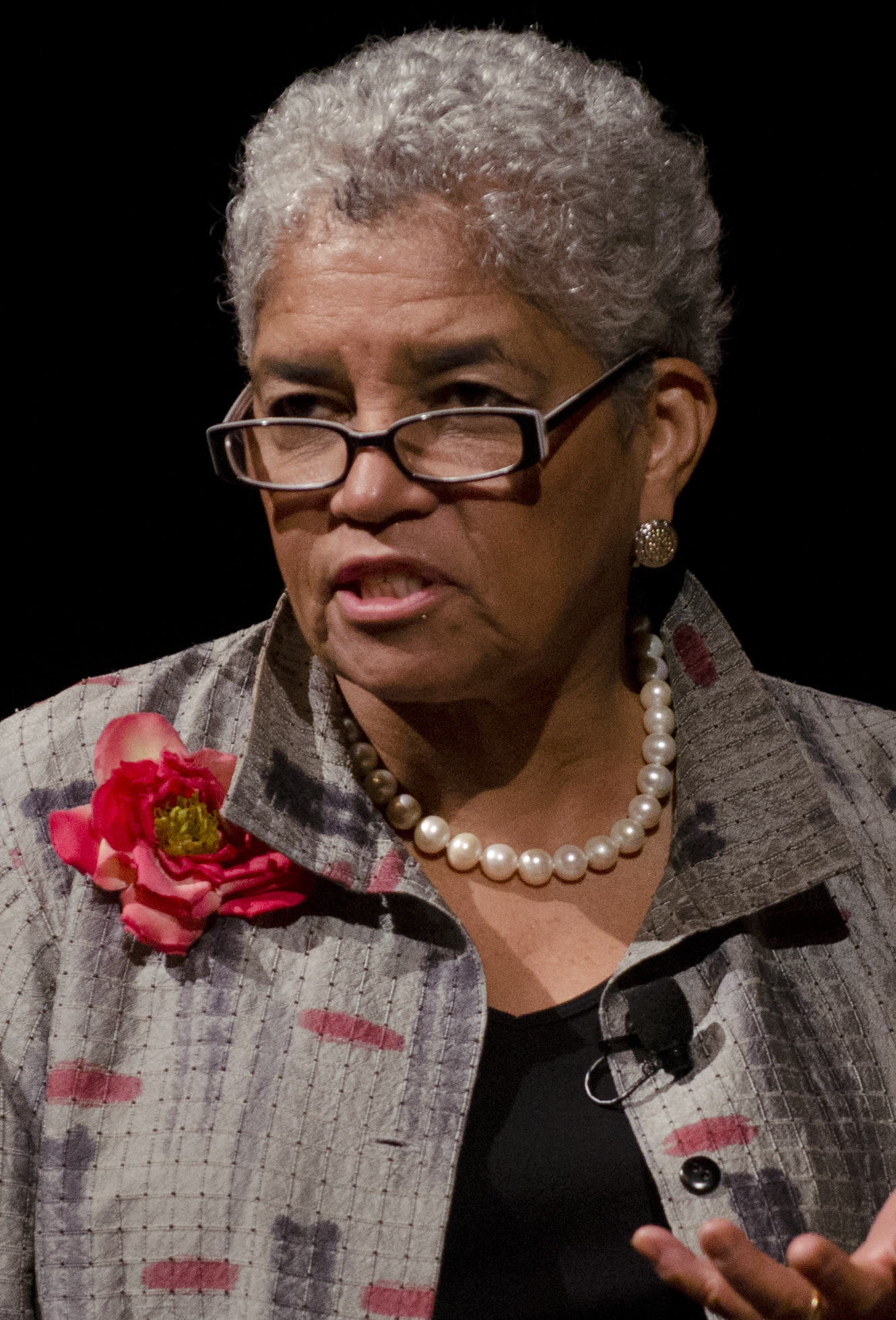
- Franklin in 2014

58th Mayor of Atlanta
- In office January 7, 2002 – January 3, 2010
- Preceded by: Bill Campbell
- Succeeded by: Kasim Reed

Personal details
- Born: Shirley Clarke Franklin; May 10, 1945 (age 81) Philadelphia, Pennsylvania, U.S.
- Party: Democratic
- Education: Howard University (BA); University of Pennsylvania (MA)

Shirley Clarke Franklin (born May 10, 1945) is an American politician, a member of the Democratic Party who served as the 58th mayor of Atlanta, Georgia, from 2002 to 2010. She has also served as a member on the board of directors for Delta Air Lines and Mueller Water Products.

The 58th mayor of Atlanta, she was the first woman to hold the post and the first black woman to be elected mayor of a major Southern city. Franklin was Atlanta's fourth African-American mayor. In July 2009, Mayor Franklin (along with Frances Townsend and Judge William H. Webster) was appointed to an ad hoc Department of Homeland Security special task force for 60-day review of the Homeland Security Advisory System.

== Education ==
Originally from Philadelphia, Pennsylvania, she is a graduate of the Philadelphia High School for Girls. Franklin received her B.A. in sociology from Howard University and her M.A., also in sociology, from the University of Pennsylvania. She is an Honorary member of Delta Sigma Theta sorority.

== Political career ==
Franklin served as the Commissioner of Cultural Affairs under Mayor Maynard Jackson. Subsequently, she was named Chief Administrative Officer and City Manager under Mayor Andrew Young.

Her 2001 run for mayor was her first run for public office. She won, succeeding Mayor Bill Campbell after winning 50 percent of the vote, defeating several candidates including Democrat Robb Pitts (33 percent). Facing a massive and unexpected budget deficit, Franklin slashed the number of government employees and increased taxes to balance the budget as quickly as possible.

Franklin made repairing the Atlanta sewer system a main focus of her office. Prior to Franklin's term, Atlanta's combined sewer system violated the federal Clean Water Act and burdened the city government with fines from the Environmental Protection Agency. In 2002, Franklin announced an initiative called "Clean Water Atlanta" to address the problem and begin improving the city's sewer system.

She has been lauded for efforts to make the City of Atlanta "green." Under Franklin's leadership Atlanta has gone from having one of the lowest percentages of LEED certified buildings to one of the highest.

In 2005, Time named Franklin one of the five best big-city American mayors. In October of that same year, she was included in the U.S. News & World Report "Best Leaders of 2005" issue.

With solid popular support and strong backing from the business sector, Franklin was reelected Atlanta Mayor in 2005, garnering more than 90 percent of the vote.

In February 2006, The White House Project named Shirley Franklin one of its "8 in '08", a group of eight female politicians who could possibly run and/or be elected president in 2008. She was the only person on the list to not be a governor, senator or presidential cabinet member, and one of two African-American women on the list; the other was United States Secretary of State Condoleezza Rice.

In 2006, Shirley Franklin led the effort to have the papers of Dr. Martin Luther King Jr. given to his alma mater, Morehouse College, instead of being sold at auction: "I never imagined I could contribute to the continuation of Dr. King's legacy in as a significant way. And I'm really humbled I was able to do anything to continue his legacy."

Franklin was a member of the Mayors Against Illegal Guns Coalition, an organization formed in 2006 and co-chaired by New York City mayor Michael Bloomberg and Boston mayor Thomas Menino. She was 2007/08 President of the National Conference of Democratic Mayors.

In 2008, facing a major deficit, Mayor Franklin asked the Atlanta City Council to approve a property tax increase, to avoid public safety cuts. The Atlanta City Council unanimously shot down the measure, which would have caused the average city homeowner to pay an estimated extra $30 in property taxes under Franklin's plan. As Mayor Franklin warned, without the tax increase, layoffs and pay cuts of Atlanta public safety officials would be imminent.

According to the Atlanta Journal-Constitution, in December 2008 Franklin announced that 222 city workers would lose their jobs to help fill a projected $50 million to $60 million budget shortfall. Most remaining city workers, including firefighters, will work fewer hours and suffer a pay cut as part of the budget cuts.

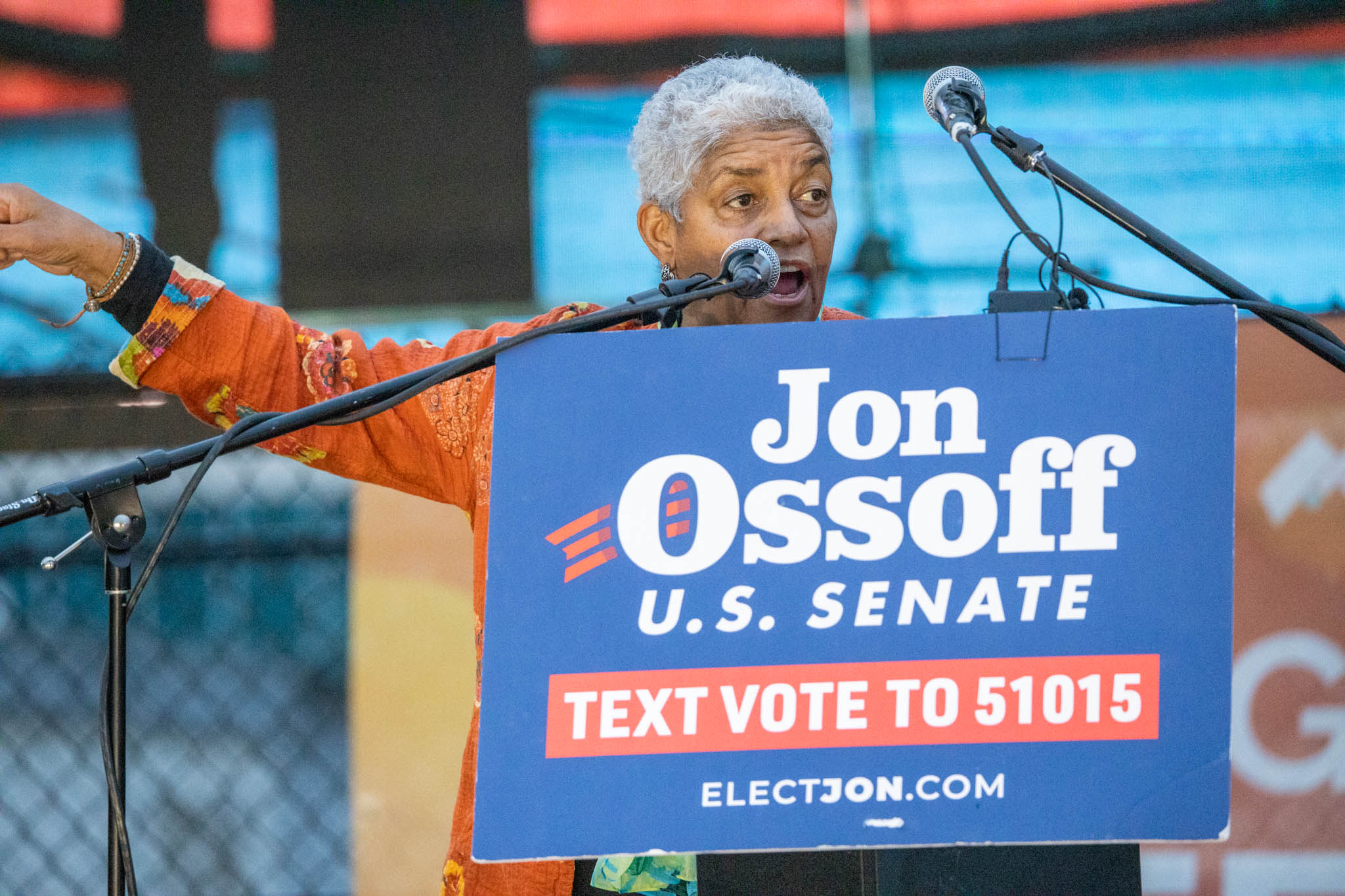
Franklin speaking at a rally for Jon Ossoff's Senate campaign in 2020

Franklin, along with Philadelphia's Michael Nutter and Phil Gordon of Phoenix, lobbied Treasury Secretary Henry Paulson in a joint letter asking for a share of the proposed $700 billion bailout.

== Honors ==
Mayor Franklin was the recipient of Profile in Courage Award in 2005, issued by the John F. Kennedy Library Foundation. The foundation praised her management of the city of Atlanta during the critical period of enormous deficit and loss of public confidence in government following the corrupt administration of Mayor Bill Campbell. In 2007, she received an honorary degree in Doctor of Humane Letters from Oglethorpe University.

In 2022, she was inducted as a Georgia Trustee, an honor given by the Georgia Historical Society in conjunction with the Governor of Georgia to individuals whose accomplishments and community service reflect the ideals of the founding body of Trustees, which governed the Georgia colony from 1732 to 1752.

In February 2025, a wing of the National Center for Civil and Human Rights was announced to have been named in her honor. Franklin had helped to get the center created when Mayor and continued to serve on its board. In March 2025, Central Avenue in downtown Atlanta was renamed Shirley Clarke Franklin Blvd and Westside Reservoir Park was renamed Shirley Clarke Franklin Park.

== Personal life ==
Franklin has a daughter, Kai Franklin Graham, whose former husband, Tremayne "Kiki" Graham, was sentenced to life in prison for his involvement in a drug dealing operation. Kai herself pled guilty to helping to launder money for him. Shirley Franklin had a son named Cabral who passed away in 2015.

According to a DNA analysis, Franklin says she is descended, mainly, from people of Guinea-Bissau and Sierra Leone.

== Electoral history ==
Atlanta mayoral general election, 2001
Party	Candidate	Votes	%
Nonpartisan	Shirley Franklin	40,715	50.17
Nonpartisan	Robert "Rob" L. Pitts	26,844	33.08
Nonpartisan	Gloria Bromell Tinubu	12,968	15.98

Atlanta mayoral general election, 2005
Party	Candidate	Votes	%
Nonpartisan	Shirley Franklin (incumbent)	42,642	90.49
Nonpartisan	Dave Walker	2,857	6.06
Nonpartisan	Glenn S. Wrightson	1,445	3.07
Nonpartisan	Write-in votes	179	0.38
Turnout		47,743	13.59

Political offices
Preceded by Bill Campbell	Mayor of Atlanta; 2002–2010	Succeeded by Kasim Reed
