= Carolyn Carlson =

Carolyn Carlson may refer to:

- Carolyn Carlson (artist) (born 1943), choreographer, dancer, and poet
- Carolyn Carlson (journalist) (born 1951), American professor of journalism at Kennesaw State University
