= Carolyn Carlson (journalist) =

Carolyn Carlson (born July 18, 1951) is an American professor of journalism at Kennesaw State University. She specializes in Freedom of Information studies. She was the second woman to serve as national president of the Society of Professional Journalists.

== Biography ==
Carlson graduated from the University of Georgia. She was a former political press secretary for Georgia Lieutenant Governor Pierre Howard and Marvin Arrington, Sr., former president of the Atlanta City Council. Carlson was also a longtime journalist and editor for the Associated Press, Augusta Chronicle and Orlando Sentinel.

She serves as an assistant professor of communication at Kennesaw State University, starting work there in August 2009. She will retire on July 31, 2018.

Carlson is a founding board member of the Georgia First Amendment Foundation and has been involved throughout her career in lobbying for public access to open records. In 1996, Carlson testified before a U.S. House of Representatives subcommittee to advocate for public campus crime logs, which are now required by federal law. In 2006 Carlson lobbied, successfully, for a Georgia law that required private colleges to make their crime incident reports public records, just as public colleges must. And in 2014, Carlson conducted a survey of political and general assignment reporters at all levels, finding that the vast majority said the amount of control public information officers exercise over the reporting process has been increasing over the previous several years.
