= Atlanta's 1st City Council district =

Atlanta, Georgia administrative district

Atlanta's 1st City Council district is one of the twelve geographic districts in the Atlanta City Council. It is currently represented by Jason Winston since 2022, after he defeated challenger Nathan Clubb in a 2021 runoff.

The district was created in 1973 after a new city charter was passed, which replaced the former at-large six-member Board of Aldermen with a 15-member City Council of 12 districts and 6 (later 3) at-large posts. A previous First Ward existed in various forms from 1854 to 1954.

== List of aldermen (1854-1954) ==
=== 1854 ===
The original boundaries for five wards were laid out in an unknown fashion and two councilmen from each ward were elected to coincide with the completion of the first official city hall in 1854. Third Ward councilmen of this period were:

- 1855: U. L. Wright and W. W. Baldwin
- 1859: T. G. Healey and Thomas Haney
- 1860: J. B. Norman and H. H. Glenn
- 1865: Benj. N. Williford, John Collier
- 1866: Anthony Murphy, Daniel P. Ferguson
- 1867: Richard Peters, Thomas M. Castleberry

=== 1935 ===
==== Aldermen ====
- Roscoe C. Ailor

==== Councilmembers ====
- Robert S. Dennis
- James E. Jackson

=== 1954 ===
- James E. "Jim" Jackson
- E. Gregory Griggs
- Robert Dennis (Position 1)

== List of councilors ==
- John H. Calhoun (January 7, 1974 – 1978)
- Debbie McCarty (1978–1993)
- Vern McCarty (1994–2002)
- Carla Smith (2002–2022)
- Jason Winston (2022–present)
