= Atlanta's 10th City Council district =

Atlanta's 10th City Council district is one of the twelve geographic districts in the Atlanta City Council. It is represented by Andrea Boone since 2018, who was elected in the 2017 Atlanta City Council election to succeed C. T. Martin.

The district was created in 1973 after a new city charter was passed, which replaced the former at-large six-member Board of Aldermen with a 15-member City Council of 12 districts and 6 (later 3) at-large posts.

== List of aldermen (1854–1974) ==
- G. Everett Millican

== List of councilmembers (1974–present) ==
- Ira Jackson (1974–1990)
- C. T. Martin (1990–2018)
- Andrea Boone (2018–present)
