= 2005 Atlanta mayoral election =

Mayoral election

- November 8, 2005
- Turnout: 13.59%
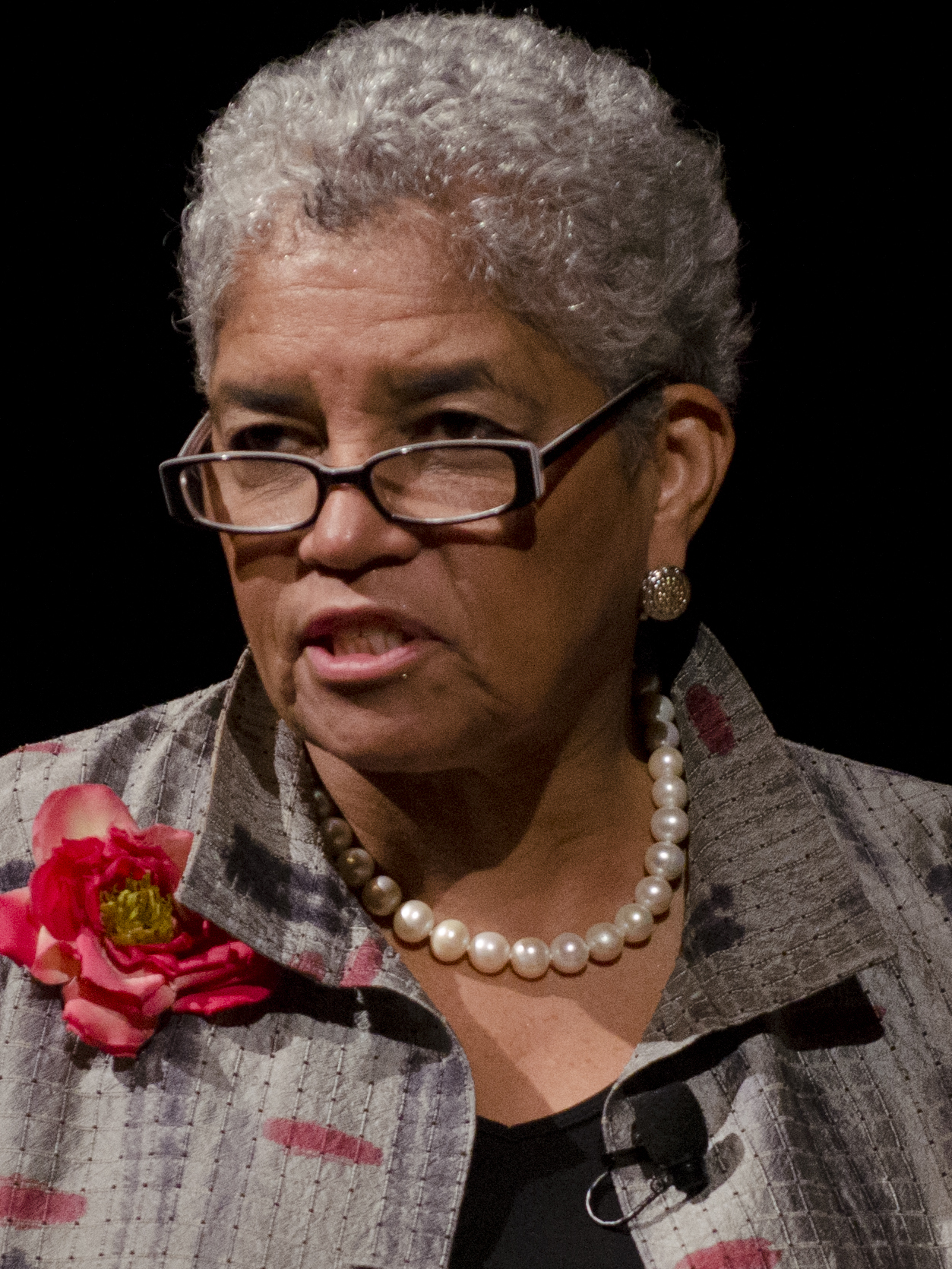

Candidate	Shirley Franklin	Dave Walker
Party	Nonpartisan	Nonpartisan
Popular vote	42,642	2,857
Percentage	90.49%	6.06%
Mayor before election
Shirley Franklin
Democratic
Elected mayor
Shirley Franklin
Democratic

The 2005 mayoral election in Atlanta, Georgia took place on November 8, 2005, alongside other Atlanta municipal races. Incumbent Mayor Shirley Franklin faced no serious opposition and was reelected with 90.49% of the vote.

== Results ==
Atlanta mayoral general election, 2005
Party	Candidate	Votes	%
nonpartisan candidate	Shirley Franklin (incumbent)	42,642	90.49
Nonpartisan	Dave Walker	2,857	6.06
Nonpartisan	Glenn S. Wrightson	1,445	3.07
Nonpartisan	Write-in votes	179	0.38
Turnout		47,743	13.59
