= 1997 Atlanta mayoral election =

- November 4, 1997 (general); November 25, 1997 (runoff)
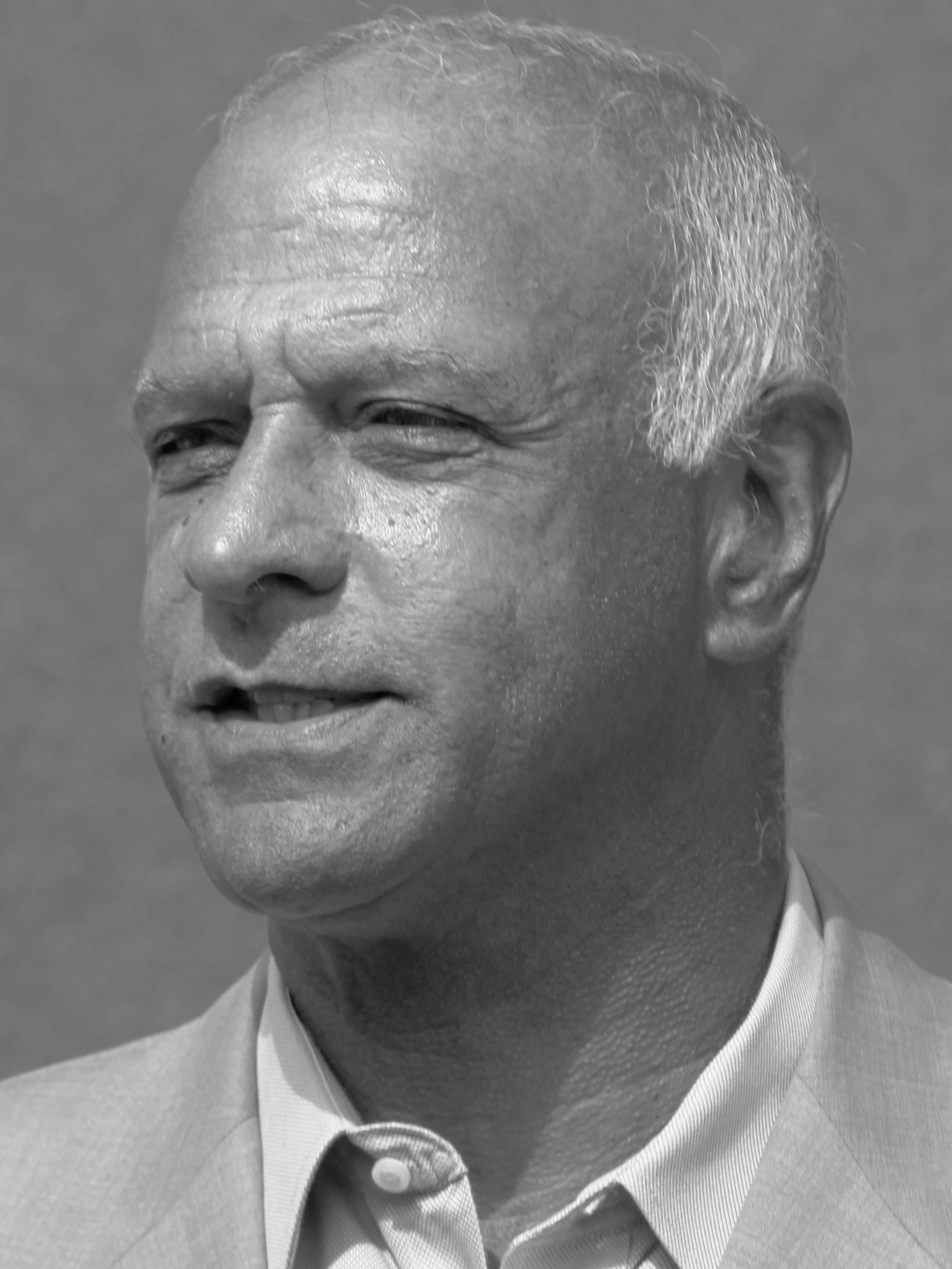

Candidate	Bill Campbell	Marvin S. Arrington Sr.	Gloria Bromell Tinubu
Party	Nonpartisan	Nonpartisan	Nonpartisan
First-round vote	32,251	25,424	9,679
First-round percentage	46.05%	36.30%	13.82%
Second-round vote	35,849	31,658
Second-round percentage	53.10%	46.90%
Mayor before election
Bill Campbell
Democratic
Elected mayor
Bill Campbell
Democratic

The 1997 Atlanta mayoral election occurred on November 4, 1997, with a runoff election held on November 25, 1997.

Since no candidate received a majority in the general election, a runoff election was held between the top-two finishers. Incumbent mayor Bill Campbell won reelection in the runoff.

== Candidates ==
Advanced to runoff

- Marvin S. Arrington Sr., Atlanta city councilor
- Bill Campbell, incumbent mayor

Eliminated in general election

- John Genins
- Louise T. Hornsby
- Jack Jersawitz
- Doug Nelson
- G.B. Osborne
- J. Alley Pat Patrick
- Gloria Bromell Tinubu, Atlanta city councilor

== Campaign ==
Ahead of the November 4 election, incumbent Campbell and challenger Arrington exchanged attacks, including personal attacks. Personal attacks between the candidates increased in the runoff. The race was regarded as one of the nastiest mayoral campaigns the city had seen in more than two decades.

The discourse of the runoff campaign, which was between two black candidates, took on racial tones. Former mayor Maynard Jackson, a supporter of Campbell, likened White Republicans, who largely supported Arrington in the election, to "Lester Maddox types", and argued that, if Arrington were elected, it would reverse civil rights progress that the city had made. Arrington denounced such remarks as race baiting. Days later, Arrington attacked Jackson, accusing him of not participating in the civil rights movement, and argued that he had instead been "in Cleveland, passing", which was widely interpreted as meaning that the light skinned Jackson was "passing" as White. Many saw Arrington's remarks as having brought to the surface the political dynamics related to Campbell being a light-skinned black candidate and Arrington being a dark skinned black candidate. After Arrington's remarks sparked outrage, Arrington argued that he had instead meant to say that, during the early days of the civil rights movement, Jackson, "was in Cleveland, passing out dictionaries and encyclopedias." In response to Arrington's remarks, Jackson called Arrington, "an old burned-out, do-nothing, lackluster politician with serious insecurities and hidden angers."

Campbell distributed materials by mail which argued that the, mayor's race "is now a civil rights issue", warning that, "if the ultraconservatives control City Hall we will lose the gains achieved during the last 25 years." Arrington criticized these mailers, arguing that they were code for saying that "White north Atlanta" would control City Hall if Arrington were elected.

Both candidates sought to win the black vote, seen as critical to either candidate's paths to victory in a city where black people comprised two-thirds of the populace.

Campbell's campaign spent roughly $3 million, which was roughly twice what Arrington's campaign spent.

Other campaign issues included crime and the safety of the city's water system.

Turnout for the runoff was considered low.

== Results ==
=== General election (November 4) ===
Atlanta mayoral general election, 1997
Party	Candidate	Votes	%
Nonpartisan	Bill Campbell (incumbent)	32,251	46.05
Nonpartisan	Marvin S. Arrington Sr.	25,424	36.30
Nonpartisan	Gloria Bromell Tinubu	9,679	13.82
Nonpartisan	Louise T. Hornsby	1,690	2.41
Nonpartisan	J. Alley Pat Patrick	325	0.46
Nonpartisan	Jack Jersawitz	250	0.36
Nonpartisan	John Genins	198	0.28
Nonpartisan	G.B. Osborne	132	0.19
Nonpartisan	Doug Nelson	83	0.12
Total votes		70,032	100

=== Runoff (November 25) ===
Atlanta mayoral runoff election, 1997
Party	Candidate	Votes	%
Nonpartisan	Bill Campbell (incumbent)	35,849	53.10
Nonpartisan	Marvin S. Arrington Sr.	31,658	46.90
Total votes		67,507	100
