= Ted Vick =

American politician (born 1972)

Ted Martin Vick

Member of the South Carolina House of Representatives from the 53rd district
- In office January 3, 2005 – November 2014
- Preceded by: Mary Beth Freeman
- Succeeded by: Richie Yow

Personal details
- Born: November 14, 1972 (age 54)
- Party: Democratic
- Spouse: Melissa
- Education: The Citadel (BS); University of South Carolina
- Profession: Businessman

Ted Vick (born November 14, 1972) is an American politician and a member of the Democratic Party. He served in the South Carolina House of Representatives from 2005 to 2014.

== Early life, education, and early career ==
Vick was born in 1972 in Cheraw, South Carolina to Julian Ted and Jan Sellers Vick. He got a B.S. from The Citadel, The Military College of South Carolina in 1995 and a master's from the University of South Carolina in 1997. Since 1990, he has been a Major in the South Carolina National Guard.

Vick is a member of the American Legion Post 74, Lower Macedonia Baptist Church, Phi Kappa Phi society, and Sandhills Citadel Club. In recent years, he has owned a few companies such as V&B Properties, MTV Properties, and Ted Vick Motor Company.

== South Carolina House of Representatives ==
=== Elections ===
In 2004, Vick ran for the South Carolina House of Representatives in the Chesterfield County based-53rd House District. James Sweeney and Vick both qualified for the run-off election as no candidate got 50% of the vote in the Democratic primary. Sweeney got 36% and Vick got 35%. Vick defeated Sweeney in the run-off 54%-46%. He won the general election unopposed. He won re-election in 2006, 2008, and 2010 without any opposition.

=== Tenure ===
In 2005, he was named Legislator of the Year by CIADA. Between 2006 and 2008, he was the Democratic House Whip. He is the Chairman of South Carolina Legislative Sportsmen's Caucus. He has called himself a "pro-life Baptist" who also supports gun rights. After U.S. Congresswoman Gabby Giffords was shot in January 2011, he sponsored an unsuccessful bill that would have allowed state lawmakers with concealed weapons permits to carry a handgun inside of the Statehouse.

After 8 years as a member of the American Legislative Exchange Council (ALEC), Vick resigned from the organization.

=== Committee assignments ===
- Agriculture, Natural Resources and Environmental Affairs (Secretary)
- Interstate Cooperation (Chairman)
  - Subcommittee on Wildlife (Chairman)

== 2012 congressional election ==
In November 2011, he announced he would run in the newly created South Carolina's 7th congressional district. The Blue Dog Coalition endorsed him.

=== Arrest ===
Vick was arrested May 14, 2012 after a state Bureau of Protective Services officer saw him stumbling in the State House parking garage before getting into his truck and running into a traffic cone.

That case was delayed in October after a judge ruled attorneys from the state Department of Public Safety had no authority to prosecute the case. Public Safety plans to appeal the ruling.

About 11 pm on the night of May 14, 2012, Vick was arrested in Columbia, SC by the Bureau of Protective Services on the Statehouse grounds and was charged with driving under the influence (DUI), speeding, and carrying a handgun without a permit. An officer saw Vick stumbling as he walked into a parking garage located in the Statehouse grounds in Columbia. Vick got into his car and hit a cone before the officer could catch up and ask him to stop. Vick smelled of alcohol but refused to take a breathalyzer test. Columbia Police Department officials indicated that Vick had been at a local bar prior to his arrest. A 21-year-old female USC student was in the car with Vick.

On May 16, Vick's attorney J. Todd Rutherford, who is also a state representative said that Vick had a pebble in his shoe and that is why he was walking funny. Vicks attorney went on to say that there are too many inconsistencies in the officer statement in regards to how the parking garage was laid out and to what the officer said what happened and also that the cone Vick is accused of hitting "Has a lot of black marks on it because people hit it all the time." Rutherford says that he can produce several people who can testify that Vick was perfectly sober when he left the restaurant.

The charges were eventually dropped.

=== Aftermath ===
Vick dropped out of the race after his arrest. However his name still appeared on the June Democratic ballot. Gloria Bromell Tinubu ended up winning the nomination, but lost the November general election to Republican Tom Rice.

== Personal life ==
Vick lives in the City of Chesterfield, South Carolina with his wife Melissa and their twin daughters Willow and Laurel.
