= Jack Jersawitz =

American leftist activist, mayoral candidate, and television host (1934-2012)

- Born: August 13, 1934; Brooklyn, New York, U.S.
- Died: December 6, 2012 (aged 78); Atlanta, Georgia, U.S.
- Presenting career
- Show: Brainstorms; Telling it Like it is
- Network: People TV
- Style: Public-access

Jack Jersawitz (August 13, 1934 – December 6, 2012) was an American television host, mayoral candidate, and Marxist activist. He was well known for hosting a public-access TV show called Brainstorms, a current events talk show on People TV, containing live telephone call-in segments that were frequently subject to prank calls.

== Personal life ==
Jack Jersawitz was born on August 13, 1934, in Brooklyn, New York. He lived on the west coast of the United States and in London, England, before settling in Atlanta, Georgia in the early 1970s. He earned his high school equivalency degree in 1997 and briefly studied the origins of jazz and film analysis at Georgia State University through a program that offered free classes to senior citizens. He worked as a printer, handyman, and mechanic before he retired.

== People TV ==
Jersawitz hosted two public-access political talk shows on People TV: Brainstorms and Telling it Like it is. The former featured the ability for viewers to phone-in live, and as a result, it was often the target of prank callers.

=== Lawsuits against the studio ===
In December 1995, People TV's facility temporarily shut down for renovations, despite Jersawitz's objections. He made the studio's board of directors aware that he would be monitoring their meetings and records due to his suspicion that the renovation budget was inflated to potentially provide kickbacks. In October 1996, a meeting between the board and the producers was ended when Jersawitz refused to stop recording with a personal camera, claiming it was a public meeting in a public facility. (Note: Footage uploaded to Jersawitz’s YouTube channel) He filed a lawsuit afterwards, in which the Fulton County Superior Court determined that People TV's meetings were not subject to Georgia's Sunshine Laws. During this time, he repeatedly harassed several studio employees via letters, telephone calls, and fax messages.

In January 1997, upon arriving at the facility, Jersawitz was ordered to cease his harassment and informed he was no longer welcome on the property. He refused to leave and was arrested for criminal trespassing. The following month, Jersawitz filed a lawsuit against People TV and the City of Atlanta, alleging that his First Amendment rights were violated when he was barred from accessing the studio's facilities and equipment. Ultimately, the court ruled in favor of People TV.

== Activism ==
Jersawitz was a radical communist as well as an abrasive critic, who frequently expressed harsh critiques of things he disagreed with. His oft-used verbal tactic in public meetings, consisting of slowly building up his aggressiveness from snide comments to full insults was dubbed a "Jack Attack". He claimed to have been visited multiple times by the United States Secret Service for expressing a desire that the President of the United States be tried and hanged, but turned them away in each instance, as they failed to produce proper warrants.

He unsuccessfully ran for mayor in Atlanta, Georgia, in both 1997 and 2001. During his first campaign, his most important issue was the creation of a Labor Party for the working class. In his second campaign, he proposed getting rid of property taxes for city homeowners making less than $100,000, suggested the Police Department be dissolved, and vowed to fire any city official who did not comply with an Open Records Act request.

Jersawitz stated in 2001 that he picked the side of "the poor, the oppressed, the working class and those who never got a chance to be part of the working class". He won several important lawsuits related to civil liberties, such as Jersawitz v. Fortson in 1994, which he filed after being denied access to a meeting for a special Olympics task force that had been created to carry out the work of the Atlanta Housing Authority Board of Commissioners with respect to the selection of certain proposals.

== Death ==
Jersawitz died on December 6, 2012, in Atlanta, Georgia after battling several illnesses, including esophageal cancer and chronic obstructive pulmonary disease.
