= 1985 Atlanta mayoral election =

- October 8, 1985
- Turnout: 32.89%
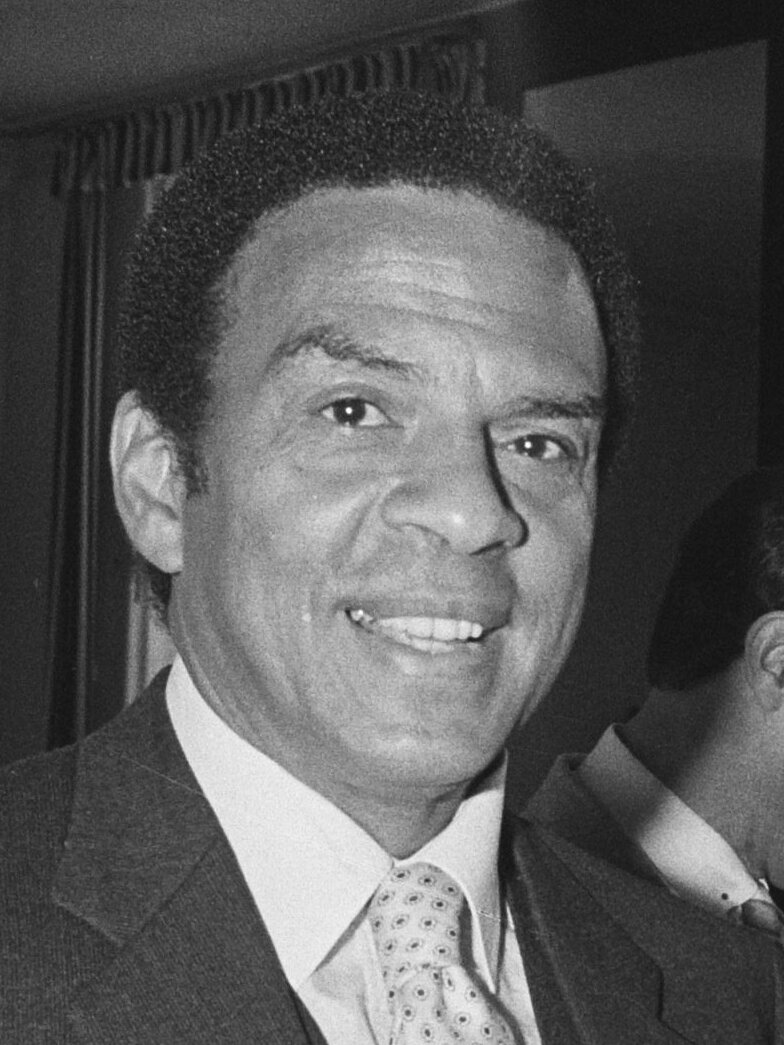

Candidate	Andrew Young	J.K. Ramey	Marvin Yizar
Party	Nonpartisan	Nonpartisan	Nonpartisan
Popular vote	47,745	7,026	3,856
Percentage	81.43%	11.98%	6.57%
Mayor before election
Andrew Young
Democratic
Elected mayor
Andrew Young
Democratic

The 1985 Atlanta mayoral election took place on October 8, 1985. Incumbent Mayor Andrew Young easily won a second term against token opposition.

== Candidates ==
- J.K. Ramey, tire store owner
- Marvin Yizar, private investigator and Methodist minister
- Andrew Young, incumbent Mayor

== Campaign ==
During Young's first term, he was credited with uniting his natural constituency of black voters and the Atlanta white business establishment. Accomplishments touted by Mayor Young included bringing new businesses to Atlanta and a plan to revive Underground Atlanta. Points of contention discussed by opponents included approval of the Presidential Parkway and his overseas traveling to promote Atlanta. Nevertheless, economic prosperity and personal popularity for Mayor Young resulted in no major opponents stepping forward. The lack of credible opposition resulted in low turnout for the election.

== Results ==
Candidate	Votes	%
Andrew Young (inc.)	47,745	81.4
J.K. Ramey	7,026	11.9
Marvin Yizar	3,856	6.5
Total	58,627	100.0
Blank/Over Votes	6,832	–
Total ballots	65,459	
Registered voters	199,018	32.8
Source: Fulton County Board of Elections{dead link}
