= 2001 Atlanta mayoral election =

- November 6, 2001
- Turnout: 40.68%
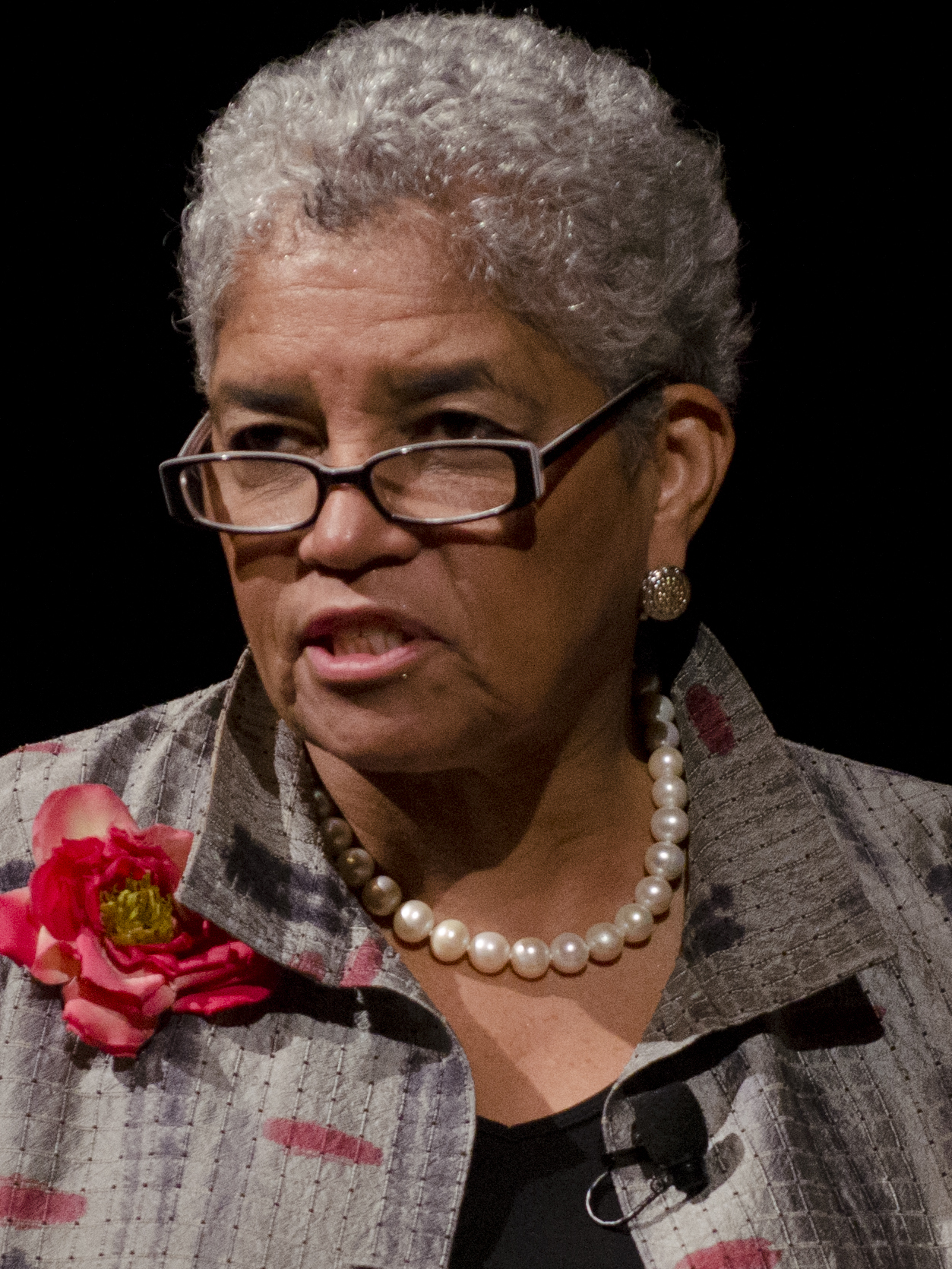

Candidate	Shirley Franklin	Robb Pitts	Gloria Bromell Tinubu
Party	Nonpartisan	Nonpartisan	Nonpartisan
Popular vote	40,715	26,844	12,968
Percentage	50.17%	33.08%	15.98%
Mayor before election
Bill Campbell
Democratic
Elected mayor
Shirley Franklin
Democratic

The 2001 Atlanta mayoral election occurred on November 6, 2001. Incumbent mayor Bill Campbell, a member of the Democratic Party who had been in office since 1994, was ineligible to run for reelection due to term limits.

Since Franklin received a majority in the general election, no runoff election was held.

== Results ==
Atlanta mayoral general election, 2001
Party	Candidate	Votes	%
Nonpartisan	Shirley Franklin	40,715	50.17
Nonpartisan	Robert "Rob" L. Pitts	26,844	33.08
Nonpartisan	Gloria Bromell Tinubu	12,968	15.98
Nonpartisan	Trudy Jane Kitchin	294	0.36
Nonpartisan	G. B. Osborne	225	0.28
Turnout		81,146	40.68
