= John H. Calhoun =

American politician (1899–1988)

John H. Calhoun Jr.

Member of the Atlanta City Council District 1
- In office January 7, 1974 – 1978
- Succeeded by: Debbie McCarty

Personal details
- Born: John Henry Calhoun Jr. July 8, 1899 Greenville, South Carolina, U.S.
- Died: May 6, 1988 (aged 88) Atlanta, Georgia, U.S.
- Party: Republican
- Education: Morehouse College (1937); Atlanta University (1968)
- Occupation: Activist, civil rights leader, politician

John H. Calhoun Jr. (July 8, 1899 – May 6, 1988) was an American civil rights leader and politician who served on the Atlanta City Council representing District 1 from 1974 to 1978.

== Early life and education ==
John Henry Calhoun Jr. was born on July 8, 1899, in Greenville, South Carolina. At the age of 12, he started apprenticing as a blacksmith; Calhoun graduated high school from the Hampton Institute in 1922, at the age of 23. Calhoun also earned a Bachelor of Arts from Morehouse College in 1937, and graduated from Atlanta University in 1968 with an MBA. He also attended Northwestern University.

== Political Work ==
Calhoun worked at the Veteran's Affairs hospital in Tuskeegee starting on July 3, 1923, where he immediately received threats from the Ku Klux Klan.

Calhoun moved to Atlanta in 1934. In 1940, he co-founded the Atlanta Negro Voters League. Calhoun became president of the Atlanta chapter of the NAACP in 1956. Throughout Atlanta, Calhoun was known as "Your Man in Community Action". In 1964, he was recommended by Robert Snodgrass to attend the 1964 Republican National Convention on behalf of state moderate Republicans who felt alienated by the nomination of Barry Goldwater.

Calhoun was a member of the Atlanta City Council for District 1 from 1974 to 1978. Calhoun was a Republican. In the October 1973 election, Calhoun defeated John Releford with 75% of the vote. Mayor Maynard Jackson presented Calhoun with an award in May 1981.

== Personal life ==
Outside of politics and activism, Calhoun held a large variety of jobs, working as a bookkeeper, dock worker, janitor, headwaiter, hospital administrator, insurance salesman, real estate agent, and reporter. Businesses he founded included Calhoun Furniture Company and John Calhoun Real Estate.

Calhoun had two children, John Henry Calhoun III and Ninaking Anderson.

John Calhoun Park on Auburn Avenue in Atlanta is named in his honor. Calhoun's papers are housed at the Robert W. Woodruff Library, Atlanta University Center, which include a draft of Calhoun's unpublished book Atlanta — The Cradle of Black Leadership in America.

Calhoun died on May 6, 1988, in Atlanta.
