= 1977 Atlanta mayoral election =

Mayoral elections in Atlanta

- October 4, 1977

Candidate	Maynard Jackson	Harold Dye	Milton Farris
Party	Nonpartisan	Nonpartisan	Nonpartisan
Popular vote	54,375	15,295	12,265
Percentage	63.52%	17.7%	14.15%
Mayor of Atlanta before election
Maynard Jackson
Democratic
Elected Mayor of Atlanta
Maynard Jackson
Democratic

The 1977 Atlanta mayoral election took place on October 4, 1977. Incumbent Mayor Maynard Jackson easily won a second term without the need for a runoff.

== Results ==
Candidate	Votes	%
Maynard Jackson (incumbent)	54,375	63.2
Harold Dye	15,295	17.7
Milton Farris	12,265	14.3
Emma Darnell	3,560	4.2
Vince Eagan	495	0.6
Total votes	85,590	100
Invalid/blank votes	4,379	–
Total ballots	89,969	
Registered voters/turnout	202,697	44.3
Source: Fulton County BOE
