= Carl Ware =

American businessman (born 1943)

- Born: 1943 (age 82–83); Newnan, Georgia, U.S.
- Education: Clark College (BA); University of Pittsburgh (MPA)
- Occupation: Businessman
- Employer: The Coca-Cola Company (retired)
- Known for: Former Executive Vice President of The Coca-Cola Company
- Office: President of the Atlanta City Council
- Board member of: Chevron Corporation; Council on Foreign Relations; Georgia Power

President of the Atlanta City Council
- In office 1976–1980
- Preceded by: Wyche Fowler
- Succeeded by: Marvin S. Arrington Sr.

Member of the Atlanta City Council District 11
- In office January 7, 1974 – 1976
- Preceded by: Position established
- Succeeded by: Jim Maddox

Carl Ware (born 1943) is an American businessman who served as executive vice-president of the Coca-Cola Company from 2001 to 2003.

== Biography ==
=== Early life ===
Ware was born in Newnan, Georgia.

He holds a bachelor's degree in political science from Clark College and a master's degree in public administration from the Graduate School of Public and International Affairs at the University of Pittsburgh and is a 1991 graduate of the Harvard Business School's International Senior Management Program.

=== Career ===
He was elected to the City Council of Atlanta, Georgia, in 1973 and served as president of the council from 1976 until 1979.

In 1979, he was named Vice President of Special Markets for Coca-Cola USA, with responsibility for expanding African-American and Hispanic marketing and advertising programs. In 1982, Ware was promoted to Vice President of Urban Affairs. In 1986, he was elected Senior Vice President of Coca-Cola. Ware was named Deputy Group President, Northeast Europe and Africa, in 1991, and was appointed president of the Africa Group in 1993.

He was elected a director of Chevron Corporation in 2001. He is a former senior adviser to the chief executive officer of the Coca-Cola Company, a position he held from 2003 to 2006. He also sits on the board of directors of the Council on Foreign Relations and Georgia Power.

== Relevant literature ==
- Ware, Carl with Sibley Fleming. 2019. Portrait of an American Businessman. Macon, Georgia: Mercer University Press.
