= Gloria Bromell Tinubu =

American politician, educator, economist

Member of the Georgia House of Representatives from the 60th district
- In office January 2011 – January 2013
- Preceded by: Georganna Sinkfield
- Succeeded by: Keisha Waites

Personal details
- Born: February 22, 1953 (age 73) Murrells Inlet, South Carolina, U.S.
- Party: Democratic
- Education: Howard University (B.F.A.); Clemson University (M.S., Ph.D.)
- Profession: Economist; Politician

Gloria Bromell Tinubu (born February 22, 1953) is an applied economist, educator, and political figure. She served on the Atlanta City Council and as a member of the Georgia State Assembly, as well as running as a candidate for mayor of Atlanta, along with Congress in neighboring South Carolina.

== Early life and education ==
Gloria Bromell Tinubu was born in Brookgreen Gardens, Georgetown County, South Carolina near Murrells Inlet, South Carolina. She is the seventh of eight children born to Beatrice and Charlie Bromell, who were determined that their children would receive the high school education they never had. When she was four, her family moved to her parents' hometown, Plantersville, located in Georgetown County, South Carolina. She graduated from Choppee High School in 1971. She was salutatorian and president of her graduating class. The first in her family to go to college, she attended the University of South Carolina in Columbia for her freshman year as a Herbert Lehman Scholar. She transferred to Howard University, where she earned a bachelor's degree in Fine Arts with honors in 1974.

== Personal life ==
In 1976, she married Soji Tinubu, a Nigerian-born U.S. citizen who has a master's degree in civil engineering from Clemson University. They have four children and six grandchildren.

== Academia ==
Bromell decided on graduate studies, becoming the first African-American woman to earn an MS in Agricultural Economics (December 1977) from Clemson University. Her master's thesis addressed the problems associated with clouded title property, known as "heirs property". Her study was the first scientific documentation and measurement of the problem in South Carolina. Her findings were published in Progressive Farmer Magazine (1978), carried by many local newspapers throughout the State, presented at the American Agricultural Economics Association's annual meeting, and submitted to the South Carolina Legislature. State Rep. Herbert Fielding submitted a bill to correct problems identified by Bromell Tinubu.

Bromell Tinubu continued with graduate work at Clemson, in August 1986 becoming their first African American student to earn a Ph.D. in Applied Economics. Her Ph.D. dissertation studied the financial stability of South Carolina's public water systems.

She had started her college academic career as an assistant professor of economics in 1986 at Spelman College (Atlanta, Georgia); she became chair of the economics department and earned tenure as associate professor in 1992. Since her move to South Carolina, Bromell Tinubu has worked as a teaching associate in the College of Business Administration at Coastal Carolina University in Conway.

From 2001 to 2004, she was founder and CEO of Atlanta Cooperative Development Corporation, a community economic development corporation for the development of cooperative entities such as credit unions, cooperative housing and businesses. From 2004 to 2006, Bromell Tinubu she served as the president of Barber–Scotia College, a historically black college in North Carolina.

== Political career ==
Entering politics in Georgia, Bromell Tinubu was elected in 1993 to a four-year term on the Atlanta City Council representing Council District 12. She was appointed to the Georgia Board of Education by Governor Roy Barnes in 2000. She was later elected as a Democrat to the Georgia General Assembly (HD-60 Georgia General Assembly), where she served on its committees for intra-governmental relations, interstate cooperation, and small business/job creation. Previously she was a candidate for Atlanta mayor in 1997 and 2001.

In the 2016 cycle, Bromell Tinubu was an "early endorser" of Bernie Sanders's presidential bid, who had previously fundraised and campaigned for her in her 2014 bid. She was part of the Women for Bernie discussion led by former Ohio State Senator Nina Turner, and she served as chair for SC Women for Bernie.

In February 2019, during the 2020 cycle, Bromell Tinubu endorsed Marianne Williamson and announced that she would be working as her national senior advisor and South Carolina state director. In late April 2019, Bromell Tinubu stated she was no longer working for the campaign after announcing her 2020 Senate bid against Senator Lindsey Graham, prompting the search for a replacement.

In 2021, she co-authored The Georgia Way: How to Win Elections with Ray McClendon, Steven Rosenfeld, and Mike Hersh.

=== 2012 congressional campaign ===
Having joined the Democratic Party in South Carolina, in 2012 Bromell Tinubu ran for the Democratic nomination in the newly created 7th congressional district.

Having returned to South Carolina, she entered state politics. In 2012, she ran as a Democrat for Congress in South Carolina's newly established 7th congressional district against state representative Ted Vick and Myrtle Beach attorney Preston Brittain. Vick dropped out of the race prior to the primary. She had won the Democratic primary for the district seat with 73% of the votes. She is the first African-American woman in South Carolina to win her party's nomination for Congress.

The South Carolina Election Commission declared Bromell Tinubu as the primary winner, but a judge ruled that the votes cast for Vick had to be counted. That dropped her percentage of the vote total below the 50 percent threshold needed to win the primary. Two weeks later, she beat Brittain in a primary runoff with 73 percent of the vote. Brittain had the endorsement of key Democratic leaders, including U.S. Rep. Jim Clyburn and former governor Jim Hodges.

Bromell Tinubu lost the election to Republican Tom Rice; he carried 56 percent of the votes to her 44 percent. In 2025, a journalist noted that this race was "the closest a Democrat has gotten to winning the 7th District since South Carolina gained it back following the 2010 census".

=== 2014 congressional campaign ===
In 2014, she ran against Rice again, but she lost by bigger margins than in 2012. Rice won with 60% or 102,576 votes; Bromell Tinubu had 40% and 68,412 votes.

=== 2018 Gubernatorial Race ===
In 2018, Tinubu was selected by Democratic gubernatorial candidate Phil Noble to be his lieutenant governor running mate. James Smith ultimately won the Democratic nomination

=== 2020 United States Senate Race ===
In May 2019, Tinubu announced a run for United States Senate, challenging Republican incumbent Lindsey Graham. She campaigned on the theme, 'Reshaping America: Economic Justice Tour'. Tinubu joined Democrat Jaime Harrison in competing for the nomination. In January 2020, Tinubu dropped out of the race, endorsing Harrison.
