= Deborah McCarty =

American politician

Member of the Atlanta City Council District 1
- In office 1978–1994
- Preceded by: John H. Calhoun
- Succeeded by: Vern McCarty

President of the Columbia Association
- In office August 20, 1998 – May 2000
- Preceded by: Padraic M. Kennedy
- Succeeded by: Charles D. Rhodehamel

Personal details
- Born: Deborah Ownby; 1952 or 1953 (age 73–74)
- Education: Southwestern University, 1973 (BA)

Deborah Ownby McCarty (sometimes Debbie or Debby) is an American lawyer and politician. She was a member of the Atlanta City Council, the head of Atlanta's Department of Parks, Recreation and Cultural Affairs, and the president of the Columbia Association.

McCarty grew up in Houston, Texas and earned her bachelor's degree in 1973 at Southwestern University in Georgetown. She moved to Atlanta to study for a master's in theology from Emory University, but she instead left and joined Volunteers in Service to America in 1975.

McCarty, who is white, ran in 1977 for District 1 of the Atlanta City Council, which was then 85% Black. Her opponent in the race, John H. Calhoun, urged voters not to vote for "that white woman". McCarty won with 67% of the vote on a budget of $5,000. She held the seat through the 80s.

Southwestern University awarded McCarty with an honorary L.H.D. degree in 1990.

McCarty earned a Juris Doctor degree at Georgia State University in 1992. The same year, she was the co-chair of the Georgia primary campaign for Bill Clinton's run for president.

In 1993, mayor Maynard Jackson appointed McCarty as head of the Atlanta Department of Parks, Recreation and Cultural Affairs. She unsuccessfully ran for president of the Atlanta City Council in 1997, earning an endorsement from Southern Voice; she lost the race to Robb Pitts.

She became president of the Columbia Association, one of the largest homeowner associations in the nation, on August 20, 1998, succeeding Padraic Kennedy after his retirement. After missteps and pressure, she resigned in May 2000.

McCarty was previously married to Vern McCarty, who also acted as her campaign manager and later took over her seat on the city council; McCarty died on September 29, 2023. Deborah McCarty married John Rea Myer around 1991; they had three children. Myer died on June 26, 2020.

She later taught at Holy Innocents' Episcopal School.

McCarty was honored by the Atlanta City Council in 2025.
