= Carolyn Long Banks =

American civil rights activist and politician (1940–2023)

Member of the Atlanta City Council At-large Post 14
- In office 1980–1997
- Preceded by: Marvin S. Arrington Sr.
- Succeeded by: Position abolished

69th President of the National League of Cities
- In office 1995
- Preceded by: Sharpe James
- Succeeded by: Greg Lashutka

Personal details
- Born: October 30, 1940 McDonough, Georgia, U.S.
- Died: April 12, 2023 (aged 82)
- Education: Clark College (1962); Georgia State University
- Occupation: Activist, politician

Carolyn Long Banks (October 30, 1940 – April 12, 2023) was an American civil rights activist and politician who helped found the Atlanta Student Movement and was the first black woman to serve on the Atlanta City Council.

== Early life and education ==
A fourth-generation Atlantan, Banks was born in McDonough on October 30, 1940, to Ralph A. Long, Sr. and Rubye Carolyn Hall Long. She had a brother, Ralph. Her father was a principal and her mother was chair of a high school English department. Banks went to Our Lady of Lourdes Atlanta, then attended Turner High School after her father became principal there. Banks's aunt Annette Lucille Hall was the first black person to enroll at Georgia State University.

Initially, Banks planned to study fashion design at either UCLA or Pratt Institute, but she agreed to attend Clark University, her parents' alma mater, for a year.

During the Atlanta sit-ins, Banks was arrested at least four times, including in 1960 during a sit-in at Rich's to protest its segregated restaurant, Magnolia Room. Banks was joined by Lucille Scott of the Atlanta Daily World; she ordered a salad. "I was so nervous; we ate our food and left," she said. "Then I was arrested."

Banks also helped to produce the 1960 manifesto An Appeal for Human Rights.

Banks later worked as a teacher and as a buyer at Rich's. She had been asked by the National Urban League to apply there and help integrate the store. Banks worked at Rich's as its first black buyer until 1983.

== Atlanta City Council ==
In early 1980, Banks was appointed to the Atlanta City Council's at-large post 14 to succeed Marvin S. Arrington Sr. after he became council president, replacing Carl Ware. Banks had been traveling in New York at the time, and her parents tentatively accepted the position for her. Her appointment gave black council-members a majority of 9–8. She won re-election to the seat multiple times.

During her tenure, Banks sponsored legislation to ban AK-47 assault rifles, and also was in office during the Atlanta child murders from 1979 through 1981. "I participated in all 26 funerals," said Banks. "It was very difficult." She later served as chair of the public safety committee.

During Freaknik in the early 1990s, Banks was opposed to mayor Bill Campbell's plans to block off neighborhoods and stop wild behavior, worried the tactics could spark violence. She added that "the city too busy to hate is gearing up for the confrontation of its life".

Banks was the president of the National League of Cities in 1994.

In 1996, the Atlanta City Council approved a new charter which reduced the number of at-large posts from six to three. The next year, Banks and fellow council member Robb Pitts both took the opportunity to run for Council President. Banks lost the race to Pitts.

== Personal life ==
Banks converted to Catholicism when she turned eighteen; she attended Saint Paul of the Cross in Atlanta. She was also a lifetime member of the NAACP.

Banks's ex-husband was in the United States Army Ordnance Corps and served in the Vietnam War. They divorced in 1969. Banks had two children: a daughter, April, and a son, James.

Following her career in politics, Banks worked for Lockheed Martin from 2000 to 2009. In 2021, she was inducted into the Atlanta Business League Women of Vision Hall of Fame.

Banks died on April 12, 2023, at the age of 82.

== Writings ==
- Banks, Carolyn Long; Lashutka, Greg (September 1995). "Deficits Are Destroying Our Future". Illinois Municipal Review: 19–20.
