= Ira L. Jackson =

American politician

Ira Jackson

Member of the Atlanta City Council District 10
- In office 1974 – August 1990
- Preceded by: Position established
- Succeeded by: C. T. Martin

Member of the Atlanta Board of Aldermen 7th Ward, Position 2
- In office 1970–1974
- Succeeded by: Position abolished

Personal details
- Born: Ira L. Jackson; 1929
- Died: February 24, 2024 (aged 94–95)
- Education: Clark College (1957)

Ira L. Jackson (1929 – February 24, 2024) was an American politician who served on the Atlanta City Council and as the commissioner of Hartsfield Atlanta International Airport. Jackson was once known as one of Atlanta's most powerful figures before his conviction in a bribery scandal in 1994.

Ira L. Jackson was born to Willie and Annie Jackson. Jackson graduated from Clark College in 1957, where he met his future wife, Annie Fair Shumate. They were married for over 30 years. Jackson was a member of Alpha Phi Alpha during college.

During the 1960s, he owned a string of small businesses, including a grocery store and a Pure Oil dealership that became the largest in Georgia.

Jackson served on the Atlanta Board of Aldermen for the 7th Ward, Position 2, from 1970 through 1974; then, the board was renamed to the Atlanta City Council, with Jackson representing District 10 from 1974 through 1990. He resigned from the Atlanta City Council in August 1990 after being picked by Atlanta mayor Maynard Jackson (no relation) to be the city's aviation commissioner; evidence revealed later in court suggested that Jackson had approached the mayor to ask for the job. He resigned as commissioner on March 8, 1992.

In 1987, the Georgia Municipal Association selected Jackson as its president. He also chaired the Atlanta Regional Commission.

Jackson was convicted in federal court in January 1994 on 130 counts of mail fraud, accepting bribes, and tax evasion in a scheme during the 1980s that illegally earned him over $1 million. During the trial, led by prosecutor Sally Yates, Jackson claimed that prosecutors were "out to get all black elected officials". He was sentenced to 3 1/2 years in prison. The Eleventh Circuit upheld the conviction on appeal.

He was imprisoned at Federal Prison Camp, Montgomery in Montgomery, Alabama, where his Bureau of Prisons register number was 44120-019.

Following his release, Jackson became a reverend of the Episcopal Diocese of Georgia in 2009 at Grace Episcopal Church in Sandersville, Georgia.

Jackson had a son, Ira Jackson Jr.

Jackson died on February 24, 2024 at the age of 94.
