= Marvin S. Arrington Sr. =

American judge and politician (1941–2023)

President of the Atlanta City Council
- In office 1980 – January 5, 1998
- Preceded by: Carl Ware
- Succeeded by: Robb Pitts

Member of the Atlanta City Council At-large Post 14
- In office January 7, 1974 – 1980
- Preceded by: Position established
- Succeeded by: Carolyn Long Banks

Member of the Atlanta Board of Aldermen Ninth Ward, Position 2
- In office 1969–1973
- Succeeded by: Position abolished

Personal details
- Born: Marvin Stephens Arrington; February 10, 1941 Atlanta, Georgia, U.S.
- Died: July 5, 2023 (aged 82) Atlanta, Georgia, U.S.
- Spouse: Marilyn Jones (m. 1971)
- Children: Marvin Arrington Jr.; Michelle Arrington
- Education: Clark College, 1963 (BA); Emory University School of Law, 1967 (JD)

Marvin Stephens Arrington Sr. (February 10, 1941 – July 5, 2023) was an American judge in the Superior Court of Fulton County, Georgia and a politician in the city of Atlanta. Elected to the Atlanta Board of Aldermen in 1969 (a precursor to the present-day City Council), he served as President of the Atlanta City Council for 17 years until his unsuccessful bid for mayor in 1997. Arrington was one of the first two black students to undertake full-time studies at the Emory University School of Law in 1965. He served on the Emory Board of Trustees.

== Early years ==
Arrington was born in Grady Hospital in Atlanta, Georgia and resided in Atlanta all his life. His father, George Arrington, was a truck driver and his mother, Maggie, was employed as a domestic worker. He grew up in the Grady Homes public housing project in downtown Atlanta.

== Education ==
Arrington graduated from Henry McNeal Turner High School in 1959 and went on to attend Clark College (now Clark Atlanta University) on a football scholarship. He graduated from Clark in 1963 with a bachelor of arts degree in sociology and was a member of Kappa Alpha Psi fraternity. In 1964, he began his legal studies at Howard University, but transferred to Emory University School of Law after his first year. He graduated with his juris doctor degree from Emory in 1967.

== Career ==
From 1969 Arrington was for 25 years on the Atlanta Board of Aldermen (later Atlanta City Council), including 7 years as president. After becoming president, his post was filled by Carolyn Long Banks.

In 1973, Arrington joined Kleiner and Herman; later with other Kleiner and Herman partners he formed Arrington, Winter, Krischer and Goger.

In 1989 Arrington and Donald Hollowell formed Arrington and Hollowell, specializing in corporate bonds, labor relations, litigation, and worker's compensation.

In 1997 he ran, unsuccessfully, for mayor, against incumbent Bill Campbell.

In 2002 he was appointed judge in the Fulton County Superior Court by the governor, Roy Barnes, and was elected for a full term in November. Judge Arrington declared Georgia's hate crime law unconstitutional, a decision later upheld by the Supreme Court of the State of Georgia.

In 2005 he was in the Fulton court house when Rowland Barnes was shot, and was in lockdown in his office with a number of court staff.

In 2008 he was subject of some controversy when he cleared his courtroom of white people (notably lawyers), to speak to the remaining, primarily defendants. Later he summed up what he said as "Don't violate the law, make something out of yourself, go to school, find a role model, somebody that will help you advance your life." He said that "In retrospect, it was a mistake," and that he would shortly deliver the same speech to everyone.

== Personal life and death ==
Arrington married Marilyn Jones in 1971. They had a son and a daughter, both lawyers.

Marvin S. Arrington Sr. died on July 5, 2023, at the age of 82.

== Awards and recognition ==
Arrington was voted one of Atlanta's top 25 lawyers by Atlanta Magazine. Black Enterprise Magazine included Arrington and Hollowell in their list of America's "Top 10 Black Law Firms".

== Published works ==
- Making My Mark: The Story of a Man Who Wouldn't Stay in His Place, autobiography, 2008, Mercer University Press
