= Robb Pitts =

American politician (born 1941)

Chair of the Fulton County Board of Commissioners
- Incumbent
- Assumed office December 20, 2017
- Preceded by: John Eaves

President of the Atlanta City Council
- In office January 5, 1998 – January 7, 2002
- Preceded by: Marvin S. Arrington Sr.
- Succeeded by: Cathy Woolard

Personal details
- Born: December 27, 1941 (age 84)
- Party: Democratic
- Education: Ohio University (attended); Kent State University (BA); Emory University (MBA)
- Website: Office website Campaign website

Robert L. "Robb" Pitts (born December 27, 1941) is an American politician from the state of Georgia. He was elected in 2017 as Chairman of the Fulton County Board of Commissioners. Pitts previously served on an at-large seat on the Atlanta City Council from 1977 to 1998, including a term as Council President from 1998 to 2001. After losing a mayoral bid to Shirley Franklin in 2001, Pitts was elected to the Fulton County Commission from 2003 to 2014.

Born outside of Macon, Pitts was raised in Dayton, Ohio and attended Kent State University, where he attained his first job teaching Spanish. After moving to Atlanta in 1969 to teach at Clark College (now Clark Atlanta University), he later worked for the Metro Atlanta Chamber of Commerce. He first ran for Atlanta City Council in 1973, but won his first term against the incumbent in 1977. On August 1, 1987, Pitts formally introduced delivering Atlanta's bid for the 1996 Summer Olympics to the International Olympic Committee, in place of Atlanta Mayor Andrew Young, alongside Billy Payne.

Pitts was sworn in as Atlanta City Council president on January 5, 1998.

In 2026, Pitts ran for re-election to a third full term as Chairman of the Fulton County Commission. In the initial Democratic primary held on May 19, 2026, he placed second with 34.8% of the vote, trailing former county commissioner Mo Ivory (39.9%) and leading fellow commissioner Marvin Arrington Jr. (25.3%). Because no candidate cleared the 50% majority threshold, Pitts advanced to a primary runoff election against Ivory on June 16, 2026. Pitts was defeated in the runoff election, capturing roughly 34.7% of the vote to Ivory's 65.3%, effectively bringing an end to his tenure as commission chair at the conclusion of his term on December 31, 2026.
