= 2026 Fulton County elections =

2026 Georgia local elections

- November 3, 2026

A general election was held in Fulton County, Georgia, on November 3, 2026, to elect various county-level positions. Partisan primary elections were held on May 19, alongside nonpartisan judicial and school board elections in the county. Primary runoff elections were held on June 16 in races where no candidate received a majority of the vote.

== Board of Commissioners ==
=== Chair ===
==== Democratic primary ====
===== Candidates =====
====== Nominee ======
- Mo Ivory, member of the commission for the 4th district (2025–present)

====== Eliminated in runoff ======
- Robb Pitts, incumbent commissioner

====== Eliminated in primary ======
- Marvin Arrington, member of the commission for the 5th district (2014–present)

===== Endorsements =====
Mo Ivory

Organizations

- Fair Fight Action (runoff endorsement)
- Georgia Conservation Voters

===== Results =====
Democratic primary
Party	Candidate	Votes	%
Democratic	Mo Ivory	64,300	39.88
Democratic	Robb Pitts (incumbent)	56,109	34.80
Democratic	Marvin Arrington	40,825	25.32
Total votes		161,234	100.00

===== Runoff =====
====== Results ======
Democratic primary runoff
Party	Candidate	Votes	%
Democratic	Mo Ivory	46,794	65.96
Democratic	Robb Pitts (incumbent)	24,152	34.04
Total votes		70,946	100.00

==== Republican primary ====
===== Candidates =====
====== Nominee ======
- Eric J. Tatum, attorney

===== Results =====
Republican primary
Party	Candidate	Votes	%
Republican	Eric J. Tatum	36,959	100.00
Total votes		36,959	100.00

==== General election ====
===== Results =====
2026 Fulton County Board of Commissioners chair election
Party	Candidate	Votes	%
Democratic	Mo Ivory	335,820	75.00
Republican	Eric J. Tatum	111,926	25.00
Total votes		447,746	100.00

=== District 1 ===
==== Republican primary ====
===== Candidates =====
====== Nominee ======
- Bridget Thorne, incumbent commissioner

===== Results =====
Republican primary
Party	Candidate	Votes	%
Republican	Bridget Thorne (incumbent)	12,265	100.00
Total votes		12,265	100.00

==== Democratic primary ====
===== Candidates =====
====== Nominee ======
- Maggie Goldman, realtor and nominee in 2022

===== Endorsements =====
Maggie Goldman

Organizations

- Georgia Conservation Voters

===== Results =====
Democratic primary
Party	Candidate	Votes	%
Democratic	Maggie Goldman	15,457	100.00
Total votes		15,457	100.00

=== General election ===
==== Results ====
2026 Fulton County Board of Commissioners District 1 election
Party	Candidate	Votes	%
Democratic	Maggie Goldman	42,921	56.68
Republican	Bridget Thorne (incumbent)	32,803	43.32
Total votes		75,724	100.00

=== District 3 ===
==== Democratic primary ====
===== Candidates =====
====== Nominee ======
- Jodi Merriday, neighborhood ombudsman

====== Eliminated in runoff ======
- Lee Morris, former Republican commissioner from this district

====== Eliminated in primary ======
- Kimberly Bean, operations manager
- Kiddada Grey, author
- Reed Stillson, barista

===== Results =====
Democratic primary
Party	Candidate	Votes	%
Democratic	Lee Morris	6,895	31.95
Democratic	Jodi Merriday	6,172	28.60
Democratic	Kimberly Bean	4,479	20.75
Democratic	Kiddada Grey	2,877	13.33
Democratic	Reed Stillson	1,158	5.37
Total votes		21,581	100.00

===== Runoff =====
====== Post-primary endorsements ======
Jodi Merriday

Organizations

- Fair Fight Action

====== Results ======
Democratic primary runoff
Party	Candidate	Votes	%
Democratic	Jodi Merriday	5,246	58.59
Democratic	Lee Morris	3,708	41.41
Total votes		8,954	100.00

==== Republican primary ====
===== Candidates =====
====== Declared ======
- Paul Burton, retiree
- Rebecca King

===== Results =====
Republican primary
Party	Candidate	Votes	%
Republican	Paul Burton	5,833	63.29
Republican	Rebecca King	3,383	36.71
Total votes		9,216	100.00

=== General election ===
==== Results ====
2026 Fulton County Board of Commissioners District 3 election
Party	Candidate	Votes	%
Democratic	Jodi Merriday	51,804	64.24
Republican	Paul Burton	28,840	35.76
Total votes		80,644	100.00

==== Results ====
2026 Fulton County Board of Commissioners District 4 special election
Party	Candidate	Votes	%
Democratic	Rohit Malhotra	46,317	66.72
Democratic	Aaron Sampson	17,047	24.56
Independent	Natalie Hall	4,286	6.17
Independent	Karen Rene	1,774	2.56
Total votes		69,424	100.00

=== District 5 ===
==== Democratic primary ====
===== Candidates =====
====== Nominee ======
- Helen Willis, member of the South Fulton city council

====== Eliminated in runoff ======
- Sojourner Grimmett, marketing

====== Eliminated in primary ======
- Dejia Swindell, marketing strategist
- Jazz Thomas-Jones, podcaster and minister

===== Endorsements =====
Sojourner Grimmett

Organizations

- Georgia Conservation Voters

===== Results =====
Democratic primary
Party	Candidate	Votes	%
Democratic	Helen Willis	16,902	43.22
Democratic	Sojourner Grimmett	13,834	35.37
Democratic	Dejia Swindell	4,955	12.67
Democratic	Jazz Thomas-Jones	3,419	8.74
Total votes		39,110	100.00

===== Runoff =====
====== Results ======
Democratic primary runoff
Party	Candidate	Votes	%
Democratic	Helen Willis	11,274	57.39
Democratic	Sojourner Grimmett	8,371	42.61
Total votes		19,645	100.00

==== Republican primary ====
===== Candidates =====
====== Nominee ======
- Tiffany Henyard, former mayor of Dolton, Illinois (2021–2025)

===== Results =====
Republican primary
Party	Candidate	Votes	%
Republican	Tiffany Henyard	1,140	100.00
Total votes		1,140	100.00

==== Results ====
2026 Fulton County Board of Commissioners District 5 election
Party	Candidate	Votes	%
Democratic	Helen Willis	70,642	94.60
Republican	Tiffany Henyard	4,031	5.40
Total votes		74,673	100.00

== School Board ==
=== District 2 ===
==== Candidates ====
===== Declared =====
- Mary Kaye Pepperman, retiree

===== Declined =====
- Lillie Pozatek, incumbent board member

==== Results ====
General election
Candidate	Votes	%
Mary Kaye Pepperman	11,654	100.00
Total votes	11,654	100.00

=== District 5 ===
==== Candidates ====
===== Declared =====
- Jean Antoine, senior sales consultant
- Kristin McCabe, incumbent board member

==== Results ====
General election
Candidate	Votes	%
Kristin McCabe (incumbent)	9,283	67.38
Jean Antoine	4,495	32.62
Total votes	13,778	100.00

=== District 6 ===
==== Candidates ====
===== Declared =====
- Kimberly R. Dove, incumbent board member

==== Results ====
General election
Candidate	Votes	%
Kimberly R. Dove (incumbent)	15,321	100.00
Total votes	15,321	100.00

=== District 7 ===
==== Candidates ====
===== Declared =====
- Michelle Morancie, incumbent board member
- John Seeli, manager

==== Results ====
General election
Candidate	Votes	%
Michelle Morancie (incumbent)	11,283	75.68
John Seeli	3,626	24.32
Total votes	14,909	100.00

== State Court Judge ==
=== Fred Eady's seat ===
==== Candidates ====
===== Declared =====
- Fred Eady, incumbent judge

==== Results ====
Fred Eady's seat
Candidate	Votes	%
Fred Eady (incumbent)	175,358	100.00
Total votes	175,358	100.00

=== Eric Richardson's seat ===
==== Candidates ====
===== Declared =====
- Eric Richardson, incumbent judge

==== Results ====
Eric Richardson's seat
Candidate	Votes	%
Eric Richardson (incumbent)	176,238	100.00
Total votes	176,238	100.00

=== Jay M. Roth's seat ===
==== Candidates ====
===== Declared =====
- Jay M. Roth, incumbent judge
- Miracle Williams, senior assistant solicitor general

==== Results ====
Jay M. Roth's seat
Candidate	Votes	%
Miracle Williams	125,804	61.19
Jay M. Roth (incumbent)	79,803	38.81
Total votes	205,607	100.00

== Georgia Soil & Water Conservation District Supervisor ==
=== Candidates ===
==== Declared ====
- Zane Placie, actuary
- Walter Rekuc, incumbent supervisor
- Jason Ulseth, incumbent supervisor

=== Endorsements ===
Zane Placie

Political parties

- Libertarian Party of Georgia

=== Results ===
General election (vote for 2)
Candidate	Votes	%
Walter Rekuc (incumbent)	312,772	43.62
Jason Ulseth (incumbent)	281,606	39.27
Zane Placie	122,698	17.11
Total votes	717,076	100.00
