= Rohit Malhotra =

American politician (born 1986)

- Official portrait, 2026

Member of the Fulton County Board of Commissioners from the 4th district
- Incumbent
- Assumed office November 16, 2026
- Preceded by: Mo Ivory

Personal details
- Born: September 3, 1986 (age 40) Chicago, Illinois, U.S.
- Party: Democratic
- Other political affiliations: Working Families Party
- Education: Emory University (BA); Harvard Kennedy School (MPP)
- Website: Campaign website

Rohit Malhotra (born September 3, 1986) is an American politician and nonprofit executive who has served as a member of the Fulton County Board of Commissioners from the 4th district since November 2026. He was elected in a 2026 special election and is the first Asian American and first Indian American to serve on the board. A member of the Democratic Party of Georgia, Malhotra founded the Center for Civic Innovation, an Atlanta nonprofit, in 2014, and was the runner-up in the 2025 Atlanta City Council presidential election.

== Early life and education ==
Malhotra was born in Chicago after his parents immigrated from India. His father worked as a parking lot attendant and his mother worked in fast food restaurants. The family moved to the Atlanta area when he was in middle school, and he graduated from Central Gwinnett High School. He earned a degree in philosophy from Emory University, before receiving a master's in public policy from the Harvard Kennedy School in 2013.

== Career ==
After college, Malhotra worked in marketing and digital outreach for Malaria No More and the ONE Campaign, and later on digital communications strategy for the Democratic National Committee. In the summer of 2012, as an Ash Center Government Innovations Fellow, he worked in the White House Office of Management and Budget on social impact bonds.

In 2014, Malhotra founded the Center for Civic Innovation, a nonprofit with the goal of improving community understanding of government, and served as its executive director. In 2015, he was named an Echoing Green fellow for his work with the organization.

== Political career ==
=== 2025 Atlanta City Council president campaign ===
Malhotra launched his first bid for public office in 2025, running for president of the Atlanta City Council, and took a leave of absence from the Center for Civic Innovation to campaign. His campaign message included improving economic mobility, while his opponent Marci Collier Overstreet campaigned on her track record in the city council. Ultimately, Overstreet narrowly won the election with 51% of the vote.

=== Fulton County Board of Commissioners ===
After incumbent commissioner Mo Ivory stepped down from her position to run for chair of the Fulton County Board of Commissioners, Malhotra announced his bid to run in the subsequent special election for the District 4 seat. He received endorsements from former gubernatorial candidate Stacey Abrams and Congressman Ro Khanna. On November 3, 2026, Malhotra defeated three other candidates and won the seat outright with about 67% of the vote.

Malhotra was sworn in on November 16, 2026, at the Fulton County Library System's Central Library in downtown Atlanta, to serve the remainder of Ivory's term, which ends in 2028. He is the board's first millennial, first Asian American, and first Indian American member.

At his first commission meeting on November 18, 2026, Malhotra introduced a resolution reaffirming gun violence as a public health crisis in Fulton County and directing funding toward hospital and community-based violence prevention and intervention programs. The county had first declared gun violence a public health crisis in 2022 under a resolution sponsored by Commissioner Marvin Arrington Jr. Other commissioners questioned the measure's timeline, cost, and level of detail, and its proposed $1 million in funding was amended to $500,000, with the potential to increase to $1 million. The resolution passed 4–0–1, with Commissioner Bridget Thorne abstaining.
