= Maggie Goldman =

American realtor and political candidate (born 1984/85)

Maggie Goldman (born 1984 or 1985) is an American realtor and political candidate from Johns Creek, Georgia. A Democrat, she was her party's nominee for the Fulton County Board of Commissioners in District 1 in 2022 which she lost. She ran again in 2026 and won with 57 percent of the vote.

== Early life and education ==
Goldman was raised in Warwick, Rhode Island. She graduated from Trinity University with a bachelor’s degree in political science and earned a master’s degree in school counseling from Assumption University in Worcester, Massachusetts.

== Career ==
Goldman works as a realtor in north Fulton County. She served as the Georgia coordinator for Pete Buttigieg's 2020 presidential campaign in 2019 and 2020, and formerly chaired the board of Fulton County branch of "Continuum of Care", an organization coordinating homelessness services in the county. In 2022, she was the representative to the city of Roswell for Family Promise of North Fulton, arguing against their budget cuts for nonprofits. In her role with Continuum of Care, Goldman pushed for Fulton County commissioners to open warming centers for homeless people ahead of predicted extremely cold weather in February 2026.

She helped to organize attendance at Representative Rich McCormick's town hall after the Department of Government Efficiency (DOGE) cuts in February 2025, noting to CBS News that many of the people she brought did not support President Trump. She also attended a rally in support of gun control at the Georgia State Capitol with her son, noting that she felt that he was safer there than at school.

== Political campaigns ==
=== 2022 ===
Goldman ran for the District 1 seat on the Fulton County Board of Commissioners in 2022, following the retirement of incumbent Liz Hausmann. The district covers Johns Creek and eastern portions of Alpharetta, Roswell and Sandy Springs. She said that her main campaign priority was to "have people pay less taxes" through a reform of the county property tax assessment system, and argued that her opponent's points about election reform were "wrapped in election conspiracies." She lost the November general election to Republican Bridget Thorne, who took 50.28 percent of the vote to Goldman's 49.72 percent.

=== 2026 ===
Goldman qualified again for the District 1 seat in March 2026 and was unopposed in the Democratic primary held on May 19, setting up a rematch against Thorne, now the incumbent, in the November 3 general election. Goldman called on Thorne to recuse herself from executive sessions on the county's legal response to the federal election-records investigation by the FBI under President Trump, after two Democratic commissioners questioned whether Thorne could be trusted with confidential material. A debate will be held on October 5 between the two candidates.

Goldman won the general election with 57 percent of the vote.

== Election results ==
Fulton County Board of Commissioners District 1 General Election, 2022
Party	Candidate	Votes	%
Republican	Bridget Thorne	36,402	50.3%
Democratic	Maggie Goldman	36,008	49.7%
Total votes		72,410	100.0%
Republican hold			

Fulton County Board of Commissioners District 1 Primary Election, 2022
Party	Candidate	Votes	%
Democratic	Maggie Goldman	7,553	73.4
Democratic	Ricky Blalock	2,739	26.6
Total votes		10,292	100.0
