= KFTY =

KFTY may refer to:

- KFTY-LD, a low-power television station (channel 2, virtual 45) licensed to serve Middletown, California, United States
- KEMO-TV, a television station (channel 32, virtual 50) licensed to serve Fremont, California, which held the call sign KFTY from 1981 to 2011
- Fulton County Airport (Georgia)
