= Chattahoochee Hills, Georgia =

- City
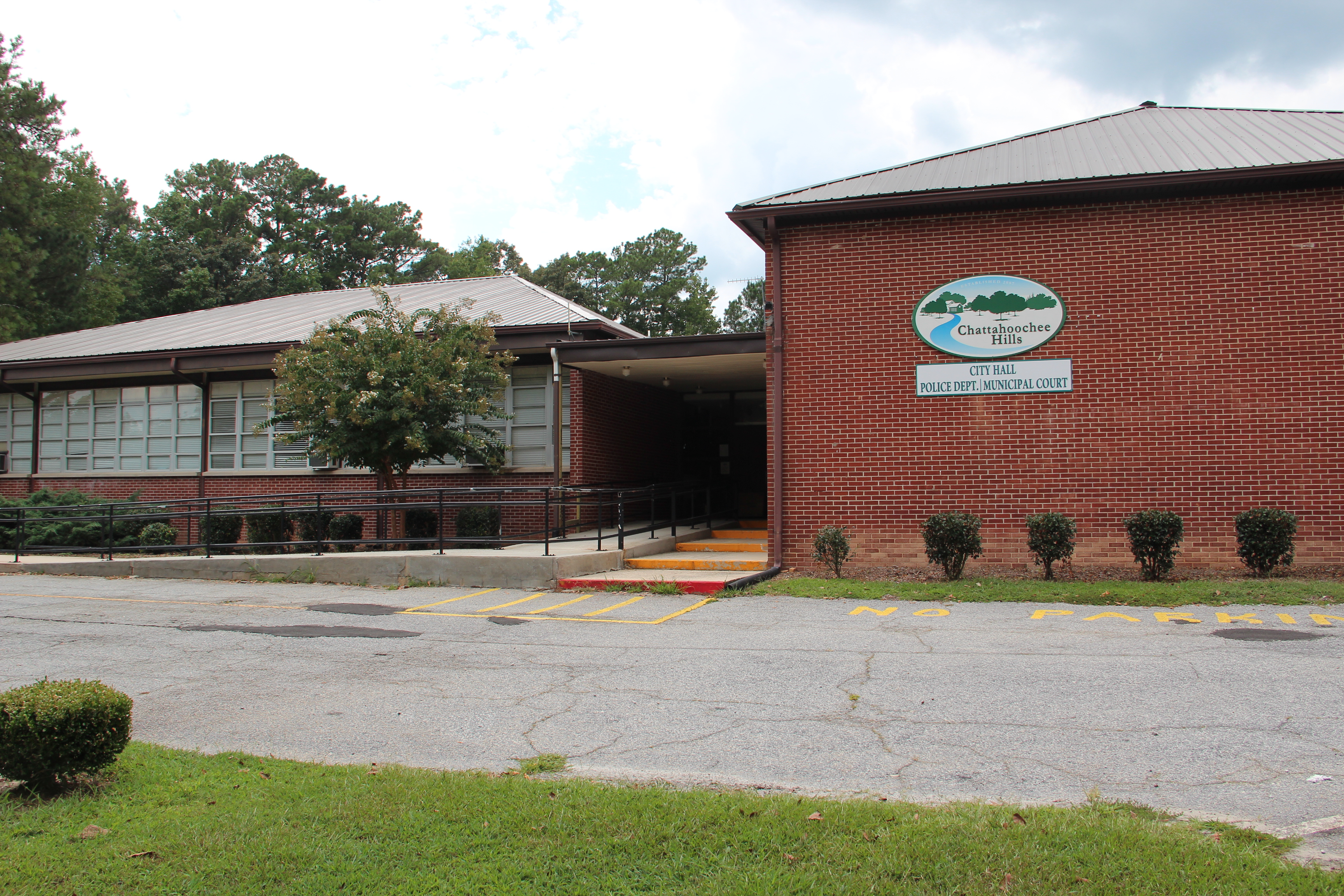
- Chattahoochee Hills city hall

- Flag Logo

- Location in Fulton County and the state of Georgia

- Location of Chattahoochee Hills in [Atlanta]
- Coordinates: 33°34′10″N 84°44′39″W
- Country: United States
- State: Georgia
- County: Fulton

Government
  - Mayor: Camille Lowe

Area
  - Total: 59.27 sq mi (153.50 km^{2})
  - Land: 58.18 sq mi (150.68 km^{2})
  - Water: 1.08 sq mi (2.81 km^{2})
- Elevation: 876 ft (267 m)

Population (2020)
  - Total: 2,950
  - Density: 50.7/sq mi (19.58/km^{2})
- Time zone: EST
  - Summer (DST): EDT
- FIPS code: 13-15552
- GNIS feature ID: 2424930
- Website: chatthillsga.us

Chattahoochee Hills (formerly Chattahoochee Hill Country) is a city in southern Fulton County, Georgia, United States. It is the incorporated part of a region called "Chattahoochee Hill Country", an area encompassing approximately 60,000 acres (240 km^{2}) southwest of Atlanta, bordered on the northwest side by the Chattahoochee River.

Unlike the rest of metro Atlanta, it is still relatively undeveloped, and most of its rural character remains unchanged. The majority of the wider area comprises the west-southwest part of southern Fulton, and smaller adjacent parts of southern Douglas, eastern Carroll, and northern Coweta counties. As of 2020, its population was 2,950.

== History ==
The area that is now southwest Fulton was originally Campbell County, but it agreed to annexation by neighboring Fulton County on January 1, 1932, to reduce administrative costs.

Historically, much of the west/center of the current city was considered the town of Rico, with other communities, including Goodes, Rivertown, County Line, Campbellton, Pumpkintown, and several other historic communities also within the new city's boundaries.

The idea of "Chattahoochee Hills" is very recent. This developed from attempts to incorporate all of Fulton County into cities following the 2005 incorporation of Sandy Springs in the north part of the county, as well as local efforts to take control of zoning and land subdivision in the multi-county Chattahoochee Hill Country area.

During the 2006 session, the Georgia General Assembly passed a law allowing the Fulton section of the area to incorporate as a city (the only type of municipality allowed in Georgia), the purpose being the municipalization of that county, and to allow local residents to have local control of zoning, with the goal of preserving as much as possible of the rural character of the community while controlling development. Originally, this was to be implemented by concentrating the majority of the development in three planned villages. The nearby city of Palmetto annexed one of the village sites, leaving a gerrymander-looking arm of Palmetto sticking northwest into the heart of the new city.

On June 19, 2007, residents voted by an 83% to 17% margin in a local referendum to incorporate the 33,000-acre (130 km^{2}) portion within Fulton as the city of "Chattahoochee Hill Country". Later annexation could incorporate the portions remaining in other counties.

Chattahoochee Hill Country became a city on December 1, 2007, with the first elected officials taking office a few days later. On September 23, 2008, the city was renamed by an ordinance as "Chattahoochee Hills".

Subsequent zoning updates have maintained the vision of preservation, but have decoupled the development from specific landowner sites. The result foreseen by the zoning will permanently protect 70% of the city's land as forest and farm, while consolidating the development on the balance of the city's territory in a variety of hamlet, village and town typologies scattered throughout the preserved land, developed on a 'first come/first served' basis. Land will be conserved through a variety of methods, including preservation internal to developments, as well as external preservation through the sale and purchase of Transferable development rights (TDR's).

In 2014 the city responded to community petitions by annexing approximately 5,473 acres to its north along with several hundred residents (from the unincorporated portion of Fulton County), an area which included the original county seat of historic Campbell County, Campbellton.

In 2014 the city also annexed approximately 180 acres with no residents in Coweta County at the request of the developer of Serenbe, who had property in both counties.

== Demographics ==
Historical population
Census	Pop.	Note	%±
2010	2,378		—
2020	2,950		24.1%
2025 (est.)	3,524	▲	19.5%
U.S. Decennial Census; 1850-1870 1870-1880; 1890-1910 1920-1930; 1940 1950 1960; 1970 1980 1990; 2000 2010

=== Racial and ethnic composition ===
Chattahoochee Hills city, Georgia – Racial and ethnic composition Note: the US Census treats Hispanic/Latino as an ethnic category. This table excludes Latinos from the racial categories and assigns them to a separate category. Hispanics/Latinos may be of any race.
Race / Ethnicity (NH = Non-Hispanic)	Pop 2010	Pop 2020	% 2010	% 2020
White alone (NH)	1,562	2,026	65.69%	68.68%
Black or African American alone (NH)	652	647	27.42%	21.93%
Native American or Alaska Native alone (NH)	5	5	0.21%	0.17%
Asian alone (NH)	3	7	0.13%	0.24%
Native Hawaiian or Pacific Islander alone (NH)	0	0	0.00%	0.00%
Other race alone (NH)	2	13	0.08%	0.44%
Mixed race or Multiracial (NH)	22	99	0.93%	3.36%
Hispanic or Latino (any race)	132	153	5.55%	5.19%
Total	2,378	2,950	100.00%	100.00%

=== 2020 census ===
As of the 2020 census, Chattahoochee Hills had a population of 2,950. The median age was 50.3 years. 16.3% of residents were under the age of 18 and 24.3% were 65 years of age or older. For every 100 females there were 101.5 males, and for every 100 females age 18 and over there were 99.5 males age 18 and over.

1.6% of residents lived in urban areas, while 98.4% lived in rural areas.

There were 1,218 households in Chattahoochee Hills, of which 24.1% had children under the age of 18 living in them. Of all households, 55.3% were married-couple households, 18.2% were households with a male householder and no spouse or partner present, and 21.2% were households with a female householder and no spouse or partner present. About 24.1% of all households were made up of individuals and 11.9% had someone living alone who was 65 years of age or older. There were 786 families residing in the city.

There were 1,439 housing units, of which 15.4% were vacant. The homeowner vacancy rate was 2.4% and the rental vacancy rate was 18.8%.
