= Charlie Brown (Georgia politician) =

American politician

Member of the Fulton County Board of Commissioners
- In office 1966–1979
- In office 1941–1948

Member of the Georgia State Senate
- In office January 14, 1957 – January 11, 1965
- Preceded by: G. Everett Millican
- Succeeded by: Fletcher Thompson
- Constituency: 52nd district (1957‍–‍1963); 34th district (1963‍–‍1965)

Personal details
- Born: Charles Manley Brown Jr. November 20, 1902 Birmingham, Alabama, U.S.
- Died: May 19, 1995 (aged 92)
- Party: Democratic
- Spouse: Elise Anderson
- Children: 2
- Parents: Charles Manley Brown Sr.; Mamie Susan Fickett Brown
- Education: Georgia Tech
- Profession: Politician

Charles Manley Brown Jr. (November 20, 1902 – May 19, 1995) was a long-time U.S. politician in Atlanta, sometimes called Charlie Brown.

== Biography ==
Charlie Brown was born in Birmingham, Alabama, the third child and second son of storekeeper Charles Manley Brown Sr., and Mamie Susan "Sook" Fickett Brown. His father died in 1904, five months before the birth of their fifth child. Charles Sr.'s father, Henry Hart Brown, had been a journalist, lawyer, and politician, serving several terms in the Alabama state legislature and one term as sheriff.

A graduate of Georgia Tech, Brown was a commissioner of Fulton County, Georgia (where Atlanta is the county seat) from 1941 to 1948, and from 1966 to 1979. He served as chairman of the commission from 1945 to 1947 and 1976 to 1978, and at other times during 1966, 1968, 1971, and 1974. He also served as a state senator from Fulton County in the Georgia General Assembly from 1957 to 1964, and retired from politics in 1979. He unsuccessfully ran for mayor of Atlanta in 1949, 1953, and 1961. He was touted as a candidate in 1957, and would-be supporters mailed out thousands of postcards to support a write-in vote for him, but he never entered the race officially that year.

He served on the Fulton-DeKalb Hospital Authority which oversees Grady Memorial Hospital. He was involved in many other programs, including starting both MARTA and Atlanta–Fulton County Stadium. He was also involved in the creation of the Fulton County Airport in west Atlanta, which was named Charlie Brown Field in his honor.

=== Personal life ===
Brown married Elise Anderson. They had two daughters.
