= 2025 Atlanta City Council presidential election =

Local election in Georgia

- November 4, 2025

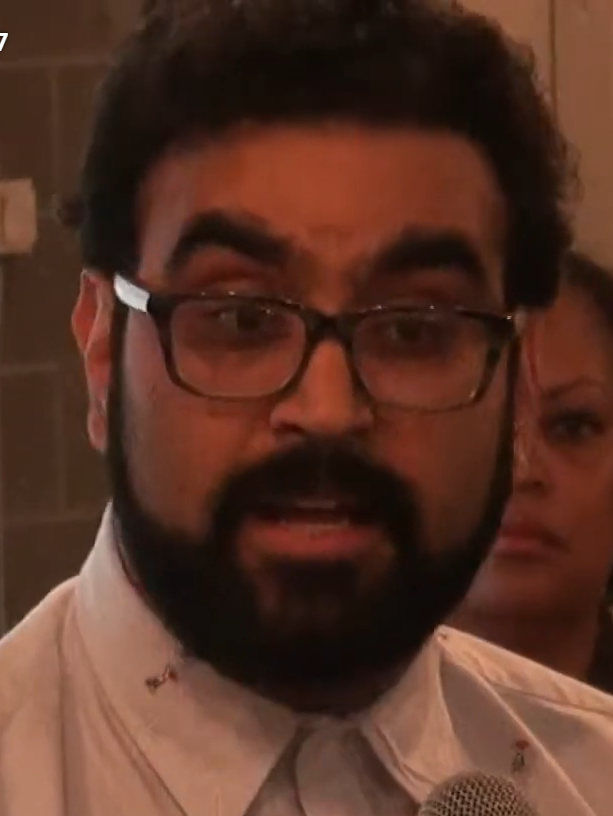
Candidate	Marci Collier Overstreet	Rohit Malhotra
Party	Nonpartisan	Nonpartisan
Popular vote	52,389	49,617
Percentage	51.4%	48.6%
- Runoff Results by precinct Collier Overstreet: 50–60% 60–70% 70–80% 80–90% Malhotra: 50–60% 60–70% 70–80% 80–90%
President before election
Doug Shipman
Elected President
Marci Collier Overstreet

The 2025 Atlanta City Council presidential election was held on November 4, 2025, to elect the Atlanta City Council President. Incumbent president Doug Shipman retired after serving one four-year term. City councilmember Marci Collier Overstreet won the election. The election was held concurrently with elections for city council, mayor, school board and the Georgia Public Service Commission.

== Background ==
Shipman was initially planning to run for re-election but ultimately decided against it in February 2025. He stated that he needed to focus on family health matters, and would not be able to properly fulfill the duties of the job over the next four years.

== Candidates ==
=== Declared ===
- Rohit Malhotra, founder of the Center for Civic Innovation
- Marci Collier Overstreet, city councilmember from the 11th district (2018–present)

=== Declined ===
- Doug Shipman, incumbent president

== General election ==
Malhotra was characterized as a progressive outsider, while Overstreet is generally considered an insider establishment candidate. In a debate, Overstreet described Malhotra's nonprofit business a crumbling failure. Malhotra responded by claiming Overstreet did not take her job seriously, as she had spent time in city council meetings taking selfies with other councilmembers.

=== Endorsements ===
Rohit Malhotra

U.S. representatives

- Ro Khanna, CA-17 (2017–present)

Local officials

- Felicia Moore, former city council president (2018–2022)
- Cathy Woolard, former city council president (2002–2004)

Labor unions

- Service Employees International Union Southern Region

Organizations

- Georgia Conservation Voters
- Run for Something
- Indivisible Atlanta

Political parties

- Georgia Working Families Party
Marci Collier Overstreet

U.S. representatives

- Lucy McBath, GA-6 (2019–present)

State legislators

- Nan Orrock, state senator from the 36th district (2007–present)

Local officials

- Byron Amos, city councilmember from the 2nd district (2022–present)
- Andre Dickens, mayor of Atlanta (2022–present)
- Mary Norwood, city councilmember from the 8th district (2022–present) (Note: Norwood also served as city councilmember from the at-large district from 2002–2010 and 2014–2018)
- Alex Wan, city councilmember from the 6th district (2010–2018, 2022–present)
- Matt Westmoreland, city councilmember from the at-large district (2017–present)
- Jason Winston, city councilmember from the 1st district (2022–present)

Labor unions

- International Association of Firefighters Local 134
- American Federation of State, County and Municipal Employees Local 1644

=== Results ===
2025 Atlanta City Council presidential election
Candidate	Votes	%
Marci Collier Overstreet	52,389	51.36
Rohit Malhotra	49,617	48.64
Total votes	102,006	100.00
