= Jacquelyn Barrett =

African-American sheriff (born 1950)

- Born: Jacquelyn Harrison; November 4, 1950 (age 75); Charlotte, North Carolina
- Other names: Jackie Barrett; Jackie Washington-Barrett; Jackie Barrett-Washington; Jacquelyn Harrison Barrett
- Education: Atlanta University
- Known for: First African American female elected to be Sheriff in the United States
- Spouse: Gene Washington
- Police career
- Department: Fulton County Sheriff's Department
- Service years: 1992-2004
- Status: Retired
- Awards: Legacy Award from Fulton County Sheriff's Office

Jacquelyn Harrison Barrett (born November 4, 1950) served three terms as sheriff of Fulton County, Georgia, making her the first African-American woman to ever receive the title in the United States. After a "reverse discrimination" lawsuit was filed against her by 18 deputy sheriffs, Barrett was suspended from office by Governor Sonny Perdue in 2004. She did not run for a fourth term.

== Early life and education ==
Jacquelyn Harrison was born November 4, 1950 in Charlotte, North Carolina to Cornelius Harrison and Ocie (Perry) Harrison. In 1972, she graduated from Beaver College, now called Arcadia University, with a bachelor's degree in sociology, with a concentration in criminology. In 1973, she received her master's degree in Criminology from Atlanta University.

== Early career ==
Before being elected sheriff of Fulton County, Barrett served a 10-year tenure as a curriculum specialist for the Georgia Peace Officer Standards and Training Council. She helped to develop programs that would be used to train police officers, and was eventually promoted to create these programs for the Chief of Police and sheriff. She then served two years as chief administrative officer for the Fulton County Sheriff's Office, and became the director of the Fulton County Public Safety Training Center in 1987.

== Career as Sheriff ==
In 1992, Barrett defeated both her Democratic Primary Election opponent Robert McMichaels, and her General Election opponent Morris Chappell (Republican). As sheriff, Barrett managed the largest sheriff's department in Georgia, opened the South Fulton Precinct, recruited seventy-five volunteers to support various charitable organizations, and provided safety training to senior citizens. During the Summer Olympics in Atlanta Barrett served as Sheriff and provided police support for the games.

In 2000, Barrett attended the Democratic National Convention, where she was interviewed by Lou Waters for CNN. She served on the Georgia Congressional Delegation and voiced her support for Al Gore. Barrett completed a second term as Sheriff, and continued to work through a third until she was suspended from office by Governor Sonny Perdue in August 2004. Barrett's final term as Fulton County's Sheriff ended on December 31, 2004.

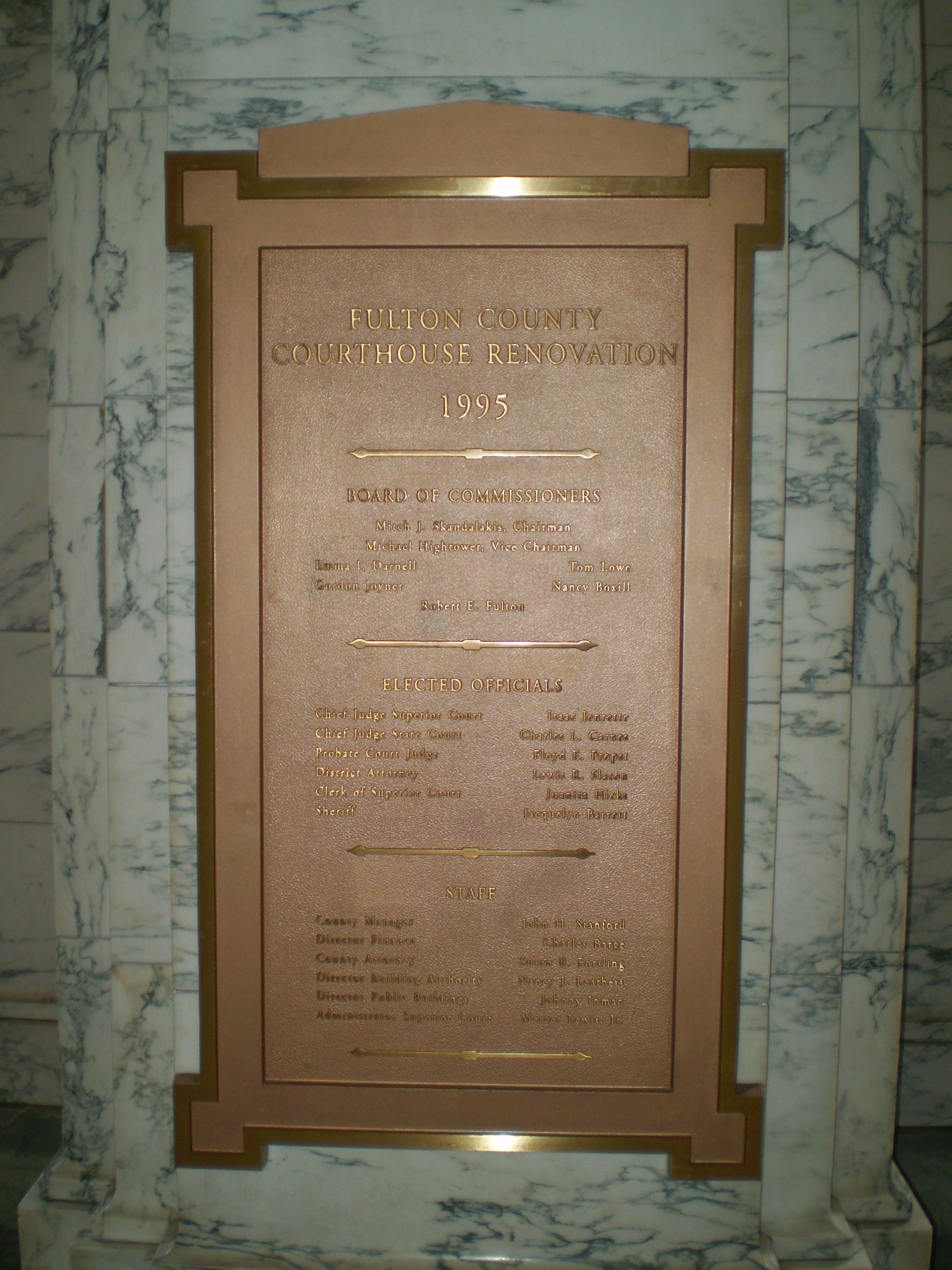
A sign posted for the 1995 Fulton County Courthouse Renovation during Barrett's tenure as sheriff with her name displayed.

== Controversy ==
In 2000, Barrett was called to court for several claims of racial discrimination brought forward by eighteen Fulton County Sheriff's Department employees. Of those eighteen claims, fourteen were found legitimate. Several of these officers were provided compensation for damages to their careers, and some were provided with forced promotions. The remaining four were not found to be discriminated against.

In 2006, a civil action suit was filed by an inmate alleging insufficient living conditions within the Fulton County Jail against Barrett and Fulton County. The Plaintiff stated to the court that he was not provided a properly ventilated cell, and that the food provided did not align with his prescribed diet. The court denied Barrett's request for summary judgement. Additionally, the Plaintiff's claim for prospective relief, and the Plaintiff's punitive-damages claims against Fulton County, and the Plaintiff's official-capacity claims against all former, current, or future sheriff of Fulton County were all denied.

In March 2004, rapper T.I. produced a music video inside of the Fulton County Jail while serving time. The music video was unauthorized by Sheriff Barrett, and the employees who allegedly allowed a small camera crew inside of the jail were terminated.

== Life after law enforcement ==
In 2008, Barrett began teaching criminology as an adjunct professor at the University of West Georgia and at Spelman College. In 2012, it was reported that she also taught at the Fulton Leadership Academy, and focused on STEM programs for young boys. In March 2021, she received a Legacy Award from the Fulton County Sheriff's Office for her lifetime of contributions.

== Personal life ==
Jacquelyn H. Barrett became Jackie Barrett-Washington when she married Gene Washington. She has two children, Kimberly and Alan, and five grandchildren. Barrett is a Christian and belongs to Cascade United Methodist Church.

== Works cited ==
- "Atlanta Area Expected to Elect Black Woman Sheriff". The Seattle Times. August 30, 1992.
- Cook, Rhonda (February 6, 2012). "'Semi-Retired', she now teaches". The Atlanta Constitution.
- "Democratic National Convention: Sheriff Jackie Barrett Discusses Shattering Stereotypes". CNN. August 14, 2004.
- "Women's History Month Celebration". Facebook. Fulton County Sheriff's Office. March 28, 2021.
- Hart, Ariel (July 24, 2004). "County Sheriff Is Suspended in Georgia". The New York Times.
- Hornsby-Gutting, Angela (September 17, 2007). "Jaqueline Harrison Barrett (1950-)". BlackPast.org.
- "Jacquelyn H. Barrett Papers". University Libraries. University of Georgia.
- Patel, Joseph (July 9, 2004). "T.I. Video Fallout Continues as Control of Jail is Wrestled from Sheriff". MTV. Archived from the original on January 10, 2016.
- Whetstone, Muriel L. (August 1, 1995). "The nation's first black woman sheriff: Jackie Barrett". Ebony.
