= Serenbe =

Neighborhood in Georgia, United States

Coordinates: 33°31′30″N 84°44′16″W

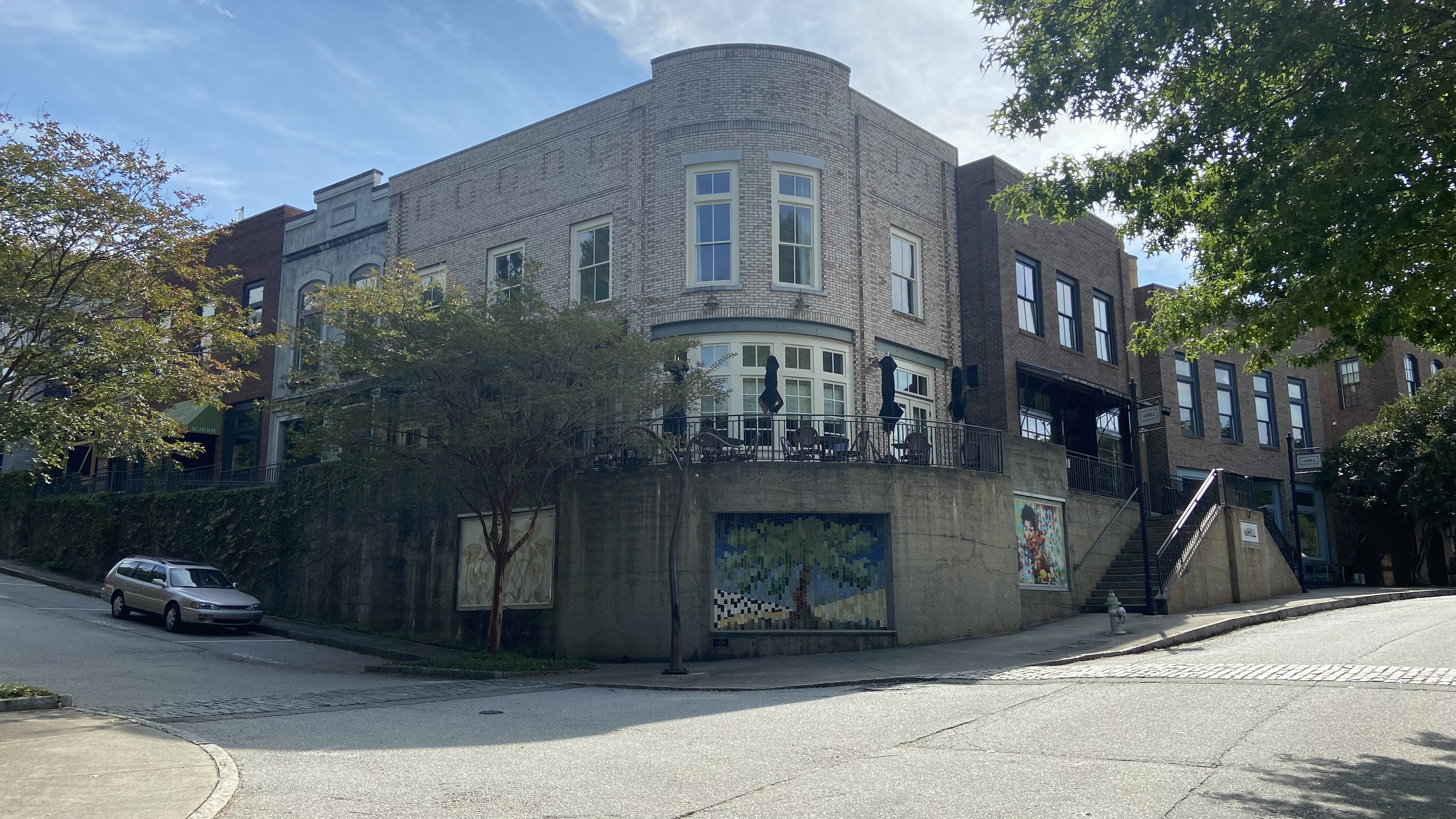
Hill Restaurant and other businesses in Serenbe

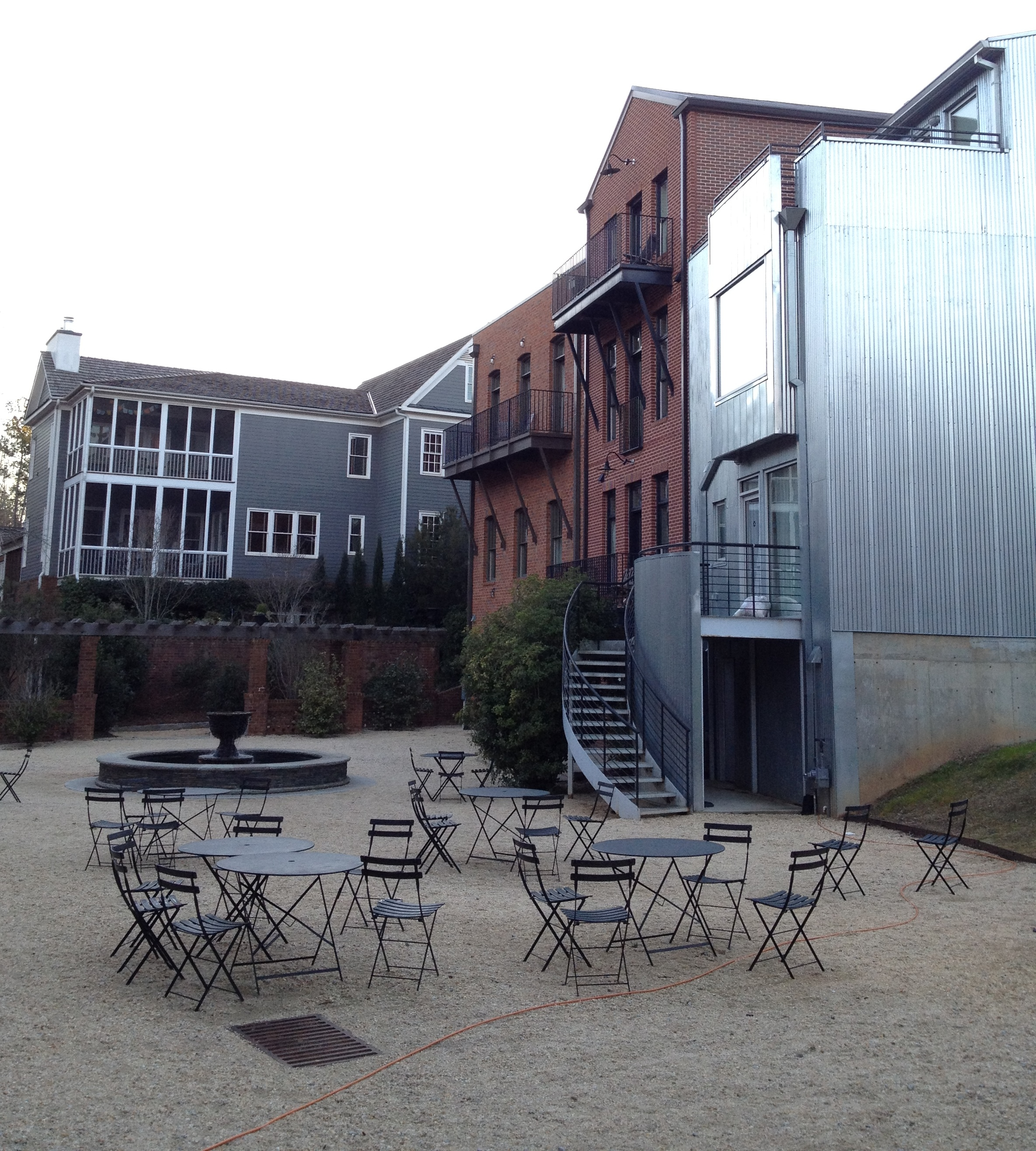
Courtyard in Serenbe

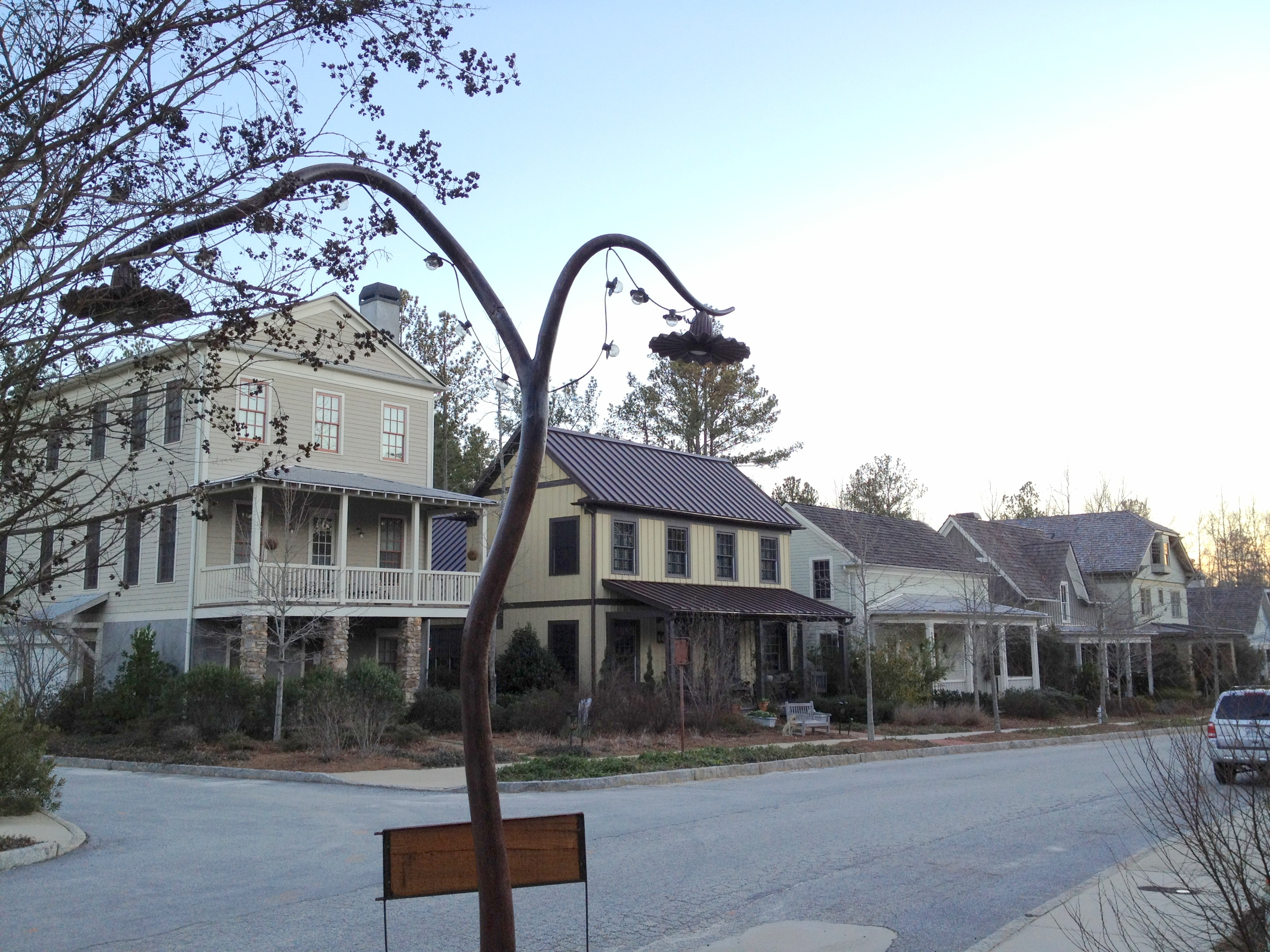
Houses in Serenbe

Serenbe is a neighborhood within the city limits of Chattahoochee Hills, Georgia, United States. Serenbe is an example of New Urbanism.

Steve Nygren, who had previously opened a Bed & Breakfast in the area, developed Serenbe. The name "Serenbe" was his wife Marie's idea, and refers to the location's serenity. The name is a portmanteau of "serenity" and "to be".

Serenbe's residences consist of single-family houses and row houses. All have front porches but no backyards; they face a common greenspace and trails. Proximity to shops and services encourages walking. Architectural styles include Arts and Crafts-style cottages, loft-style townhouses and sleek modern "boxes".

The village comprises three hamlets. The Selborne hamlet is devoted to the visual and culinary arts and currently contains Serenbe's retail shops. The Grange hamlet has an agricultural theme, and the Mado hamlet focuses on health and healing.

In the 1990s, Steve and Marie Nygren visited an organic farm, and this is when they developed a vision to create an entirely sustainable community that was just outside of Atlanta. Part of their goal was to protect the wetlands and natural landscape of the Chattahoochee Hills area. The first residential home was sold in 2005, and there are now over 800 residents living at Serenbe.

Serenbe is an example of an urban village, and 70% of its land is protected from development. Nygren was inspired by principles of New Urbanism and applied that to his town design, with walkability and shared green spaces and a variety of houses and buildings.

The layout of Serenbe is designed to make efficient use of space, and it has 20% more housing per square mile than other suburbs.

Serenbe has received criticism for being a bubble outside of Atlanta, with high-end goods and homes that on average cost more than a million dollars.
