= Fulton County, Georgia =

County in Georgia, United States

Fulton County
- County
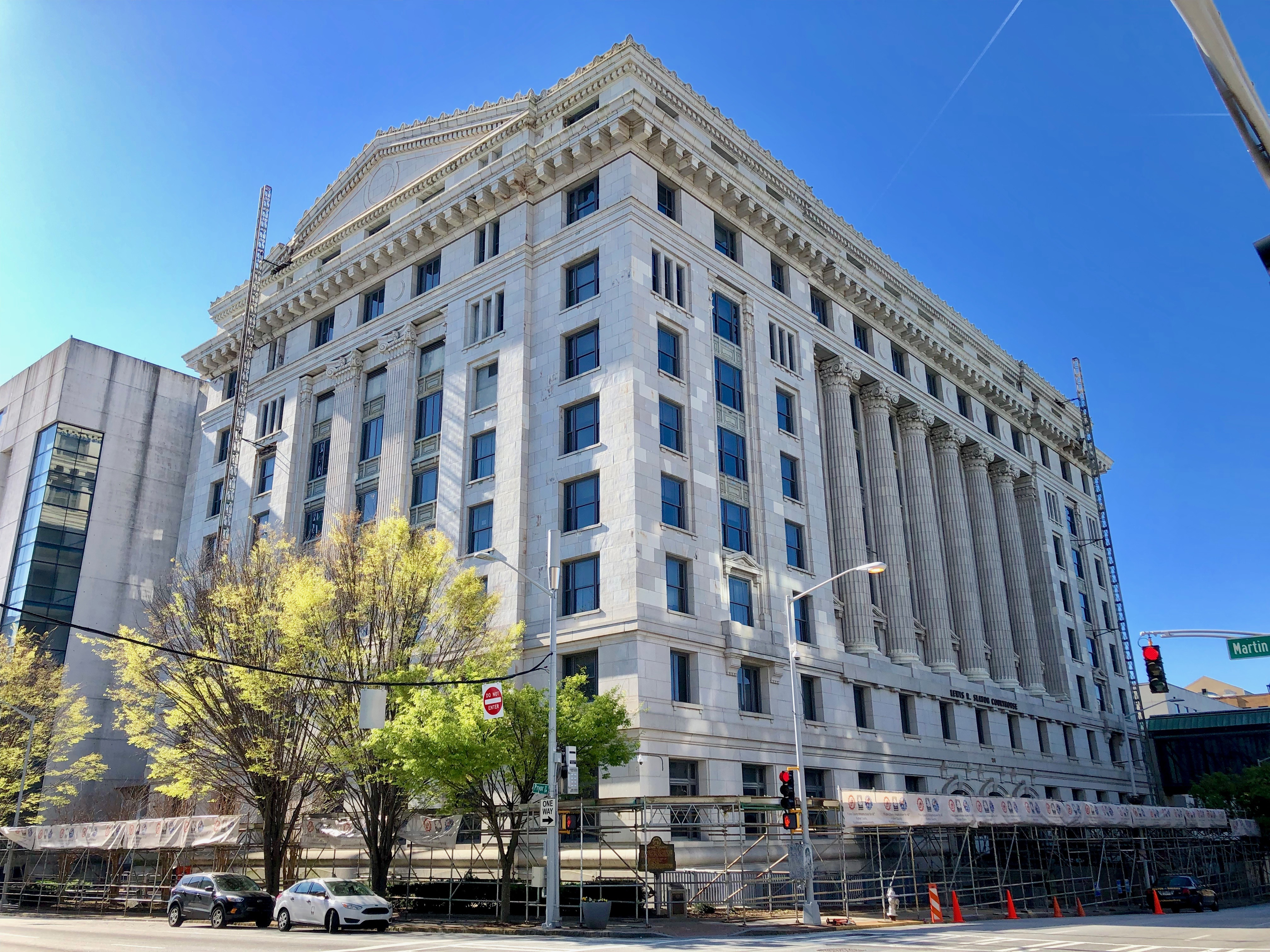
- Atlanta's Fulton County Courthouse in 2019

- Flag Logo

- Location in Georgia
- Coordinates: 33.79°N 84.47°W
- Country: United States
- State: Georgia
- Region: Atlanta metropolitan area
- Founded: December 20, 1853; 172 years ago
- Named for: Robert Fulton
- County seat: Atlanta
- Largest city: Atlanta

Government
  - Type: Commission–manager
  - Body: Board of Commissioners: Bridget Thorne (R); Bob Ellis (R); Dana Barrett (D); Vacant; Marvin S. Arrington Jr. (D); Khadijah Abdur-Rahman (D)
  - Chairman: Robb Pitts (D)
  - Vice Chair: Khadijah Abdur-Rahman (D)
  - County Manager: Dick Anderson

Area
  - Total: 534 sq mi (1,380 km^{2})
  - Land: 527 sq mi (1,360 km^{2})
  - Water: 7.7 sq mi (20 km^{2}) 1.4%

Population (2020)
  - Total: 1,066,710
  - Estimate (2025): 1,098,791 ▲
  - Density: 2,020/sq mi (782/km^{2})
- Time zone: UTC−5 (Eastern Time Zone)
  - Summer (DST): UTC−4 (Eastern Daylight Time)
- Congressional districts: 5th, 6th, 7th
- Website: fultoncountyga.gov

Fulton County is in the north-central portion of the U.S. state of Georgia. As of the 2020 United States census, the population was 1,066,710, making it the state's most populous county. Its county seat and most populous city is Atlanta, the state capital. About 90% of the city of Atlanta is within Fulton County; the remaining portion is in DeKalb County. Fulton County is the principal county of the Atlanta–Sandy Springs–Roswell metropolitan statistical area.

== History ==
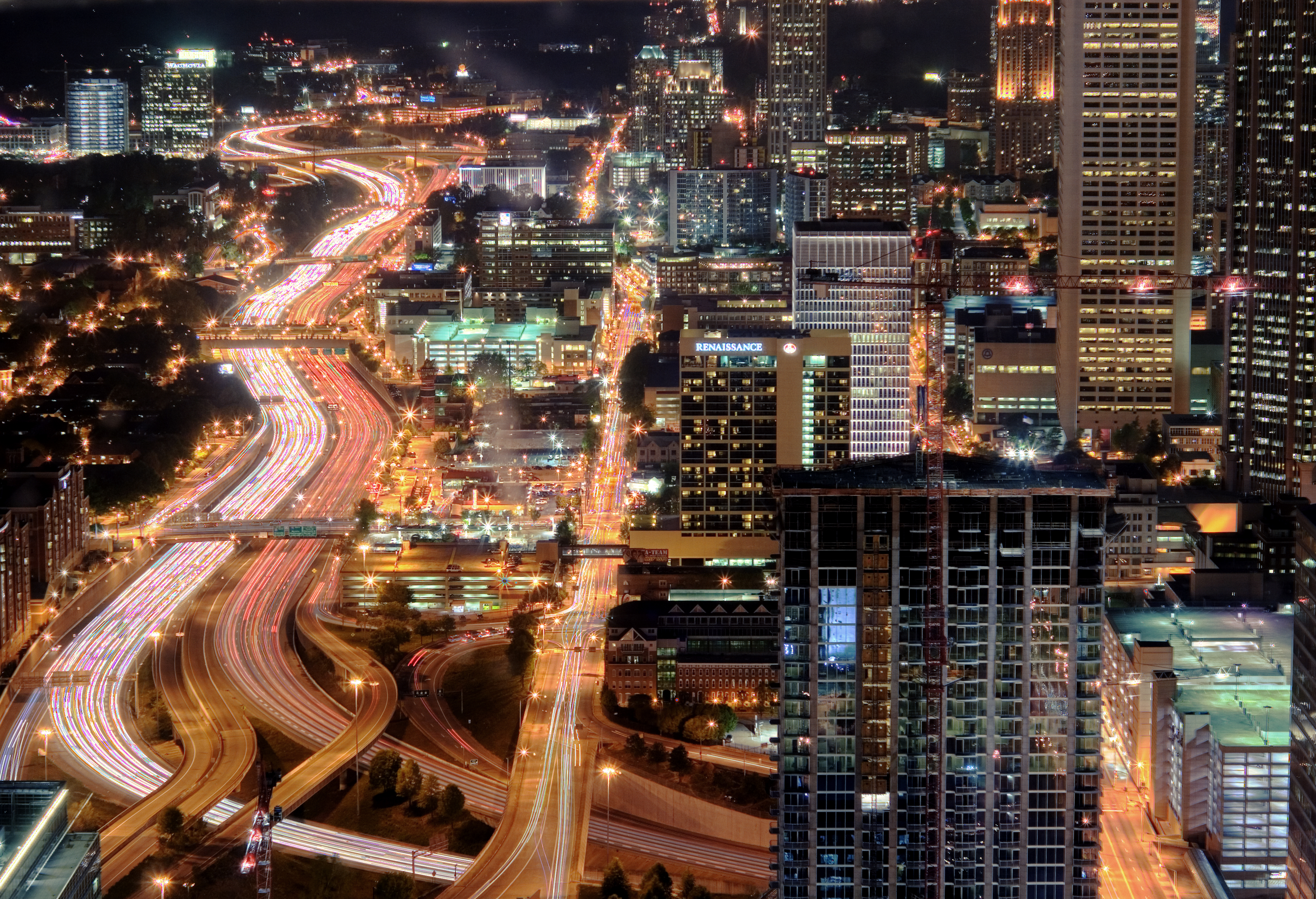
Midtown Atlanta and the Downtown Connector

Fulton County was created in 1853 from the western half of DeKalb County. It was named in honor of Robert Fulton, the man who created the first commercially successful steamboat in 1807.

After the American Civil War, there was considerable violence against freedmen in the county. During the post-Reconstruction period, violence and the number of lynchings of blacks increased in the late 19th century, as whites exercised terrorism to re-establish and maintain white supremacy. Whites lynched 35 African Americans here from 1877 to 1950; according to the Georgia Lynching Project, 24 were killed in 1906. This was the highest total in the state. With a total of 589, Georgia was second to Mississippi in its total number of lynchings in this period.

In addition to individual lynchings, during the 1906 Atlanta race massacre, whites killed at least 25 African Americans; the number may have been considerably higher. Two white persons died during the riot; one a woman who died of a heart attack. The violence affected black residential and business development in the city afterward. The Georgia legislature effectively completed disenfranchisement of African Americans in 1908, with constitutional amendments that raised barriers to voter registration and voting, excluding them from the political system.

At the beginning of 1932, as an austerity measure to save money during the Great Depression, Fulton County annexed Milton County to the north and Campbell County to the southwest, to centralize administration. That resulted in the current long shape of the county along 80 miles (130 km) of the Chattahoochee River. On May 9 of that year, neighboring Cobb County ceded the city of Roswell and lands lying east of Willeo Creek to Fulton County so that it would be more contiguous with the lands ceded from Milton County.

In the second half of the 20th century, Atlanta and Fulton County became the location of numerous national and international headquarters for leading companies, attracting highly skilled employees from around the country. This led to the city and county becoming more cosmopolitan and diverse.

In 1992, Fulton County elected the first African-American woman, Jacquelyn Harrison Barrett, to the position of Sheriff in the history of the United States.

In 2023, rapper Playboi Carti was arrested in Fulton County. That same year, Donald Trump and 18 co-defendants were indicted by Fulton County district attorney Fani Willis. As of 2025, the prosecution is being continued by Pete Skandalakis. Fulton County was a centerpoint in Donald Trump's attempts to overturn the 2020 United States presidential election in Georgia; in January 2026, the FBI conducted a raid on the county's election office.

== Geography ==
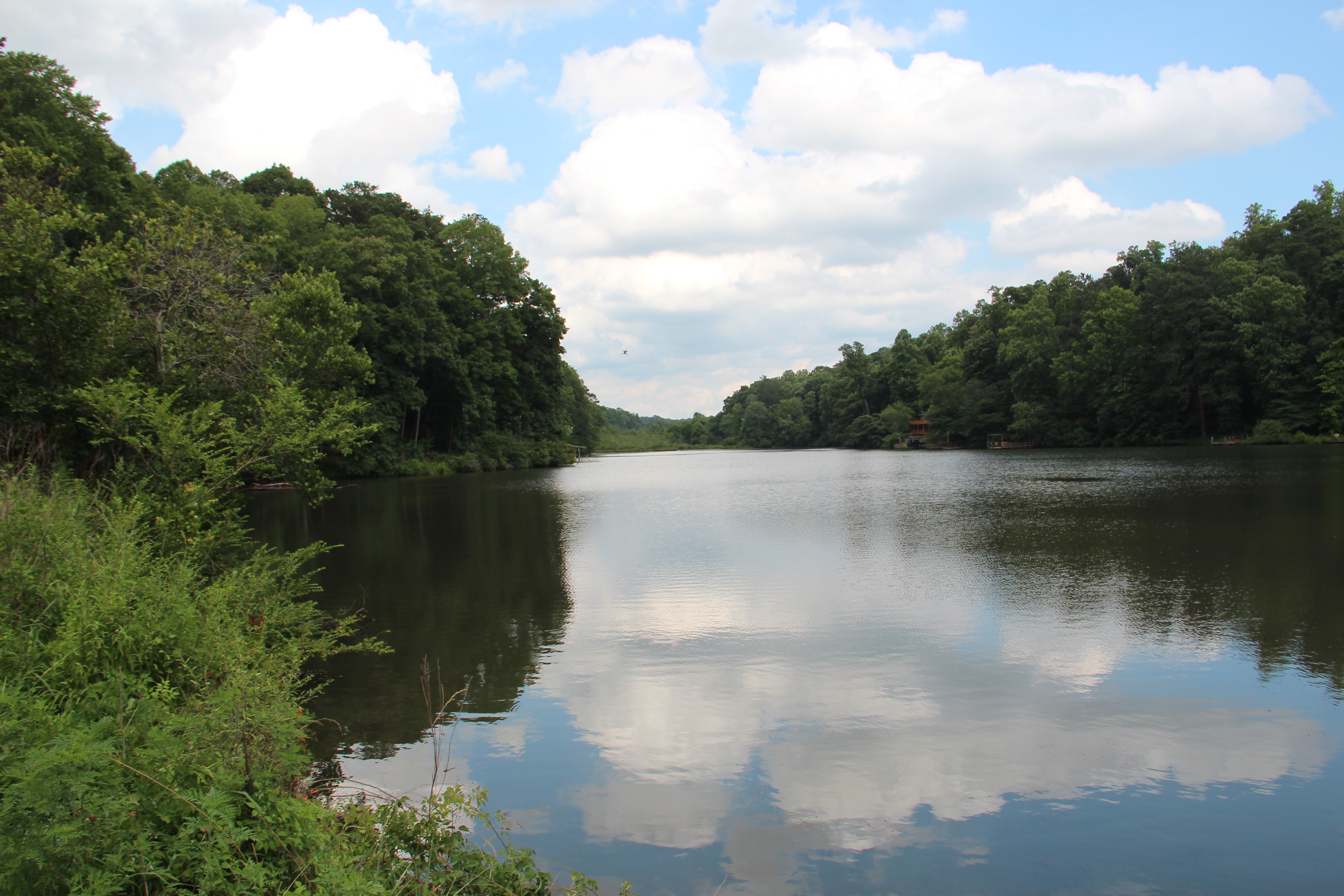
Garrett Lake, Mountain Park

According to the U.S. Census Bureau, the county has a total area of 534 square miles (1,380 km^{2}), of which 527 square miles (1,360 km^{2}) is land and 7.7 square miles (20 km^{2}) (1.4%) is water. The county is located in the Piedmont region of the state in the foothills of the Blue Ridge Mountains to the north. The shape of the county resembles a sword with its handle at the northeastern part, and the tip at the southwestern portion.

Going from north to south, the northernmost portion of Fulton County, encompassing Milton and northern Alpharetta, is located in the Etowah River sub-basin of the ACT River Basin (Alabama-Coosa-Tallapoosa River Basin). The rest of north and central Fulton, to downtown Atlanta, is located in the Upper Chattahoochee River sub-basin of the ACF River Basin (Apalachicola-Chattahoochee-Flint River Basin). The bulk of south Fulton County, from Atlanta to Palmetto, is located in the Middle Chattahoochee River-Lake Harding sub-basin of the larger ACF River Basin, with just the eastern edges of south Fulton, from Palmetto northeast through Union Hill to Hapeville, in the Upper Flint River sub-basin of the same larger ACF River Basin.

=== Adjacent counties ===
- Cherokee County – northwest
- Forsyth County – northeast
- Gwinnett County – east
- DeKalb County – east
- Clayton County – south
- Fayette County – south
- Coweta County – southwest
- Carroll County – west
- Douglas County – west
- Cobb County – west

=== National protected areas ===
- Chattahoochee River National Recreation Area (part)
- Martin Luther King, Jr. National Historic Site

== Communities ==
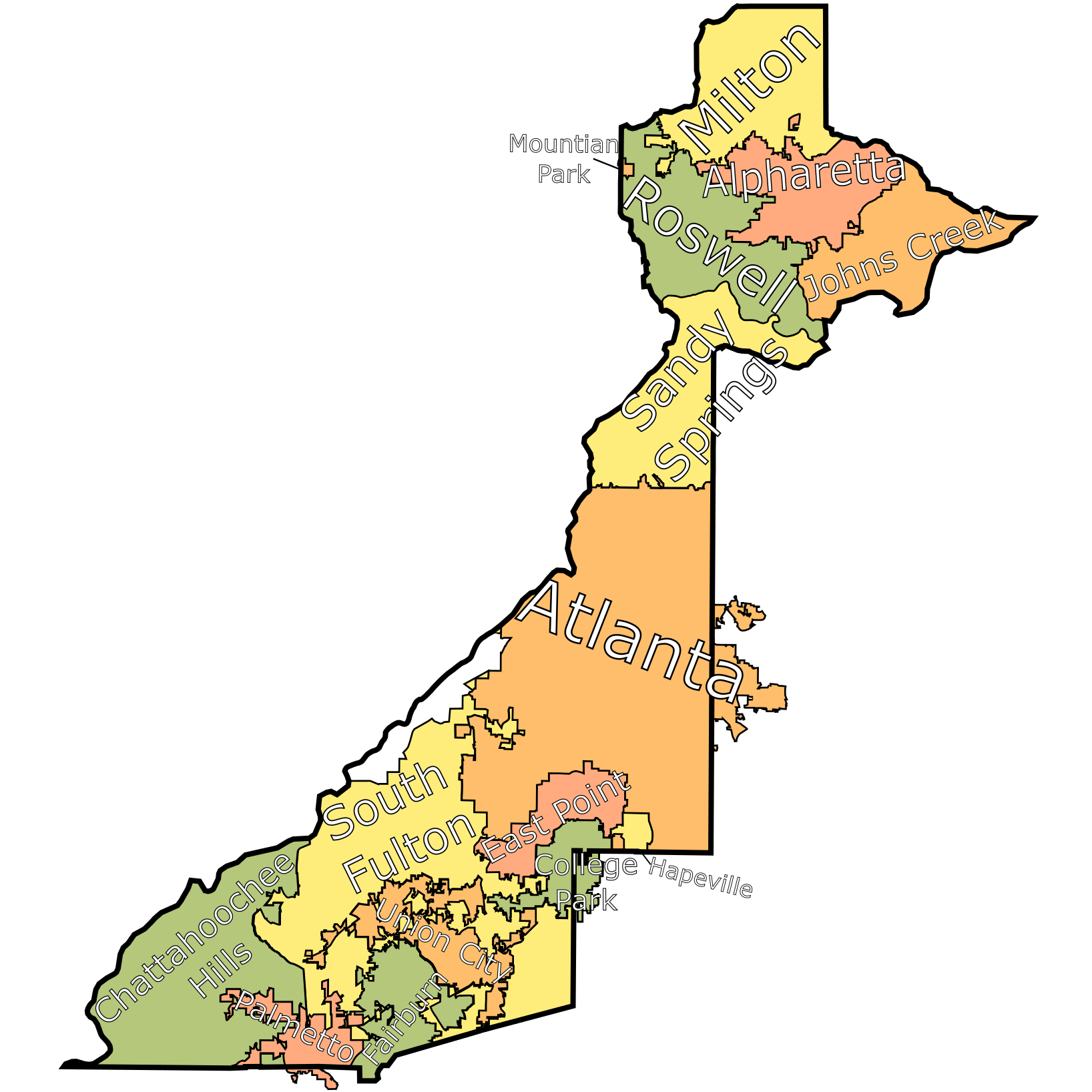
A map of all the cities within Fulton County, Georgia

There are 15 cities within Fulton County. Four cities include land outside of the county (Atlanta, College Park, Palmetto, and Mountain Park) but still have their center of government and the majority of their land within Fulton County. After the formation of South Fulton in 2017, the only unincorporated part of the county is Fulton Industrial Boulevard, from roughly Fulton Brown Airport (Brown's Field) down to Fairburn Rd. (concurrent with GA-158 and GA-166) This led to Fulton County becoming the first county in Georgia to suspend all city services.

=== Cities ===
- Alpharetta
- Atlanta
- Chattahoochee Hills
- College Park
- East Point
- Fairburn
- Hapeville
- Johns Creek
- Milton
- Mountain Park
- Palmetto
- Roswell
- Sandy Springs
- South Fulton
- Union City

=== Former unincorporated communities ===
- Campbellton (now within South Fulton)
- Ocee (now within Johns Creek)
- Red Oak (now within South Fulton)
- Sandtown (now within South Fulton)
- Serenbe (village within Chattahoochee Hills)
- Shake Rag (within Johns Creek)

== Demographics ==
Historical population
Census	Pop.	Note	%±
1860	14,427		—
1870	33,446		131.8%
1880	49,137		46.9%
1890	84,655		72.3%
1900	117,363		38.6%
1910	177,733		51.4%
1920	232,606		30.9%
1930	318,587		37.0%
1940	392,886		23.3%
1950	473,572		20.5%
1960	556,326		17.5%
1970	607,592		9.2%
1980	589,904		−2.9%
1990	648,951		10.0%
2000	816,006		25.7%
2010	920,581		12.8%
2020	1,066,710		15.9%
2025 (est.)	1,098,791	▲	3.0%
U.S. Decennial Census; 1790-1880 1890-1910; 1920-1930 1930-1940; 1940-1950 1960-1980; 1980-2000 2010 2020

=== 2020 census ===
Fulton County, Georgia – Racial and ethnic composition Note: the US Census treats Hispanic/Latino as an ethnic category. This table excludes Latinos from the racial categories and assigns them to a separate category. Hispanics/Latinos may be of any race.
Race / ethnicity (NH = Non-Hispanic)	Pop 1980	Pop 1990	Pop 2000	Pop 2010	Pop 2020	% 1980	% 1990	% 2000	% 2010	% 2020
White alone (NH)	276,418	303,724	369,997	376,014	404,793	46.86%	46.80%	45.34%	40.85%	37.95%
Black or African American alone (NH)	300,952	322,428	361,018	400,457	448,803	51.02%	49.68%	44.24%	43.50%	42.07%
Native American or Alaska Native alone (NH)	644	904	1,148	1,586	1,558	0.11%	0.14%	0.14%	0.17%	0.15%
Asian alone (NH)	2,926	8,221	24,635	51,304	80,632	0.50%	1.27%	3.02%	5.57%	7.56%
Native Hawaiian or Pacific Islander alone (NH)	x	x	261	287	381	x	x	0.03%	0.03%	0.04%
Other race alone (NH)	1,390	301	1,599	2,582	6,444	0.24%	0.05%	0.20%	0.28%	0.60%
Mixed race or Multiracial (NH)	x	x	9,292	15,785	37,797	x	x	1.14%	1.71%	3.54%
Hispanic or Latino (any race)	7,574	13,373	48,056	72,566	86,302	1.28%	2.06%	5.89%	7.88%	8.09%
Total	589,904	648,951	816,006	920,581	1,066,710	100.00%	100.00%	100.00%	100.00%	100.00%

Racial / ethnic Profile of places in Fulton County, Georgia (2020 Census)
Following is a table of cities, villages, and census designated places in Fulton County, Georgia. Data for the United States (with and without Puerto Rico), the state of Georgia, and Fulton County itself have been included for comparison purposes.
The majority racial/ethnic group is coded per the key below. Communities that extend into and adjacent county or counties are delineated with a ‡ followed by an accompanying explanatory note. The full population of each community has been tabulated including the population in adjacent counties.

Majority minority with no dominant group
Majority White
Majority Black
Majority Hispanic
Majority Asian

Racial and ethnic composition of places in Fulton County (2020 Census) (NH = Non-Hispanic) Note: the US Census treats Hispanic/Latino as an ethnic category. This table excludes Latinos from the racial categories and assigns them to a separate category. Hispanics/Latinos may be of any race.
Place	Designation	Total Population	White alone (NH)	%	Black or African American alone (NH)	%	Native American or Alaska Native alone (NH)	%	Asian alone (NH)	%	Pacific Islander alone (NH)	%	Other race alone (NH)	%	Mixed race or Multiracial (NH)	%	Hispanic or Latino (any race)	%
United States of America (50 states and D.C.)	x	331,449,281	191,697,647	57.84%	39,940,338	12.05%	2,251,699	0.68%	19,618,719	5.92%	622,018	0.19%	1,689,833	0.51%	13,548,983	4.09%	62,080,044	18.73%
United States of America (50 states, D.C., and Puerto Rico)	x	334,735,155	191,722,195	57.28%	39,944,624	11.93%	2,252,011	0.67%	19,621,465	5.86%	622,109	0.19%	1,692,341	0.51%	13,551,323	4.05%	65,329,087	19.52%
Georgia	State	10,711,908	5,362,156	50.06%	3,278,119	30.60%	20,375	0.19%	475,680	4.44%	6,101	0.06%	55,887	0.52%	390,133	3.64%	1,123,457	10.49%
Fulton County	County	1,066,710	404,793	37.95%	448,803	42.07%	1,558	0.15%	80,632	7.56%	381	0.04%	6,444	0.60%	37,797	3.54%	86,302	8.09%
Alpharetta	City	65,818	36,473	55.41%	6,667	10.13%	101	0.15%	13,181	20.03%	22	0.03%	538	0.82%	2,716	4.13%	6,120	9.30%
Atlanta ‡	City	498,715	192,148	38.53%	233,018	46.72%	767	0.15%	22,208	4.45%	171	0.03%	2,493	0.50%	17,922	3.59%	29,988	6.01%
Chattahoochee Hills	City	2,950	2,026	68.68%	647	21.93%	5	0.17%	7	0.24%	0	0.00%	13	0.44%	99	3.36%	153	5.19%
College Park ‡	City	13,930	1,528	10.97%	11,017	79.09%	31	0.22%	116	0.83%	2	0.01%	90	0.65%	359	2.58%	787	5.65%
East Point	City	38,358	3,527	9.19%	29,156	76.01%	74	0.19%	250	0.65%	11	0.03%	211	0.55%	359	0.94%	4,044	10.54%
Fairburn	City	16,483	1,540	9.34%	12,601	76.45%	16	0.10%	220	1.33%	4	0.02%	71	0.43%	383	2.32%	1,648	10.00%
Hapeville	City	6,553	1,574	24.02%	2,339	35.69%	24	0.37%	262	4.00%	3	0.05%	57	0.87%	228	3.48%	2,066	31.53%
Johns Creek	City	82,453	39,483	47.89%	8,528	10.34%	73	0.09%	24,603	29.84%	38	0.05%	524	0.64%	3,414	4.14%	5,790	7.02%
Milton	City	41,296	25,802	62.48%	3,882	9.40%	74	0.18%	6,446	15.61%	10	0.02%	247	0.60%	1,821	4.41%	3,014	7.30%
Mountain Park ‡	City	583	475	81.48%	10	1.72%	2	0.34%	14	2.40%	0	0.00%	2	0.34%	47	8.06%	33	5.66%
Palmetto ‡	City	5,071	1,203	23.72%	2,949	58.15%	9	0.18%	43	0.85%	1	0.02%	25	0.49%	180	3.55%	661	13.03%
Roswell	City	92,833	58,745	63.28%	10,694	11.52%	87	0.09%	4,626	4.98%	31	0.03%	707	0.76%	3,853	4.15%	14,090	15.18%
Sandy Springs	City	108,080	58,130	53.78%	19,773	18.29%	137	0.13%	10,160	9.40%	56	0.05%	806	0.75%	4,278	3.96%	14,740	13.64%
South Fulton	City	107,436	3,402	3.17%	96,463	89.79%	148	0.14%	459	0.43%	33	0.03%	729	0.68%	2,674	2.49%	3,528	3.28%
Union City	City	26,830	1,220	4.55%	22,686	84.55%	51	0.19%	135	0.50%	12	0.04%	147	0.55%	586	2.18%	1,993	7.43%

As of the 2020 census, the county had a population of 1,066,710 people, 448,577 households, and 238,444 families residing there, reflecting the county's historically positive population growth with the exception of the 1980 U.S. census.

The median age was 35.5 years; 20.6% of residents were under the age of 18 and 12.3% of residents were 65 years of age or older. For every 100 females there were 93.8 males, and for every 100 females age 18 and over there were 91.6 males age 18 and over. 99.4% of residents lived in urban areas, while 0.6% lived in rural areas.

The racial makeup of the county, as recorded in the 2020 census, was 39.3% White, 42.5% Black or African American, 0.3% American Indian and Alaska Native, 7.6% Asian, 0.0% Native Hawaiian and Pacific Islander, 3.6% from some other race, and 6.6% from two or more races; Hispanic or Latino residents of any race comprised 8.1% of the population.

There were 448,577 households in the county, of which 26.8% had children under the age of 18 living with them and 35.2% had a female householder with no spouse or partner present. About 36.2% of all households were made up of individuals and 8.9% had someone living alone who was 65 years of age or older.

There were 494,006 housing units, of which 9.2% were vacant. Among occupied housing units, 50.0% were owner-occupied and 50.0% were renter-occupied. The homeowner vacancy rate was 2.2% and the rental vacancy rate was 9.3%.

=== 2010 census ===
In 2010, its racial and ethnic makeup was 43.50% Black or African American, 40.85% non-Hispanic white, 0.17% American Indian and Alaska Native, 5.57% Asian, 0.03% Pacific Islander, 0.28% some other race, 1.71% multiracial, and 7.88% Hispanic or Latino of any race.

In 2010, the median income for a household in the county was $56,709 and the median income for a family was $75,579. Males had a median income of $56,439 versus $42,697 for females. The per capita income for the county was $37,211. About 12.0% of families and 15.3% of the population were below the poverty line, including 22.0% of those under age 18 and 12.0% of those age 65 or over.

=== 2022 American Community Survey ===
At the 2022 American Community Survey, its median household income grew to $90,346 with a per capita income of $59,689. Among its population, 53% earned from $50,000 to $200,000 annually, and 28% earned less than $50,000. Approximately 12.7% of the county lived at or below the poverty line.

== Economy ==
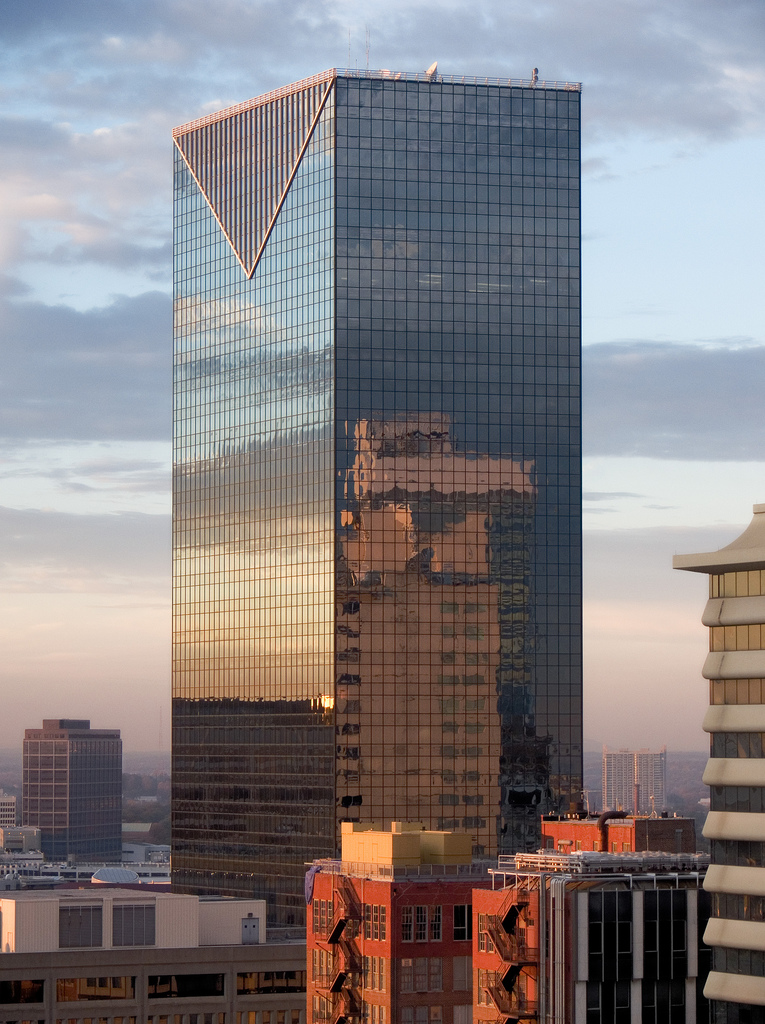
Centennial Tower

Companies headquartered in Fulton County include AFC Enterprises (Popeyes Chicken/Cinnabon), AT&T Mobility, Chick-fil-A, Children's Healthcare of Atlanta, Church's Texas Chicken, The Coca-Cola Company, Cox Enterprises, Delta Air Lines, Earthlink, Equifax, First Data, Georgia-Pacific, Global Payments, Inc., InterContinental Hotels Group, IBM Internet Security Systems, Mirant Corp., Newell Rubbermaid, Northside Hospital, Piedmont Healthcare, Porsche Cars North America, Saint Joseph's Hospital, Southern Company, United Parcel Service, are based in various cities throughout Fulton County.

== Education ==
All portions of Fulton County outside of the city limits of Atlanta are served by the Fulton County School System. All portions within Atlanta are served by Atlanta Public Schools.

=== Libraries ===
==== History ====
The Fulton County Library System began in 1902 as the Carnegie Library of Atlanta, one of the first public libraries in the United States. In 1935, the city of Atlanta and the Fulton County Board of Commissioners signed a contract under which library service was extended to all of Fulton County. Then in 1982, Georgia voters passed a constitutional Amendment authorizing the transfer of responsibility for the Library system from the city of Atlanta to the county. On July 1, 1983, the transfer finally became official, and the system was renamed the Atlanta-Fulton Public Library System. A new Central library was opened in 1988.

== Government and politics ==
Fulton County is governed by a seven-member Board of Commissioners, whose members are elected from single-member districts to staggered four-year terms. The chairman of the board is elected at-large county-wide. The county operates under a county manager system, where an appointed manager handles day-to-day administrative operations. As the most populous county in Georgia, its adopted budget for fiscal year 2026 is $1.42 billion, which funds regional infrastructure, judicial administration, social programs, the Atlanta-Fulton Public Library System, and county-wide public health services. Public safety and county detention are managed by the Fulton County Sheriff's Office, which administers the Fulton County Jail and provides security for the superior court system.

=== Political alignment ===
Fulton County is one of the most reliably Democratic counties in the United States, having voted for the Democratic presidential nominee in every election since 1876, with the exceptions of 1928 and 1972. In the 2020 and 2024 presidential elections, the Democratic nominee secured over 72% of the countywide vote. Federally, the county is split among three congressional districts represented by Democrats Nikema Williams (District 5) and Lucy McBath (District 6), and Republican Rich McCormick (District 7).

United States presidential election results for Fulton County, Georgia
Year	Republican		Democratic		Third party(ies)	
Year	No.	%	No.	%	No.	%
1972	96,256	56.43%	74,329	43.57%	0	0.00%
1976	61,552	32.16%	129,849	67.84%	0	0.00%
1980	64,909	33.68%	118,748	61.62%	9,066	4.70%
1984	95,149	43.11%	125,567	56.89%	0	0.00%
1988	91,785	42.75%	120,752	56.25%	2,152	1.00%
1992	85,451	33.20%	147,459	57.29%	24,499	9.52%
1996	89,809	36.93%	143,306	58.93%	10,053	4.13%
2000	104,870	39.84%	152,039	57.76%	6,303	2.39%
2004	134,372	39.90%	199,436	59.23%	2,933	0.87%
2008	130,136	32.08%	272,000	67.06%	3,489	0.86%
2012	137,124	34.42%	255,470	64.13%	5,752	1.44%
2016	117,783	26.85%	297,051	67.70%	23,917	5.45%
2020	137,247	26.20%	380,212	72.57%	6,472	1.24%
2024	144,655	27.03%	384,752	71.88%	5,831	1.09%

Georgia Gubernatorial election results for Fulton County
Year	Republican		Democratic		Third party(ies)	
Year	No.	%	No.	%	No.	%
1966	78,293	58.74%	37,761	28.33%	17,228	12.93%
1970	91,757	56.07%	71,519	43.70%	366	0.22%
1974	33,107	25.02%	99,036	74.85%	169	0.13%
1978	20,722	22.03%	73,343	77.97%	0	0.00%
1982	56,170	41.23%	80,055	58.77%	0	0.00%
1986	47,377	31.64%	102,358	68.36%	0	0.00%
1990	60,151	39.12%	88,499	57.55%	5,115	3.33%
1994	62,824	38.37%	100,894	61.63%	0	0.00%
1998	70,322	36.69%	114,590	59.79%	6,743	3.52%
2002	70,446	35.00%	125,885	62.54%	4,963	2.47%
2006	82,050	42.85%	100,217	52.34%	9,204	4.81%
2010	90,197	35.18%	156,024	60.85%	10,192	3.97%
2014	92,489	34.81%	168,010	63.24%	5169	1.95%
2018	112,991	26.66%	306,589	72.34%	4,208	0.99%
2022	128,167	30.52%	289,085	68.85%	2,632	0.63%
2026	119,121	26.08%	337,607	73.92%	0	0.00%

=== Municipalization and county division ===
The county's northern and southern regions have historically differed on issues of taxation and municipal service delivery. This disparity catalyzed a continuous "cityhood movement" between 2005 and 2017. Beginning with the incorporation of Sandy Springs in 2005, a subsequent wave of municipalization occurred, resulting in the creation of new cities like Johns Creek, Milton, and ultimately the City of South Fulton in 2017.

Following the 2017 incorporation of South Fulton, the county retained almost no unincorporated territory outside of the industrial corridor along Fulton Industrial Boulevard. As a result, Fulton County became the first county in Georgia to suspend generalized local municipal operations (such as municipal police, firefighting, and zoning), shifting its structural mandate exclusively to countywide regional services like judicial administration, tax assessments, and public health programs.

During the height of the municipalization movement, proponents in suburban North Fulton advocated for secession to re-form historic Milton County, which had been financially absorbed by Fulton in 1932 during the Great Depression. State legislative proposals to allow the division stalled in the General Assembly amid debates regarding the economic and racial equity of splitting the tax base, and the complete incorporation of the county's cities ultimately diminished the momentum for secession.

== Transportation ==
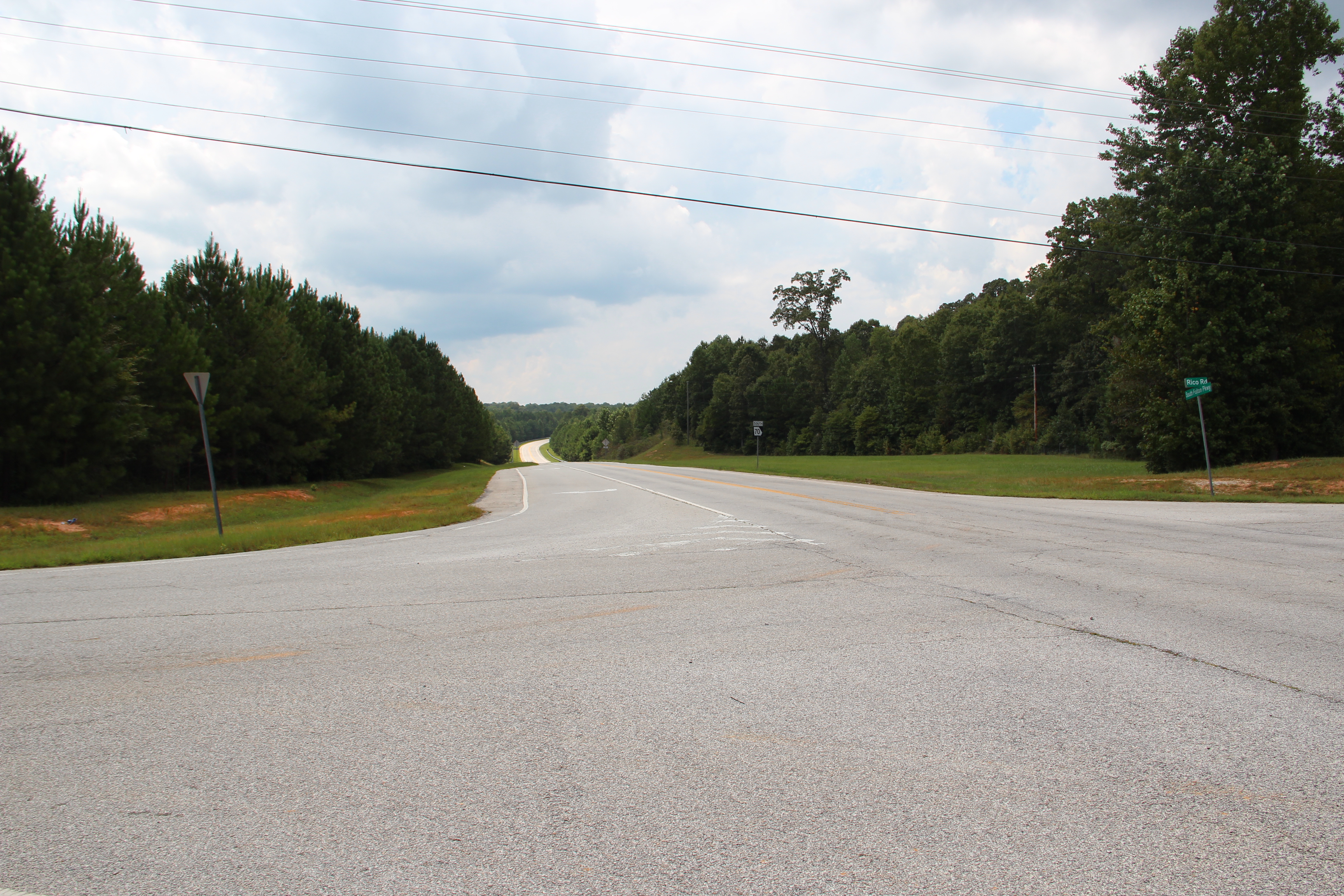
South Fulton Parkway

Almost every major highway, and every major Interstate highway, in metro Atlanta passes through Fulton County. Outside Atlanta proper, Georgia 400 is the major highway through north Fulton, and Interstate 85 to the southwest.

=== Major highways ===
- I-20 / SR 402 (unsigned)
- I-75 / SR 401 (unsigned)
- I-85 / SR 403 (unsigned)
- I-285 / SR 407 (unsigned)
- US 19
- US 23 / SR 42
  - SR 42 Conn. (Atlanta)
  - SR 42 Spur (Atlanta)
- US 29
  - US 29 Alt. (Palmetto)
- US 41 / SR 3
  - SR 3 Conn. (Atlanta)
- US 78 / US 278 / SR 8
- SR 6
- SR 9
- SR 10
- SR 13
- SR 14
  - SR 14 Alt. (Palmetto)
  - SR 14 Conn. (College Park)
- SR 54
  - SR 54 Conn. (Atlanta)
- SR 70
- SR 74
- SR 92
- SR 120
- SR 138
- SR 139
- SR 140
- SR 141
  - SR 141 Conn. (Atlanta)
- SR 154
  - SR 154 Conn. (Atlanta)
- SR 166
- SR 236
- SR 237
- SR 279
- SR 280
- SR 295 (unsigned)
- SR 372
- SR 400

=== Secondary highways ===
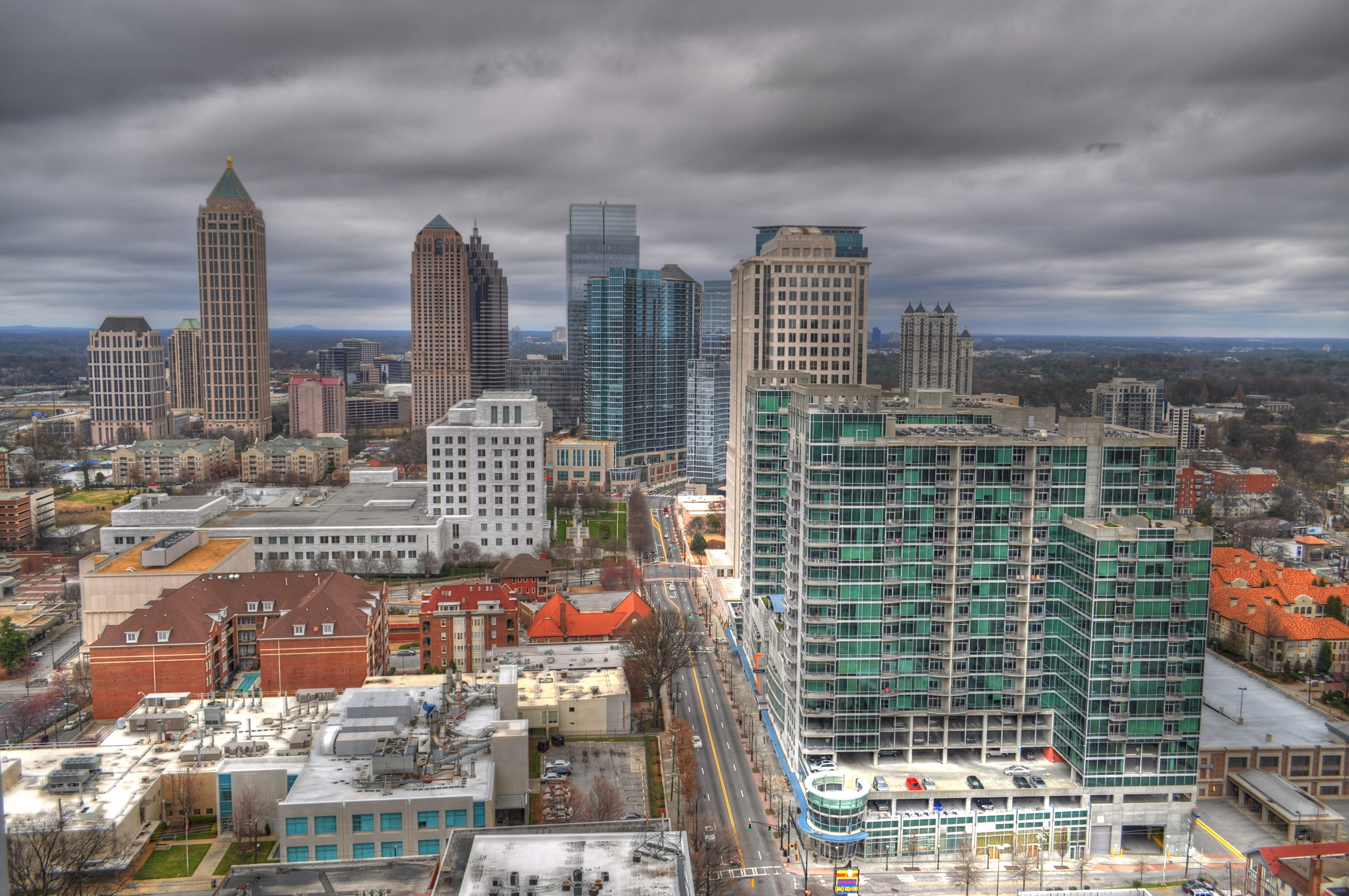
Peachtree Street in Midtown Atlanta

- Abernathy Road
- East Wesley Road
- Freedom Parkway (Georgia 10)
- Glenridge Drive
- Hammond Drive
- Johnson Ferry Road
- Lindbergh Drive (Georgia 236)
- Memorial Drive (Georgia 154)
- Moreland Avenue (U.S. 23/Georgia 42)
- Mount Vernon Highway
- Peachtree Road (Georgia 141)
- Peachtree-Dunwoody Road
- Piedmont Road (Georgia 237)
- Ponce de Leon Avenue (U.S. 23/29/78/278/Georgia 8/10)
- Powers Ferry Road
- Roswell Road (U.S. 19/Georgia 9)
- Windsor Parkway

=== Mass transit ===
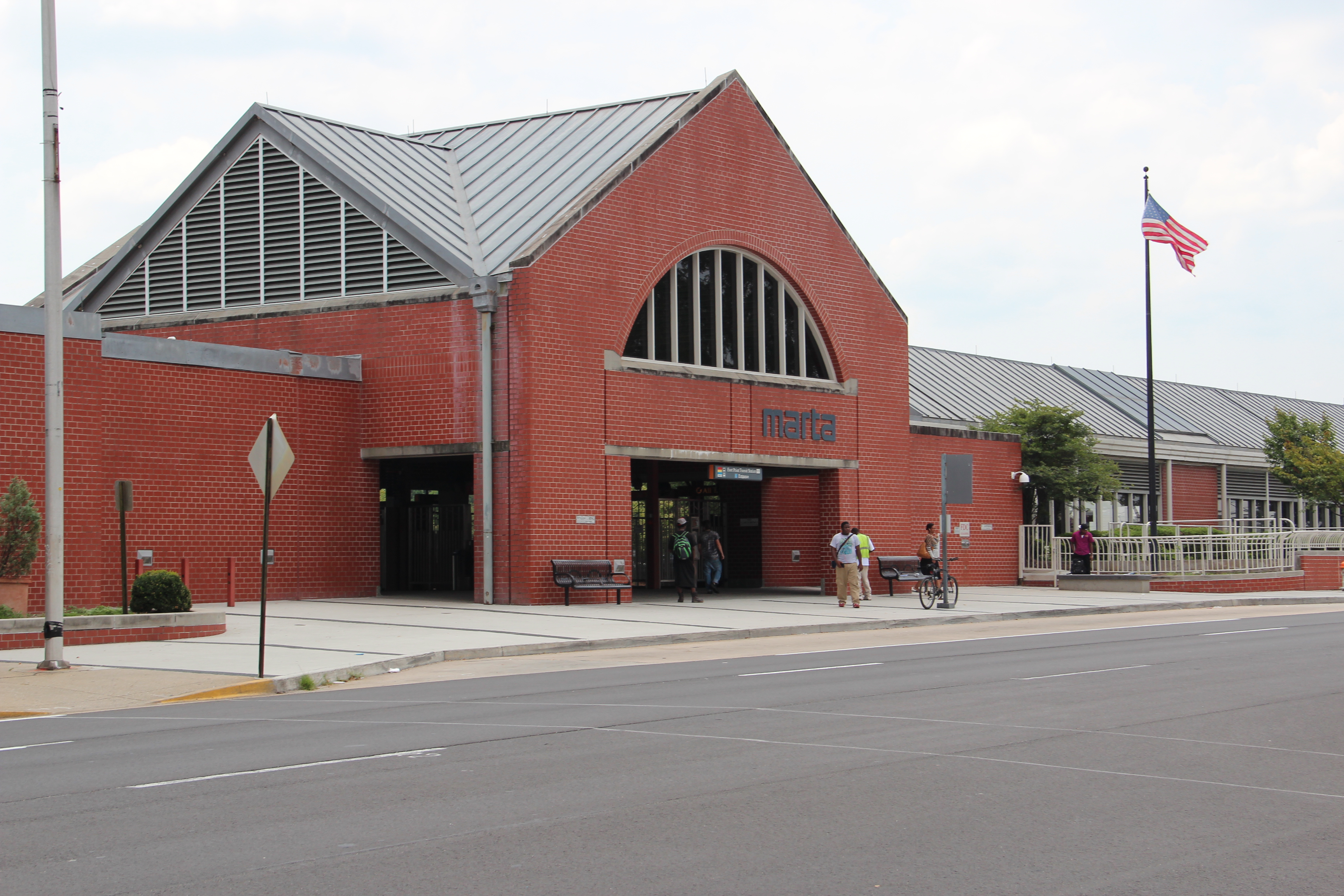
East Point MARTA station

MARTA serves most of the county, and along with Clayton and Dekalb County, Fulton pays a 1% sales tax to fund it. MARTA train service in Fulton is currently limited to the cities of Atlanta, Sandy Springs, East Point, and College Park, as well as the airport. Bus service covers most of the remainder, except the rural areas in the far southwest and Johns Creek. North Fulton residents have been asking for service, to extend the North Line ten miles (16 km) up the Georgia 400 corridor, from Perimeter Center to the fellow edge city of Alpharetta. However, as the only major transit system in the country that its state government will not fund, there is no money to expand the system. Sales taxes now go entirely to operating, maintaining, and refurbishing the system. Xpress GA/ RTA provides commuter bus service from the outer suburbs of Fulton County, the city of Sandy Springs to Midtown and Downtown Atlanta.

=== Recreational trails ===
- Beltline (under construction)
- Big Creek Greenway (under construction)
- PATH400 (under construction)
- Peachtree Creek Greenway (under construction)

=== Airports ===
Hartsfield-Jackson Atlanta International Airport straddles the border with Clayton County to the south and is the busiest airport in the world. The Fulton County Airport, often called Charlie Brown Field after politician Charles M. Brown, is located just west-southwest of Atlanta's city limit. It is run by the county as a municipal or general aviation airport, serving business jets and private aircraft.

== See also ==
- National Register of Historic Places listings in Fulton County, Georgia
- List of counties in Georgia
