= Fulton County Airport (Georgia) =

County Airport in Georgia, United States

Fulton County Airport Charlie Brown Field
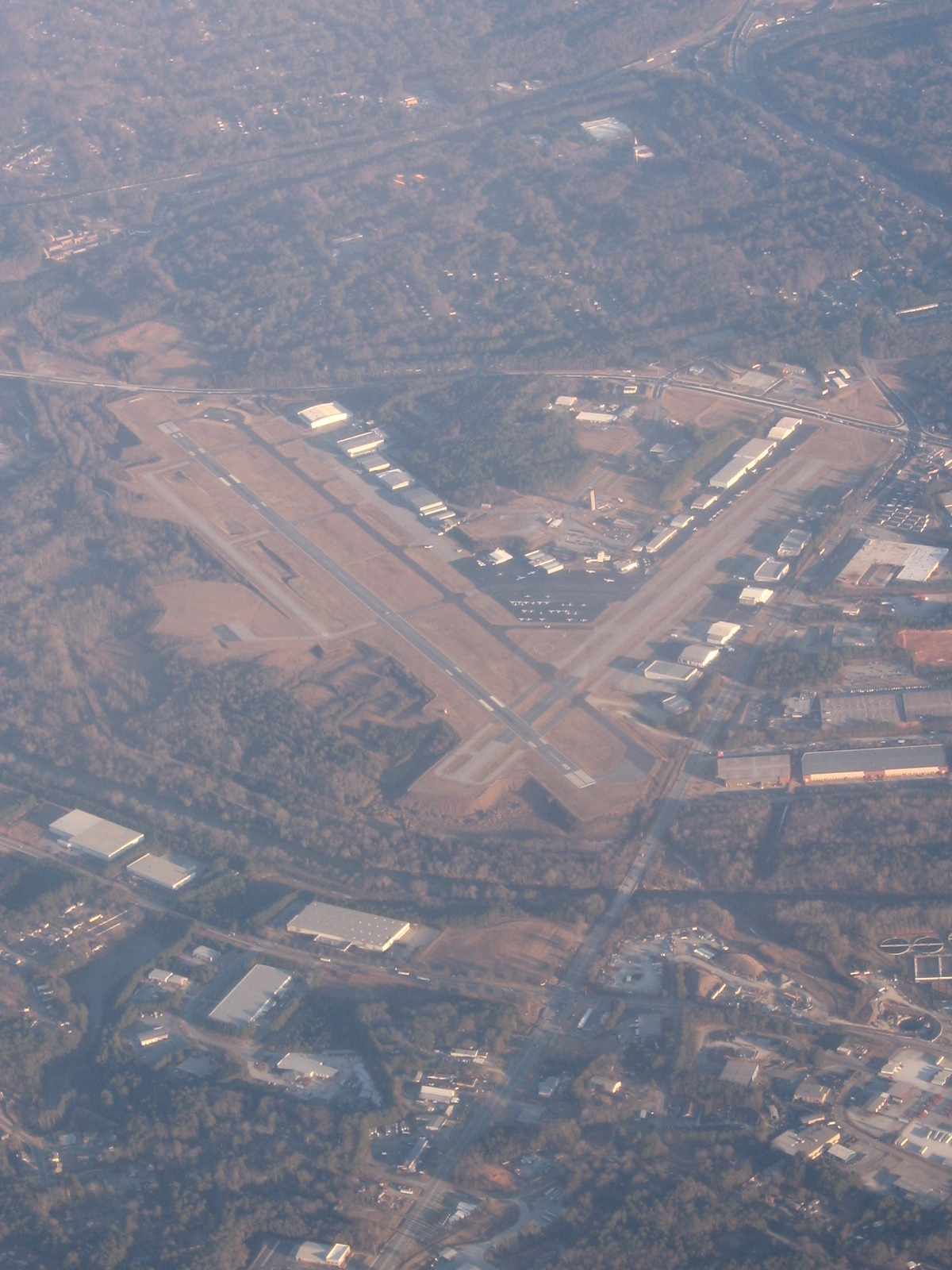
- Aerial view, January 2010
- IATA: FTY; ICAO: KFTY; FAA LID: FTY

Summary
- Airport type: Public
- Owner: Fulton County
- Serves: Atlanta, Georgia
- Elevation AMSL: 841 ft (256 m)
- Coordinates: 33°46′45″N 084°31′17″W
- Website: fultoncountyga.gov/airport

Map
- Location of airport in Georgia FTY (the United States)

Runways
Direction	Length		Surface
Direction	ft	m	Surface
8/26	5,797	1,767	Asphalt
14/32	4,158	1,267	Asphalt

Statistics
- Aircraft operations (2021): 79,449
- Based aircraft: 86
- Source: Federal Aviation Administration

Fulton County Airport (IATA: FTY, ICAO: KFTY, FAA LID: FTY), also known as Charlie Brown Field or Brown’s Field, also the name Fulton County Executive Airport is a county-owned, public-use airport in unincorporated Fulton County, Georgia, United States. It is located 6 nautical miles (6.9 mi; 11 km) west of the central business district of Atlanta. The airport's name comes from the nickname of former Atlanta politician Charles M. Brown, who served on the city council and county commission during the 1960s. It is also called Charlie Brown Airport or Brown Field. On the radio, however, it is referred to as "County Tower" or "County Ground".

As per Federal Aviation Administration records, the airport had 293 passenger boardings (enplanements) in calendar year 2008, 198 enplanements in 2009, and 725 in 2010. It is included in the National Plan of Integrated Airport Systems for 2011–2015, which categorized it as a reliever airport.

It is a local Class D airport located just west of Atlanta and the nearest airport to Hartsfield-Jackson Atlanta International Airport (which is just south of Atlanta), and handles much of the general aviation traffic that would otherwise go there. The airport exists below and in close proximity to ATL's Class B airspace.

It is located very near Interstate 20, Interstate 285, and the Chattahoochee River, just outside the Atlanta city limits. It reports ASOS weather conditions 24 hours per day as West Atlanta. It also acted as the nearest backup weather station when Dobbins Air Reserve Base did not report overnight.

== Facilities and aircraft ==
Fulton County Airport covers an area of 985 acres (399 ha) at an elevation of 841 feet (256 m) above mean sea level. It has two asphalt paved runways: 8/26 is 5,797 by 100 feet; and 14/32 is 4,158 by 100 feet (1,267 x 30 m). It is currently under the management of the Fulton County Public Works Department. David E. Clark is the Fulton County Public Works Director, and Jonathan Gauthier is currently the Airport Manager.

In the year ending December 31, 2021, the airport had 79,449 general aviation aircraft operations, an average of 218 per day. In December 2021, there were 86 aircraft based at this airport: 34 single-engine, 6 multi-engine, 44 jet, and 2 helicopter.

The Airport houses a Georgia Army National Guard armory.

== Accidents at or near FTY ==
- On December 17, 2013, a Beechcraft Premier I operated by Mallen Industries Inc. on approach impacted terrain 6km (3.8 mls) NW of FTY. The pilot was impaired and failed to maintain control during a nighttime approach. Both occupants were killed.
- On December 20, 2018, a Cessna Citation V operated by Chen Aircrafts [sic] LLC crashed shortly after takeoff 2km (1.3 mls) NE of FTY because of loss of control due to spatial disorientation during initial climb in instrument meteorological conditions. All four occupants died.

== See also ==
- List of airports in Georgia (U.S. state)
