= Fulton County Board of Commissioners =

County legislature in Georgia, US

Type
- Type: Board of Commissioners
- Term limits: None

Leadership
- Chair: Robb Pitts (D) since December 20, 2017
- Vice Chair: Khadijah Abdur-Rahman (D) since January 7, 2026

Structure
- Seats: 7
- Political groups: Democratic (4); Republican (2); Vacant (1)
- Length of term: 4 years

Elections
- Voting system: Two-round system
- Last election: November 5, 2024
- Next election: November 3, 2026

Website
- fultoncountyga.gov/commissioners

The Fulton County Board of Commissioners is the seven-member unicameral legislature of Fulton County, Georgia. All members serve staggered four-year terms, with six members being elected from single-member districts while the chairman of the Board of Commissioners is elected at-large for the county-wide position. The vice chairman is elected by peers on a yearly basis.

The board elects the County Manager, who is responsible for day-to-day operation of the county government.

== Commissioners ==
=== Current ===
Board of Commissioners
District	Commissioner	Party
District 7 (at-large)	Robb Pitts (chairman)	Democratic
District 1	Bridget Thorne	Republican
District 2	Bob Ellis	Republican
District 3	Dana Barrett	Democratic
District 4	Vacant	Vacant
District 5	Marvin S. Arrington Jr.	Democratic
District 6	Khadijah Abdur-Rahman	Democratic

=== Past ===
Past members of the commission include Charlie Brown, Charles A. Collier, Karen Handel, Mike Kenn, Martin Luther King III, Michael Lomax, Robert Maddox, Isaac Newton Ragsdale and Henry Lumpkin Wilson.

=== Chairs ===
Name	term start	term end	Ref
Charlie Brown	1945	1947	
Charlie Brown	1976	1978	
Michael Lomax	1981	1993	
Mitch Skandalakis	1993	1998	
Mike Kenn	1998	2007	
John Eaves	2007	2017	
Robb Pitts	2017	present	
