= List of United States political families (K) =

The following is an alphabetical list of political families in the United States whose last name begins with K.

== The Kagens ==
- Marv Kagen, candidate for U.S. Representative from Wisconsin 1966. Father of Steven L. Kagen.
  - Steven L. Kagen (born 1949), U.S. Representative from Wisconsin 2007–11. Son of Marv Kagen.

== The Kaheles ==
- Gil Kahele (1942–2016), Hawaii State Senator 2011–16.
  - Kai Kahele (born 1974), Hawaii State Senator 2016–2021. U.S. Representative (HI-02) 2021–present. Son of Gil Kahele.

== The Kahns ==
- Julius Kahn (1861–1924), U.S. Representative from California 1899–1903, 1905–24.
- Florence Prag Kahn (1866–1948), U.S. Representative from California 1925–37. Wife of Julius Kahn.

== The Katzenbachs ==
- Fran S. Katzenbach (1868–1929), Trenton, New Jersey Alderman; Mayor of Trenton, New Jersey; candidate for Governor of New Jersey 1907; Justice of the New Jersey Supreme Court 1920–29. Brother of Edward L. Katenbach.
- Edward L. Katzenbach (1878–1934), Attorney General of New Jersey. Brother of Frank S. Katzenbach.
- Marie Hilson Katzenbach (1882–1970), delegate to the New Jersey Constitutional Convention 1947. Wife of Edward L. Katzenbach.
  - Frank S. Katzenbach III (1907–1964), delegate to the Democratic National Convention 1940. Son of Frank S. Katzenbach.
  - Nicholas Katzenbach (1922–2012), Attorney General of the United States 1965–66, U.S. Secretary of State 1966–69. Son of Edward L. Katzenbach and Marie Hilson Katzenbach.

NOTE: Marie Hilson Katzenbach was also great-great-granddaughter of Trenton, New Jersey Mayor Moore Furman.

== The Kavanaughs ==
- Brett Kavanaugh (born 1965), White House Staff Secretary 2003–06, Judge of the United States Court of Appeals for the District of Columbia Circuit 2006–18, Associate Justice of the Supreme Court of the United States 2018–present.
- Ashley Estes Kavanaugh (born 1974), Personal Secretary to the President 2001–05, Town Manager of Chevy Chase Section Five, Maryland 2016–present. Wife of Brett Kavanaugh.

== The Kays and Campbells ==
- John Walcott Kay (1890–1927), physician and hospital founder
- Willie Otey Kay (1894–1992), dressmaker. Wife of John Walcott Kay
  - June Kay Campbell (1925–2004), civil rights activist. Daughter of John Walcott and Willie Otey Kay.
  - Ralph Campbell Sr. (1915–1983), President of the NAACP Chapter in Raleigh, North Carolina from 1960 to 1965. President of the Raleigh-Wake Citizens Association from 1970 to 1978 and again from 1982 to 1983. Husband of June Kay Campbell.
    - Ralph Campbell Jr. (1946–2011), Raleigh City Council Member from 1985 to 1991. Mayor Pro Tempore of Raleigh from 1989 to 1991. 15th State Auditor of North Carolina from 1993 to 2005. Son of Ralph Campbell Sr. and June Kay Campbell.
    - William Craig Campbell (born 1953 or 1954), Atlanta City Council Member from 1981 to 1990. 57th Mayor of Atlanta from 2994 to 2002. Son of Ralph Campbell Sr. and June Kay Campbell.

== The Kazens ==
- Abraham Kazen (1919–1987), Texas State Representative 1947, Texas State Senator 1953, U.S. Representative from Texas 1967–85. Uncle of George P. Kazen.
  - George P. Kazen (1940–2021), U.S. District Court Judge in Texas 1979–2009. Nephew of Abraham Kazen.

== The Keans ==
- John Kean (1852–1914), U.S. Representative, NJ 3rd District 1883–85 1887–89, U.S. Senator from New Jersey 1899–1911
- Hamilton Fish Kean (1862–1941), U.S. Senator from New Jersey 1929–35. Brother of John Kean.
  - Robert W. Kean (1893–1980), U.S. Representative, NJ 12th District 1939–59. Son of Hamilton Fish Kean.
    - Thomas H. Kean (born 1935), New Jersey Governor 1982–90. Son of Robert Kean.
      - Thomas H. Kean Jr. (born 1968), U.S. Representative, NJ, 7th District 2022–Present, New Jersey State Senator 2003–2022, Minority Leader 2008–2022, New Jersey State Assemblyman 2001–03. Son of Thomas Kean.

== The Keatings ==
- Kenneth B. Keating (1900–1975), U.S. Representative from New York 1947–59, U.S. Senator from New York 1959–65, delegate to the Republican National Convention 1960 1964, Judge of the New York Court of Appeals 1966–68, U.S. Ambassador to India 1969–72, U.S. Ambassador to Israel 1973–75. Father of Barbara A. Keating.
  - Barbara A. Keating, candidate for U.S. Senate from New York 1974. Daughter of Kenneth B. Keating.

== The Kees ==
- John Kee (1874–1951), West Virginia State Senator 1923–27, U.S. Representative from West Virginia 1933–51. Husband of Elizabeth Kee.
- Elizabeth Kee (1895–1975), U.S. Representative from West Virginia 1951–65. Wife of John Kee.
  - James Kee (1917–1989), U.S. Representative from West Virginia 1965–73. Son of John Kee and Elizabeth Kee.

== The Keims ==
- George May Keim (1805–1861), delegate to the Pennsylvania Constitutional Convention 1837 1838, U.S. Representative from Pennsylvania 1838–43, U.S. Marshal in Pennsylvania, Mayor of Reading, Pennsylvania. Uncle of William High Keim.
  - William High Keim (1813–1862), Mayor of Reading, Pennsylvania; U.S. Representative from Pennsylvania 1858–59, Surveyor General of Pennsylvania 1860–62. Nephew of George May Keim.

== The Kellys and the Townsends ==
- Donald G. Kelly (born 1941), member of the Louisiana State Senate 1976–96, lawyer and horse breeder in Natchitoches, Louisiana, uncle of Taylor Townsend
  - Taylor Townsend (born 1963), member of the Louisiana House of Representatives 2000–08, lawyer in Natchitoches, nephew of Donald G. Kelly

== The Kelseys ==
- William H. Kelsey (1812–1879), Surrogate of Livingston County, New York 1840–44; District Attorney of Livingston County, New York 1850–53; U.S. Representative from New York 1855–71. Brother of Charles S. and Edwin B. Kelsey.
- Charles S. Kelsey, Wisconsin State Senator 1862–64, Wisconsin State Assemblyman 1867 1873 1880. Brother of William H. and Edwin B. Kelsey.
- Edwin B. Kelsey (1826–1861), Wisconsin State Assemblyman 1853, Wisconsin State Senator 1855–56. Brother of William H. and Charles S. Kelsey.
  - Otto Kelsey (1852–1934), New York State Assemblyman 1894–1902, Comptroller of New York 1903–06 1909. Son of Charles S. Kelsey.
  - Julia Kelsey, Postmistress of Montello, Wisconsin. Daughter of Charles S. Kelsey.

== The Kemps ==
- Bolivar E. Kemp (1871–1933), U.S. Representative from Louisiana 1925–33. Father of Bolivar E. Kemp Jr.
  - Bolivar Edwards Kemp Jr. (1904–1965), Attorney General of Louisiana 1948–52. Son of Bolivar E. Kemp.

== The Kenans ==
- James Kenan (1740–1810), North Carolina State Senator
  - Thomas S. Kenan (1771–1843), member of the North Carolina House of Commons and U.S. Congressman from North Carolina. Son of James Kenan.
    - Owen Rand Kenan (1804–1887), member of the North Carolina House of Commons and the 1st Confederate States Congress. Son of Thomas S. Kenan.
      - Thomas Stephen Kenan (1838–1911), Mayor of Wilson, North Carolina, North Carolina Attorney General. Son of Owen Rand Kenan.
      - William Rand Kenan (1845–1903), Collector of the Port of Wilmington
        - William R. Kenan Jr. (1872–1965), chemist, dairy farmer, philanthropist. Son of William Rand Kenan.
        - Sarah Graham Kenan (1876–1968), philanthropist. Daughter of William Rand Kenan.
        - Mary Lily Kenan Flagler Bingham (1867–1917), philanthropist. Daughter of William Rand Kenan.

== The Kendalls of Kentucky ==
- John W. Kendall (1834–1892), Kentucky State Representative 1867–71, Commonwealth Attorney in Kentucky 1872–78, U.S. Representative from Kentucky 1891–92. Father of Joseph M. Kendall.
  - Joseph M. Kendall (1863–1933), U.S. Representative from Kentucky 1892–93 1895–97. Son of John W. Kendall.

== The Kendalls of Massachusetts ==
- Jonas Kendall (1757–1844), Massachusetts State Representative 1800–01 1803–07 1821, Massachusetts State Senator 1808–11, Massachusetts Executive Councilman 1822, U.S. Representative from Massachusetts 1819–21. Father of Joseph G. Kendall.
  - Joseph G. Kendall (1788–1847), Massachusetts State Senator, U.S. Representative from Massachusetts 1829–33, Clerk of Courts of Worcester County, Massachusetts 1833–47. Son of Jonas Kendall.

== The Kennas ==
- John E. Kenna (1848–1893), Prosecuting Attorney of Kanawha County, West Virginia 1872–77; U.S. Representative from West Virginia 1877–83; U.S. Senator from West Virginia 1883–93. Father of Joseph Norris Kenna.
  - Joseph Norris Kenna (1888–1950), West Virginia House Delegate 1931–32, Judge of the West Virginia Court of Appeals 1933–50. Son of John E. Kenna.

== The Kennedys of Maryland ==
- John P. Kennedy (1795–1870), Maryland House Delegate 1821–23, U.S. Representative from Maryland 1838–39 1841–45, U.S. Secretary of the Navy 1852–53. Brother of Anthony Kennedy.
- Anthony Kennedy (1810–1892), Virginia House Delegate 1839–43, candidate for U.S. Representative from Virginia 1844, Maryland House Delegate 1856, U.S. Senator from Maryland 1857–63, delegate to the Maryland Constitutional Convention 1867. Brother of John P. Kennedy.

== The Kennons of Louisiana ==
- Floyd Kennon Sr. (1871–1966), member of the Webster Parish Police Jury, the parish governing body, 1954–56, father of Robert F. Kennon and great-uncle of Edward Kennon
  - Robert F. Kennon (1902–1988), mayor of Minden, Louisiana 1926–28, District attorney of Bossier and Webster parishes 1930–41, Judge of the Second Circuit Court of Appeal in Shreveport, Louisiana 1945–52, Governor of Louisiana 1952–56, son of Floyd Kennon Sr., and uncle of Edward Kennon
    - Edward Kennon (born 1938), member of the Louisiana Public Service Commission 1972–84, nephew of Robert Kennon and great-nephew of Floyd Kennon Sr.

== The Kennons of Ohio ==
- William Kennon Sr. (1793–1881), U.S. Representative from Ohio 1829–33 1835–37, Judge of Court of Common Pleas in Ohio 1840–47, delegate to the Ohio Constitutional Convention 1850, Judge of the Ohio Supreme Court 1854–56. Cousin of William Kennon Jr.
- William Kennon Jr. (1802–1867), Prosecuting Attorney of Belmont County, Ohio 1837–41; U.S. Representative from Ohio 1847–49; Judge of Court of Common Pleas in Ohio 1865–67. Cousin of William Kennon Sr.

== The Kents ==
- Edward Kent (1802–1877), Mayor of Bangor, Maine 1836–37; candidate for Governor Maine 1836; Governor of Maine 1838–39 1841–42; U.S. Consul in Rio de Janeiro, Brazil 1849–53. Father of Edward Kent Jr.
  - Edward Kent Jr. (1862–1916), Chief Justice of the Arizona Territory Supreme Court 1902–12. Son of Edward Kent.

== The Kents and Pratts ==
- Joseph Kent (1779–1837), U.S. Representative from Maryland 1811–15 1819–26, Governor of Maryland 1826–29, U.S. Senator from Maryland 1833–37. Father-in-law of Thomas Pratt.
  - Thomas Pratt (1804–1869), Maryland House Delegate 1832–35, Maryland State Senator 1838–43, Governor of Maryland 1845–48, U.S. Senator from Maryland 1850–57, delegate to the Democratic National Convention 1864, candidate for U.S. Senate from Maryland 1867. Son-in-law of Joseph Kent.

== The Kerns ==
- John W. Kern (1849–1917), Indiana State Representative 1870, Indiana State Senator 1893–97, candidate for Governor of Indiana 1900 1904, candidate for Vice President of the United States 1908, U.S. Senator from Indiana 1911–17, delegate to the Democratic National Convention 1912. Husband of Araminta C. Kern.
- Araminta C. Kern (1866–1951), delegate to the Democratic National Convention 1928. Wife of John W. Kern.
  - John W. Kern Jr. (1900–1971), Judge of the Indiana Superior Court 1931–34, Mayor of Indianapolis, Indiana 1935–37. Son of John W. Kern and Araminta C. Kern.
    - John W. Kern III (1928–2018), Associate Judge of the District of Columbia Court of Appeals 1968–84. Son of John W. Kern Jr.

== The Kerns of Iowa ==
- John Kern (1833–1889), Member of the Iowa Senate (1862–64). Father of Charles B. Kern
  - Charles B. Kern (1867–1942) Member of the Iowa House of Representatives (1917–21) and Iowa Senate (1925–29)

== The Kerns and Myers ==
- John T. Myers (1927-2015), U.S. Representative from Indiana 1967–97. Father-in-law of Brian D. Kerns.
  - Brian D. Kerns (born 1957), U.S. Representative from Indiana 2001–03. Son-in-law of John T. Myers.

== The Kerners and Cermaks ==
- Otto Kerner Sr. (1884–1952), Master in Chancer of the Cook County, Illinois Circuit Court 1915–27; Judge of the Cook County, Illinois Circuit Court 1927–31; Judge of the Illinois Appellate Court 1931–32; Attorney General of Illinois 1932–38; Judge of the U.S. Court of Appeals 1939–52. Father of Otto Kerner Jr.
- Anton J. Cermak (1872–1933), delegate to the Democratic National Convention 1924 1928 1932, candidate for U.S. Senate from Illinois 1928, Mayor of Chicago, Illinois 1931–33. Father-in-law of Otto Kerner Jr.
  - Otto Kerner Jr. (1908–1976), U.S. Attorney in Illinois 1947–54, Judge in Cook County, Illinois 1954–61; Governor of Illinois 1961–68; Judge of U.S. Court of Appeals 1968–74. Son of Otto Kerner Sr.
  - Richey V. Graham (1886–1972), member of the Illinois House of Representatives 1929–31; Illinois State Senate 1931 to 1939. Son-in-law of Anton, J. Cermak; married to Lillian Cermak-daughter of Anton Cermak.

== The Kerrs ==
- John Leeds Kerr (1800–1844), U.S. Representative from Maryland 1825–29 1831–33, U.S. Senator from Maryland 1841–43. Father of John Bozman Kerr.
  - John Bozman Kerr (1809–1878), Maryland House Delegate 1836–38, U.S. Representative from Maryland 1849–51, U.S. Chargé d'Affaires to Nicaragua 1851–53, Solicitor of District of Columbia Court of Claims 1864–68. Son of John Leeds Kerr.

== The Kerrs of North Carolina ==
- John Kerr (1782–1842), U.S. Representative from Virginia 1813–15 1815–17. Cousin of Bartlett Yancey.
- Bartlett Yancey (1785–1828), U.S. Representative from North Carolina 1813–17, North Carolina State Senator 1817–27. Cousin of John Kerr.
- Thomas Settle (1789–1857), member of the North Carolina House of Commons 1816 1826–27, U.S. Representative from North Carolina 1817–21, North Carolina Superior Court Judge. First cousin by marriage of John Kerr and Bartlett Yancey.
  - John Kerr Jr. (1811–1879), candidate for Governor of North Carolina 1852, U.S. Representative from North Carolina 1853–55, North Carolina State Representative 1858 1860, North Carolina Superior Court Judge 1862–63 1874–79. Son of John Kerr.
  - Thomas Settle (1831–1888), member of the North Carolina House of Commons 1854–59, delegate to the North Carolina Constitutional Convention 1865, North Carolina State Senator 1866–68, Justice of the North Carolina Supreme Court 1868–71, U.S. Minister to Peru 1871, candidate for Governor of North Carolina 1876, Judge of U.S. District Court of Florida 1877. Son of Thomas Settle.
  - David S. Reid (1813–1891), North Carolina State Senator 1835–42, U.S. Representative from North Carolina 1843–47, candidate for Governor of North Carolina 1848, Governor of North Carolina 1851–54, U.S. Senator from North Carolina 1854–59. Nephew of Thomas Settle.
    - Thomas Settle III (1865–1919), U.S. Representative from North Carolina 1893–97, candidate for Governor of North Carolina 1912. Son of Thomas Settle.
    - John H. Kerr (1873–1958), U.S. Representative from North Carolina 1923–53, delegate to the Democratic National Convention 1940. Grandnephew of John Kerr.

== The Kerrys and Winthrops ==
- Robert C. Winthrop (1809–1894), Massachusetts State Representative 1835–40, U.S. Representative from Massachusetts 1840–42 1842–50, Speaker of the U.S. House of Representatives 1847–49, U.S. Senator from Massachusetts 1850–51, candidate for Governor of Massachusetts 1851. Great-great-grandfather of John Kerry.
  - John Kerry (born 1943), candidate for U.S. Representative from Massachusetts 1972, Lieutenant Governor of Massachusetts 1983–85, U.S. Senator from Massachusetts 1985–2013, United States Secretary of State 2013–2017, delegate to the Democratic National Convention 2000 2004, candidate for President of the United States 2004. Great-great-grandson of Robert C. Winthrop.

NOTE: John Kerry is also third cousin twice removed of Philippines Governor-General William Cameron Forbes and is distantly related to U.S. President George W. Bush. His wife, Teresa, is also widow of U.S. Senator H. John Heinz III.

== The Kerttulas ==
- Jalmar Martin "Jay" Kerttula (1928-2020), Alaska State Representative 1961–63 1965–73, Alaska State Senator 1973–95. Father of Elizabeth Kerttula
  - Elizabeth J. "Beth" Kerttula (born 1956), Alaska State Representative 1999–2014. Daughter of Jalmar Kerttula

== The Ketchams and Merrills ==
- John Ketcham (1782-1865), Jackson County, Indiana Judge 1816-1817; Member of the Indiana House of Representatives 1825-1827, 1829-1830. Paternal grandfather of William Alexander Ketcham.
- Samuel Merrill (1792-1855), Member of the Indiana House of Representatives 1819-1822, Indiana State Treasurer 1822-1834. Maternal grandfather of William Alexander Ketcham.
  - William A. Ketcham (1846-1921), Indiana Attorney General 1894-1898. Grandson of John Ketcham and Samuel Merrill.

== The Ketchams and Sheltons ==
- Samuel A. Shelton (1858–1948), Clerk of the Webster County, Missouri Circuit Court 1895–99; Postmaster of Marshfield, Missouri 1906–10; Prosecuting Attorney of Webster County, Missouri 1914–16; Chairman of the Webster County, Missouri Republican Committee; U.S. Representative from Missouri 1921–23. Father-in-law of John C. Ketcham.
  - John C. Ketcham (1873–1941), Chairman of the Barry County, Michigan Republican Committee 1902–08; Postmaster of Hastings, Michigan 1907–14; U.S. Representative from Michigan 1931–33. Son-in-law of Samuel A. Shelton.

== The Keys ==
- Philip Key (1750–1820), Maryland House Delegate 1773 1779–90 1795–96, member of the St. Mary's County, Maryland Committee of Correspondence 1774; U.S. Representative from Maryland 1791–93. Cousin of Philip Barton Key.
- Philip Barton Key (1757–1815), Maryland House Delegate 1794–99, U.S. Representative from Maryland 1807–13. Cousin of Philip Key.
  - Francis Scott Key (1779–1843), U.S. Attorney of the District of Columbia 1833–41. Nephew of Philip Barton Key.
  - Roger B. Taney (1777–1864), Maryland House Delegate 1799–1800, Maryland State Senator 1816–21, Attorney General of Maryland 1827–31, Attorney General of the United States 1831–33, U.S. Secretary of the Treasury 1833–34, Chief Justice of the U.S. Supreme Court 1836–64. Nephew by marriage of Philip Barton Key.
    - Philip Barton Key II (1818–1859), U.S. Attorney of the District of Columbia 1853–59. Son of Francis Scott Key.
    - George H. Pendleton (1825–1889), Ohio State Senator 1857–55, U.S. Representative from Pennsylvania 1854–65, delegate to the Democratic National Convention 1864, candidate for Vice President of the United States 1864, candidate for the Democratic nomination for President of the United States 1868, candidate for Governor of Ohio 1869, U.S. Senator from Ohio 1879–85, U.S. Minister to Germany 1885–89. Son-in-law of Francis Scott Key.
      - Barnes Compton (1830–1898), Maryland House Delegate 1860–61, Maryland State Senator 1867–68 1870 1872, Treasurer of Maryland 1874–85, U.S. Representative from Maryland 1885–90 1891–94. Great-grandson of Philip Key.

NOTE: Francis Scott Key was also brother-in-law of U.S. Representative Joseph Hopper Nicholson. George H. Pendleton was also son of U.S. Representative Nathanael Greene Pendleton.

== The Keyes ==
- Henry Keyes (1810–1870), delegate to the Democratic National Convention 1860. Father of Henry W. Keyes.
  - Henry W. Keyes (1863–1938), New Hampshire State Representative 1891–95 1915–17, New Hampshire State Senator 1903–04, Governor of New Hampshire 1917–19, U.S. Senator from New Hampshire 1919–37. Son of Henry Keyes.

== The Keysers ==
- Frank Ray Keyser Sr., (1898–2001), Vermont State Representative 1937–39, Superior Court Judge in Vermont 1956–64, Justice of the Vermont Supreme Court 1964–75. Father of F. Ray Keyser Jr.
  - F. Ray Keyser Jr. (1927-2015), Governor of Vermont 1961–63. Son of Frank Ray Keyser Sr.

== The Kibbeys ==
- Ephraim Kibbey (1754/56-1809), soldier in the Revolutionary War and the Northwest Indian War, frontiersman, member of the 1st Ohio General Assembly 1803. Grandfather of John F. Kibbey.
  - John F. Kibbey (1826-1900), County Judge in Indiana, Indiana Attorney General 1862. Father of Joseph H. Kibbey.
    - Joseph H. Kibbey (1853–1924), Justice of the Arizona Territory Supreme Court 1889, Arizona Territory Councilman 1902, Attorney General of Arizona Territory 1904, delegate to the Republican National Convention 1904, Governor of Arizona Territory 1905–09, candidate for U.S. Senate from Arizona 1916. Son of John F. Kibbey.

NOTE: Joseph H. Kibbey was also son-in-law of Dakota Territory Governor John A. Burbank. John A. Burbank was the brother-in-law of Indiana Governor Oliver P. Morton. John F. Kibbey was a law partner of Morton's in Richmond, Indiana and also served in Morton's administration as Attorney General.

== The Kidders ==
See Kidder Family.

== The Kilbournes ==
- James Kilbourne (1770–1850), U.S. Representative from Ohio 1813–17, Ohio State Representative 1823–24 1838–39. Father of Byron Kilbourn.
  - Byron Kilbourn (1801–1870), Surveyor of Ohio, Milwaukee, Wisconsin Alderman; Mayor of Milwaukee, Wisconsin 1848 1854, candidate for U.S. Senate from Wisconsin 1855. Son of James Kilbourne.

== The Kilburns ==
- Frederick D. Kilburn, New York State Senator 1894–95. Father of Clarence E. Kilburn.
  - Clarence E. Kilburn (1893–1975), U.S. Representative from New York 1940–65. Son of Frederick D. Kilburn.

== The Kilpatricks ==
- Carolyn Cheeks Kilpatrick (born 1945), Michigan State Representative 1979–96, U.S. Representative from Michigan 1997–2011. Mother of Kwame Kilpatrick.
  - Kwame Kilpatrick (born 1970), Michigan State Representative 1997–2001, delegate to the Democratic National Convention 2000 2004 Mayor of Detroit, Michigan 2002–08. Son of Carolyn Cheeks Kilpatrick.

== The Kimballs ==
- Dan Kimball (died 1982), judge of the Louisiana 18th Judicial District Court for Iberville, Pointe Coupee, and West Baton Rouge parishes, uncle of Clyde Kimball, uncle by marriage of Catherine D. Kimball
- Catherine D. Kimball (born 1945), Louisiana 18th Judicial District Court judge, 1983–91; justice of the Louisiana Supreme Court, 1993–2013; chief justice, 2009–13, wife of Clyde Kimball
- Clyde Kimball (born 1942), member of the Louisiana House of Representatives, 1976–92, for Pointe Coupee and West Baton Rouge parishes, nephew of Dan Kimball and husband of Catherine D. Kimball; the couple resides in Ventress, Louisiana

== The Kings ==
- Henry King (1790–1861), Pennsylvania State Senator 1826–28 1830–32, U.S. Representative from Pennsylvania 1831–35. Brother of Thomas Butler King.
- Thomas Butler King (1800–1864), Georgia State Senator 1833–35 1837 1859, U.S. Representative from Georgia 1839–43 1845–50, Collector of the Port of San Francisco 1850–52, candidate for U.S. Senate from California, delegate to the Democratic National Convention 1860. Brother of Henry King.
  - John Floyd King (1842–1915), U.S. Representative from Louisiana 1879–87. Son of Thomas Butler King.

== The Kings and Reavleys ==
- Thomas Morrow Reavley (born 1921), Secretary of State of Texas 1955–57, Judge of the United States Court of Appeals for the Fifth Circuit 1979–90.
- Carolyn Dineen King (born 1938), Judge of the United States Court of Appeals for the Fifth Circuit 1979–2013. Wife of Thomas Morrow Reavley.

== The Kings of Hawaii ==
- Samuel Wilder King (1886–1959), Delegate to the U.S. House of Representatives from Hawaii 1935–43, Territorial Governor of Hawaii 1953–57.
  - Samuel Pailthorpe King (1916–2010), Judge of the United States District Court for the District of Hawaii 1972–84. Son of Samuel Wilder King.

== The Kings of Massachusetts ==
- Edward J. King (1925–2006), Governor of Massachusetts 1979–83. Brother of Paul King.
- Paul King, Massachusetts State Court Judge. Brother of Edward J. King.

== The Kings of Massachusetts and New York ==
See King political family.

== The Kings of New Mexico ==
- Bruce King (1924–2009), New Mexico State Representative 1959, delegate to the New Mexico Constitutional Convention 1969, Governor of New Mexico 1971–75 1979–83 1991–95, delegate to the Democratic National Convention 1980. Father of Gary King.
  - Gary King (born 1954), member of the New Mexico Legislature, candidate for U.S. Representative from New Mexico 2004, Attorney General of New Mexico 2007–2015. Son of Bruce King.

== The Kings of Utah ==
- William H. King (1863–1949), member of the Utah Territory Legislature, Utah Territory Councilman 1891, Justice of the Utah Supreme Court 1894–96, U.S. Representative from Utah 1897–99 1900–01, candidate for U.S. Representative from Utah 1902, U.S. Senator from Utah 1917–41. Father of David S. King.
  - David S. King (1917-2009), U.S. Representative from Utah 1959–63 1965–67, candidate for U.S. Senate from Utah 1962, U.S. Ambassador to Malagasy Republic 1967–69, U.S. Ambassador to Mauritius 1968–69. Son of William H. King.

== The Kirks ==
- Paul Grattan Kirk Sr. (1904–1982), Judge of the Massachusetts Superior Court 1937–60, Justice of the Massachusetts Supreme Judicial Court 1960–70. Father of Paul G. Kirk.
  - Paul G. Kirk (born 1938), Chairman of the Democratic National Committee 1985–89, superdelegate to the Democratic National Convention 2008, U.S. Senator from Massachusetts 2009–10. Son of Paul Grattan Kirk Sr.

== The Kirks and Crenshaws ==
- Claude R. Kirk Jr. (1926–2011), Governor of Florida 1967–71
  - Ander Crenshaw (born 1944), Florida State Representative 1972–78, Florida State Senator 1986–94, U.S. Representative from Florida 2001-17. Son-in-law of Claude R. Kirk Jr.

== The Kirkpatricks ==
- William Sebring Kirkpatrick (1844–1932), Solicitor of Easton, Pennsylvania 1866–74; Judge in Pennsylvania; delegate to the Pennsylvania Republican Convention 1882; delegate to the Republican National Convention 1884; Attorney General of Pennsylvania 1887–91; candidate for U.S. Representative from Pennsylvania 1894; U.S. Representative from Pennsylvania 1897–99. Father of William Huntington Kirkpatrick.
  - William Huntington Kirkpatrick (1885–1970), U.S. Representative from Pennsylvania 1921–23, U.S. District Court Judge in Pennsylvania 1927–58. Son of William Sebring Kirkpatrick.

== The Kirkpatricks and the Futrells of Louisiana ==
- Claude Kirkpatrick (1917–1997), member of the Louisiana House of Representatives for Jefferson Davis Parish, 1952–60; unsuccessful candidate for governor of Louisiana in 1963, husband of Edith Kirkpatrick and in-law of P. Elmo Futrell Jr.
- Edith Killgore Kirkpatrick, member of the Louisiana Board of Regents for Higher Education, 1977 to 1989, husband of Claude Kirkpatrick and in-law of P. Elmo Futrell Jr.

== The Kitchins ==
- William Hodges Kitchin (1837–1901), U.S. Representative from North Carolina.
  - William Walton Kitchin (1866–1924), U.S. Representative and Governor of North Carolina, son of William H. Kitchin.
  - Sue Musette Satterfield Kitchin (1874–1956), First Lady of North Carolina, wife of William Walton Kitchin.
    - Musette Satterfield Kitchin (1906–1996), member of the Halifax County School Board, daughter of William Walton Kitchin and Sue Musette Satterfield Kitchin.
      - Musette Kitchin Dunn Steck, Town Councillor of St. James, North Carolina, daughter of Musette Satterfield Kitchin.
  - Claude Kitchin (1869–1923), U.S. Representative from North Carolina, son of William H. Kitchin.
  - Alvin Paul Kitchin Sr. (1873–1923), Member of the North Carolina House of Representatives 1906–1910, Member of the North Carolina Senate from the 4th district 1910–1912, son of William Hodges Kitchin.
    - Alvin Paul Kitchin Jr. (1908–1983), U.S. Representative from North Carolina, son of Alvin Paul Kitchin Sr.
  - Thurman Delna Kitchin (1885–1955), 9th President of Wake Forest University 1930–1950, son of William Hodges Kitchin.

== The Kitteras and Conrads ==
- John W. Kittera (1752–1801), U.S. Representative from Pennsylvania 1791–1801, U.S. District Attorney in Pennsylvania 1801. Father of Thomas Kittera.
  - Thomas Kittera (1789–1839), U.S. Representative from Pennsylvania 1826–27. Son of John W. Kittera.
    - Robert Thomas Conrad, Mayor of Philadelphia, Pennsylvania 1854–56. Son-in-law of Thomas Kittera.

== The Kloebs and Le Blonds ==
- Francis Celeste Le Blond (1821–1902), Ohio State Representative 1851–55 U.S. Representative from Ohio 1863–67. Grandfather of Frank Le Blond Kloeb.
  - Frank Le Blond Kloeb (1890–1976), U.S. Representative from Ohio 1933–37. Grandson of Francis Celeste Le Blond.

== The Klutznicks and Saltzmans ==
- Philip M. Klutznick (1907–1999), U.S. Secretary of Commerce 1980–81. Father of Bettylu Saltzman.
  - Bettylu Saltzman, delegate to the Democratic National Convention 1980. Daughter of Philip M. Klutznick.

== The Knapps ==
- Anthony L. Knapp (1828–1881), Illinois State Senator 1859–61, U.S. Representative from Illinois 1861–65. Brother of Robert M. Knapp.
- Robert M. Knapp (1831–1889), Illinois State Representative 1867, Mayor of Jerseyville, Illinois 1871–76; U.S. Representative from Illinois 1873–75 1877–79. Brother of Anthony L. Knapp.

== The Knights ==
- Nehemiah Knight (1746–1808), Rhode Island Assemblyman 1783 1787, Sheriff of Providence County, Rhode Island 1787; U.S. Representative from Rhode Island 1803–08. Father of Nehemiah R. Knight.
  - Nehemiah R. Knight (1780–1854), Clerk of Rhode Island Court of Common Pleas 1805–11, Clerk of Rhode Island Circuit Court 1812–17, Collector of Customs of Rhode Island 1812–17, Governor of Rhode Island 1817–21, U.S. Senator from Rhode Island 1821–41. Son of Nehemiah Knight.

== The Knights and Milners ==
- John B. Milner, Judge in Provo, Utah. Grandfather of Goodwin Knight.
  - Goodwin Knight (1896–1970), Superior Court Judge in California 1935–46, Lieutenant Governor of California 1947–53, Governor of California 1953–59, delegate to the Republican National Convention 1956 1960, candidate for U.S. Senate from California 1958. Grandson of John B. Milner.

== The Knollenbergs ==
- Joseph Knollenberg (1933–2018), U.S. Representative from Michigan 1993–2009. Father of Martin Knollenberg.
  - Martin Knollenberg (born 1963), Commissioner of Oakland County, Michigan 2002–04; Michigan State Representative 2005–present. Son of Joseph Knollenberg.

== The Knotts ==
- Joseph Thomas Knott Sr. (1889–1952), member of the Wakelon School Board
  - Joseph Thomas Knott Jr. (born 1926), member of the Wake County Board of Commissioners 1970–1982, son of Joseph Thomas Knott Sr.
    - Joseph Thomas Knott III (born 1951), Assistant United States Attorney and member of the University of North Carolina Board of Governors, son of Joseph Thomas Knott Jr.
      - John Bradford Knott (born 1986), member of the United States House of Representatives for North Carolina's 13th congressional district, son of Joseph Thomas Knott III
      - Joanna Saleeby Knott, businesswoman, wife of John Bradford Knott.

== The Knous ==
- William Lee Knous (1889–1959), Colorado State Senator 1930–37, Justice of the Colorado Supreme Court 1937–46, Chief Justice of the Colorado Supreme Court 1946–47, Governor of Colorado 1947–50, Judge of U.S. District Court of Colorado 1950–59. Father of Robert Lee Knous.
  - Robert Lee Knous (1917–2000), Colorado State Senator 1953–57, Lieutenant Governor of Colorado 1959–67, candidate for Governor of Colorado 1966. Son of William Lee Knous.

== The Knowlands ==
- Joseph R. Knowland (1873–1966), California Assemblyman 1899–1903, California State Senator 1903–04, U.S. Representative from California 1904–15, candidate for U.S. Senate from California 1914. Father of William F. Knowland.
  - William F. Knowland (1908–1974), California Assemblyman 1933–35, California State Senator 1935–39, Chairman of the Republican National Committee 1940–42, U.S. Senator from California 1945–59. Son of Joseph R. Knowland.

== The Knowles ==
- Warren P. Knowles (1908–1993), Wisconsin State Senator 1941–55, delegate to the Republican National Convention 1948 1956 1960 1964 1972, Lieutenant Governor of Wisconsin 1955–59 1961–63, candidate for the Republican nomination for U.S. Senate from Wisconsin 1957, Governor of Wisconsin 1965–71. Brother of Robert P. Knowles.
- Robert P. Knowles (1916–1985), Wisconsin State Senator 1955–75, delegate to the Republican National Convention 1972. Brother of Warren P. Knowles.

== The Kohlers ==
- John Michael Kohler (1844–1900), Mayor of Sheboygan, Wisconsin. Father of Walter J. Kohler Sr.
  - Walter J. Kohler Sr. (1875–1940), Governor of Wisconsin 1929–31. Father of Walter J. Kohler Jr.
    - Walter J. Kohler Jr. (1904–1976), Governor of Wisconsin 1951–57, candidate for U.S. Senate from Wisconsin 1957. Son of Walter J. Kohler Sr.
      - Terry Jodok Kohler (1934-2016), candidate for the Republican nomination for U.S. Senate from Wisconsin 1980, candidate for Governor of Wisconsin 1982, Republican National Committeeman 2002–2007, delegate to the Republican National Convention 2004. Son of Walter J. Kohler Jr.

== The Kooikers ==
- John Kooiker (born 1946), Member of the Iowa House of Representatives (2015–2017). Father of Sam Kooiker.
  - Sam Kooiker (born 1974), Mayor of Rapid City, South Dakota (2011–2015) City manager of Cherokee (2015–2018), and Sheldon, Iowa (2018–). Son of John Kooiker.

== The Koppelmans ==
- Kim Koppelman (born 1956), Member of the North Dakota House of Representatives (1994-2022), Speaker of the North Dakota House (2020-2022), candidate for Congress in 2012. Father of Ben Koppelman.
  - Ben Koppelman (born 1980), Member of the North Dakota House of Representatives (2012–present). Son of Kim Koppelman.

== The Krupanskys ==
- Robert B. Krupansky (1921-2004), Judge of the United States District Court for the Northern District of Ohio 1970–82, Judge of the United States Court of Appeals for the Sixth Circuit 1982–91.
- Blanche Krupansky (1925-2008), Ohio Supreme Court Associate Justice 1981–83. Sister of Robert B. Krupansky.

== The Kuciniches ==
- Dennis Kucinich (born 1946), candidate for Cleveland, Ohio Councilman 1967; Cleveland, Ohio Councilman 1969–73 1983; Cleveland, Ohio Clerk of Courts 1975; Mayor of Cleveland, Ohio 1977–79; Ohio State Senator 1995–96; U.S. Representative from Ohio 1997–2013; delegate to the Democratic National Convention 2000 2004 2008; candidate for the Democratic nomination for President of the United States 2004 2008. Brother of Gary Kucinich.
- Gary Kucinich, Cleveland, Ohio Councilman; candidate for Mayor of Cleveland, Ohio 1985. Brother of Dennis Kucinich.

== The Kuglers ==
- George F. Kugler Jr. (1925–2004), Attorney General of New Jersey 1970–74.
  - Robert B. Kugler (born 1950), Judge of the United States District Court for the District of New Jersey 2002–18. Son of George F. Kugler Jr.

== The Kvales ==
- Ole J. Kvale (1869–1929), candidate for U.S. Representative from Minnesota 1920, U.S. Representative from Minnesota 1923–29. Father of Paul J. Kvale.
  - Paul John Kvale (1896–1960), U.S. Representative from Minnesota 1929–39. Son of Ole J. Kvale.

== The Kyls ==
- John Henry Kyl (1919–2002), U.S. Representative from Iowa 1959–65 1967–73. Father of Jon Kyl.
  - Jon Kyl (1942–2026), U.S. Representative from Arizona 1987–95, U.S. Senator from Arizona 1995–2013 2018. Son of John Henry Kyl.
