= Ralph Campbell =

Ralph Campbell may refer to:

- Ralph Campbell Sr. (1915–1983), American postal worker and civil rights activist
- Ralph Campbell Jr. (1946–2011), his son, state auditor of North Carolina
- Ralph E. Campbell (1867–1921), United States federal judge
- Woody Campbell (basketball) (1925–2004), Canadian basketball player
- Ralph Abercromby Campbell, Chief Justice of the Bahamas, 1960–1970
