= Raleigh National Cemetery =

Historic veterans cemetery in Raleigh, North Carolina

- U.S. National Register of Historic Places
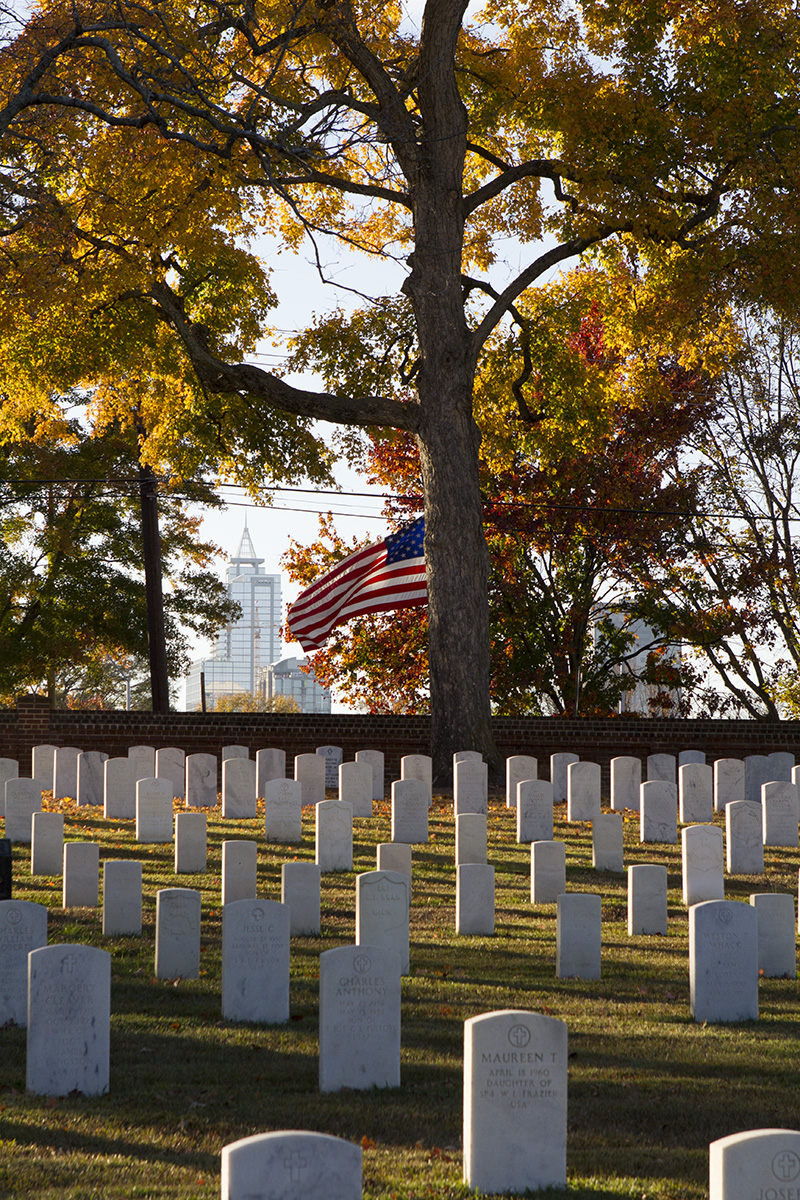

- Location within North Carolina Location within the United States
- Location: 501 Rock Quarry Rd., Raleigh, North Carolina
- Coordinates: 35°46′27″N 78°37′14″W
- Built: 1865
- Architectural style: Colonial Revival
- MPS: Civil War Era National Cemeteries MPS
- NRHP reference No.: 97000022
- Added to NRHP: January 31, 1997

Raleigh National Cemetery is a United States National Cemetery located in the city of Raleigh in Wake County, North Carolina. Administered by the United States Department of Veterans Affairs, it encompasses 7 acres (2.8 ha), and as of the end of 2005, had 6,000 interments. It is currently closed to new interments and is maintained by New Bern National Cemetery.

== History ==
The cemetery was established in 1865. The cemetery lodge formerly housed the cemetery superintendents / directors. It was built in 1938, and is a two-story, six-room Colonial Revival frame building with a brick veneer and slate roof. Other contributing resources are the entrance gate, perimeter wall, rostrum, flagpole, and artillery monument. Raleigh National Cemetery was listed on the National Register of Historic Places in 1997.

== Notable monuments ==
- The Artillery Monument, a black iron wrought cannon mounted on a cement pedestal, erected circa 1890.

== Notable interments ==
- Sergeant First Class William Maud Bryant (1933–1969 †), US Army Special Forces – Medal of Honor recipient for action in the Vietnam War
- June Kay Campbell (1925–2004), Civil rights activist
- Ralph Campbell Sr. (1915–1983), president of the Raleigh Chapter of the NAACP
- Arthur Elliot Crump (1901–1976), baseball player
- Major General John H. Manning (1889–1963), Adjutant General of North Carolina
- Staff Sergeant Millie Dunn Veasey (1918–2018), member of the Women's Army Corps during World War II, president of the Raleigh Chapter of the NAACP
