= Henry L. Bridges =

American lawyer and politician

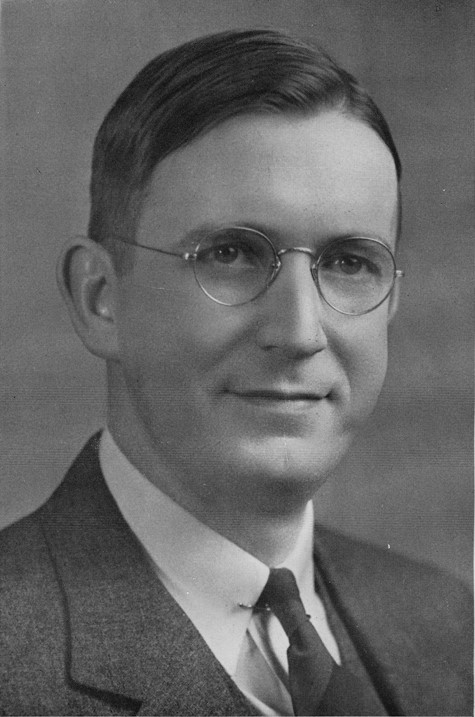

Auditor of North Carolina
- In office February 15, 1947 – 1981
- Governor: R. Gregg Cherry; W. Kerr Scott; William B. Umstead; Luther H. Hodges; Terry Sanford; Dan K. Moore; Robert W. Scott; James Holshouser; Jim Hunt
- Preceded by: George Ross Pou
- Succeeded by: Edward Renfrow

Personal details
- Born: June 10, 1907; Franklin County, North Carolina, United States
- Died: April 6, 2002 (aged 94); Raleigh, North Carolina
- Political party: Democratic
- Spouse: Clarice Ramsey Hines (m. 1936)
- Children: 2
- Education: Mars Hill College; Wake Forest College; Wake Forest Law School

Henry Lee Bridges (June 10, 1907 – April 6, 2002) was an American lawyer and politician. A Democrat, he served as the Auditor of North Carolina from 1947 to 1981.

== Early life ==
Henry Bridges was born on June 10, 1907, to John Joseph Bridges and Ida Carroll in Franklin County, North Carolina, United States. He was the youngest of 12 children. After his parents died, Bridges worked on a cousin's farm in Wake County. He attended Wakelon School from 1914 to 1920, Wiley School in 1921, Wakelon School in 1922, and then Millbrook High School from 1923 to 1925. He then went to Mars Hill College and Wake Forest College, graduating in 1931 with a Bachelor of Arts. He worked as a teacher in Germanton for a year before enrolling in Wake Forest Law School, graduating in 1933. He was admitted to the North Carolina State Bar and opened a law practice in Greensboro. He became a member of the Greensboro Bar Association.

Bridges enlisted in the North Carolina National Guard in May 1934 as a private. He was promoted to the rank of sergeant in February 1935 before being commissioned a second lieutenant on June 18. He was promoted to first lieutenant on November 18, 1939. He was federalized on September 16, 1940, and released from federal duty on November 2, 1941. Bridges was recalled to federal duty on October 7, 1942, and promoted to the rank of captain on January 28, 1943. During World War II he was stationed with coastal artillery units on Trinidad and at Dutch Harbor in the Aleutian Islands. He was released again from duty on December 14, 1945, and was made a major on January 17, 1947. Following his discharge he returned to legal work in Greensboro.

On December 12, 1936, Bridges married Clarice Ramsey Hines. They had two children. He took up amateur filmmaking as a hobby in 1938.

== Political career ==
Bridges was a member of the Democratic Party. From 1933 to 1940 he served as a secretary and treasurer of the Guilford County Democratic Executive Committee. He worked as a deputy clerk at the Superior Court of Guilford County at various times from August 1935 until June 1, 1946, with his active duty military service occurring in the intervening periods. He resigned on June 1, 1946, to engage in private law practice.

On February 15, 1947, Governor R. Gregg Cherry appointed Bridges Auditor of North Carolina to replace George Ross Pou, who had died while in office. In 1948 he won election to a full four-year term at the post, and was ultimately reelected seven more times. While in office he had all government departments adopt a uniform accounting system. His insistence on a coherent system of record-keeping led to conflict between him and the State Highway Commission in the early 1970s. In 1974 the North Carolina General Assembly, at his request, authorized the creation of an operational audit program. Bridges decided not to run for reelection in 1980 and left office the following year.

== Later life ==
Bridges' wife died in 1999. He died on April 6, 2002, at his home in Raleigh.

== Works cited ==
- North Carolina Manual. Raleigh: North Carolina Secretary of State. 1959. OCLC 244106583.

Party political offices
Preceded by George Ross Pou	Democratic nominee for North Carolina State Auditor; 1948, 1952, 1956, 1960, 1964, 1968, 1972, 1976	Succeeded by Ed Renfrow
