= 1981 Atlanta City Council election =

- October 6, 1981; October 27, 1981 (runoff)

The 1981 Atlanta City Council took place on October 6, 1981, to elect the Atlanta City Council, with a runoff held on October 27, 1981. The election took place concurrently with the 1981 Atlanta mayoral election.

== Council President ==
=== Declared candidates ===
- Marvin S. Arrington Sr. (won)
- Arthur Langford Jr.
- Harold Williams

== District 1 ==
- Wilma Denise Jackson
- Debby McCarty

== District 2 ==
- Charles Allen
- Bill Campbell (won)
- Carrie Copeland
- Grace Davis
- Mercedes King

== District 3 ==
=== Declared candidates ===
- Charles Bennett
- James Howard
- David Reeves

=== Withdrawn candidates ===
- M. G. Amos

== District 4 ==
- James Bond
- Thomas Cuffie
- Robert "Tree" Reese
- Hildred Shumake Jr

== District 5 ==
- Jerome Carithers
- Morris Finley
- Amos Moore
- Johnny Williams

=== Disqualified candidates ===
- J. Jackson

== District 6 ==
- Mary Davis
- Louis Foster

== District 7 ==
- Buddy Fowlkes

== District 8 ==
- Richard Guthman Jr

== District 9 ==
- Larkin Bell
- Archie Byron (won)
- Fredrick Gilbert
- Robert "Bob" Lane
- Verdree Lockhart
- Benny T. Smith
- Ernest Lee Wheeler

== District 10 ==
- Ira Jackson
- Larry E. Moss

== District 11 ==
- Jim Maddox
- Jacob C. Maxey
- Sylvester Stinson
- Vangie Watkins

== District 12 ==
- Dozier Smith
- Fred Steeple

== At-Large Post 13 ==
- Marion L. Green
- Sidney Hunter
- Robb Pitts (won)
- John Sweet

== At-Large Post 14 ==
- Carolyn Long Banks (won)
- Ben Perry

== At-Large Post 15 ==
- Sherman Barge
- Elaine Wiggins Lester

== At-Large Post 16 ==
- Barbara Miller Asher

== At-Large Post 17 ==
- Myrtle R. Davis (won)
- John H. Lewis Sr.
- Q. V. Williamson (incumbent)

== At-Large Post 18 ==
- Jack Summers
- John Lewis
