= Atlanta Empowerment Zone =

$250 million federal program

The Atlanta Empowerment Zone was established in November 1994 as a 10-year, $250 million federal program to revitalize Atlanta's 34 poorest neighborhoods. Scathing reports from both the U.S. Department of Housing and Urban Development and the Georgia Department of Community Affairs revealed corruption, waste, bureaucratic incompetence, and interference by mayor Bill Campbell. The Zone "imploded" in 2001 and was succeeded by ACoRA (Atlanta Coordinating Responsible Authority).
