= Ed Renfrow =

American politician and pastor

Edward Renfrow (born September 17, 1940) is an American politician and pastor. He formerly served as Auditor of North Carolina, state legislator, and controller in North Carolina. A Democrat, he served as state auditor from 1981 until 1993. In 2006, he became a pastor in a Baptist church.

== Early life ==
Edward Renfrow was born on September 17, 1940, in Johnston County, North Carolina. He graduated from Clayton High School in 1958.

Party political offices
Preceded by Henry L. Bridges	Democratic nominee for North Carolina State Auditor; 1980, 1984, 1988	Succeeded by Ralph Campbell Jr.
