= Millie Dunn Veasey =

American military personnel (1918–2018)

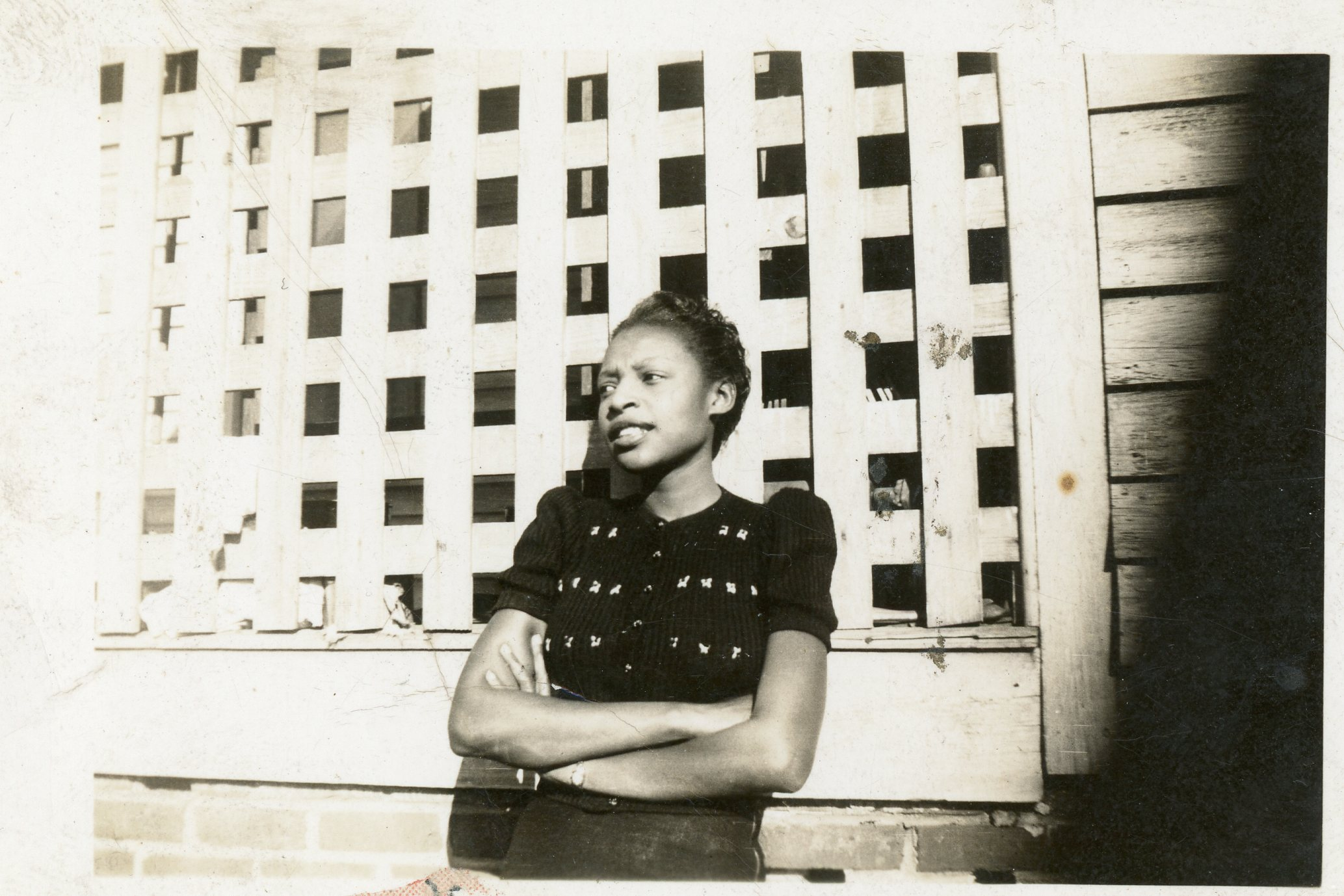

Personal details
- Born: January 31, 1918 Raleigh, North Carolina, U.S.
- Died: March 9, 2018 (aged 100) Raleigh, North Carolina, U.S.
- Resting place: Raleigh National Cemetery
- Spouse: Warren L. Veasey
- Education: St. Augustine's College (BA); North Carolina Central University (MA)
- Occupation: Activist, soldier, schoolteacher

Military service
- Allegiance: United States
- Branch/service: United States Army; Women's Army Corps
- Years of service: 1942–1945
- Rank: Staff sergeant
- Unit: 6888th Central Postal Directory Battalion
- Battles/wars: World War II; *European Theatre

Millie Dunn Veasey (January 31, 1918 – March 9, 2018) was an American veteran, who served from 1942 to 1945 in the Women’s Army Corps (WAC) and the Women's Auxiliary Army Corps (WAAC).

After returning home from World War II, she worked as executive secretary at St. Augustine’s University under two college presidents, Dr. James Boyer and Dr. Prezell Robinson. She was active in the civil rights movement with the Raleigh-Wake Chapter of the National Association for the Advancement of Colored People (NAACP), where she became president in 1965.

== Early life ==
Veasey was born in Raleigh, North Carolina, just nine blocks away from the North Carolina State Capitol building as one of six children in the family. She was named for her grandmother, Millie Gunter Henry, who inspired her by continually seeking to serve others, through work at Raleigh's First Baptist Church on Wilmington Street, where Veasey attended.

Veasey attended Washington High School in Raleigh, North Carolina. After graduating from Washington, Veasey worked with the Wake County extension agent before joining the United States Army.

== Education ==
In 1953, Veasey graduated from St. Augustine’s College in Raleigh, North Carolina, with a Bachelor of Arts degree in business education and a minor in English. She attended college on the G.I. Bill, and while enrolled, she worked as the executive secretary to the President, James Boyer.

A few years later, she attended North Carolina Central University and earned a Master of Arts degree in business administration as well as an education counseling minor.

== Career ==
Veasey enlisted in the army with the “six-triple-eight” battalion, the 6888th Central Postal Directory Battalion in December 1942.

This unit was the only all-female and all-black battalion to serve during World War II overseas. She began her examinations in Fort Bragg, North Carolina, the following month. In April 1943, Veasey was shipped to Fort Des Moines, Iowa for basic military training. She completed her basic training in Denver, Colorado, and was stationed as a clerk for the cooks and bakers school in Fort Clark, Texas, until the spring of 1944. She then headed to Camp Maxey, Texas, and worked in the hospital with secretarial duties.

She completed overseas training in Georgia before heading to the European Theatre in early February 1945, arriving in Glasgow, on the Queen Elizabeth. She was in Birmingham, England, for four months before transferring to Rouen, France, as a supply clerk until she was discharged. In 1945, she left the WAC as a staff sergeant.

For four years, she taught business education at Thomas Hunter High School in Mathews, Virginia, as well as eighth grade English. She then returned to Raleigh and worked for St. Augustine's before eventually retiring as director of career planning and placement/cooperative education in 1986.

== Personal life and death ==
Veasey was married in 1949 to Warren L. Veasey, who died in 1961, and had two stepchildren, Juanita and Warren Jr. She died on March 9, 2018, in Raleigh at age 100. She was buried at Raleigh National Cemetery.

== Legacy ==
Veasey served as a prominent figure in the civil rights movement. A local leader in the NAACP, she became the first female president of the Wake County chapter.

In her role as president, Veasey worked with other NAACP leaders on a local and national scale. She interacted with key figures such as Thurgood Marshall, and once sat next to Dr. Martin Luther King Jr. during the 1963 March on Washington. In addition to the NAACP, she was also involved in the National Federation of Democratic Women and the American Legion.

After her retirement from St. Augustine's College in 1986, Veasey continued to stay involved in her community for several years. She taught as a Sunday school teacher at her church and regularly assisted neighbors with tax forms. She was a member of local organizations in Raleigh, North Carolina and regularly volunteered with American Legion Post 157. Veasey was also a member of the Zeta Phi Beta sorority and held both national and regional leadership positions.

Her Army uniforms, which were donated to the North Carolina Museum of History in Raleigh, North Carolina, are the only known examples of uniforms from the 6888th Battalion.

On February 13, 2018, the Congressional Black Caucus Foundation honored Veasey, in absentia, with the "Distinguished Veteran Living Legend Award." Veasey was posthumously inducted into the Raleigh Hall of Fame on November 4, 2018.

On January 7, 2025 a post office in Raleigh, North Carolina located off of Brentwood Road was renamed in Veasey’s honor. The renaming of the “Millie Dunn Veasey Post Office” was to honor her work in the 6888th Central Postal Directory Battalion and "the lives she changed for the better" with her work and activism.
