= Willie Otey Kay =

African-American dressmaker (1894–1992)

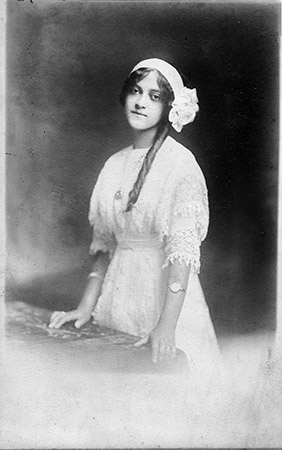
- Kay in 1910
- Born: Willie Virginia Otey; March 17, 1894; Raleigh, North Carolina, US
- Died: September 25, 1992 (aged 98); Raleigh, North Carolina, US
- Resting place: Mount Hope Cemetery; Raleigh, North Carolina, US
- Education: Shaw University
- Occupation: Dressmaker
- Spouse: John Walcott Kay (m. 1915; death 1927)
- Children: 7 (including June Kay Campbell)
- Parents: Henry Gaston Otey (father); Josephine Alston (mother)
- Relatives: Bill Campbell (grandson); Ralph Campbell Jr. (grandson)

Willie Virginia Otey Kay (March 17, 1894 – September 25, 1992) was an African-American dressmaker. She was known for making wedding dresses and debutante gowns for almost sixty years, becoming one of the most sought-after designers for women's formalwear in North Carolina. Kay began her dressmaking business during the Jim Crow Era, catering to both black and white clientele. She dressed young women being presented to society at the all-white North Carolina Debutante Ball and the all-black Alpha Kappa Alpha Debutante Ball, often attending the balls as a guest. In 1935, McCall's did a story on Kay and her work. In 1951, one of Kay's debutante gowns was featured on the cover of Life. Her work was also featured in The News & Observer and, in 2016, the North Carolina Museum of History presented an exhibit on her life. Kay was the mother of civil rights activist June Kay Campbell and the grandmother of politicians Ralph Campbell Jr. and Bill Campbell.

In 2016, the North Carolina Museum of History opened an exhibit on Kay titled Made Especially for You by Willie Kay. Her work has also been exhibited at St. Augustine's University and the National Afro-American Museum and Cultural Center.

== Early life ==
Kay was born Willie Virginia Otey on March 17, 1894, in Raleigh, North Carolina to Henry Gaston Otey and Josephine Alston Otey. She was the eldest of eight children and grew up in the family home on Cabarrus Street, near downtown Raleigh's African-American Business District. Her father was a prominent African-American businessman who owned an upscale barbershop inside the Yarborough House Hotel on Fayetteville Street. Her father's clients were white, and often political and business leaders in the state's capitol. Due to this, Kay grew up in a social and political environment.

Kay was first taught how to sew by her grandmother and mother, who were both seamstresses. She majored in home economics at Shaw University, graduating in 1912. While a student at Shaw, Kay won first prize in the school's dressmaking competition.

== Career ==
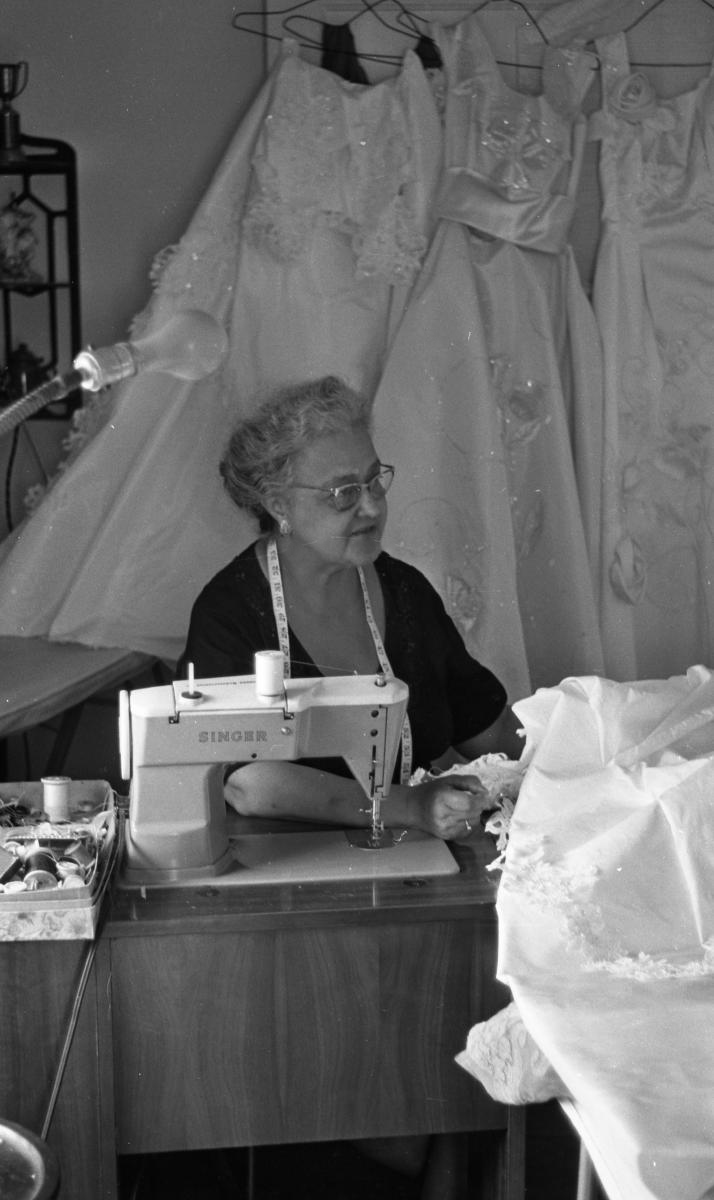
Kay in her home atelier

Kay began working as a dressmaker to support her children after the death of her husband. She set up shop as a seamstress at her family's house, so that she could work and watch after her children. She was helped by her sisters, Mildred Otey Taylor, Chloe Otey Jervay Laws, Josephine Otey Hayes, and Elizabeth Otey, who all became successful dressmakers. Kay's father advertised her business to his clients at the barber shop. Shortly after, wives and daughters of Raleigh's elite families began commissioning dresses. Despite racial segregation in North Carolina throughout the Jim Crow Era, Kay designed commissions for black and white clients. She was known for dressing debutantes who were to be presented at either the all-black Alpha Kappa Alpha Debutante Ball or the all-white North Carolina Debutante Ball and received tickets to attend both events. Kay also designed the debutante gowns for her own granddaughters. Kay was known to later convert debutante dresses into wedding dresses for clients. Some of her more prominent clients included the wives and daughters of North Carolina governors and senators, and the suffragist Addie Worth Bagley Daniels, who was the wife of newspaper publisher Josephus Daniels. Kay made christening gowns, debutante dresses, party dresses, women's evening wear, wedding dresses, clerical vestments, and bridesmaid dresses.

Kay, like the other women in her family, did not use commercial patterns. Instead, she preferred the sewing methods she had learned from family members over the techniques she studied at Shaw. She sketched her dresses first, then made muslin or paper mock-ups for client fittings. She used a Singer sewing machine for stitching seams but did detailing by hand. Her sister, Lizzie, created lace appliqués and beadwork for her. She worked with silk, lace, and satin.

In 1935, McCall's did a story on Kay and her work. In 1951, one of Kay's debutante gowns was featured on the cover of Life. Her work was also featured in The News & Observer.

== Personal life ==
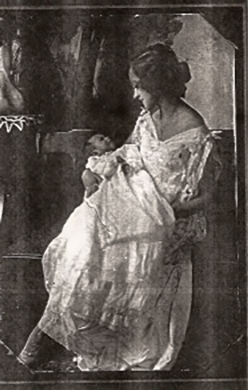
Kay holding her newborn daughter, Inez

While attending Shaw University, Kay met John Walcott Kay, a student at the university's Leonard Medical School from Weldon. They married at St. Ambrose Episcopal Church in Raleigh in 1915 and moved to Wilmington, where her husband established his medical practice and, along with six other physicians, established the Community Hospital for Blacks.

The Kays had seven children:

- Josephine Jessie Kay (1916–1918)
- Inez Otey Kay White (1918–1986)
- Gloria Clementine Kay Greene (1919–2014)
- Willie Virginia Kay (1921–1922)
- Constance Taylor Kay Journigan Wilcox (1922–1981)
- John Walcott Kay II (1923–1990)
- June Elizabeth Kay Campbell (1925–2004)

Kay's husband died on March 6, 1927, following a surgery to treat an abdominal hernia. After her husband's death, Kay relocated the family to Raleigh and took up residence in her childhood home. She was a devout Episcopalian and was a parishioner at St. Ambrose Church.

Her youngest daughter, June, married civil rights activist Ralph Campbell Sr. Kay is the grandmother of Ralph Campbell Jr., who served as North Carolina State Auditor, and of Bill Campbell, who served as Mayor of Atlanta. Her home became a refuge for her grandchildren when their home was endangered by bomb threats by those that opposed the family's civil rights work.

== Legacy ==
In 2016, the North Carolina Museum of History opened an exhibit on Kay and her work, titled Made Especially for You by Willie Kay. The exhibit included a dress worn by Doris Doscher to her son's wedding at First Baptist Church in Raleigh; a wedding gown and veil for Carolyn Dorcas Maynor; a wedding dress worn by Carolyn Cheek Palmer and later by Cathryn Cheek Zevenhuizen, an evening gown for the debutante Louise Wooten; an evening gown and overbodice worn by Kay's daughter, June, at the debut of June's daughter, Mildred Campbell; and her grandson Ralph's christening enesemble. The exhibit ran from January to September. More of Kay's designs are on display at St. Augustine's University in Raleigh and the National Afro-American Museum and Cultural Center in Ohio. A stained glass window at St. Ambrose Episcopal Church is dedicated to Kay.
