= Bill Campbell (mayor) =

American politician, mayor of Atlanta, Georgia

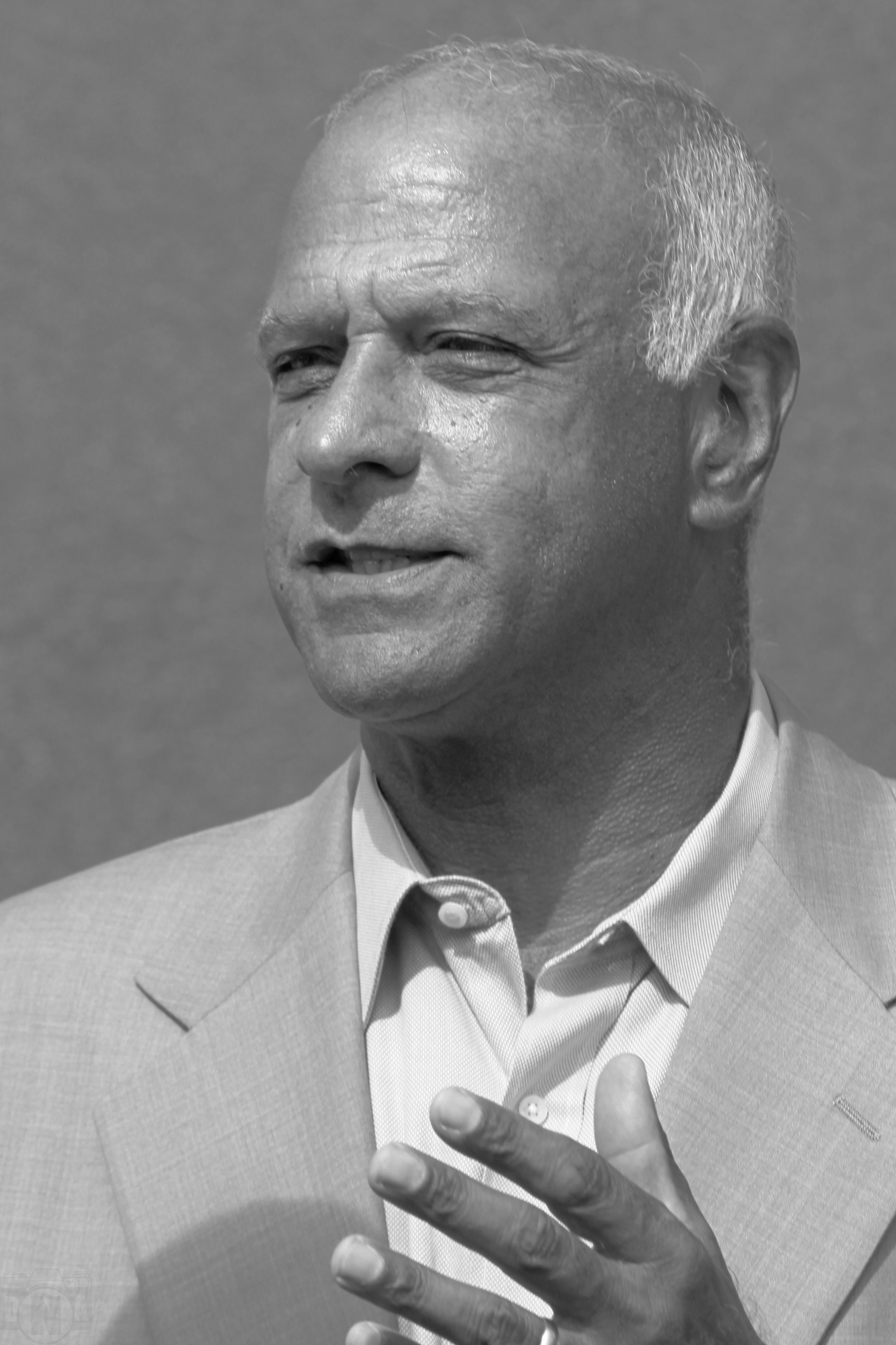
- Campbell in 2012

57th Mayor of Atlanta
- In office January 3, 1994 – January 7, 2002
- Preceded by: Maynard Jackson
- Succeeded by: Shirley Franklin

Member of the Atlanta City Council District 2
- In office 1982 – January 1994
- Preceded by: John Sweet
- Succeeded by: Debi Starnes

Personal details
- Born: William Craig Campbell; 1953 or 1954 (age 72–73) Raleigh, North Carolina, U.S.
- Party: Democratic
- Parent(s): Ralph Campbell Sr. June Kay Campbell
- Relatives: Willie Otey Kay (grandmother); John Walcott Kay (grandfather)
- Education: Vanderbilt University (BA); Duke University (JD)

William Craig Campbell (born 1953 or 1954) is an American politician, who served as the 55th Mayor of Atlanta, Georgia from January 1994–January 2002. He was the third African-American mayor in the city's history. Accused of corruption during his time in office, he was convicted for tax evasion in 2006 and spent 16 months in federal prison.

== Early life ==
On September 8, 1960 Bill Campbell was enrolled in Murphey Elementary School in Raleigh, North Carolina at the age of seven, thus becoming the first black student to attend an all-white school in Raleigh City Schools. He later recalled, "My family prepared me by simply saying this. 'This is important, and you’re going to have to do it. You’re going to have to endure it'." Campbell's parents also tried to enroll Campbell's older brother, Ralph, and his older sister but he was the only one approved for entry. Campbell was accepted by his teacher and immediate classmates, but his presence upset some of the parents of other students. Some of the older students bullied him, and his parents received bomb threats. Campbell remained the only black student at Murphey for five years. He later graduated from William G. Enloe High School.

=== University ===
Campbell received a B.A. from Vanderbilt University, and a J.D. from Duke University Law School. He is a member of Omega Psi Phi.

== Political career ==
Campbell began his political career in 1981, when he ran for and won District 2 on the Atlanta City Council in that year's election, and won re-election in 1985 and 1989.

=== Mayor of Atlanta ===
Campbell was heartily endorsed by outgoing mayor Maynard Jackson, and won the 1993 election for mayor. During his first term, his major accomplishments included overhauling the city's finance department, passing a major bond issue to pay for infrastructure improvements for the 1996 Summer Olympics, rebuilding the public housing system, and modernizing the legal, public works, and water departments. Violent crime rates also dropped significantly during his tenure. According to Douglas A. Blackmon, Campbell was seen as a "post–civil rights movement black politician who would leverage the economic rebirth of Atlanta, build a bridge to white voters, and become a U.S. senator or a Georgia governor".

Campbell subsequently fell into disfavor during his second term, despite defeating then-president of the Atlanta City Council, Marvin S. Arrington, Sr. The 1997 race was known for its emphasis on the racial overtones often not publicly seen in the African-American community, with Campbell being the lighter-skinned candidate and Arrington the darker complexioned. Campbell would later be criticized for deploying anti-Black racist messaging in an attempt to deflect criticism of his record as mayor. Campbell was succeeded by Shirley Franklin. Following his tenure as mayor, he moved to Palm Beach Gardens, Florida, where he worked as a practicing attorney. He was disbarred by order of the Supreme Court of Florida as a result of his tax evasion conviction.

=== Failure of Atlanta Empowerment Zone ===
In November 1994, the Atlanta Empowerment Zone was established, a 10-year, $250 million federal program to revitalize Atlanta's 34 poorest neighborhoods including the Bluff. Scathing reports from both the U.S. Department of Housing and Urban Development and the Georgia Department of Community Affairs revealed corruption, waste, bureaucratic incompetence, and specifically called out interference by mayor Campbell.

=== Targeting Richard Jewell ===
It was widely reported that Campbell pushed the FBI to indict someone for the Atlanta Olympics bombing, in an effort to continue the Olympics as normal. An effort that contributed to false targeting the FBI and the news media of the discoverer of the bomb Richard Jewell.

== Tax evasion conviction ==
In August 2004, Campbell retained high-profile attorney Billy Martin to defend him against several indictments by a federal grand jury on racketeering, bribery, wire fraud and tax evasion charges. The charges came from a five-year federal investigation into possible corruption during his time as Mayor of Atlanta. Campbell was later acquitted on racketeering, bribery and wire fraud charges; however, on March 10, 2006, a federal jury convicted him on three counts of tax evasion. He was sentenced by U.S. District Court Judge Richard Story to 30 months in prison for the three counts on tax evasion. He was also ordered to serve a year on probation, pay $6,000, and pay more than $60,000 in back taxes. On August 21, 2006 he reported to the Federal Correctional Institution in Miami, Florida.

Campbell was released from prison in December 2007 after receiving a shortened sentence by enrolling in a drug treatment program. This came just a short time after he told a federal judge that he was not struggling with a drug abuse problem. It was reported by The New York Times that "Prison officials said inmates must offer documentation of prior substance abuse to enter the treatment program, but for privacy reasons they said they could not disclose whether Mr. Campbell submitted such proof." Campbell's statements to the judge weren't used to determine whether or not he could enter the program.

== See also ==
- Atlanta Empowerment Zone

== Works cited ==
- Drescher, John (2000). Triumph of Good Will: How Terry Sanford Beat a Champion of Segregation in and Reshaped the South. Jackson, MS: University Press of Mississippi. ISBN 1-57806-310-8. - Read online

Political offices
Preceded by Maynard Jackson	Mayor of Atlanta; January 1994 – January 2002	Succeeded by Shirley Franklin
