= John Walcott Kay =

American physician

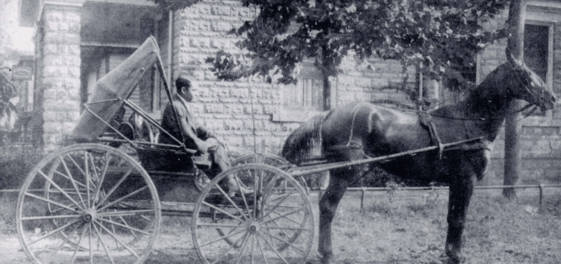
- Kay circa 1920
- Born: 1890; Weldon, North Carolina, U.S.
- Died: March 6, 1927 (aged 36–37); Wilmington, North Carolina, U.S.
- Resting place: Mount Hope Cemetery
- Education: Shaw University
- Occupation: physician
- Spouse: Willie Virginia Otey (1915–1927; his death)
- Children: 7 (including June Kay Campbell)
- Relatives: Bill Campbell (grandson); Ralph Campbell Jr. (grandson)

John Walcott Kay (1890 – 1927) was an African-American physician. He operated a medical practice in Wilmington, North Carolina and was one of the founders of the city's Community Hospital for African-Americans.

== Early life and education ==
Kay was born in Weldon, North Carolina in 1890. He attended Leonard Medical School at Shaw University in Raleigh, graduating with a medical degree in 1912.

== Career ==
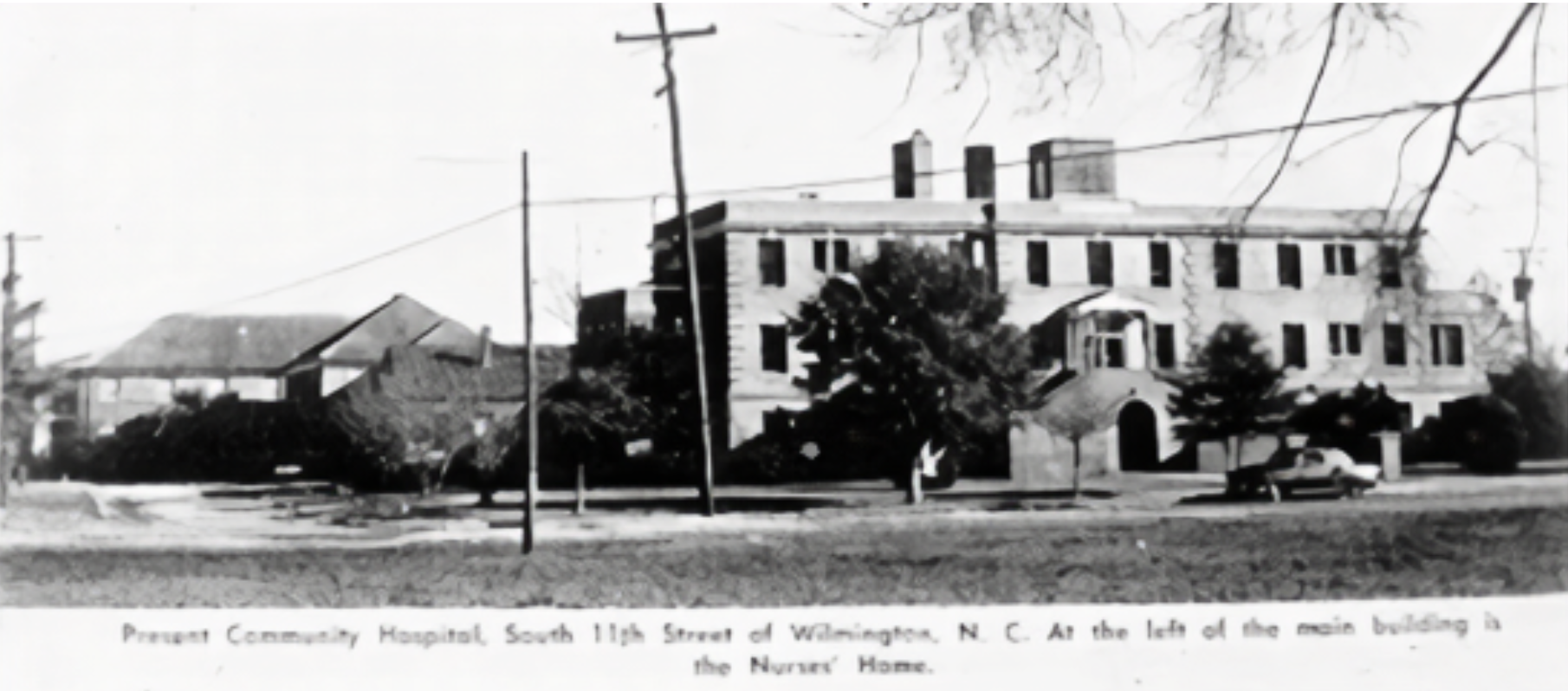
Community Hospital in Wilmington

After graduating from medical school, Kay moved to Wilmington, North Carolina to open up a medical practice. In 1921, he co-founded Community Hospital, which was the city's first hospital to exclusively serve African-American residents, alongside A. J. Wilson, Foster Burnett, Willie Blount, and Boyd Paul.

== Personal life ==
While a student at Shaw University, Kay met Willie Virginia Otey. They married in 1915. They had seven children, two of which died in infancy. One of his daughters, June, was a prominent civil rights activist. He was the grandfather of North Carolina State Auditor Ralph Campbell Jr. and Atlanta Mayor Bill Campbell. Kay had a large Neoclassical house built in Wilmington, where the family lived until his death.

He died on March 6, 1927, following an emergency surgery for a ruptured abdominal hernia, and was buried at Mount Hope Cemetery in Raleigh. His widow and children moved to Raleigh upon his death.
