= Ralph Campbell Jr. =

American politician and auditor (1946–2011)

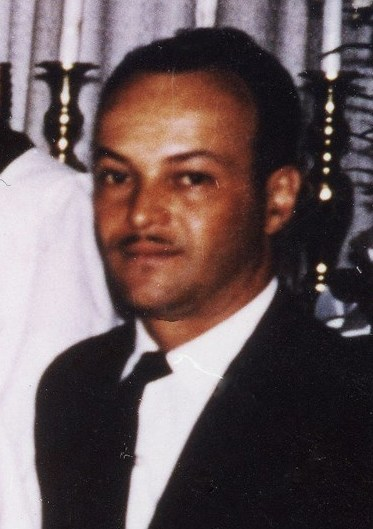
- Ralph Campbell Jr., date unknown

15th State Auditor of North Carolina
- In office January 9, 1993 – January 15, 2005
- Governor: Jim Hunt; Mike Easley
- Preceded by: Edward Renfrow
- Succeeded by: Leslie W. Merritt Jr.

Personal details
- Born: Ralph Campbell Jr. December 7, 1946 Raleigh, North Carolina, U.S.
- Died: January 11, 2011 (aged 64) Raleigh, North Carolina, U.S.
- Party: Democratic
- Parents: Ralph Campbell Sr. (father); June Kay Campbell (mother)
- Education: St. Augustine's College

Military service
- Allegiance: United States
- Branch/service: Army Reserve
- Years of service: 1971–1977

Ralph Campbell Jr. (December 7, 1946 – January 11, 2011) was an American politician and auditor who served as the North Carolina State Auditor from 1993 to 2005. A member of the Democratic Party, he was the first African American to hold statewide elected executive office in North Carolina. Campbell was born in Raleigh, North Carolina, and he attended St. Augustine's College. He graduated with a degree in business administration in 1968, and served in the United States Army Reserve from 1971 until 1977. After leaving the reserve, he worked various government jobs before being elected to the Raleigh City Council in 1985.

In 1992, Campbell ran for North Carolina State Auditor and was elected, defeating Republican Vernon Abernethy. Taking office in January 1993, he equipped office staff with desktop computers and field auditors with laptop computers during his first term and pushed for the implementation of an entirely digital auditing system. Campbell conducted several high-profile audits during his tenure, occasionally annoying government workers and other Democrats. Re-elected in 1996 and 2000, he lost a bid for a fourth term to Republican Les Merritt. Leaving office in 2005, Campbell worked as a consultant and served as treasurer of the North Carolina Democratic Party. Campbell was diagnosed with lung cancer in 2010, and he died the following year.

== Early life ==
Ralph Campbell Jr. was born on December 7, 1946, in Raleigh, North Carolina, United States to Ralph Campbell Sr. and June Kay Campbell. Both of his parents were civil rights activists. His maternal grandmother, Willie Otey Kay, was a prominent dressmaker in Raleigh and his grandfather, John Walcott Kay, was a physician in Wilmington. Ralph Jr. grew up with two brothers, Bill (who would later serve as Mayor of Atlanta) and Eddie, and one sister, Mildred. In 1960, the elder Campbells requested that the Raleigh School Board admit Ralph Jr., Mildred, and Bill to attend all-white schools. The board allowed Bill to be transferred—and thus become the first black student to attend an all-white public school in the city—but denied the applications for Ralph Jr. and Mildred, citing overcrowding at the junior high school to which they sought admission.

Campbell accompanied his father and sister to the 1963 March on Washington for Jobs and Freedom. After graduating from John W. Ligon High School in 1964, he attended St. Augustine's College, receiving a degree in business administration in 1968. He later took graduate-level business courses at North Carolina Central University.

== Early career ==
From 1971 until 1977, Campbell served in the United States Army Reserve. After leaving the reserve, he worked as a field auditor for the North Carolina Department of Revenue, and from 1986 to 1990 as a plan auditor for the State Health Benefits Office. In 1990, Campbell took an administrative job in the North Carolina Department of Insurance, holding the job until 1992. In 1985, Campbell was elected to the Raleigh City Council, assuming office on December 3. He was re-elected in 1987, 1989, and 1991. In the city council, he chaired the Law and Finance Committee and Intergovernmental Committee from 1985 to 1989 and served as mayor pro tempore in his final full term from 1989 to 1991. He resigned from the council effective January 1, 1993.

== North Carolina State Auditor ==
=== Election and first term ===
Campbell decided to run for the office of North Carolina State Auditor in 1992, declaring his candidacy in January. Facing two other candidates in the Democratic Party's primary election, he took a leave of absence from his job in the Department of Insurance and travelled across the state to hold meetings and rallies. He won the May 5 primary, securing the Democratic nomination with 48 percent of the vote, and faced Republican Vernon Abernethy in the general election. Campbell pledged that if he was elected he would create an advisory council for the office and establish a technical assistance program to educate officials in other state agencies on cost-controlling methods. Abernethy emphasized his Certified Public Accountant status and criticized Campbell for lacking accounting experience. Campbell won the general election on November 3, saying, "How sweet it is to be standing with my fellow North Carolinians on the edge of tomorrow [...] We have chosen hope over fear." His victory made him the first black person ever elected to a statewide executive office in North Carolina.

Campbell was sworn in as North Carolina State Auditor on January 9, 1993. During his first term he equipped office staff with desktop computers and field auditors with laptop computers and pushed for the implementation of an entirely digital auditing system. He served as head of the state's Information Resource Management Commission and helped determine its policy towards the internet and later reviewed the government's response to the Year 2000 problem. In May 1995 he was involved in a car accident while driving his government-issued vehicle. Campbell was initially charged with driving while impaired, but the police later determined that his blood alcohol content was lower than the level necessary for such a case and dropped the charges while also finding the driver of the other vehicle at fault for the collision.

Ralph Campbell ran for re-election in 1996, pledging that if he re-secured his office he would continue to enhance its technological capabilities. He was challenged by Republican candidate Jack Daly, a law student. Daly and his campaign official, Nate Pendley, accused Campbell of misusing his state vehicle and criticized him for the 1995 collision, saying he should resign from office. Campbell rejected the allegations. He ultimately won re-election with less than 50 percent of the vote, receiving the fewest votes among the Democratic candidates on the Council of State.

=== Second term and re-election ===
Campbell conducted several high-profile audits during his tenure, occasionally annoying government workers and other Democrats. He released a critical audit of North Carolina's mental health services in early 2000, for which he received broad praise, and the report led to the creation of a legislative panel to study the matter. In June he audited the expenses of State Attorney General Mike Easley, who used official funds to pay for public service announcements. The audit cleared Easley of any wrongdoing, but Campbell was accused of protecting Easley by his political opponents, since Easley was a candidate for governor.

For the 2000 Democratic primary contest for state auditor, Pendley recruited a homeless man and client of Daly, Kenneth Campbell, to challenge Ralph Campbell for the nomination. Daly filed Kenneth Campbell's candidacy and paid the associated fees. Daly renewed his candidacy for the auditor's office, and sponsored another former client to run in the primary. Ralph Campbell stated that Kenneth had been deceived, and the latter's candidacy was invalidated by election officials after one asserted that the move was done to confuse voters in the primary. Campbell attended the 2000 Democratic National Convention as a delegate. For his own 2000 campaign, he collected a significant amount of his campaign contributions from Atlanta-area donors, where his brother Bill was serving as mayor. His Republican opponent in the general election, Les Merritt, attempted to tie Ralph Campbell to a federal corruption investigation into Atlanta's city government and turned over his campaign financial disclosures to the Federal Bureau of Investigation. Campbell's campaign officials denied any wrongdoing. He won his third term over Merritt in November with 51 percent of the vote.

=== Third term and election defeat ===
In late 2001 Campbell accused the North Carolina Technological Development Authority, a nonprofit designed to promote small technology companies, of wasting its money on frivolous travel and entertainment expenses and excessive salaries. As a result, Easley—who was governor—cut off the organization from state funds and it later filed for bankruptcy. In May 2001, the auditor's office began exploring the cybersecurity vulnerabilities of state computer networks. In December 2002 Campbell was elected president of the National Electronic Commerce Coordinating Council. The following year his office reported on the John A. Hyman Foundation, a nonprofit founded by Congressman Frank Ballance, accusing it of financial improprieties. The audit led to state and federal investigations, and as a result the auditor's office lobbied for increased oversight into nonprofits which received state funds, including the implementation of new financial reporting requirements and the hiring of additional auditors. Following an audit of state juvenile justice facilities, the Department of Juvenile Justice and Delinquency Prevention adopted one of Campbell's recommendations and declared that it would create task forces to review the department's reporting and investigative procedures for incidents of abuse.

In March 2004 Campbell released an audit of the North Carolina State Ports Authority which led its chief executive officer to resign and the board of directors to revise its rules regarding credit cards and travel expenses. The following month the auditor's office released a report which accused the North Carolina Medicaid program of misallocating $414 million in federal funding. Campbell sent the audit to state and federal prosecutors for review, and said, "This is the most damaging audit that we have ever had to release in my 11, 12 years as state auditor." The audit led to a public dispute between Campbell and Secretary of the North Carolina Department of Health and Human Services Carmen Hooker Odom. Odom denounced the findings during a North Carolina General Assembly committee hearing, asserted that what problems existed would have been fixed if Campbell had followed-up on issues his office discovered in 1997, and stated that she wished to return to the "very good relationship" she had with Campbell before the release of the audit. Campbell followed her presentation by saying, "Let me thank the secretary for her magnanimous gesture of working together as I pull the daggers and the arrows out of my back from the beginning part of that presentation." His comment elicited gasps from the audience, and after he summarized the report, the legislators intensively questioned Odom on the spending of the Medicaid funds. In June he was elected president of the National State Auditors Association.

Merrit challenged Campbell again for the auditor's office in the 2004 election. He criticized Campbell for not fully uncovering the Medicaid problems in 1997. The North Carolina Republican Party attacked Campbell's connections to his brother Bill, who had been indicted in the course of the federal investigation in Atlanta on corruption charges. Campbell lost re-election in November, with Merritt receiving about 28,000 more votes. Campbell believed that his race and some of his audits played a role in his electoral defeat. His office performed about 3,600 audits during his tenure. His tenure ended on January 15, 2005. Another black person was not elected to serve on the Council of State until Mark Robinson was elected Lieutenant Governor of North Carolina in 2020.

== Later life ==
In March 2005 Campbell became treasurer of the North Carolina Democratic Party. He endorsed Beth Wood, a former employee in the state auditor's office, as the Democratic candidate to challenge Merritt in the 2008 election. After leaving office, Campbell worked as a consultant. In 2010 he was diagnosed with lung cancer. He was admitted to the Duke Raleigh Hospital in January 2011 and died on January 11. Following his death, his body lay in state in the State Capitol rotunda. Governor Beverly Perdue also ordered that all North Carolina flags at state facilities were to be flown at half-staff in his honor. Perdue stated, "His entire life Ralph Campbell was a gift to the people of North Carolina." A funeral was held at St. Ambrose Church in Raleigh on January 15 and he was subsequently buried. On December 7, a library in Raleigh was dedicated in his honor.

Party political offices
Preceded by Ed Renfrow	Democratic nominee for North Carolina State Auditor; 1992, 1996, 2000, 2004	Succeeded by Beth Wood
Political offices
Preceded by Edward Renfrow	Auditor of North Carolina; 1993–2005	Succeeded by Leslie W. Merritt Jr.
