= June Kay Campbell =

American civil rights activist

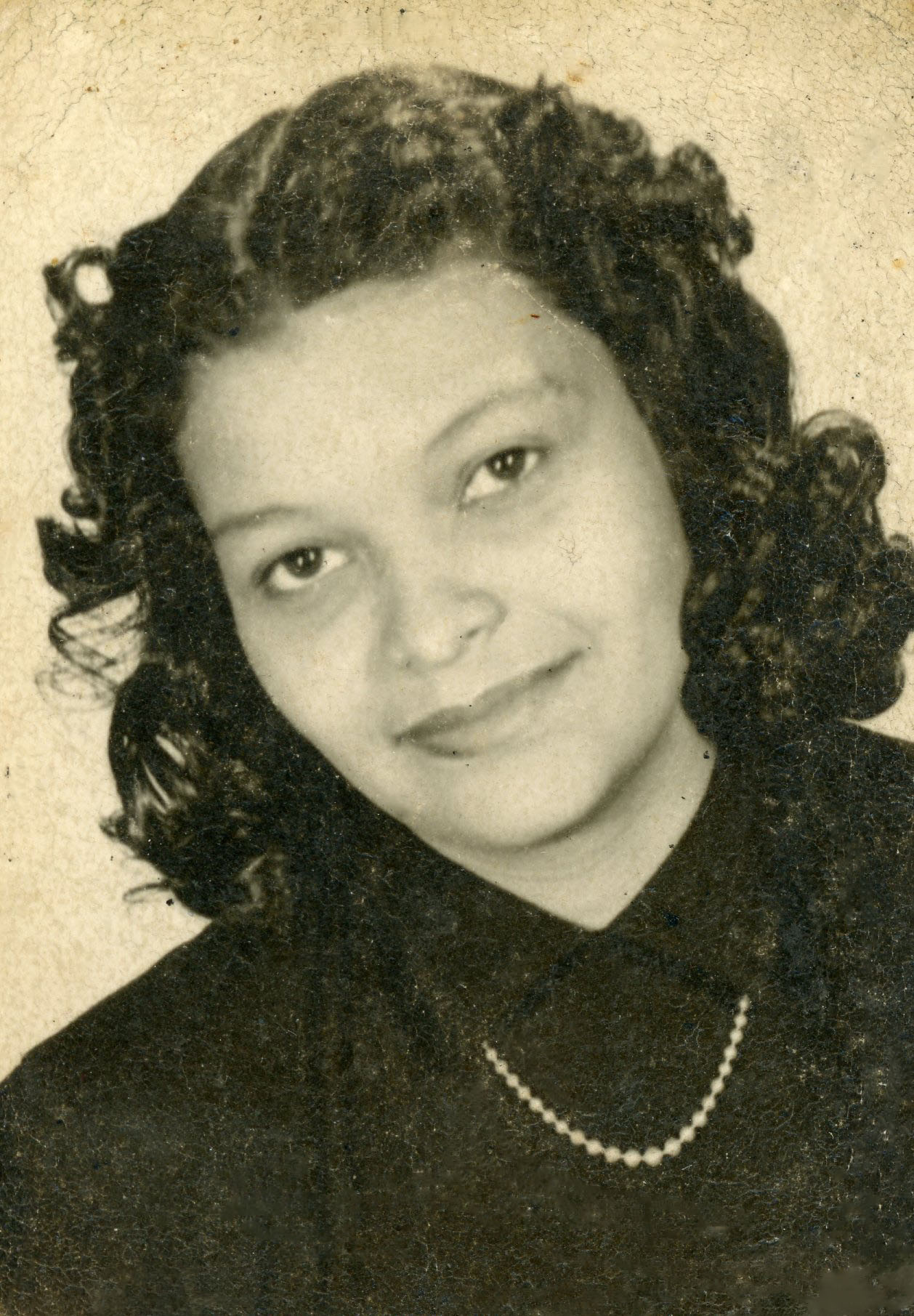
- Born: June Elizabeth Kay; August 19, 1925; Raleigh, North Carolina, U.S.
- Died: August 19, 2004 (aged 79); Raleigh, North Carolina, U.S.
- Education: Washington Graded and High School; Shaw University; North Carolina State University
- Occupations: political activist, secretary
- Spouse: Ralph Campbell Sr.
- Children: 4 (including Bill Campbell and Ralph Campbell Jr.)
- Parent(s): John Walcott Kay; Willie Otey Kay

June Elizabeth Kay Campbell (August 19, 1925 – August 19, 2004) was an American civil rights activist and administrative secretary.

== Early life ==
June Elizabeth Kay Campbell was born on August 19, 1925, in Wilmington, North Carolina, the seventh child of Dr. John Walcott Kay and Willie Otey Kay. Educated in Raleigh Public Schools, she graduated from Washington Graded and High School in 1944. She later attended classes at Shaw University and North Carolina State University. She married Ralph Campbell Sr. on January 1, 1946. They had four children: Ralph Jr., Mildred, Bill, and Eddie.

== Career and activism ==
Campbell worked as an administrative secretary at Saint Augustine's College. Campbell and her husband petitioned the Raleigh School Board to allow their children to attend white schools. The board agreed to allow Bill, a younger child, to enroll at the Murphey School, making him the first child to desegregate a school in the city. June took Bill to the Murphey School on his first day of classes on September 7, 1960. The News & Observer photographed the two of them, and she told her son as they entered the school, "Hold your head up high and just count the steps." Campbell accompanied her son to the school multiple times thereafter.

In the early 1960s, partly as a result of their efforts to enroll their children in traditionally segregated schools, June and Ralph began hosting meetings of civil rights activists at their home. Often sitting around an oval-shaped glass-topped table which June had purchased, this group became known as the "Oval Table Gang". Its members strategized to desegregate schools, support black political candidates, and organized protests. June often prepared food for them. The meetings continued until Ralph died in 1983. Bill was later elected Mayor of Atlanta, while Ralph Jr. was elected Auditor of North Carolina.

== Later life ==
Campbell retired from her secretary job in February 1992 to care for her mother. When Bill ran for office in Atlanta in 1993, she moved there for several months to take care of his home and children while he and his wife campaigned. She returned during his reelection campaign. Campbell also involved herself in several civic organizations after her retirement. She was diagnosed with pancreatic cancer in March 2004 and died due to complications stemming from the disease on August 19. The Campbells' oval table was later acquired by the North Carolina Museum of History, and in 2005 June and her husband were inducted into the Raleigh Hall of Fame. Saint Augustine's College named an annual woman's leadership conference in her honor. The North Carolina General Assembly commended her for her work.

== Works cited ==
- Suttell, Brian (2023). Campus to Counter : Civil Rights Activism in Raleigh and Durham, North Carolina 1960–1963. Macon: Mercer University Press. ISBN 978-0-88146-877-9.
