= Ralph Campbell Sr. =

American civil rights activist

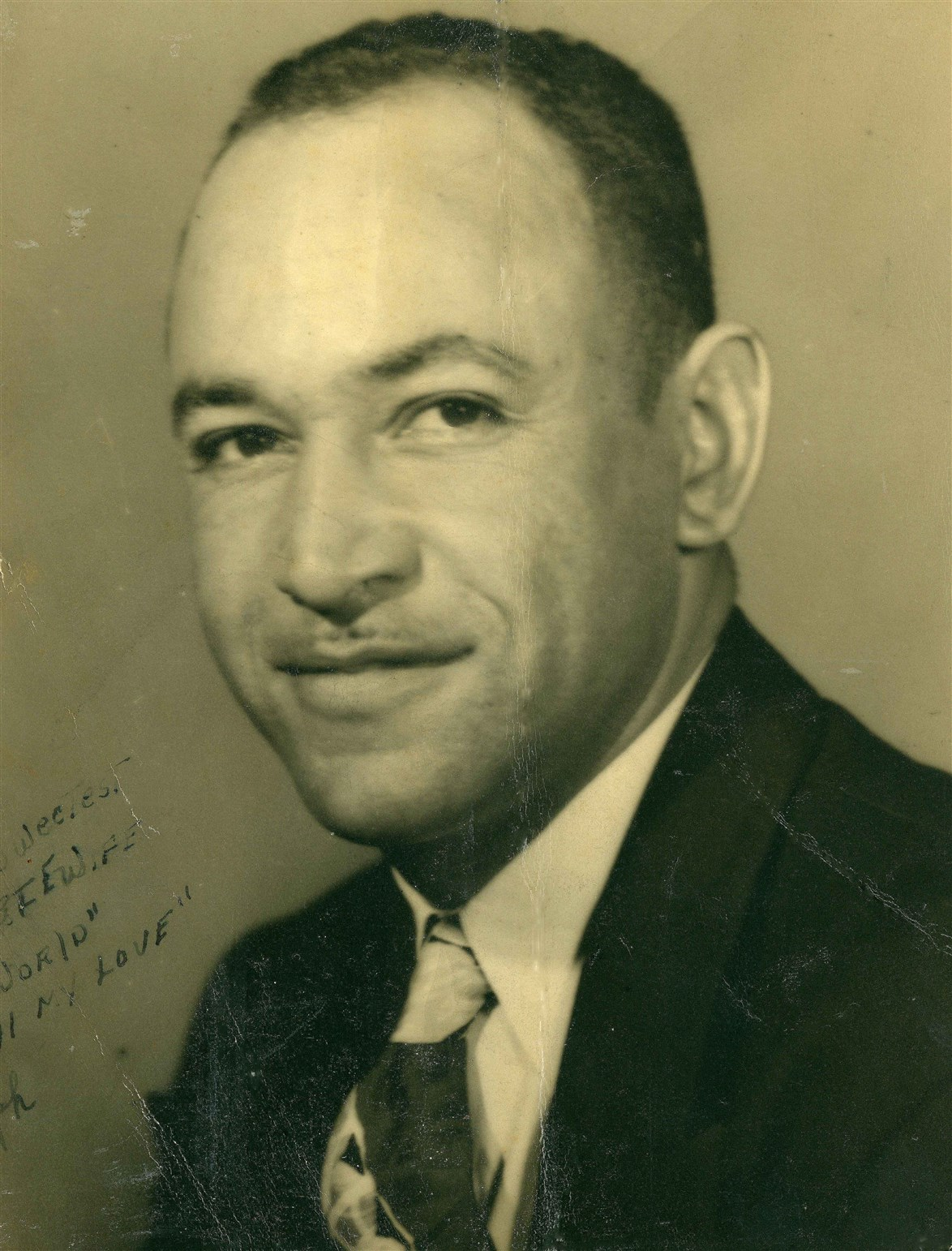

President of the NAACP Raleigh Chapter
- In office December 18, 1960 – February 21, 1965

Personal details
- Born: 1915
- Died: May 15, 1983 (aged 67–68)
- Party: Democratic
- Spouse: June Elizabeth Kay
- Children: 4 (including Bill Campbell and Ralph Campbell Jr.)
- Profession: civil rights activist, postal worker

Ralph Campbell Sr. (1915 – May 15, 1983) was an American postal worker, civil rights activist, and organizer in Raleigh, North Carolina. His wife June was also influential. He worked for the post office. Their son Ralph Campbell Jr. continued their work and was elected state auditor. Another son, Bill Campbell, served as mayor of Atlanta.

== Early life ==
Ralph Campbell was born in 1915. He served in World War II and in the Korean War. Afterwards, he secured a job with the U.S. Postal Service. He married June Elizabeth Kay on January 1, 1946. They had four children: Ralph Jr., Mildred, Bill, and Eddie.

== Career ==
Campbell served as president of the Raleigh Chapter of the National Association for the Advancement of Colored People from December 18, 1960 until February 21, 1965.

In 1960, Campbell and his wife petitioned the Raleigh School Board to allow their son Bill to attend the all-white Murphey Elementary Schools and for Ralph Jr. and Mildred to attend the all-white Morson Junior High School for the 1960–1961 school year. The board allowed Bill to be transferred—and thus become the first black student to attend an all-white public school in the city—but denied the applications for Ralph Jr. and Mildred, citing overcrowding at Morson. While pleased with the decision to allow Bill to attend Murphey, Campbell expressed his frustration to the school board that his other children's applications were denied, saying, "To assign a child at any time to a segregated school is in violation of the constitution and the Supreme Court decision of 1954." As a result of their push for their child to enroll in a white school, the Campbells faced death threats and briefly lived with relatives to ensure their safety. As Campbell was unable to leave his job at the post office, his wife June escorted Bill to Murphey Elementary on his first day of schooling there.

Meadowbrook Country Club in Garner, NC, was founded in 1958 (with initial construction and major improvements occurring in 1959). It was built as one of the first African-American-owned country clubs in the United States. It was founded by a group of African-American businessmen, including Ralph Campbell, Sr, M. Grant Batey, James J. Samson Jr., and Paul Jervay

In the early 1960s, Campbell and his wife began hosting meetings of civil rights activists at their home. Often sitting around an oval glass-topped table, this group became known as the "Oval Table Gang". Its members strategized to desegregate schools, support black political candidates, and organized protests. The meetings continued until Campbell died. He participated in the 1963 March on Washington for Jobs and Freedom, taking two of his children with him.

In 1970, Campbell became president of the Raleigh-Wake Citizens Association. He resigned from the post in 1978. He retook the position in the 1982 and held it until his death.

In November 1982, Campbell campaigned for the reelection of U.S. Representative Ike Franklin Andrews, helping him win support from the local black community. After the election, Andrews hired him as a part-time staffer in his local congressional office.

== Later life and legacy ==
On May 12, 1983, Campbell suffered a heart attack while working at Andrew's congressional office in Cary and was taken to Wake Medical Center in Raleigh for treatment. On May 15, 1983, while in the hospital, he suffered an additional heart attack and died shortly thereafter. A requiem was held for him at St. Ambrose Church in Raleigh three days later. His body was subsequently buried at the Raleigh National Cemetery.

After his death he was commemorated in a joint resolution by the North Carolina General Assembly. His wife died in 2004. In 2005, he and his wife were inducted into the Raleigh Hall of Fame.

== Works cited ==
- Suttell, Brian (2023). Campus to Counter : Civil Rights Activism in Raleigh and Durham, North Carolina 1960–1963. Macon: Mercer University Press. ISBN 978-0-88146-877-9.
