= African Americans in Atlanta =

African Americans living in Atlanta, USA

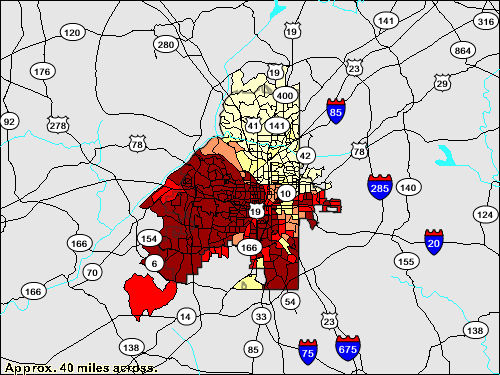
- Dark red indicates that the area was over 90% African American in 2005.

Total population
- 2,120,112

Regions with significant populations
- Throughout Atlanta and its suburbs

Languages
- Southern American English, African-American English, African-American Vernacular English, American English

Religion
- Black Protestant, irreligion

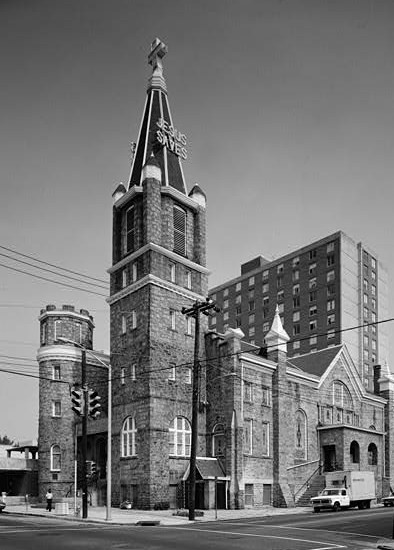
African American church in Atlanta

Black Atlantans form a major population group in the Atlanta metropolitan area, encompassing both those of African-American ancestry as well as those of recent Caribbean or African origin. Atlanta has long been known as a center of Black entrepreneurship, higher education, political activism and culture; a cradle of the Civil Rights Movement.

In 2025 the Black alone population is estimated to represent 46% of the total Atlanta city population, an increase of 6% compared to 2020. As of 2020, Metropolitan Atlanta contained the second-largest Black population in the United States, following New York. This represented a nearly five-fold numerical increase from 1970, when Metro Atlanta had the 13th-largest Black population in the nation. In 2010 Metro Atlanta's Black population modestly surpassed that of Chicago, with the gap widening as of the 2020 Census. As per the 2023 American Community Survey's 1-Year Estimates, Metro Atlanta had 2,120,112 residents identified as Black alone and 2,302,073 residents identified as either Black alone or Black in combination with other races.

== Demographics ==
Changes to the Black population of the city of Atlanta from 2000 to 2010 are illustrated here:

Pop. 2010	% of total 2010	Pop. 2000	% of total 2000	absolute change 2000–2010	% change 2000–2010
226,894	54.0%	255,689	61.4%	-31,678	-12.3%

From 2000 to 2010 Atlanta saw significant shifts in the racial composition of its neighborhoods. (See: Demographics of Atlanta: Race and ethnicity by neighborhood) There was a decrease in the Black population in the following areas:

- In NPU W (East Atlanta, Grant Park, Ormewood Park, Benteen Park), the Black population went from 57.6% to 38.0%, and the white proportion rose from 36.5% to 54.8%
- In NPU O (Edgewood, Kirkwood, East Lake area), the Black population went from 86.2% to 58.7%, and the white proportion rose from 11.3% to 36.9%.
- In NPU L (English Avenue, Vine City), the Black proportion of the population went down from 97.5% to 89.1%, while the white proportion rose from 1.3% to 6.1%. Note that there many infill residential units were added in the King Plow Arts Center area, which falls under English Avenue but which in character is an extension of the Marietta Street Artery and West Midtown.
- In NPU D, stretching from West Midtown along the border of Buckhead and northwestern Atlanta, westward towards the river, the white proportion rose from 49.3% to 59.2% with the Black proportion dropping from 36.5% to 23.9%

While there was an increasing Black population in these areas:

- In NPU X (Metropolitan Parkway corridor), the Black proportion of the population rose from 59.5% to 83.2%, while the white, Asian and Hispanic proportion dropped about three percentage points each.
- NPU B (central Buckhead) became more diverse, with the white proportion dropping from 82.8% to 75.5%, the Black proportion rising from 5.9% to 12.3%, and the Asian proportion from 3.1% to 5.3%

In Metro Atlanta, Black Americans are the largest racial minority at 32.4% of the population, up from 28.9% in 2000. From 2000 to 2010, the geographic distribution of Blacks in Metro Atlanta changed significantly. Long concentrated in the city of Atlanta and DeKalb County, the Black population there dropped while over half a million African Americans settled across other parts of the metro area, including approximately 112,000 in Gwinnett County, 71,000 in Fulton outside Atlanta, 58,000 in Cobb, 50,000 in Clayton, 34,000 in Douglas, and 27,000 each in Newton and Rockdale Counties.

Year	Black pop. in City of Atlanta	Black pop. in DeKalb County	Total Black pop. Atlanta + DeKalb	Total Black pop. Metro Atlanta	Proportion of Black pop. in Atlanta + DeKalb
2000	255,689	361,111	616,800	1,189,179	51.9%
2010	226,894	375,697	602,591	1,707,913	35.2%
2020	246,906	407,451	641,923	2,186,815	29.4%

According to U.S. census data, the Atlanta area has the second-largest population of Blacks, only behind the New York City area. The Atlanta area surpassed the Chicago area in 2010 for the second-largest Black population.

There is a Black Jamaican community in Atlanta. Jamaicans are concentrated in Stone Mountain, Decatur, Lithonia and Snellville. There is also a Black Haitian community in Atlanta.

African-born Blacks in Atlanta are mostly from Eritrea, Ethiopia, Ghana, Somalia, Liberia, Kenya and Nigeria.

Many suburbs of Atlanta such as south and western suburbs including Henry County, Stone Mountain, Fayetteville, and Douglasville house a fast growing Black population.

According to LendingTree, 11.3% of businesses in Atlanta are Black-owned, which is the highest rate in the United States.

More than 11,000 Black millionaires live in Atlanta.

== Political activism ==
In 1870, William Finch and George Graham became the first African Americans to be elected to the Atlanta Board of Aldermen (now the Atlanta City Council), and no other until the election of Q. V. Williamson to the Board in 1966. Since 1973, Atlanta has consistently elected Black mayors, and two in particular have been prominent on the national stage, Andrew Young and Maynard Jackson. Jackson was elected with the support of the predominantly white business community, including the chairmen of Coca-Cola, Citizens & Southern National Bank, the Trust Company of Georgia, and architect and Peachtree Center developer John Portman. They were hopeful that a new progressive coalition would be forged between downtown and City Hall; but they were not prepared for the level of support for the goals of the Black community that the mayor provided through support for minority-based businesses and for neighborhood-based organizations.

Carolyn Long Banks became the first Black woman to serve on the Atlanta City Council in 1980.

The Metro Atlanta counties of: Fulton, DeKalb, Cobb, Gwinnett, Clayton, Rockdale, Newton, Henry, and Douglas are each governed by a county commission that is chaired by an African- American. The position of chair is elected countywide. The remaining district level members of each respective county commission are also majority African-American.

Since then, there has been "a sometimes uneasy partnership between Black political clout and White financial power that has helped Atlanta move closer to its goal of becoming a world-class city."

== Higher education ==
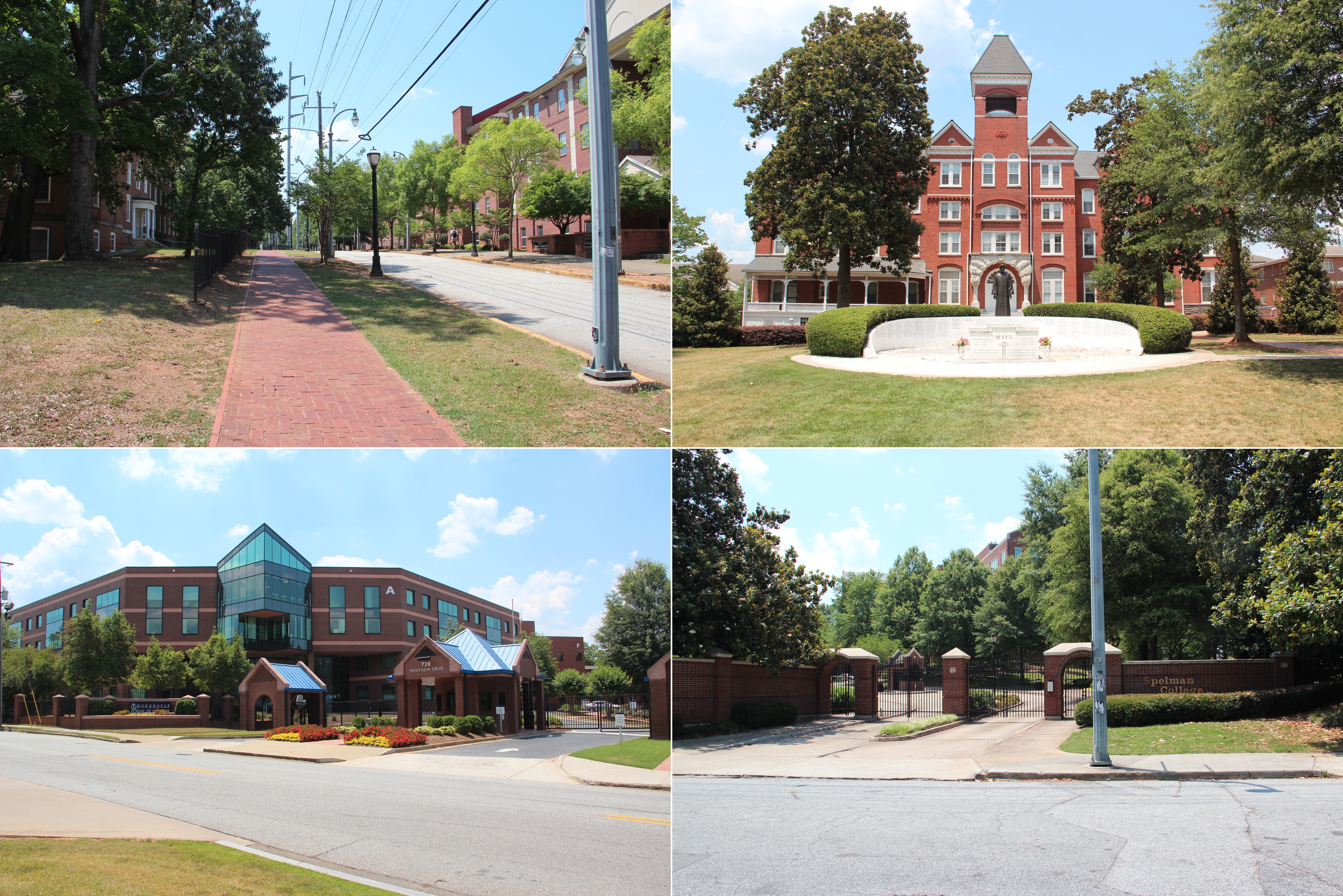
Atlanta University Center

Atlanta is home to the Atlanta University Center (AUC), the nation's oldest and largest contiguous consortium of historically Black colleges, comprising Clark Atlanta University, Morehouse College, Spelman College, Morehouse School of Medicine, and Interdenominational Theological Center. The first of these colleges were established shortly after the Civil War and have made Atlanta one of the historic centers of Black intellectualism and empowerment.

Many of the nation's most accomplished African Americans matriculated through the AUC. See: Morehouse College alumni; Clark Atlanta University alumni; Spelman College alumnae

Morris Brown College is the first institution of higher learning in Georgia founded by African-Americans.

Atlanta Metropolitan State College is a predominately Black institution.

Clayton State University (CSU) is a historically white public institution 15 miles south of Atlanta that has been predominately Black since the mid-2000s. In 2021, CSU appointed its first Black president.

Georgia Gwinnett College is a formerly predominately white public institution 30 miles northeast of Atlanta that has been mostly Black since the late 2010s.

The Atlanta's John Marshall Law School is a historically white private law school that became Georgia's only mostly Black law school in the mid-2010s. In 2020, the law school hired its first Black dean.

Emory University has one of the oldest African-American studies departments in the nation. It began in 1971 and has expanded since its inception.

The Georgia Institute of Technology consistently ranks among the top five institutions in the nation to produce the most Black engineers at the bachelor's, master's, and doctoral levels.

Georgia State University (GSU) is a historically white public institution that since the 2010s has had a Black plurality, with more Black students enrolled than any other non-profit university in the nation. GSU is the second-largest university in Georgia and leads the nation in producing the most Black college graduates with bachelor's degrees annually. In 2021, GSU appointed its first Black president.

== Upper class ==
Atlanta has a well-organized Black upper class which exerts its power in politics, business and academia, and historically, in the religious arena. Mayors Maynard Jackson and Andrew Young were representative of the upper, not working class, and rose to national standing. The Black academic community is the largest of any US city's because of the presence of the Atlanta University Center (AUC), a consortium of six historically Black colleges (HBCUs). In business, Atlanta is home to the nation's largest Black-owned insurance company (Atlanta Life), real-estate development firm (H.J. Russell) as well as some of the country's top Black-owned investment and law firms, car dealerships, and food service companies. An old-guard Black elite, graduated from AUC schools and whose status dates back to the glory days of Sweet Auburn or before, guards its social circles from "new" Black money—families such as Herndon, Yates, Bond, Milton, Yancey, Blayton, Rucker, Aikens, Harper, Cooper, Dobbs and Scott. The First Congregational Church is their church of choice.

The concentration of a Black elite in Atlanta can be explained by:

- the early establishment of Black colleges in the city immediately after the Civil War, producing graduates who remained in the city as leaders
- the high proportion of Blacks in the general population (as compared to New York or Chicago), providing a large market for goods and services
- After the 1906 Atlanta Race Riot, Blacks removed their businesses from downtown Atlanta to seek safety; during the same period, explicit segregationist legislation was introduced, which had the effect of producing a concentrated and dynamic separate Black business community in the refuges of Sweet Auburn and the area around Ashby Street (now Rev. Dr. Joseph E. Lowery Boulevard).

In the 1920s, Hunter Street (now Martin Luther King Drive) and Collier Heights became the Black elite neighborhoods of choice, while today areas in far southwest of the city around Camp Creek Marketplace, neighborhoods such as Niskey Lake, are also popular. Upper-class Black Americans also reside in Eastern Atlanta in Dekalb County which is the second richest predominantly Black county in the country.

== Black mecca ==
A Black mecca is a city to which African Americans, particularly professionals, are drawn to live, due to some or all of the following factors:

- superior economic opportunities for Blacks, often as assessed by the presence of a large Black upper-middle and upper class
- Black political activism in a city
- leading Black educational institutions in a city
- a city's leading role in Black arts, music, and other culture
- harmonious Black-white race relations in a city

Atlanta has been referred to as a Black mecca since the 1970s.

== Culture and recreation ==
The National Black Arts Festival has been based in Atlanta since the late 1980s. Throughout the year, the festival features performing arts, literature and visual arts produced by creative artists of African descent.

The New Black Wall Street, opened in 2021, was a 125,000-square-foot marketplace in Stonecrest that housed over 100 Black merchants and entertainment. The marketplace was inspired by the popular Black business district that was based in Tulsa, Oklahoma. The New Black Wall Street closed in April 2026, due to low interest and operational issues.

The Black Music & Entertainment Walk of Fame opened in 2021 near the Mercedes-Benz Stadium.

Edgewood Avenue is a popular destination for African Americans in the city. The area has a notable concentration of Black-owned bars, restaurants, churches, and other businesses.

The Atlanta Jazz Festival in Piedmont Park is one of the largest free jazz festivals in the country and features mostly Black artists. The annual event is hosted by the City of Atlanta Office of Cultural Affairs.

The A3C Festival & Conference is an annual fall event that mostly highlights African-American artists, creatives, innovators, activists, and entrepreneurs.

The One Musicfest is an annual summer Hip-Hop/R&B concert held in Atlanta.

House in the Park is a major house music festival held in Grant Park every Labor Day weekend.

The Gathering Spot is a popular networking and social club composed of primarily millennial college-educated African-Americans.

The Sweet Auburn Music Festival is a large free outdoor Black music event that place every fall in the historic Sweet Auburn district.

The Taste of Soul Atlanta is a four-day annual summer event that celebrates soul food and African-American culture.

Atlanta Black Restaurant Week is an annual event that highlights and celebrates the unique contributions of Black-owned restaurants and Black culinary professionals to the city's food scene.

The HBCU Alumni Alliance 5K Run/Walk is an annual summer fundraising event in Atlanta.

The Black Writers Weekend annual conference is based in Atlanta as of 2014. The conference is the nation's only entertainment award show and gathering for Black creatives in publishing, film and TV enthusiasts.

The Atlanta Funkfest is an annual soul and R&B concert held in the summer.

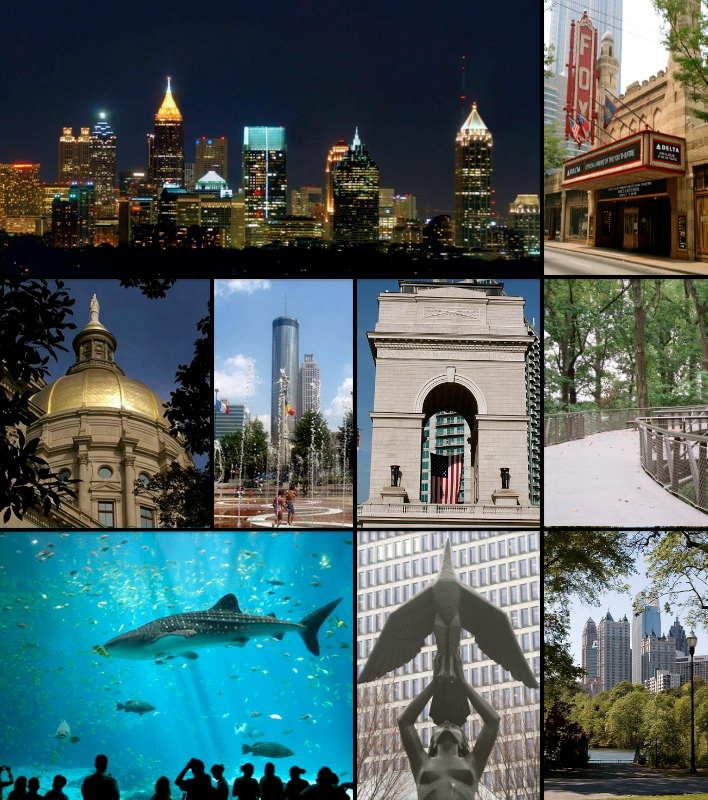
Atlanta montage

The Juneteenth Atlanta Parade & Music Festival is one of the largest annual Juneteenth events in the nation.

The Auburn Avenue Research Library on African American Culture and History opened in 1994 and is located in the Sweet Auburn Historic District.

There are several Black-owned and operated comedy clubs and productions in the Atlanta area. Uptown Comedy Corner is one of the oldest Black comedy clubs in the nation.

In 2009, The New York Times noted that after 2000, Atlanta moved "from the margins to becoming hip-hop's center of gravity, part of a larger shift in hip-hop innovation to the South." Producer Drumma Boy called Atlanta "the melting pot of the South". Producer Fatboi called the Roland TR-808 ("808") synthesizer "central" to the music of Atlanta's versatility, used for snap, crunk, trap, and pop rap styles. The same article named Drumma Boy, Fatboi, Shawty Redd and Zaytoven the four "hottest producers driving the city".

Black theater companies include True Colors, Jomandi Productions and Atlanta Black Theatre Festival.

The MEAC/SWAC Challenge is an annual historically Black college football game showcasing a teams from the Mid-Eastern Athletic Conference (MEAC) and Southwestern Athletic Conference (SWAC). The game moved to the Georgia State Stadium in 2018.

The Celebration Bowl is the only HBCU football bowl game in the nation. The bowl game provides a match-up between the champions of the Mideastern Athletic Conference and the Southwestern Athletic Conference in the Mercedes-Benz Stadium.

The annual Black College Football Hall of Fame ceremony is held in Atlanta. The event founded by Grambling State University alumni and NFL greats Doug Williams and James Harris, honors extraordinary football players who played at historically Black institutions.

The annual Bronner Bros. International Beauty Show is the largest in the world that primarily focuses on Black women.

The annual Taliah Waajid World Natural Hair Show bills itself as the world's largest natural Black hair show and conference.

The Curl, Kinks, and Culture (CKC) Festival held annually in Atlanta is an event focused on celebrating natural Black hairstyles and culture.

Atlanta has been deemed America's "Black Soccer Capital" due to the emerging presence of Black Atlantans supporting the city's MLS team Atlanta United.

Atlanta has one of the highest numbers of independent Black-owned bookstores, and is one of the top destinations for readers of African-American literature.

The annual Spelman College-Morehouse College parallel homecoming week better known as "SpelHouse Homecoming" attracts over 25,000 of alumni and visitors. Clark Atlanta's annual homecoming week also attracts thousands of alumni and visitors to Atlanta.

The Atlanta Black Pride celebration is one of the largest in the world for Black LGBT people. Historically, the event attracts nearly 100,000 participants. Atlanta has one of the highest concentrations of Black, openly LGBT people in the world.

=== Museums ===
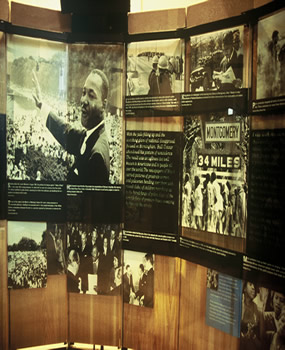
Courage to Lead exhibit at the Visitor Center of the Martin Luther King Jr. National Historical Park

Only New York City rivals Atlanta in the number of museums about Black history, art and cultural heritage. The King Historic Site and APEX Museum are in the Sweet Auburn area just east of Downtown: John Wesley Dobbs called "Sweet" Auburn Avenue "the richest Negro street in the world" in the early 20th century. Most other African American museums are within walking distance of each other on the Atlanta University Center campus or in nearby West End, a neighborhood of Victorian houses which has become the center of the Afrocentric movement in Atlanta.

- The Martin Luther King Jr. National Historical Park includes a museum chronicling the civil rights movement, the preserved boyhood home of Dr. King, the church where he pastored, and his final resting place.
- Herndon Home is the mansion of Alonzo Franklin Herndon, a rags-to-riches hero who was born into slavery, and went on to become Atlanta's first Black millionaire.
- Hammonds House Museum of African American fine art. Located in a historic Queen Anne-style house; celebrates the culture of the African diaspora, West End.
- Zucot Gallery is the largest Black-owned art gallery in the Southeast U.S.
- Spelman College Museum of Fine Art on the Spelman College campus, specializing in art by and about women of the African diaspora
- The Art Museum at Clark Atlanta University emphasizes art by people of the African diaspora.
- Omenala Griot Afrocentric Teaching Museum is located in the West End.
- Old Zion Baptist Church Heritage Museum preserves the history, art and culture of the Black community in Cobb County.
- The Madame CJ Walker Museum, an original Madame CJ Walker Beauty Shoppe
- The National Center for Civil and Human Rights is in Pemberton Place, adjacent to Centennial Olympic Park.

== History ==
White people moved out of Atlanta in huge numbers from the years between 1960 and 1980 after Blacks started to move into the city. During the white flight, when whites started moving to Atlanta's suburbs, Blacks became the majority of Atlanta's population.

=== Antebellum ===
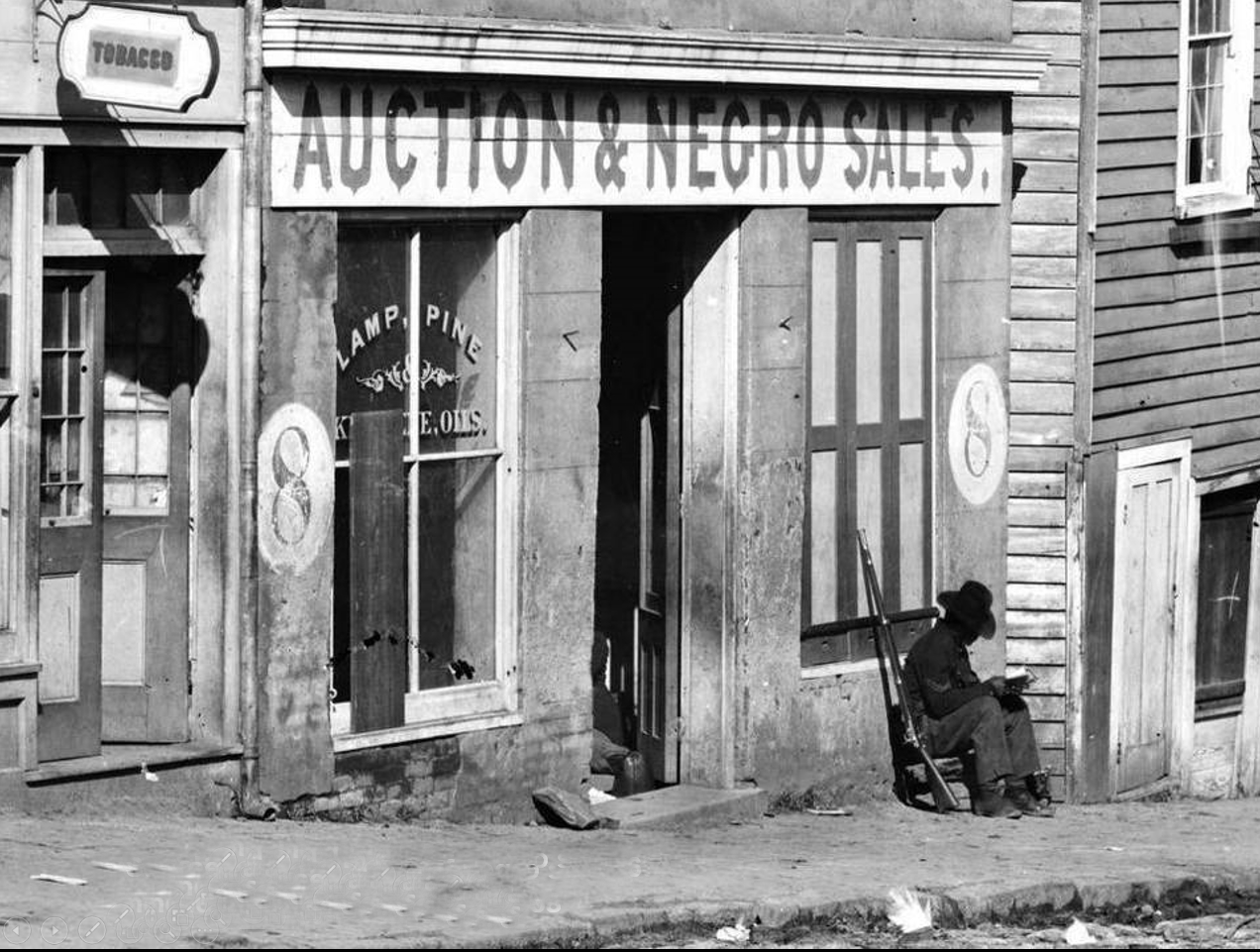
Crawford, Frazer & Co. "negro mart" at 8 Whitehall Street, photographed September 1864

Slavery in the state of Georgia was the main reason for early African American residency in the Atlanta area. The area that included Decatur was opened to settlement in 1823 following the forced abandonment of the area by the Cherokee Nation; with the ceding of the area under the Treaty of New Echota in 1835, plantations of rice and, later, cotton were installed in the area. Most slaves were brought from major ports such as Savannah and Charleston.

In 1850, the area which would become Atlanta, previously known as Terminus and Marthasville, had a population which included 493 African slaves, 18 free Blacks, and 2,058 whites. The general population of the area had only recently skyrocketed from a mere total of 30 residents in 1842 due to the building of two Georgia Railroad freight and passenger trains (1845) and the Macon & Western (1846, a third railroad) which connected the little settlement with Macon and Savannah. In the 1850s, Mary Combs and Ransom Montgomery became the first two African-Americans to own property in Atlanta.

In summer of the year 1851, around seven enslaved Black men were arrested for an attempted insurrection in Atlanta. Atlanta City Council had passed a wave of laws and restrictions on Black people in the city.

=== Civil War and Reconstruction ===
African slaves in the Atlanta area became divided in their loyalties to the then-current status quo as the American Civil War took place between the Confederacy, of which Georgia was a constituent member, and the Union states; the slavery regime also became harsher against both slave and free Africans, who were severely restricted in their movements by both local and state government in order to prevent desertion of the Africans to the Union side. However, many slaves from Atlanta took the chance to escape with Union soldiers under William Tecumseh Sherman in his March to the Sea following the razing of Atlanta to the ground; they followed his men to the Atlantic coast of Georgia, where they were granted land under Sherman's Special Field Orders, No. 15 (later rescinded under president Andrew Johnson).

In 1865, the Atlanta City Council vowed equal protection for whites and Blacks, and a school for Black children, the first in the city, opened in an old church building on Armstrong Street. The Methodist Episcopal Church's Freedman Aid Society founded a coeducational school for African American legislators that would later become Clark College (now Clark Atlanta University) in Atlanta. In 1870, following the ratification of the 15th Amendment by the state legislature, the first two African American members, William Finch and George Graham, were elected to the Board of Aldermen from the third and fourth wards, respectively, while Radical Republican Dennis Hammond sat as mayor.

According to the US Census and Slave Schedules, from 1860 to 1870 Fulton County more than doubled in population, from 14,427 to 33,336. The effects of African-American migration can be seen by the increase in Fulton County from 20.5% enslaved African Americans in 1860 to 45.7% colored (African-American) residents in 1870. In a pattern seen across the South after the Civil War, freedmen often moved from plantations to towns or cities for work. They also gathered in their own communities where they could live more freely from white control. Even if they continued to work as farm laborers, freedmen often migrated after the war. Fulton was one of several counties in Georgia where African American population increased significantly in those years.

=== Post-Reconstruction and Jim Crow ===
In the aftermath of Reconstruction, which mostly ended in 1877, African Americans in Atlanta were left to the mercies of the predominantly white state legislature and city council, and were politically disenfranchised during the Jim Crow era; whites had used a variety of tactics, including militias and legislation, to re-establish political and social supremacy throughout the South. By the turn of the century, Georgia passed legislation that completed the disenfranchisement of African Americans. Not even college-educated men could vote. However, while most Black Atlantans were poor and disenfranchised by Jim Crow, the gradual nationwide rise of the Black urban middle class became apparent in Atlanta, with the establishment of African American businesses, media and educational institutions.

Booker T. Washington, principal of the Tuskegee Institute in Alabama, delivered a speech to the 1895 Cotton States and International Exposition which urged African Americans to focus more upon economic empowerment instead of immediate socio-political empowerment and rights, much to the anger of other civil rights leaders, including W. E. B. Du Bois, a graduate of Fisk University and Harvard, who would become one of the major civil rights activists of the first half of the 20th century.

Competition for jobs and housing gave rise to fears and tensions. These catalyzed in 1906 in the Atlanta Race Riot. This left at least 28 dead, 25 of them African American, and over seventy people injured. Neighborhoods became more segregated as Blacks sought safety in majority-Black areas such as Sweet Auburn and areas west of Downtown. As racial tensions rose, particularly resentment from working-class whites against better-off Blacks, segregation was introduced into more areas of public life. For example, Atlanta's streetcars were officially segregated in 1910, with Blacks forced to sit at the rear.

In 1928, the Atlanta Daily World began publication, and continues as one of the oldest African American newspaper in circulation. From the 1920s to the 1940s, the Atlanta Black Crackers, a baseball team in the Negro Southern League, and later on, in the Negro American League, entertained sports fans at Ponce de Leon Park; some of the members of the Black Crackers would become players in Major League Baseball following the integration of the Negro leagues into the larger leagues. Sweet Auburn would become one of the premier predominantly African American urban settlements to the current day.

=== Civil rights movement ===
Since the rise of the civil rights movement, African Americans have wielded an increasingly potent degree of political power, most resultant in the currently unbroken string of African American mayors of the City of Atlanta since the election of Maynard Jackson in 1973; the current mayor of Atlanta is one-term Mayor Andre Dickens. In addition, Atlanta's city council has long been majority Black. All elected mayors of Atlanta are and have been members of the Democratic Party.

In 2008, Atlanta area resident Vernon Jones ran unsuccessfully to become the first African American to win the Democratic primary for representation of the state in the United States Senate.

In January 2021, Atlanta area resident and Morehouse College alumnus Raphael Warnock became the first Black U.S. senator elected in Georgia and the first Black U.S. Democratic senator elected in the South.

In May 2018, Atlanta area resident and Spelman College alumna Stacey Abrams became the first Black woman to win a major party nomination for governor in the United States. In November, she lost the controversial 2018 Georgia gubernatorial election by less than three percentage points. Due to the election being so close, Abrams committed to running for office again. In February 2019, Stacey Abrams became the first Black woman to give an official State of the Union address. In 2021, she announced she was running again for governor as promised, but lost to incumbent Republican Brian Kemp by a much wider margin in the 2022 Georgia gubernatorial election. In 2026, Atlanta native, and former mayor, Keisha Lance Bottoms became the first Black woman to be elected as governor in the United States after defeating billionaire Rick Jackson in the 2026 Georgia governor’s race.

== Gentrification ==
Since 2010, gentrification has changed and improved many aspects of Atlanta. Gentrification of predominately African-American inner-city neighborhoods, particularly those in close proximity to Downtown Atlanta or the BeltLine, is one of the major reasons why housing costs within the city limits significantly jumped which prompted many lower-income African Americans to move outside the city seeking a more affordable cost of living. Also, many higher-income African American families left for better public schools outside the city. In 2019, Atlanta was named the fourth fastest gentrifying city in the United States. In 2022, Atlanta was second in the nation for the highest inflation increase. In 2023, Atlanta's steady population growth worsened the housing shortage which further increased housing cost within the city. Since 1990, the African American resident percentage in Atlanta has dropped significantly, while the non-African American resident percentage increased significantly. The strongest growth of African Americans are now in the suburbs of Atlanta. The mayoral office of Atlanta is actively working on adding and maintaining affordable housing for low-income people in the city.

== Notable people ==
- Stacey Abrams
- Andre 3000
- Chloe Bailey
- Halle Bailey
- Big Boi
- Keisha Lance Bottoms
- Xernona Clayton Brady
- Toni Braxton
- Kandi Burruss
- Ciara
- Davido
- John Wesley Dobbs
- Jermaine Dupri
- Jasmine Guy
- Martin Luther King Jr.
- Coretta Scott King
- Gladys Knight
- Maynard Jackson
- Jazzy Pha
- Nene Leakes
- Lil Jon
- Lil Nas X
- Ludacris
- Kyle Massey
- Benjamin Mays
- Migos
- Tyler Perry
- Raven-Symoné
- Rupaul
- T.I.
- Chris Tucker
- Usher
- Summer Walker
- Fani Willis
- Andrew Young
- Young Thug

== See also ==
- Atlanta Exposition Speech
- Atlanta Student Movement
- Atlanta Voice
- 100 Black Men of America
- Tyler Perry Studios
- Cascade Heights
- Collier Heights
- List of African-American newspapers in Georgia
- National Coalition of 100 Black Women
- Freaknik
- Music in Atlanta
- Demographics of Atlanta
- Hispanic and Latino communities in Metro Atlanta
- History of the Jews in Atlanta
- 1906 Atlanta race riot
- George Floyd protests in Atlanta
- National Black Arts Festival
- Atlanta murders of 1979–1981
- Racial segregation in Atlanta
- History of Atlanta
