= The Atlanta Way =

The Atlanta Way may refer to:

- "The Atlanta Way", the historic cooperation between the white and black elites of Atlanta, Georgia: see History of Atlanta and History of African Americans in Atlanta
- The Atlanta Way (film), a 2011 documentary about the razing of public housing projects in Atlanta, Georgia, and the destiny of the residents
