= Atlanta's 3rd City Council district =

Atlanta's 3rd City Council district is one of the twelve geographic districts in the Atlanta City Council. It is currently represented by Byron Amos, who was elected in 2022 after defeating incumbent Antonio Brown.

The district was created in 1973 after a new city charter was passed, which replaced the former at-large six-member Board of Aldermen with a 15-member City Council of 12 districts and 6 (later 3) at-large posts. A previous Third Ward existed in various forms from 1854 to 1954.

== History ==
Atlanta's Third Ward was defined in 1880 as the area bounded on the North by Georgia Railroad, West by Butler & McDonough Streets, South and East by the city limits (the green section of picture)

Generally in Atlanta's Ward System, it encompassed the following modern neighborhoods: Grant Park, Ormewood Park and Cabbagetown.

== List of aldermen by boundary (1854-1954) ==
=== 1854 ===
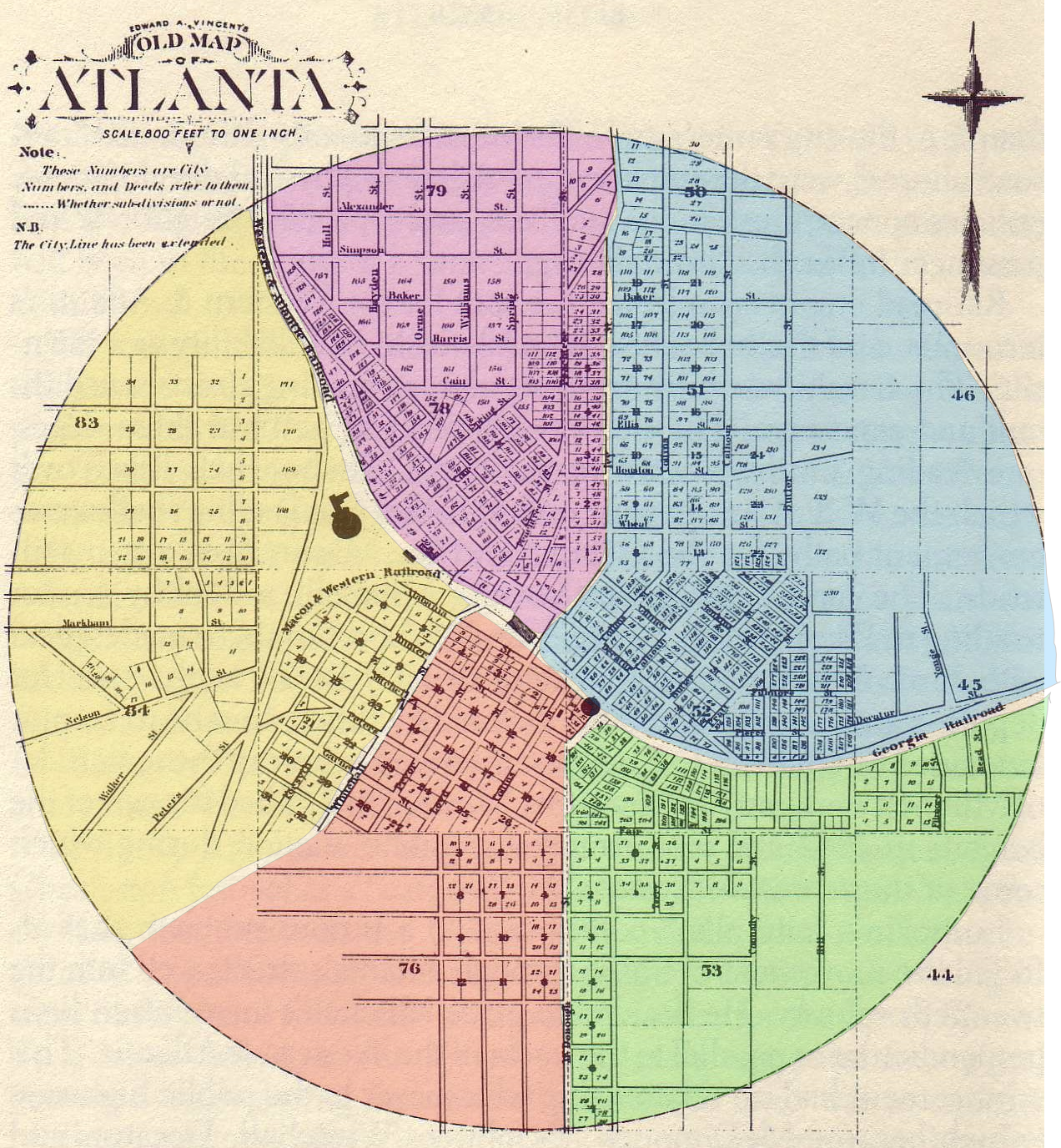
Third Ward (Green) 1854–1871

The original boundaries for five wards were laid out in an unknown fashion and two councilmen from each ward were elected to coincide with the completion of the first official city hall in 1854.

Third Ward councilmen of this period were

- 1855 John Farrar and J. W. Thompson
- 1856 Thomas L. Thomas and James L. Terry
- 1857 John B. Peck and John Glen
- 1858 James E. Williams and J.M. Blackwell
- 1859 Coleman F. Wood and J.M. Blackwell
- 1860 James R.D. Ozburn and Merrill T. Castelberry
- 1861 Seymour B. Love and Robert Crawford
- 1862 John Farrar and James G. Kelly
- 1863 F.D. Thurman and James G. Kelly
- 1864 William Watkins and Robert Crawford
- 1865 Thomas R. Ripley and F.M. Richardson
- 1866 Robert Crawford and James G. Kelly
- 1867 W.C. Anderson and George W. Terry
- 1868 (no election)
- 1869 Vardy P Sisson and William C. Anderson
- 1870 James G. Kelly and W.C. Anderson

=== 1871 ===
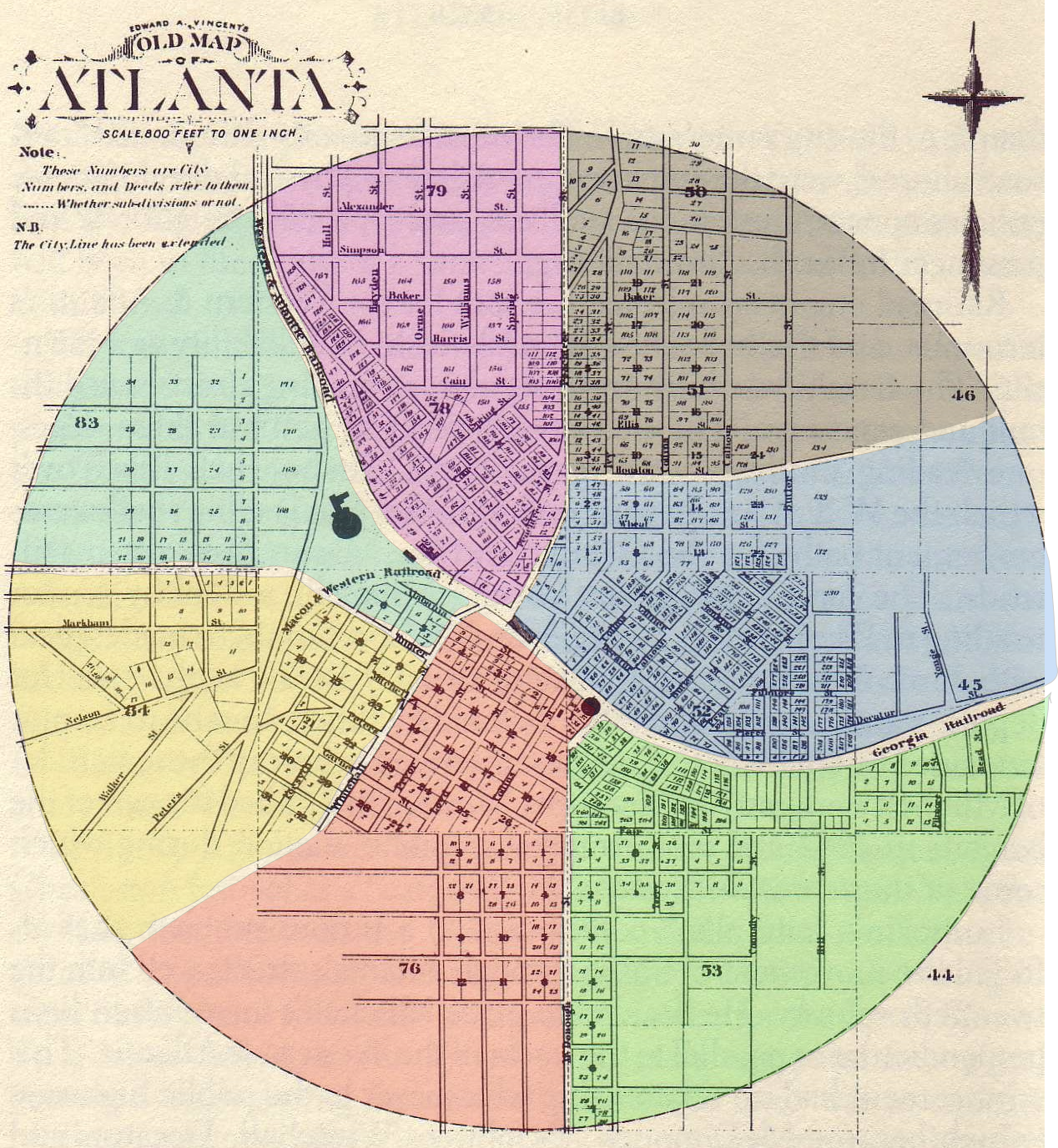
Third Ward (green) 1871–1874

- 1871 George Graham
- 1872 Lemuel P. Grant and Thomas A. Morris
- 1873 Robert C. Young and David A. Beatie
- 1874 James G. Kelly and Robert C. Young
- 1875 Thomas A. Morris and David A. Beatie

=== 1876 ===
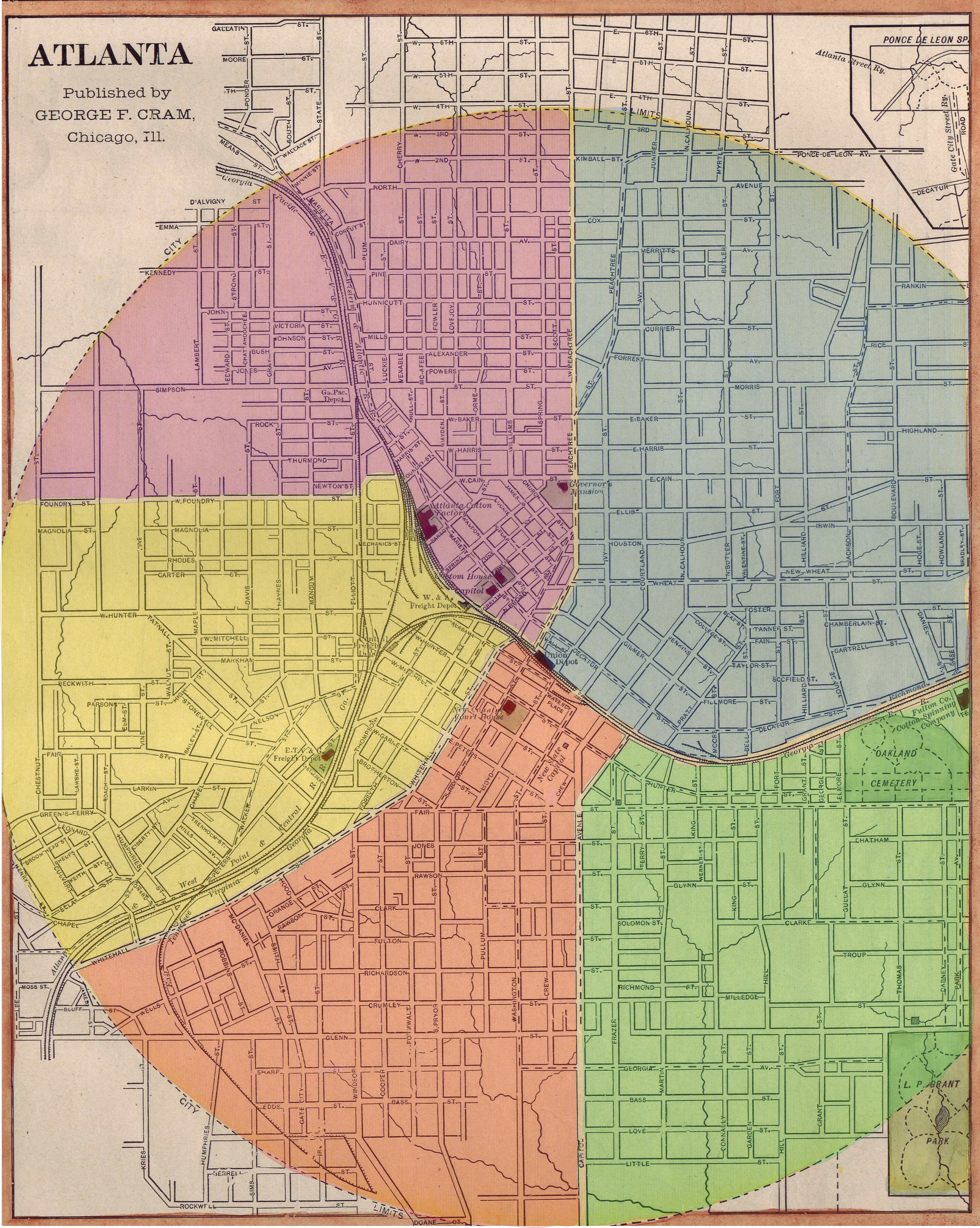
Third Ward (green) 1874 to 1883

The new city charter reduced the number of wards to 5 and created a Board of Aldermen

- 1876 William Gray
- 1877 J.M. Buice
- 1878 William E. Hayne
- 1879 James K. Thrower
- 1880 Thomas J. Buchanan
- 1881 David A. Beatie
- 1882 Zachry W. Adamson
- 1883 Samuel W. Day

=== 1884 ===
Sixth Ward (north Peachtree corridor) added

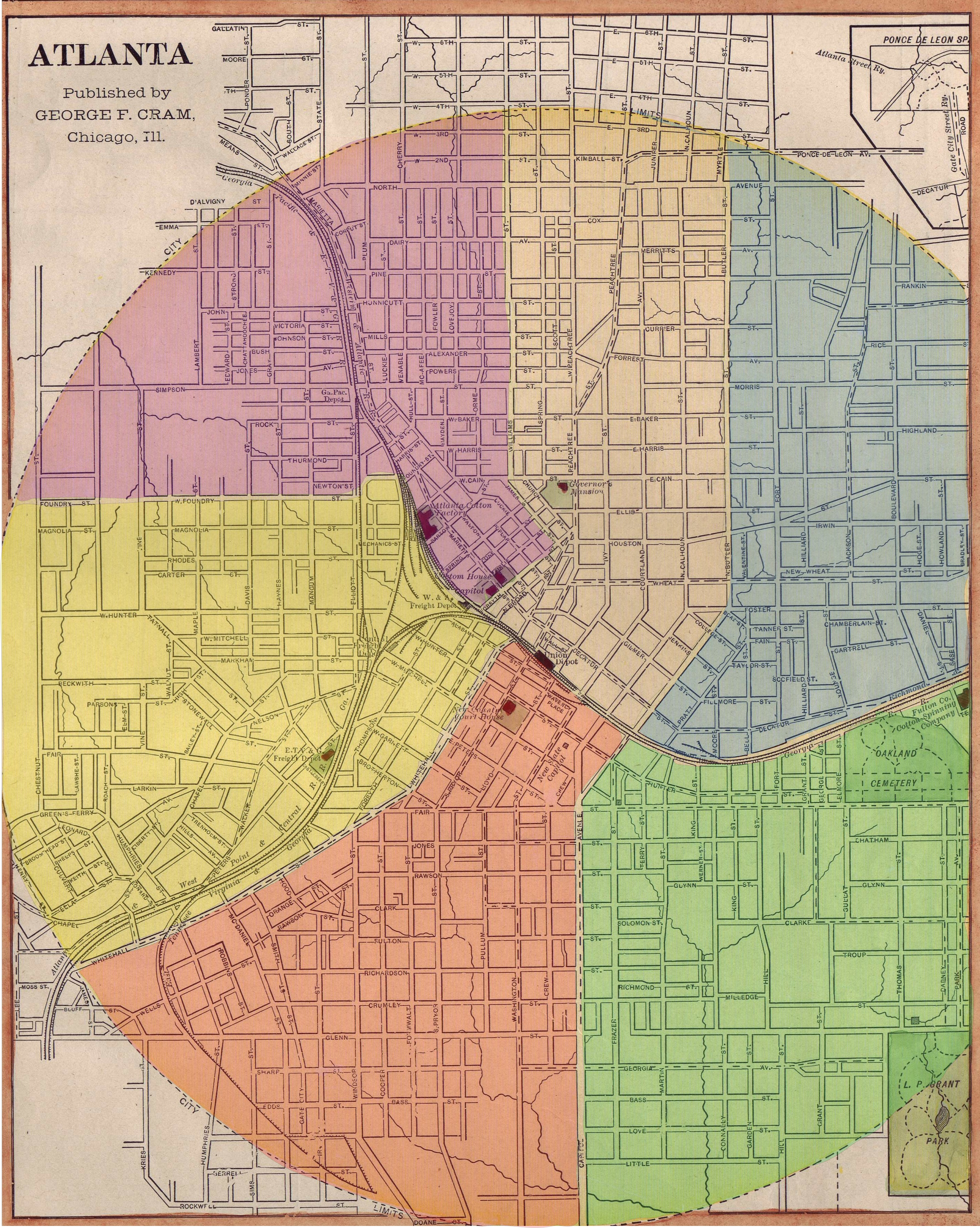
Atlanta's Third Ward (green) 1883 to 1894

- 1884 C. Wheeler Mangum
- 1885 David A. Beatie
- 1886 Edgar A. Angier
- 1887 Elisha T. Allen
- 1888 James G. Woodward
- 1889 James G. Woodward and A.S. Robbins
- 1890 A.S. Robbins and W.H. Hulsey
- 1891 W.H. Hulsey and Arnold Broyles
- 1892 John F. McWaters
- 1893 David A. Beatie

=== 1894 ===
Seventh Ward (West End) added

- 1894 Robert P. Dodge
- 1895 Walter S. Bell
- 1896 William E. Adamson
- 1897 Eldred S. Lumpkin
- 1898 Edward P. Burns
- 1899 J. Sidney Holland, manager Kimball House Saloon
- 1900 Axton C. Minhinnett, grocer
- 1901 John C. Reed, lawyer
- 1902 James E. Warren, lawyer
- 1903 J. Sid Holland, tobacconist
- 1904 Thomas H. Goodwin, lawyer

=== 1905 ===
Eighth Ward (West End) added

- 1905 William Oldknow, poolroom proprietor

=== 1935 ===
==== Aldermen ====
- L. O. Moseley

==== Councilmembers ====
- Archie L. Lindsey
- J. Allen Couch

=== 1954 ===
- W. T. "Bill" Knight"
- Jimmy Vickers (Position 2, -1966)
- Q. V. Williamson (Position 2, 1966-1974)

== List of councilmembers (1974–present) ==
- James Howard (1974–1987)
- Jabari Simama (1987 – January 3, 1994)
- Michael Julian Bond (January 3, 1994 – 2002)
- Ivory Lee Young (2002–2018)
- Antonio Brown (2019–2022)
- Byron Amos (2022–present)
