= William Finch (politician) =

Georgia reconstruction era Minister and American politician

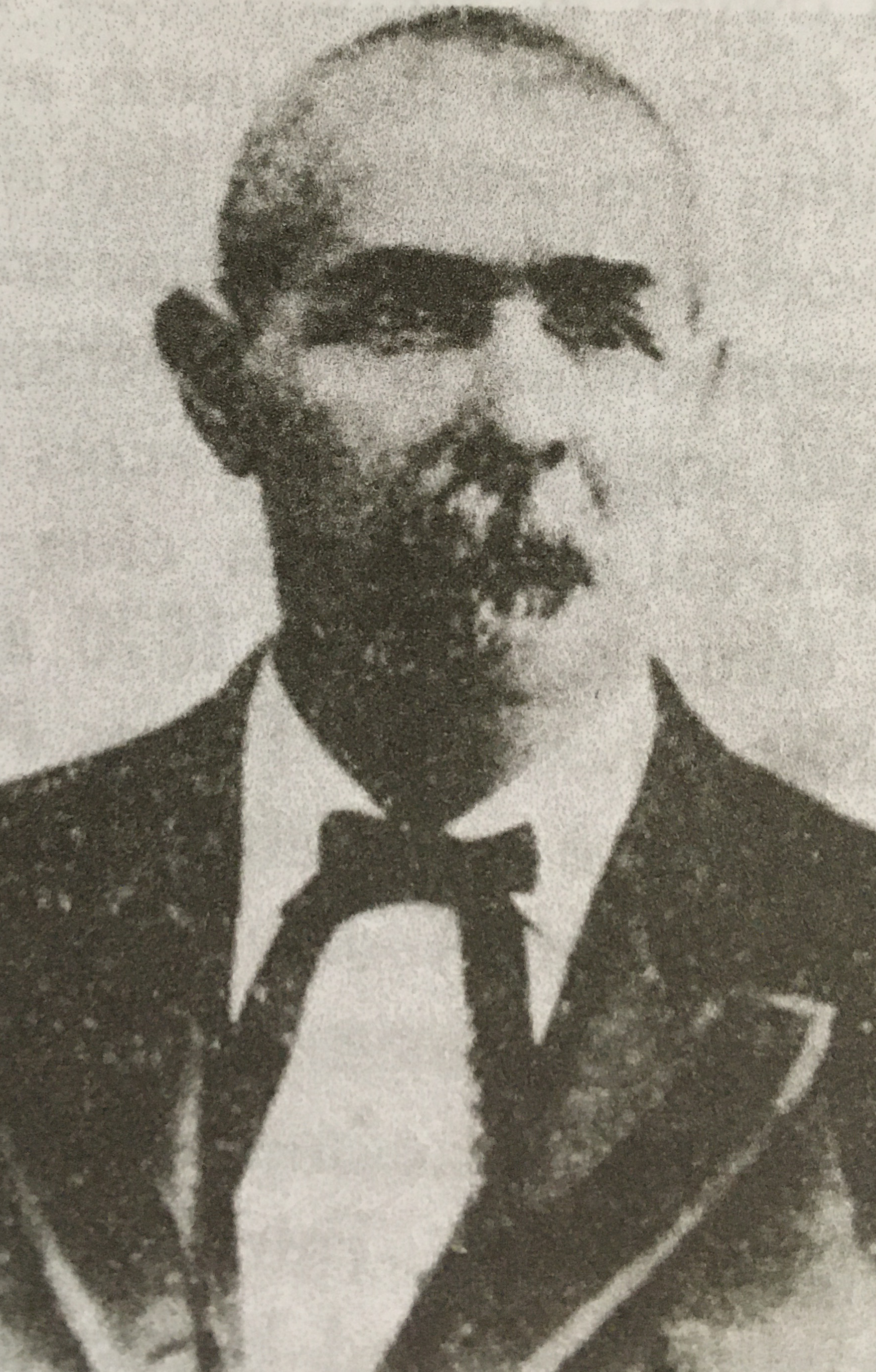

Member of the Atlanta Board of Aldermen Fourth Ward
- In office December 7, 1870 – January 5, 1872

Personal details
- Born: October 1, 1832 Washington, Wilkes County, Georgia
- Died: January 10, 1911 (aged 78)
- Occupation: Politician, minister, tailor

William S. Finch (October 1, 1832 - January 10, 1911) was a minister, tailor, and politician.

== Biography ==
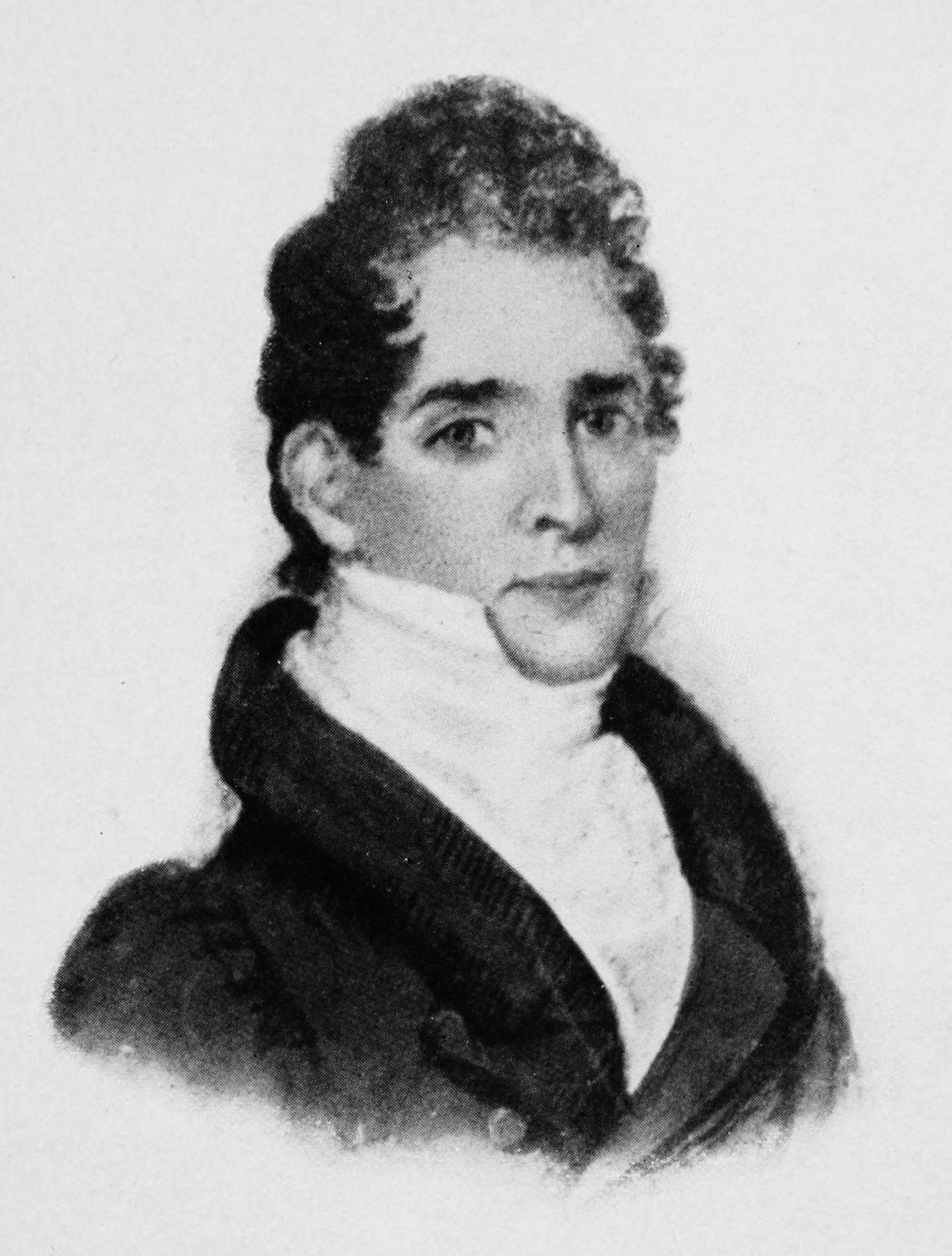
Judge Garnett Andrews - Finch's owner from 1844 to 1865

Finch was born October 1, 1832, enslaved in Washington, Wilkes County, Georgia. When he was twelve he was taken into the home of Judge Garnett Andrews, the father of Eliza Frances Andrews where he was educated to read and write. Whilst at the Andrews house, where he stayed for four years, he also became a tailor's apprentice.

He was purchased by Joseph H. Lumpkin the chief justice of the Georgia Supreme Court in 1848, and while still enslaved worked as a tailor and acquired some property. Finch attributed his time with Justice Lumpkin and the counsel he received to his later success in life.

He married Laura Wright in 1854 and when the American Civil War started he and his family moved back to the Judge Andrew's home where they remained until the end in 1865 by that point they already had six children together. He was often called to help the wounded Confederate soldiers and to protect his owner's property and family. At the end of the war he showed his appreciation for his freedom by presenting to the 144th New York regiment an American flag he had made.

In 1866 he moved with his family to Augusta, Georgia, and in February of that year attended the 1866 black convention. While in Augusta he help set up a school for blacks and opened his own tailor shop but after realising the income was not enough to keep his family they moved again, in 1868, to Atlanta, Georgia, and opened a successful tailor shop on Peachtree Street.

Over the next four years he acquired $1000 worth of real-estate and by the 1890s was believed to be worth around $6000 including his own horse and buggy and an expensive home.

Finch was described as mulatto, around five foot six in height and with a large drooping moustache and heavy eyebrows.

He had been an active church member while still a slave and in 1868 he became an ordained minister for the African Methodist Episcopal Church and later in 1876 reached the position of elder. He was charged, probably due to personal conflicts with another minister, with leading a "vicious life" and removed from the church during the 1880s.

== Politics ==
Finch and George Graham were the first African Americans that were elected to serve on the Atlanta City Council in 1870. He failed to get re-elected in 1871, 1872, and 1879 meaning that they were the last black people to be elected to any office in the city until 1953, over eighty three years later.

While serving on the council he fought for the employment of black teachers, for establishing public schools for blacks as well as other legislation to benefit all citizens. He successfully lobbied for street improvements in both black and poor white neighborhoods.

In 1884 he made an unsuccessful run for the Georgia legislature in 1884, the final end to his political career.

== Death ==
Finch died on January 10, 1911, and is buried in the Oakland Cemetery. He died leaving an estate worth between $12,000 and $15,000 mostly from property with most of that being a plot of land on Edgewood avenue which he had purchased for less than $300.

== See also ==
- African American officeholders from the end of the Civil War until before 1900
