= Omenala Griot Afrocentric Teaching Museum =

Teaching museum in Atlanta, Georgia

Coordinates: 33.7459°N 84.4246°W

Omenala Griot Afrocentric Teaching Museum is an Afrocentric teaching museum in the West End neighborhood of Atlanta.

== Description ==
The museum offers visitors a "hands-on" African American experience by seeing, hearing, saying, touching and doing. The museum's stated goals is to "rectify, reclaim and restore the contributions of Black people throughout history, which have been denied, ignored and omitted." Murals line the garden walls of the museum, picturing Afrocentric subjects.

== History ==
It was founded in 1992.
