= George Graham (Georgia politician) =

American politician

Member of the Atlanta Board of Aldermen Third Ward
- In office December 7, 1870 – January 5, 1872

Personal details
- Occupation: Politician

George Graham was an American politician. Graham and William Finch were the two first black people to serve on the Atlanta Board of Aldermen during Reconstruction.

Graham was in office from December 7, 1870 until January 5, 1872, representing the Third Ward of Atlanta.
