= Hispanic and Latino communities in Metro Atlanta =

Racial communities in Metro Atlanta

Atlanta, the largest urban center in the southeastern U.S., has undergone profound social, cultural and demographic change since the 1980s. Prior to that time, the region contained two main ethnic groups: European Americans and African Americans. However, from 1980 to 1995, the Hispanic population of Georgia grew 130%. By 1996 there were 462,973 Hispanics in Georgia. From 1990 to 2000, Georgia became the third largest state for migrating Hispanics and Latinos.

== Immigration ==
The main increase in Latino immigration to Atlanta began in the 1990s, as a result of the construction boom that accompanied the 1996 Olympics. However, the increase in the Hispanic population began before Atlanta was named host of the games in 1990. The Hispanic population is the largest non-traditional minority group in Metro Atlanta. Hispanics grew from 30,000 in 1982, to over 110,000 in 1992—260% in ten years. Between 1992 and 1996, the Hispanic population of the Atlanta metro area grew to over 231,619—an increase of 110% in just six years. Of these, 9,571, or 4%, are children in school. This growth has changed the cultural make-up of the city: three Mexican-owned radio stations that broadcast in Spanish, and, in 1997, there were three Spanish language newspapers, increasing to eleven by 1999. Mexican workers play an important role in the service sector, as well as in construction and industry. Meat packers, especially chicken processing plants, must be located close to the farm to reduce losses of live animals in transportation. Packers, then, are tied to the production region, but they use up the local work force because of the arduous and dangerous working conditions, as well as low salaries. As in the rest of the country, the Hispanic population in Atlanta continues to grow but at a smaller rate, according to the Pew Hispanic Center. Furthermore, DeKalb County, in suburban Atlanta, showed between 2010 and 2014 the biggest decline in Hispanic population in 11 counties that have Hispanic populations of 10,000 or more. Numbers revealed by the US Census in 2015 showed that in DeKalb County Hispanic population was 64,279 in 2014, down 4% from 2010.

== Statistics ==
=== Metro Atlanta ===
At 10.7% of the metro's population in 2010, versus only 6.5% in 2000, the metro's Hispanic population increased 103.6%, or 278,459 people, in ten years. Major Hispanic groups include 314,351 Mexicans, 43,337 Puerto Ricans, and 24,439 Salvadorans. All of those groups' populations increased by over 90% in the ten-year period. Of the metro's 279,000-person increase in the Hispanic population from 2000 to 2010, 98,000 came in Gwinnett County, 37,000 in Cobb County, 25,000 in Fulton County (all but 3,000 outside the city of Atlanta), 20,000 in Hall County, and 15,000 in DeKalb County. The Hispanic population is heavily concentrated in the northeastern and eastern sections of the Atlanta metropolitan Area. The Atlanta Regional Commission states that in 2016 the Hispanic/Latino population for Gwinnett County was 189,050. For Cobb County the population was 96,263. For Fulton County the population was 74,853. Hall County's population was 55,074. Finally, for DeKalb County the population was 63,287. They got their information from the United States Bureau.

=== City of Atlanta ===
The 2010 and 2000 Hispanic population of the city was:

Ethnicity	Pop. 2010	% of total 2010	Pop. 2000	% of total 2000	absolute change 2000–2010	% change 2000-2010
Hispanic or Latino of any race	21,815	5.2%	18,720	4.5%	3,095	16.5%

The city of Atlanta's Hispanic population increased by 16.5% from 2000 to 2010, and in 2010 the city was 5.2% Hispanic. Hispanic Americans are the fastest growing ethnic group.

=== 2003 statistics from Atlanta Archdiocese ===
A needs assessment for the Archdiocese of Atlanta in 2003 summarized the main characteristics of the Hispanic population at that time. The estimated total population of Hispanics in north Georgia was 460,000. They came from 20 countries: Mexico is the birth country for over 75% of the sample, Colombia for 7% and Guatemala for 4%. At least 50% of the population was undocumented at the time. The average age of the population was 33 years old. The average year of arrival to the U.S. was 1992, and the average year of arrival to Georgia was 1995.

==== Living situations ====
Many Hispanic people still had ties to their birth country, as 40% still owned a home there. About half of those surveyed sent money home, especially those with children in their home country. However, the longer they resided in America, the less money they sent home. In America, 49% lived in a house, 36% lived in apartments, and 12.5% lived in trailers. The average rent was $665 per month. The most common living situations had three family members sleeping in two bedrooms, while renting out the third bedroom or living room to two people. On average, Hispanic people surveyed had spent over two years in their housing at the time. Men moved more than women.

==== Families ====
86% of the sample were married, with women being more likely to marry. 15% of the population had no children, but over 80% had no children in their home country.

==== Work ====
Unemployment at the time was less than 4%. 11% of women worked in meat packing, 8% in domestic services, and 7% in professional industries. 29% of men worked in construction, (including 8% who were skilled construction workers or crew chiefs,) 10% in meat packing, and 7% in carpet businesses. In their home countries, 31% of the population worked in agriculture, 13% in construction, and 11% in professional industries.

==== Language ====
61% of the population did not speak English, while 35% were bilingual. 3.9% spoke an indigenous language. The main language spoken at home was Spanish, though 10% either only spoke English or English and Spanish at home.

==== Religion ====
Most of the population went to mass every week. At the time, the ratio of men to women in mass was 55 to 46. Women went to mass more often, and it was reported that most people came to mass with two to three other members of their household. 80% went to mass in car, compared to 9% by paid ride, and 43% of the population prefers mass at noon, alongside the 80% who prefer mass on Sunday. Only a small percentage, 6.5%, practiced a religion other than Christianity, though 10% reported living with someone who practiced a non-Christian religion. 10% of the population needed baptism services, while over 25% had already used the service. Another 25% of the population expressed the need for Bible study. Half the population preferred to send their children to a parochial school. Finally, 73% of the population had never served in a parish ministry.

==== Needs ====
The same study reports that main needs of the Hispanic population include:

- More report social needs (35%) than religious needs (29%)
- Most people know what services are offered in their parishes
- The greatest needs are for English classes (35%), legal advice (33%), helping getting driver's licenses (28%), and medical care (17%)
- Few need financial help or employment assistance
- Services actually used include English language classes (20%), youth group, financial support, and newcomers groups

== Culture ==
Atlanta's vibrant and growing Hispanic community is represented at Festival Peachtree Latino, held annually Piedmont Park in Midtown Atlanta. The festival, which celebrates Hispanic-American culture, is the largest multicultural event in the entire Southeast. The festival features arts and crafts, family activities, sporting events, a parade, dance demonstrations, ethnic foods, and a live music stage featuring international performers from Mexico, Puerto Rico, Colombia, Venezuela, and the Dominican Republic. In addition, over 250 exhibitors present favorite brands, souvenirs and interactive displays. The festival, which began in 2000, continues to grow in attendance. It is free and open to the public.

=== Plaza Fiesta ===
Plaza Fiesta is located in metro Atlanta's most diverse communities, in the intersection of Clairmont Road and Buford Highway, where the cities of Chamblee and Brookhaven meet. It has retail and specialty stores, restaurants, healthcare services and a fitness center. Plaza Fiesta has become an important shopping destination for the Atlanta immigrant population. Vincent Riggio and Doug McMurrian took over the shopping center in 1999, and after talking to consultants, business owners and residents along Buford Highway, they decided there was a need for a communal center. McMurrain traveled to Mexico to walk through the open-air flea markets and decided he would renovate the interior of the mall based on the Mexican flea market model. The center, which is 350,000 square-feet retail center draws 4.4 million visitors a year from all over the Southeast.

== Health ==
With a growth rate of over 300% since 1999, doctors and hospitals struggle to provide services to Spanish speaking patients. With multiple versions of the Spanish language, which may be understood by other Latinos or Hispanics in the same region, cultural differences, the lack of interpreters for Spanish, and monolingual English speaking medical staff, obtaining adequate healthcare is a problem for Hispanics and Latinos in Georgia. In addition to the language barrier, there is another problem that exists for Latinos and Hispanics in the healthcare industry. According to the Georgia Minority Health & Health Disparities Report, 41% of Georgians without health insurance are Hispanics, with an additional 24% representing multi-cultural communities. Although the Hispanic and Latino communities make up 29% of the working class in Georgia, the majority of Hispanics and Latinos do not benefit from having either public or private health insurance.

=== Diabetes ===
With an increase in population over the last decade, there has also been a steady increase in the number of diabetes cases in the Atlanta. Although African Americans have the highest cases of diabetes with 31%, the morbidity rate of Hispanics and Latinos has doubled over the past ten years to 1.8%. This information warrants improved medical attention that should focus on the Latino and Hispanic communities. Additionally, diabetes among pregnant women in Georgia compared to the U.S. has constantly increased to approximately 1.50% from 1995 to 2005. Although diabetes is more common in Blacks than any other racial or ethnic group, Latino individuals are more than 1.5 times more likely to have diabetes than non-Hispanic Whites, and those of Mexican origin are twice as likely to have diabetes as other Latinos.

== Misrepresentation in News Media ==
Latinos bring many economic and cultural benefits to the Atlanta area. For example, a report by Hamilton et al., funded by the Bank of America Charitable Foundation, found that between 2018 and 2021, Latinos in Atlanta Metro area were responsible for 18.8 percent of the area’s GDP growth even though they were only 11.2 percent of the area’s population. This means that Latino’s contribution to economic grown was 67.9 percent larger than their population share. This suggests that Latinos in the Atlanta metro area are playing a disproportionately significant role in driving economic growth. Their contributions to the labor market, entrepreneurship, and consumer spending are outpacing their demographic representation, highlighting their economic resilience and productivity.

Despite these statistics, researchers Martínez and López note that Latinos are frequently misrepresented in media in Atlanta. Through focusing on the discourse surrounding racial and ethnic demographic changes, they find that among news articles covering data and statistics about Latino, Asian, White, and Black ethnic groups in Gwinnett County, Latinos appeared in 71.4% of articles—a significantly higher rate than other groups, who were mentioned in 20% to 50% of articles. This discrepancy may reflect subjective factors in media representation, such as the underrepresentation of white residents or a heightened portrayal of Latinos as a perceived “threat.”

This reinforces a national narrative about Latinos and immigrants. Analyzing three national news magazines, the Newsweek, Time and U.S. News & World Report, between 2000 and 2010, Emily M. Farris and Heather Silber Mohamed observe that more than 54% of the images studied that depicted immigrants portrayed them as unauthorized to be in the U.S. But less than 25% of the nation’s foreign-born population is unauthorized.

Furthermore, nearly three-quarters (73.1%) of the images depicting immigrants working portray them in low-skilled occupations, such as day laborers, while just over a quarter (26.9%) show them in high-skilled professions, like computer programming.

These numbers reflect a need to critically interpret news and media surrounding Latinos, Hispanics, and immigrants both in Atlanta and nationally.

== Demographics ==
The number of Latinos has grown exponentially since the 1900s. The growth of Latino migrants has been dramatic: the number of Hispanics grew more than seven times between 1982 and 1996, to over 232,000, resulting in 234,010 Hispanic migrants by 1998.

As of the 2010 census, there were 819,887 Hispanics living in Georgia (up from 462,000 in 1996), making it the 10th largest state for Hispanics in the United States. Of those 819,000, approximately 50% lived in four counties: Cobb, DeKalb, Fulton, and Gwinnett. Of those four counties, Gwinnett experienced the fastest growth rate of 126% from 2000 through 2009. Of the 819,000 Hispanics in Georgia, approximately 43% own his or her own home, but 49% do not have health insurance. Many of these Hispanics are young. In fact, the population of Hispanic Millennials in Atlanta is forecast to increase by 24% between 2013 and 2018.

=== Female immigrants ===
About 10% of female migrants are single. Women typically start working informally in childcare, and then move into domestic service or hotel work. Few women migrate alone, with most women following their husband once he has settled. Over 70% of Mexican women migrate to join their spouse; 20% come with their parents and only 7% come alone. Younger couples reunite sooner than older couples. The average gap between husband's and wife's migration is three years. Women have an average of 2.5 children, although 10% have no children.

Men earn enough in the U.S. to live and send money home, but not enough to support a typical family of 5. In 2000, a man could earn $1100 per month, or up to $1300 with two jobs, and his living expenses were at least $500. He could live and work in the U.S. and send money home, where his wife and children worked and lived cheaply. In Atlanta, expenses for a family of 5 were at least $1400 per month, more than one man's salary, but within the reach of a two-worker family.

=== Hispanic or Latino by national origin ===
Ancestry by origin	Number	%
(Mexico) Mexican	11,827	
(Puerto Rico) Puerto Rican	2,258	
(Cuba) Cuban	1,333	
(Dominican Republic) Dominican	473	
(Costa Rica) Costa Rican	126	
(Guatemala) Guatemalan	466	
(Honduras) Honduran	518	
(Nicaragua) Nicaraguan	113	
(Panama) Panamanian	376	
(El Salvador) Salvadoran	217	
(Argentina) Argentine	256	
(Bolivia) Bolivian	43	
(Chile) Chilean	134	
(Colombia) Colombian	989	
(Ecuador) Ecuadorian	137	
(Paraguay) Paraguayan	32	
(Peru) Peruvian	315	
(Uruguay) Uruguayan	58	
(Venezuela) Venezuelan	350	

== See also ==
- Festival Peachtree Latino
- Hispanic and Latino Americans
- White Hispanic and Latino Americans
- Plaza Fiesta
