= Ransom Montgomery =

American slave

- Born: c. 1806; Georgia
- Died: December 6, 1884 (aged 77–78); Atlanta, Georgia
- Resting place: Oakland Cemetery, Atlanta, Georgia
- Relatives: Andrew (brother)

Ransom Montgomery (c. 1806 – December 6, 1884) was an American slave, the only slave owned by the state of Georgia, and the second black person to own property in Atlanta.

== Early life ==
Montgomery moved to Atlanta when he was 12 years old.

== Heroic action and consequence ==
The slave, Ransom Montgomery, first rose to public attention in July 1849 when he was manning a ferry boat near a wooden bridge that spanned the Chattahoochee River. Montgomery noticed that the bridge was on fire and a train traveling over the bridge was in danger of catching fire. He was able to quickly extinguish the fire. As a reward for his act, the government-owned Western and Atlantic Railroad purchased him from his master, H. B. Y. Montgomery, for $1250. Although then legally owned by Georgia, he was essentially treated as a freedman.

By an act of the State legislature, Montgomery was awarded $562.50 and a monthly stipend for life, as well as a plot of land (located next to the Macon roundhouse), where he was allowed to work as a food and beverage vendor. In September, 1884, he was made custodian of the original Atlanta City Hall at a rate of $15 monthly.

Montgomery's brother, Andrew Montgomery, was a prominent Methodist minister in Atlanta's black community. Lemuel Grant gifted the Montgomeries land on which to build a church. The church and his home were burned down in the 1864 Battle of Atlanta during Sherman's March to the Sea. Following the war, he rebuilt his house, and the Montgomery brothers purchased another plot of land on Sweet Auburn (now Auburn Avenue), and founded the Big Bethel AME Church, the oldest African-American church in Atlanta at the site. The Montgomery brothers became respected leaders in their community in the 19th century.

== Mishap and death ==
In 1881, Montgomery fell while climbing stairs in present-day Vine City. He successfully sued the city of Atlanta for neglecting to maintain the stairway, at which point he was turned out from his house by the city. Following this, he never fully recovered his health. Montgomery died in Thomasville Heights on December 6, 1884, and was buried in Atlanta's Oakland Cemetery. Henry Dickerson McDaniel, the governor of Georgia at the time, paid for Montgomery's burial costs.
