= 140th Georgia General Assembly =

←	139th	141st	→
- Great Seal of the State of Georgia

Overview
- Legislative body: Georgia General Assembly
- Meeting place: Georgia State Capitol

Senate
- Members: 56
- President of the Senate: Zell Miller (D)
- Party control: Democratic Party

House of Representatives
- Members: 180
- Speaker of the House: Tom Murphy (D)
- Party control: Democratic Party

The 140th Georgia General Assembly met from January 9, 1989, until January 14, 1991, at the Georgia State Capitol in Atlanta.

== Party standings ==
=== Senate ===
Affiliation	Members
Republican Party	11
Democratic Party	45
Other party^{*}	0
Total	56

=== House of Representatives ===
Affiliation	Members
Republican Party	36
Democratic Party	144
Other party^{*}	0
Total	180

^{*}Active political parties in Georgia are not limited to the Democratic and Republican parties. Libertarians, and occasionally others, run candidates in elections. However, for the 1989-90 session of the General Assembly, only the two major parties were successful in electing legislators to office.

== Officers ==
=== Senate ===
==== Presiding Officer ====
Position	Name	District	Party
President	Zell Miller	n/a	Democratic
President Pro Tempore	Joseph E. Kennedy	04	Democratic

==== Majority leadership ====
Position	Name	District
Senate Majority Leader	Thomas F. Allgood	22
Majority Caucus Chairman	W.F. (Billy) Harris	27
Majority Whip	Eugene P. (Gene) Walker	43

==== Minority leadership ====
Position	Name	District
Senate Minority Leader	R.T. (Tom) Phillips	09
Minority Caucus Chairman	James W. (Jim) Tysinger	41
Minority Whip	Sallie Newbill	56

=== House of Representatives ===
==== Presiding Officer ====
Position	Name	District	Party
Speaker of the House	Thomas B. Murphy	18	Democratic
Speaker Pro Tempore	Jack Connell	87	Democratic

==== Majority leadership ====
Position	Name	District
House Majority Leader	Larry Walker	115
Majority Whip	Denmark Groover	99
Majority Caucus Chairman	Bill Lee	72
Majority Caucus Secretary	Ward Edwards	112

==== Minority leadership ====
Position	Name	District
House Minority Leader	Johnny Isakson	21-2
Minority Whip	Herman Clark	20-3
Minority Caucus Chairman	Dorothy Felton	22
Minority Caucus Vice Chairman	Jerry Max Davis	45
Minority Caucus Secretary	Anne Mueller	126

== Members of the State Senate ==
District	Senator	Party	Residence
1	J. Tom Coleman	Democratic	Savannah
2	Albert (Al) Scott	Democratic	Savannah
3	R. Joseph Hammill	Democratic	Brunswick
4	Joseph E. Kennedy	Democratic	Claxton
5	Joe Burton	Republican	Atlanta
6	Earl Echols, Jr.	Democratic	Patterson
7	Ed Perry	Democratic	Nashville
8	Loyce W. Turner	Democratic	Valdosta
9	R.T. (Tom) Phillips	Republican	Lilburn
10	Harold J. Ragan	Democratic	Cairo
11	Jimmy Hodge Timmons	Democratic	Blakely
12	Mark Taylor	Democratic	Albany
13	Rooney L. Bowen	Democratic	Cordele
14	Lewis H. (Bud) McKenzie	Democratic	Montezuma
15	Gary Parker	Democratic	Columbus
16	Ted J. Land	Republican	Columbus
17	Mac Collins	Republican	Jackson
18	Ed Barker	Democratic	Warner Robins
19	Walter S. Ray	Democratic	Douglas
20	Hugh M. Gillis, Sr.	Democratic	Soperton
21	William F. English	Democratic	Swainsboro
22	Thomas F. Allgood	Democratic	Augusta
23	Frank Albert	Republican	Augusta
24	G.B. "Jake" Pollard, Jr.	Democratic	Appling
25	Culver Kidd	Democratic	Milledgeville
26	Tommy C. Olmstead	Democratic	Macon
27	W.F. (Billy) Harris	Democratic	Thomaston
28	Arthur B. "Skin" Edge, IV	Republican	Newnan
29	A. Quillian Baldwin, Jr.	Democratic	LaGrange
30	Wayne Garner	Democratic	Carrollton
31	Nathan Dean	Democratic	Rockmart
32	Hugh A. Ragan	Republican	Smyrna
33	Roy E. Barnes	Democratic	Mableton
34	Bev Engram	Democratic	Fairburn
35	Arthur Langford, Jr.	Democratic	Atlanta
36	David Scott	Democratic	Atlanta
37	Chuck Clay	Republican	Marietta
38	Horace E Tate	Democratic	Atlanta
39	Hildred W. Shumake	Democratic	Atlanta
40	Michael J. Egan	Republican	Atlanta
41	James W. (Jim) Tysinger	Republican	Atlanta
42	Pierre Howard	Democratic	Decatur
43	Eugene P. (Gene) Walker	Democratic	Decatur
44	Terrell Starr	Democratic	Forest Park
45	Harrill L. Dawkins	Democratic	Conyers
46	Paul C. Broun	Democratic	Athens
47	C. Donald Johnson, Jr.	Democratic	Royston
48	Donn M. Peevy	Democratic	Lawrenceville
49	J. Nathan Deal	Democratic	Gainesville
50	John C. Foster	Democratic	Cornelia
51	Max Brannon	Democratic	Calhoun
52	Kenneth C. Fuller	Democratic	Rome
53	Waymond C. Huggins	Democratic	LaFayette
54	W.W. (Bill) Fincher, Jr.	Democratic	Chatsworth
55	Lawrence Stumbaugh	Democratic	Stone Mountain
56	Sallie Newbill	Republican	Atlanta

== Members of the House of Representatives ==
District	Representative	Party	Residence
1-1	Mike Snow	Democratic	Chickamauga
1-2	Robert H. (Bob) McCoy	Democratic	Rossville
2	McCracken Poston	Democratic	Ringgold
3	Charles N. Poag	Democratic	Eton
4-1	Carlton H. Colwell	Democratic	Blairsville
4-2	Ralph Twiggs	Democratic	Hiawassee
5	John G. Crawford	Democratic	Lyerly
6-1	Jim Tyson Griffin	Democratic	Tunnel Hill
6-2	Philip A. (Phil) Foster	Democratic	Dalton
7	James Beverly Langford	Democratic	Calhoun
8-1	Steve Stancil	Republican	Canton
8-2	Bill Hasty	Democratic	Canton
9-1	E. Wycliffe ("Wyc") Orr	Democratic	Gainesville
9-2	Bobby Lawson	Democratic	Gainesville
9-3	Jerry D. Jackson	Democratic	Chestnut Mountain
10	Bill H. Barnett	Democratic	Cumming
11-1	William J. Dover	Democratic	Clarkesville
11-2	Mary Jeanette Jamieson	Democratic	Toccoa
12	Lauren (Bubba) McDonald	Democratic	Commerce
13-1	Louie Max Clark	Democratic	Danielsville
13-2	Karen Osborne Irwin	Democratic	Winterville
14	Charles W. Yeargin	Democratic	Elberton
15-1	E.M. (Buddy) Childers	Democratic	Rome
15-2	Forrest L. McKelvey	Democratic	Silver Creek
16	Paul E. Smith	Democratic	Rome
17	Bill Cumming	Democratic	Rockmart
18	Thomas B. Murphy	Democratic	Bremen
19	Boyd Petit	Democratic	Cartersville
20-1	Jack Vaughan	Republican	Marietta
20-2	G. Gresham Howren	Republican	Powder Springs
20-3	Herman Clark	Republican	Acworth
20-4	Steve Thompson	Democratic	Powder Springs
20-5	Earl Ehrhart	Republican	Powder Springs
21-1	Fred Aiken	Republican	Smyrna
21-2	Johnny Isakson	Republican	Marietta
21-3	Bill Atkins	Republican	Smyrna
21-4	Johnny Gresham	Republican	Marietta
21-5	Tom Wilder	Republican	Marietta
22	Dorothy Felton	Republican	Atlanta
23	Tom Campbell	Republican	Roswell
24	Kiliaen V.R. (Kil) Townsend	Republican	Atlanta
25	John M. Lupton, III	Republican	Atlanta
26	Jim Martin	Democratic	Atlanta
27	Dick Lane	Democratic	East Point
28	Bob Holmes	Democratic	Atlanta
29	Grace W. Davis	Democratic	Atlanta
30	Nan Orrock	Democratic	Atlanta
31	Mable Thomas	Democratic	Atlanta
32	Helen Selman	Democratic	Palmetto
33	Lanett Stanley	Democratic	Atlanta
34	Tyrone Brooks	Democratic	Atlanta
35	J.E. (Billy) McKinney	Democratic	Atlanta
36	Barbara H. Couch	Democratic	Hapeville
37	Georganna T. Sinkfield	Democratic	Atlanta
38	Lorenzo Benn	Democratic	Atlanta
39	Ralph David Abernathy III	Democratic	Atlanta
40	Cynthia Ann McKinney	Democratic	Atlanta
41	Charlie Watts	Democratic	Dallas
42	Thomas M. Kilgore	Democratic	Douglasville
43	Paul W. Heard, Jr.	Republican	Peachtree City
44	John Linder	Republican	Dunwoody
45	J. Max Davis	Republican	Atlanta
46	Doug Teper	Democratic	Atlanta
47	Chesley V. Morton	Republican	Tucker
48	Betty Jo Williams	Republican	Atlanta
49	Tom Lawrence	Republican	Stone Mountain
50	Frank L. Redding, Jr.	Democratic	Decatur
51	Thurbert E. Baker	Democratic	Decatur
52	Eleanor L. Richardson	Democratic	Decatur
53	Mary Margaret Oliver	Democratic	Decatur
54	Juanita Terry Williams	Democratic	Atlanta
55	Betty J. Clark	Democratic	Atlanta
56	Betty Aaron	Democratic	Atlanta
57-1	Troy A. Athon	Democratic	Conyers
57-2	William C. Mangum Jr.	Democratic	Decatur
57-3	Dean Alford	Democratic	Lithonia
58	Tommy Tolbert	Republican	Clarkston
59	O.M. (Mike) Barnett	Republican	Lilburn
60	Keith R. Breedlove	Republican	Buford
61	Vinson Wall	Republican	Lawrenceville
62	Charles E. Bannister	Republican	Lilburn
63	Bill Goodwin	Republican	Norcross
64	John O. Mobley, Jr.	Democratic	Winder
65	Tyrone Carrell	Democratic	Monroe
66	Frank E. Stancil	Democratic	Watkinsville
67	Michael L. Thurmond	Democratic	Athens
68	Lawton Evans Stephens	Democratic	Athens
69	Charles Thomas	Democratic	Temple
70	John Simpson	Democratic	Carrollton
71	Sidney Pope Jones, Jr.	Republican	Newnan
72-1	Bill Lee	Democratic	Forest Park
72-2	Jimmy W. Benefield	Democratic	Jonesboro
72-3	C.E. (Ed Holcomb)	Democratic	Jonesboro
72-4	Clay Davis	Republican	Jonesboro
72-5	Frank I. Bailey, Jr.	Democratic	Riverdale
73	Wesley Dunn	Democratic	McDonough
74	Denny M. Dobbs	Democratic	Covington
75	John P. Yates	Republican	Griffin
76	Suzi Johnson-Herbert	Democratic	Griffin
77	J. Crawford Ware	Democratic	Hogansville
78	Larry Smith	Democratic	Jackson
79	Marvin Adams	Democratic	Thomaston
80	Curtis S. Jenkins	Democratic	Forsyth
81	Wade Milam	Democratic	LaGrange
82	Edward D. Ricketson, Jr.	Democratic	Warrenton
83	William S. "Bill" Jackson	Democratic	Martinez
84	Bobby Harris	Democratic	Thomson
85	Charles W. Walker	Democratic	Augusta
86	Mike Padgett	Democratic	Augusta
87	Jack Connell	Democratic	Augusta
88	George M. Brown	Democratic	Augusta
89	Don Cheeks	Democrat	Augusta
90	Dick Ransom	Republican	Augusta
91	Leonard R. "Nookie" Meadows	Democratic	Manchester
92	Calvin Smyre	Democratic	Columbus
93	Roy D. Moultrie	Democratic	Hamilton
94	Sanford D. Bishop, Jr.	Democratic	Columbus
95	Thomas B. Buck	Democratic	Columbus
96	Pete Robinson	Democratic	Columbus
97	Robert H. Steele	Republican	Columbus
98	Robert F. Ray	Democratic	Fort Valley
99	Denmark Groover, Jr.	Democratic	Macon
100	Frank C. Pinkston	Democratic	Macon
101	William C. (Billy) Randall	Democratic	Macon
102	David E. Lucas	Democratic	Macon
103	Floyd M. Buford, Jr.	Democratic	Macon
104	Kenneth (Ken) W. Birdsong	Democratic	Gordon
105	Bobby Eugene Parham	Democratic	Milledgeville
106	George F. Green	Democratic	White Plains
107	Jimmy Lord	Democratic	Sandersville
108	Emory E. Bargeron	Democratic	Louisville
109	Larry J. "Butch" Parrish	Democratic	Swainsboro
110	John F. Godbee	Democratic	Brooklet
111	Bob Lane	Democratic	Statesboro
112	Ward Edwards	Democratic	Butler
113	Ted W. Waddle	Republican	Warner Robins
114	Roy H. (Sonny) Watson, Jr.	Democratic	Warner Robins
115	Larry Walker	Democratic	Perry
116	George Hooks	Democratic	Americus
117	Newt Hudson	Democratic	Rochelle
118	Terry L. Coleman	Democratic	Eastman
119	DuBose Porter	Democratic	Dublin
120	Fisher Barfoot	Democratic	Vidalia
121	Clinton Oliver	Democratic	Glennville
122	James L. (Jim) Pannell	Democratic	Savannah
123	Diane Harvey Johnson	Democratic	Savannah
124	DeWayne Hamilton	Democratic	Savannah
125	Jack Kingston	Republican	Savannah
126	Anne Mueller	Republican	Savannah
127	Roy L. Allen	Democratic	Savannah
128	Sonny Dixon	Democratic	Garden City
129	George A. Chance, Jr.	Democratic	Springfield
130	Gerald E. Greene	Democratic	Cuthbert
131	Bob Hanner	Democratic	Dawson
132	John White	Democratic	Albany
133	Tommy Chambless	Democratic	Albany
134	Mary Young-Cummings	Democratic	Albany
135	Johnny W. Floyd	Democratic	Cordele
136	Ray Holland	Democratic	Ashburn
137	Paul S. Branch, Jr.	Democratic	Fitzgerald
138	Hentry Bostic	Democratic	Tifton
139	Van Streat, Sr.	Democratic	Nicholls
140	Ralph J. Balkcom	Democratic	Blakely
141	Kermit F. "K" Bates, Jr.	Democratic	Bainbridge
142	Willis K. Long	Democratic	Cairo
143	Theo Titus, III	Republican	Thomasville
144	A. Richard Royal	Democratic	Camilla
145	C.J. Powell	Democratic	Moultrie
146	Hanson Carter	Democratic	Nashville
147	Henry L. Reaves	Democratic	Quitman
148	James M. Beck	Democratic	Valdosta
149	Robert L. Patten	Democratic	Lakeland
150	Tom Crosby, Jr.	Democratic	Waycross
151	Harry D. Dixon	Democratic	Waycross
152	Tommy R. Smith	Democratic	Alma
153-1	Lunsford Moody	Democratic	Baxley
153-2	Roger C. Byrd	Democratic	Hazlehurst
154	James M. Floyd	Democratic	Hinesville
155	Ronald (Ron) Fennel	Democratic	Brunswick
156	Willou Smith	Republican	Brunswick

== See also ==
- Georgia Senate
- Georgia House of Representatives
- List of Georgia state legislatures
