= 142nd Georgia General Assembly =

The 142nd Georgia General Assembly succeeded the 141st and served as the precedent for the 143rd General Assembly in 1995. The 142nd General Assembly of the U.S. state of Georgia convened its first session in January 1993, at the Georgia State Capitol in Atlanta. It was the first General Assembly in which posts within House districts were abolished.

== Members of the State Senate ==
District	Senator	Party	Residence
1	J. Tom Coleman, Jr.	(D)	Savannah
2	Roy L. Allen	(D)	Savannah
3	René D. Kemp	(D)	Hinesville
4	Jack Hill	(D)	Reidsville
5	Joe Burton	(R)	Atlanta
6	Edward E. Boshears	(R)	Brunswick
7	Peg Blitch	(D)	Homerville
8	Loyce W. Turner	(D)	Valdosta
9	Don Balfour	(R)	Stone Mountain
10	Nadine Thomas	(D)	Atlanta
11	Harold J. Ragan	(D)	Cairo
12	Mark Taylor	(D)	Albany
13	Rooney L. Bowen	(D)	Cordele
14	George Hooks	(D)	Americus
15	Ed Harbison	(D)	Columbus
16	Pete Robinson	(D)	Columbus
17	Mike Crotts	(R)	Conyers
18	Sonny Perdue	(D)	Bonaire
19	Walter S. Ray	(D)	Douglas
20	Hugh M. Gillis, Sr.	(D)	Soperton
21	Johnny Isakson	(R)	Marietta
22	Charles W. Walker	(D)	Augusta
23	Don Cheeks	(D)	Augusta
24	G. B. "Jake" Pollard Jr.	(D)	Appling
25	Wilbur E. Baugh	(D)	Milledgeville
26	Robert Brown	(D)	Macon
27	Edwin A. Gochenour	(R)	Macon
28	Arthur B. "Skin" Edge, IV	(R)	Newnan
29	Steve Langford Jr.	(D)	LaGrange
30	Wayne Garner	(D)	Carrollton
31	Nathan Dean	(D)	Rockmart
32	Hugh A. Ragan	(R)	Smyrna
33	Steve Thompson	(D)	Powder Springs
34	Pam Glanton	(R)	Riverdale
35	Arthur Langford, Jr.	(D)	Atlanta
36	David Scott	(D)	Atlanta
37	Chuck Clay	(R)	Marietta
38	Ralph David Abernathy, III	(D)	Atlanta
39	Ronald D. Slotin	(D)	Atlanta
40	Michael J. Egan	(R)	Atlanta
41	James W. (Jim) Tysinger	(R)	Atlanta
42	Mary Margaret Oliver	(D)	Decatur
43	Terrell Starr	(D)	Forest Park
44	John Parrish	(D)	Decatur
45	Harrill L. Dawkins	(D)	Conyers
46	Paul C. Broun	(D)	Athens
47	Eddie Madden	(D)	Elberton
48	Clinton M. Day	(R)	Norcross
49	Jane Hemmer	(D)	Gainesville
50	Guy Middleton	(D)	Dahlonega
51	David Ralston	(R)	Blue Ridge
52	Richard O. Marable	(D)	Rome
53	Waymond C. (Sonny) Huggins	(D)	LaFayette
54	Stephen B. Farrow	(D)	Dalton
55	Steve Henson	(D)	Stone Mountain
56	Sallie Newbill	(R)	Atlanta

== Members of the House of Representatives ==
District	Representative	Party	Residence
1	Brian D. Joyce	(R)	Lookout Mountain
2	Mike Snow	(D)	Chickamauga
3	McCracken (Ken) Poston, Jr.	(D)	Ringgold
4	Greg Kinnamon	(D)	Dalton
5	Harold Mann	(R)	Rocky Face
6	Charles N. Poag	(D)	Eton
7	Carlton H. Colwell	(D)	Blairsville
8	Ralph J. Twiggs	(D)	Hiawassee
9	William J. Dover	(D)	Clarkesville
10	Tom E. Shanahan	(D)	Calhoun
11	Tim Perry	(D)	Trion
12	Paul E. Smith	(D)	Rome
13	E. M. (Buddy) Childers	(D)	Rome
14	Jeff Lewis	(D)	White
15	Garland F. Pinholster	(R)	Ball Ground
16	Steve Stancil	(R)	Canton
17	Melanie Harris	(R)	Woodstock
18	Thomas B. Murphy	(D)	Bremen
19	David Hughes	(D)	Dawsonville
20	Bobby Lawson	(D)	Gainesville
21	James W. Mills	(R)	Gainesville
22	Mary Jeannette Jamieson	(D)	Toccoa
23	Alan T. Powell	(D)	Hartwell
24	John Scoggins	(D)	Danielsville
25	Tommy Stephenson	(D)	Commerce
26	Charlie Watts	(D)	Dallas
27	Bill Cummings	(D)	Rockmart
28	Mike A. Evans	(R)	Cumming
29	Bill Atkins	(R)	Smyrna
30	Matt Towery	(R)	Atlanta
31	Lynda Coker	(R)	Marietta
32	John W. Hammond	(D)	Marietta
33	Roy E. Barnes	(D)	Mableton
34	Jack Vaughan	(R)	Marietta
35	Tom Cauthorn	(D)	Atlanta
36	Earl Ehrhart	(R)	Powder Springs
37	Mitchell Adam Kaye Sr.	(R)	Marietta
38	Kem Shipp Sr.	(R)	Kennesaw
39	Kip Klein	(R)	Marietta
40	Steve Clark	(R)	Kennesaw
41	Mark Burkhalter	(R)	Alpharetta
42	Tom Campbell	(R)	Roswell
43	Dorothy Felton	(R)	Atlanta
44	Sharon Trense	(R)	Atlanta
45	Mitch J. Skandalakis	(R)	Atlanta
46	Kathy B. Ashe	(R)	Atlanta
47	Jim Martin	(D)	Atlanta
48	Grace W. Davis	(D)	Atlanta
49	Pamela Stanley	(D)	Atlanta
50	LaNett L. Stanley	(D)	Atlanta
51	J.E. (Billy) McKinney	(D)	Atlanta
52	Henrietta M. Canty	(D)	Atlanta
53	Bob Holmes	(D)	Atlanta
54	Tyrone D. Brooks	(D)	Atlanta
55	Dick Lane	(D)	East Point
56	Nan Orrock	(D)	Atlanta
57	Georganna T. Sinkfield	(D)	Atlanta
58	Sharon Beasley-Teague	(D)	College Park
59	Charles Barton (Bart) Ladd	(R)	Atlanta
60	J. Max Davis	(R)	Atlanta
61	Doug Teper	(D)	Atlanta
62	Tom Sherrill	(D)	Atlanta
63	Betty Jo Williams	(R)	Atlanta
64	Thomas E. Lawrence	(R)	Stone Mountain
65	Michele Henson	(D)	Stone Mountain
66	June Hegstrom	(D)	Scottdale
67	Mike Polak	(D)	Atlanta
68	JoAnn McClinton	(D)	Atlanta
69	Barbara J. Mobley	(D)	Decatur
70	Thurbert E. Baker	(D)	Decatur
71	Vernon A. Jones	(D)	Decatur
72	Mamie M. Randolph	(D)	Atlanta
73	Henrietta E. Turnquest	(D)	Decatur
74	Barbara J. Bunn	(R)	Conyers
75	Earl O'Neal	(D)	Conyers
76	Scott Dix	(R)	Snellville
77	Charles E. Bannister	(R)	Lilburn
78	Ron Crews	(R)	Tucker
79	Bill Goodwin	(R)	Norcross
80	Brooks P. Coleman, Jr.	(R)	Duluth
81	Ralph L. Johnston	(R)	Duluth
82	Vinson Wall	(R)	Lawrenceville
83	John David Dickinson	(R)	Snellville
84	Jere Johnson	(R)	Grayson
85	Keith R. Breedlove	(R)	Buford
86	John O. Mobley, Jr.	(D)	Winder
87	Tyrone Carrell	(D)	Monroe
88	Louise McBee	(D)	Athens
89	Keith G. Heard	(D)	Athens
90	Charles W. Yeargin	(D)	Elberton
91	Frank E. Stancil	(D)	Watkinsville
92	Denny M. Dobbs	(D)	Covington
93	Frank I. Bailey, Jr.	(D)	Riverdale
94	Bill Lee	(D)	Forest Park
95	Gail Buckner	(D)	Morrow
96	Jimmy W. Benefield	(D)	Atlanta
97	Dorothy Gail Johnson	(R)	Jonesboro
98	Bill Hembree	(R)	Douglasville
99	Dennis Chandler	(D)	Douglasville
100	Charles Thomas	(D)	Temple
101	John Simpson	(D)	Carrollton
102	Vance Smith, Jr.	(R)	Pine Mountain
103	Donna Staples Brooks	(R)	Newnan
104	Lynn Westmoreland	(R)	Tyrone
105	Daniel J. Lakly	(R)	Peachtree City
106	John P. Yates	(R)	Griffin
107	John Reid Carlisle	(D)	Griffin
108	Leland L. Maddox	(R)	Stockbridge
109	Larry Smith	(D)	Jackson
110	Curtis S. Jenkins	(D)	Forsyth
111	Mickey Channell	(D)	Greensboro
112	Bobby Harris	(D)	Thomson
113	Martha W. Moore	(R)	Evans
114	Robin L. Williams	(R)	Augusta
115	Jack Connell	(D)	Augusta
116	Bettieanne Childers Hart	(D)	Waynesboro
117	George M. Brown	(D)	Augusta
118	Henry Howard	(D)	Augusta
119	Mike Padgett	(D)	Augusta
120	Emory E. Bargeron	(D)	Louisville
121	Jimmy Lord	(D)	Sandersville
122	Bobby Eugene Parham	(D)	Milledgeville
123	Kenneth W. (Ken) Birdsong	(D)	Gordon
124	David E. Lucas, Sr.	(D)	Macon
125	Denmark Groover, Jr.	(D)	Macon
126	Robert A.B. Reichert	(D)	Macon
127	William C. (Billy) Randall	(D)	Macon
128	Robert Ray	(D)	Fort Valley
129	Mack Crawford	(R)	Zebulon
130	Wade Milam	(D)	LaGrange
131	Carl Von Epps	(D)	LaGrange
132	Ronnie Culbreth	(D)	Columbus
133	Carolyn Hugley	(D)	Columbus
134	Maretta Mitchell Taylor	(D)	Columbus
135	Thomas Bryant Buck III	(D)	Columbus
136	Calvin Smyre	(D)	Columbus
137	Jimmy Skipper	(D)	Americus
138	Johnny W. Floyd	(D)	Cordele
139	Roy H. "Sonny" Watson, Jr.	(D)	Warner Robins
140	Lynmore James	(D)	Montezuma
141	Larry Walker	(D)	Perry
142	Terry L. Coleman	(D)	Eastman
143	DuBose Porter	(D)	Dublin
144	Larry J. "Butch" Parrish	(D)	Swainsboro
145	John F. Godbee	(D)	Brooklet
146	Bob Lane	(D)	Statesboro
147	Ann R. Purcell	(D)	Rincon
148	Diane Harvey Johnson	(D)	Savannah
149	Dorothy B. Pelote	(D)	Savannah
150	Sonny Dixon	(D)	Garden City
151	Thomas C. Bordeaux, Jr.	(D)	Savannah
152	Anne Mueller	(R)	Savannah
153	Eric Johnson	(R)	Savannah
154	Clinton Oliver	(D)	Glennville
155	Fisher Barfoot	(D)	Vidalia
156	Newt Hudson	(D)	Rochelle
157	Ray Holland	(D)	Ashburn
158	Gerald E. Greene	(D)	Cuthbert
159	Bob Hanner	(D)	Dawson
160	Cathy Cox	(D)	Bainbridge
161	John White	(D)	Albany
162	Lawrence R. Roberts	(D)	Albany
163	Tommy Chambless	(D)	Albany
164	A. Richard Royal	(D)	Camilla
165	Henry Bostick	(D)	Tifton
166	Hanson Carter	(D)	Nashville
167	Van Streat	(D)	Nicholls
168	Harry D. Dixon	(D)	Waycross
169	Tommy Smith	(D)	Alma
170	Roger C. Byrd	(D)	Hazelhurst
171	Hinson Mosley	(D)	Jesup
172	James M. Floyd	(D)	Hinesville
173	Eugene C. Tillman	(D)	Brunswick
174	Willou Smith	(R)	Brunswick
175	Charles C. Smith, Jr.	(D)	St. Marys
176	Robert L. Patten	(D)	Lakeland
177	Tim Golden	(D)	Valdosta
178	Henry L. Reaves	(D)	Quitman
179	Kermit F. "K" Bates, Jr.	(D)	Bainbridge
180	Theo Titus III	(R)	Thomasville

== See also ==
- Georgia Senate
- Georgia House of Representatives
- List of Georgia state legislatures
