= 143rd Georgia General Assembly =

The 143rd Georgia General Assembly met for two sessions between January 9, 1995, and January 13, 1997. It consisted of the Georgia Senate and the Georgia House of Representatives.

== Officers ==
=== Senate ===
==== Presiding Officer ====
Position	Name	Party	District
President	Pierre Howard	Democrat	n/a
President Pro Tempore	Walter S. Ray	Democrat	19

==== Majority leadership ====
Position	Name	District
Senate Majority Leader	Sonny Perdue	18
Majority Caucus Chairman	Charles Walker	22
Majority Whip	Richard O. Marable	52

==== Minority leadership ====
Position	Name	District
Senate Minority Leader	Skin Edge IV	28
Minority Caucus Chairman	Don Balfour	9
Minority Whip	Sallie Newbill	56

=== House of Representatives ===
==== Presiding Officer ====
Position	Name	Party	District
Speaker of the House	Tom Murphy	Democrat	18
Speaker Pro Tempore	Jack Connell	Democrat	115

==== Majority leadership ====
Position	Name	District
House Majority Leader	Larry Walker	141
Majority Whip	Tommy Stephenson	25
Majority Caucus Chairman	Bill Lee	94
Majority Caucus Secretary	LaNett Stanley-Turner	50

==== Minority Leadership ====
Position	Name	District
House Minority Leader	Bob Irvin	45
Minority Whip	Earl Ehrhart	36
Minority Caucus Chairman	Mike Evans	28
Minority Caucus Vice Chairman	Garland Pinholster	15
Minority Caucus Secretary	Anne Mueller	152

== Members of the Georgia State Senate, 1995–1996 ==
The following is a list of senators who served during the first session in 1995.

District	Representative	Party	Residence	Counties represented
1	Eric Johnson	Republican	Savannah	Chatham
2	Diane Harvey Johnson	Democratic	Savannah	Bryan, Chatham, Effingham, Liberty
3	Rene D. Kemp	Democratic	Hinesville	Bryan, Glynn, Liberty, Long, McIntosh, Wayne
4	Jack Hill	Democratic	Reidsville	Bulloch, Effingham, Evans, Jenkins, Screven, Tattnall
5	Joe Burton	Republican	Atlanta	DeKalb, Gwinnett
6	Edward E. Boshears	Republican	Brunswick	Appling, Bacon, Brantley, Glynn, Pierce, Ware, Wayne
7	Peg Blitch	Democratic	Homerville	Berrien, Camden, Charlton, Clinch, Cook, Echols, Lanier, Tift, Ware
8	Loyce W. Turner	Democratic	Valdosta	Brooks, Decatur, Grady, Lowndes, Miller, Thomas
9	Don Balfour	Republican	Lilburn	Gwinnett
10	Nadine Thomas	Democratic	Atlanta	Clayton, DeKalb
11	Harold J. Ragan	Democratic	Cairo	Baker, Brooks, Colquitt, Decatur, Early, Grady, Lowndes, Mitchell, Seminole, Thomas
12	Mark Taylor	Democratic	Albany	Baker, Calhoun, Clay, Dougherty, Quitman, Randolph, Stewart, Terrell, Webster
13	Rooney L. Bowen	Democratic	Cordele	Ben Hill, Colquitt, Cook, Crisp, Dooly, Irwin, Mitchell, Turner, Worth
14	George Hooks	Democratic	Americus	Dougherty, Lee, Macon, Peach, Schley, Sumter, Taylor
15	Ed Harbison	Democratic	Columbus	Chattahoochee, Muscogee
16	Clay D. Land	Republican	Columbus	Harris, Marion, Muscogee, Talbot
17	Mike Crotts	Republican	Conyers	Butts, Henry, Newton, Rockdale
18	Sonny Perdue	Democratic	Bonaire	Bibb, Bleckley, Houston, Pulaski
19	Walter S. Ray	Democratic	Douglas	Atkinson, Ben Hill, Coffee, Dodge, Jeff Davis, Laurens, Telfair, Wilcox
20	Hugh Gillis	Democratic	Soperton	Candler, Emanuel, Johnson, Laurens, Montgomery, Toombs, Treutlen, Washington, Wheeler, Wilkinson
21	Johnny Isakson	Republican	Marietta	Cobb
22	Charles Walker	Democratic	Augusta	Burke, Richmond
23	Don Cheeks	Democratic	Augusta	Columbia, Richmond
24	Jake Pollard Jr.	Democratic	Appling	Columbia, Glascock, Jefferson, Lincoln, McDuffie, Morgan, Oconee, Oglethorpe, Warren, Wilkes
25	Floyd L. Griffin Jr.	Democratic	Milledgeville	Baldwin, Greene, Hancock, Jasper, Jefferson, Jones, Putnam, Taliaferro, Warren, Washington
26	Robert Brown	Democratic	Macon	Bibb, Jones, Twiggs, Wilkinson
27	Edwin A. Gochenour	Republican	Macon	Bibb, Crawford, Lamar, Monroe, Upson
28	Skin Edge IV	Republican	Newnan	Coweta, Fayette, Spalding
29	Steve Langford	Democratic	LaGrange	Harris, Heard, Meriwether, Pike, Spalding, Troup
30	Perry McGuire	Republican	Carrollton	Carroll, Douglas
31	Nathan Dean	Democratic	Rockmart	Bartow, Haralson, Paulding, Polk
32	Charlie Tanksley	Republican	Marietta	Cobb
33	Steve Thompson	Democratic	Powder Springs	Cobb
34	Pam Glanton	Republican	Riverdale	Clayton, Douglas, Fayette, Fulton
35	Donzella James	Democratic	College Park	Fulton
36	David Scott	Democratic	Atlanta	Fulton
37	Chuck Clay	Republican	Marietta	Cherokee, Cobb
38	Ralph David Abernathy III	Democratic	Atlanta	Cobb, Fulton
39	Ron Slotin	Democratic	Atlanta	Fulton
40	Michael J. Egan	Republican	Atlanta	Fulton
41	Jim Tysinger	Republican	Atlanta	DeKalb, Gwinnett
42	Mary Margaret Oliver	Democratic	Decatur	DeKalb
43	Connie Stokes	Democratic	Decatur	DeKalb
44	Terrell Starr	Democratic	Forest Park	Clayton
45	Bob Guhl	Republican	Social Circle	Barrow, Newton, Rockdale, Walton
46	Paul C. Broun Sr.	Democratic	Athens	Barrow, Clarke, Oconee
47	Eddie Madden	Democratic	Elberton	Banks, Elbert, Franklin, Hart, Jackson, Madison
48	Clint Day	Republican	Norcross	Forsyth, Fulton, Gwinnett
49	Casey Cagle	Republican	Chestnut Mountain	Forsyth, Hall
50	Guy Middleton	Democratic	Dahlonega	Dawson, Habersham, Lumpkin, Rabun, Stephens, Towns, Union, White
51	David Ralston	Republican	Blue Ridge	Cherokee, Fannin, Gilmer, Gordon, Pickens
52	Richard Marable	Democratic	Rome	Bartow, Floyd
53	John Black	Republican	Lookout Mountain	Chattooga, Dade, Walker, Whitfield
54	Steve Farrow	Democratic	Dalton	Catoosa, Murray, Whitfield
55	Steve Henson	Democratic	Stone Mountain	DeKalb
56	Sallie Newbill	Republican	Atlanta	Cherokee, Fulton, Gwinnett

== Members of the Georgia State House of Representatives, 1995–1996 ==
The following is a list of representatives who served during the first session in 1995.

District	Representative	Party	Residence	Counties represented
1	Brian D. Joyce	Republican	Lookout Mountain	Dade, Walker
2	Mike Snow	Democratic	Chickamauga	Catoosa, Walker
3	McCracken Poston	Democratic	Ringgold	Catoosa
4	Greg Kinnamon	Democratic	Dalton	Whitfield
5	Harold Mann	Republican	Rocky Face	Whitfield
6	Jerry Lifsey	Republican	Chatsworth	Fannin, Murray, Whitfield
7	Benjamin Norton Whitaker	Republican	East Ellijay	Fannin, Gilmer, Lumpkin, Union
8	Ralph Twiggs	Democratic	Hiawassee	Rabun, Towns, Union, White
9	Ben Purcell	Democratic	Clarkesville	Habersham, White
10	Tom E. Shanahan	Democratic	Calhoun	Gordon
11	Tim Perry	Democratic	Summerville	Chattooga, Floyd, Walker
12	Paul E. Smith	Democratic	Rome	Floyd
13	Buddy Childers	Democratic	Rome	Bartow, Floyd
14	Jeff Lewis	Democratic	White	Bartow
15	Garland F. Pinholster	Republican	Ball Ground	Cherokee, Pickens
16	Steve Stancil	Republican	Canton	Cherokee
17	Melanie Harris	Republican	Woodstock	Cherokee
18	Tom Murphy	Democratic	Bremen	Haralson, Paulding, Polk
19	Clint Smith	Republican	Dawsonville	Dawson, Hall
20	Carl Rogers	Democratic	Gainesville	Hall
21	James Mills	Republican	Gainesville	Hall
22	Mary Jeanette Jamieson	Democratic	Gainesville	Banks, Franklin, Stephens
23	Alan Powell	Democratic	Hartwell	Franklin, Hart
24	John Scoggins	Democratic	Danielsville	Clarke, Madison
25	Tommy Stephenson	Democratic	Commerce	Gwinnett, Hall, Jackson
26	Charlie Watts	Democratic	Dallas	Paulding
27	Bill Cummings	Democratic	Rockmart	Bartow, Polk
28	Mike A. Evans	Republican	Cumming	Forsyth
29	Randy J. Sauder	Republican	Smyrna	Cobb
30	Matt Towery	Republican	Atlanta	Cobb
31	Lynda Coker	Republican	Marietta	Cobb
32	Jim Woods	Republican	Marietta	Cobb
33	Roy Barnes	Democratic	Mableton	Cobb
34	John Wiles	Republican	Kennesaw	Cobb
35	George H. Grindley Jr.	Republican	Marietta	Cobb
36	Earl Ehrhart	Republican	Powder Springs	Cobb
37	Mitchell Kaye	Republican	Marietta	Cobb
38	Kem W. Shipp	Republican	Kennesaw	Cobb
39	Kip Klein	Republican	Marietta	Cobb
40	Don Parsons	Republican	Marietta	Cobb
41	Mark Burkhalter	Republican	Alpharetta	Fulton
42	Tom Campbell	Republican	Roswell	Fulton
43	Dorothy Felton	Republican	Atlanta	Fulton
44	Sharon Trense	Republican	Atlanta	Fulton
45	Bob Irvin	Republican	Atlanta	Fulton
46	Kathy Ashe	Republican	Atlanta	Fulton
47	Jim Martin	Democratic	Atlanta	Fulton
48	Grace W. Davis	Democratic	Atlanta	Fulton
49	Pamela Stanley	Democratic	Atlanta	Fulton
50	Lanett L. Stanley	Democratic	Atlanta	Fulton
51	Billy McKinney	Democratic	Atlanta	Cobb, Fulton
52	Henrietta M. Canty	Democratic	Atlanta	Fulton
53	Bob Holmes	Democratic	Atlanta	Fulton
54	Tyrone Brooks	Democratic	Atlanta	Fulton
55	Joe Heckstall	Democratic	East Point	Fulton
56	Nan Orrock	Democratic	Atlanta	Fulton
57	Georganna Sinkfield	Democratic	Atlanta	Fulton
58	Sharon Beasley-Teague	Democratic	Red Oak	Fulton
59	Bart Ladd	Republican	Atlanta	DeKalb
60	J. Max Davis	Republican	Atlanta	DeKalb
61	Doug Teper	Democratic	Atlanta	DeKalb
62	Tom Sherrill	Democratic	Atlanta	DeKalb
63	Betty Jo Williams	Republican	Atlanta	DeKalb
64	Thomas E. Lawrence	Republican	Stone Mountain	DeKalb
65	Michele Henson	Democratic	Stone Mountain	DeKalb
66	June Hegstrom	Democratic	Scottdale	DeKalb
67	Mike Polak	Democratic	Atlanta	DeKalb
68	Jo Ann McClinton	Democratic	Atlanta	DeKalb
69	Barbara J. Mobley	Democratic	Decatur	DeKalb
70	Thurbert Baker	Democratic	Decatur	DeKalb
71	Vernon Jones	Democratic	Decatur	DeKalb
72	Mamie M. Randolph	Democratic	Atlanta	DeKalb
73	Henrietta E. Turnquest	Democratic	Decatur	DeKalb
74	Barbara J. Bunn	Republican	Conyers	DeKalb, Rockdale
75	Earl O'Neal	Democratic	Conyers	DeKalb, Rockdale
76	Scott Dix	Republican	Stone Mountain	Gwinnett
77	Charles E. Bannister	Republican	Lilburn	Gwinnett
78	Ron Crews	Republican	Tucker	Gwinnett
79	Bill Goodwin	Republican	Norcross	Gwinnett
80	Brooks Coleman	Republican	Duluth	Gwinnett
81	Ralph L. Johnston	Republican	Duluth	Gwinnett
82	Vinson Wall	Republican	Lawrenceville	Gwinnett
83	Jeff Williams	Republican	Snellville	Gwinnett
84	Jere Johnson	Republican	Grayson	Gwinnett, Walton
85	Keith R. Breedlove	Republican	Buford	Forsyth, Gwinnett
86	John O. Mobley Jr.	Democratic	Winder	Barrow, Gwinnett
87	Len Walker	Republican	Loganville	Walton
88	Louise McBee	Democratic	Athens	Clarke
89	Keith G. Heard	Democratic	Athens	Clarke
90	Tom McCall	Democratic	Elberton	Elbert, Lincoln, Oglethorpe, Wilkes
91	Frank E. Stancil	Democratic	Watkinsville	Morgan, Newton, Oconee
92	Denny M. Dobbs	Democratic	Covington	Newton
93	Frank I. Bailey Jr.	Democratic	Riverdale	Clayton
94	Bill Lee	Democratic	Forest Park	Clayton
95	Gail Buckner	Democratic	Morrow	Clayton
96	Jimmy W. Benefield	Democratic	Jonesboro	Clayton
97	Dorothy Gail Johnson	Republican	Jonesboro	Clayton
98	Bill Hembree	Republican	Douglasville	Douglas
99	Bob Snelling	Republican	Douglasville	Douglas
100	Tracy Stallings	Democratic	Carrollton	Carroll
101	John Simpson	Democratic	Carrollton	Carroll
102	Vance C. Smith	Republican	Pine Mountain	Harris, Muscogee, Talbot, Troup
103	Donna Staples Brooks	Republican	Newnan	Coweta, Heard
104	Lynn Westmoreland	Republican	Tyrone	Coweta, Fayette
105	Dan Lakly	Republican	Peachtree City	Fayette
106	John P. Yates	Republican	Griffin	Coweta, Spalding
107	Bill Sanders	Republican	Griffin	Henry, Spalding
108	Leland L. Maddox	Republican	Stockbridge	Henry
109	Larry Smith	Democratic	Jackson	Butts, Henry, Lamar
110	Curtis S. Jenkins	Democratic	Forsyth	Jasper, Jones, Lamar, Monroe
111	Mickey Channell	Democratic	Greensboro	Greene, Putnam, Taliaferro, Warren, Wilkes
112	Joey Brush	Republican	Appling	Columbia, Lincoln, McDuffie
113	Ben L. Harbin	Republican	Augusta	Columbia
114	Robin L. Williams	Republican	Augusta	Columbia, Richmond
115	Jack Connell	Democratic	Augusta	Richmond
116	Bettieanne Childers Hart	Democratic	Waynesboro	Burke, Richmond
117	George M. Brown	Democratic	Augusta	Richmond
118	Henry L. Howard	Democratic	Augusta	Richmond
119	George L. DeLoach	Republican	Hephzibah	Burke, Richmond
120	Emory E. Bargeron	Democratic	Louisville	Columbia, Glascock, Jefferson, McDuffie, Warren
121	Jimmy Lord	Democratic	Sandersville	Baldwin, Hancock, Washington
122	Bobby Parham	Democratic	Milledgeville	Baldwin, Putnam
123	Ken Birdsong	Democratic	Gordon	Jones, Twiggs, Wilkinson
124	David Lucas	Democratic	Macon	Bibb
125	Sharon Falls	Republican	Macon	Bibb
126	Robert Reichert	Democratic	Macon	Bibb
127	Billy Randall	Democratic	Macon	Bibb
128	Robert Ray	Democratic	Fort Valley	Bibb, Crawford, Houston, Peach
129	Mack Crawford	Republican	Zebulon	Pike, Upson
130	Jeff Brown	Republican	LaGrange	Troup
131	Carl Von Epps	Democratic	LaGrange	Coweta, Meriwether, Troup
132	Ronnie Culbreth	Democratic	Columbus	Muscogee
133	Carolyn Hugley	Democratic	Columbus	Muscogee
134	Maretta Taylor	Democratic	Columbus	Chattahoochee, Muscogee
135	Tom Buck	Democratic	Columbus	Muscogee
136	Calvin Smyre	Democratic	Columbus	Muscogee
137	Jimmy Skipper	Democratic	Americus	Chattahoochee, Marion, Meriwether, Schley, Sumter, Talbot, Taylor
138	Johnny Floyd	Democratic	Cordele	Crisp, Dooly, Houston, Pulaski
139	Sonny Watson Jr.	Democratic	Warner Robins	Houston
140	Lynmore James	Democratic	Montezuma	Crawford, Dooly, Macon, Peach, Schley, Taylor
141	Larry Walker	Democratic	Perry	Crisp, Dooly, Houston
142	Terry Coleman	Democratic	Eastman	Bleckley, Dodge, Laurens, Telfair
143	DuBose Porter	Democratic	Dublin	Laurens
144	Butch Parrish	Democratic	Swainsboro	Emanuel, Johnson, Treutlen
145	John F. Godbee	Democratic	Brooklet	Bulloch, Candler, Jenkins
146	Bob Lane	Democratic	Statesboro	Bulloch, Screven
147	Ann R. Purcell	Democratic	Rincon	Bryan, Effingham
148	Regina Thomas	Democratic	Savannah	Chatham
149	Dorothy Barnes Pelote	Democratic	Savannah	Chatham
150	Sonny Dixon	Democratic	Garden City	Chatham
151	Tom Bordeaux	Democratic	Savannah	Chatham
152	Anne Mueller	Republican	Savannah	Chatham
153	Burke Day	Republican	Tybee Island	Chatham
154	Terry E. Barnard	Republican	Glennville	Bryan, Evans, Liberty, Tattnall
155	Fisher Barfoot	Democratic	Vidalia	Montgomery, Toombs, Wheeler
156	Newt Hudson	Democratic	Rochelle	Ben Hill, Irwin, Tift, Wilcox
157	Ray Holland	Democratic	Ashburn	Lee, Turner, Worth
158	Gerald Greene	Democratic	Cuthbert	Baker, Calhoun, Clay, Early, Marion, Mitchell, Quitman, Randolph, Stewart
159	Bob Hanner	Democratic	Parrott	Lee, Sumter, Terrell, Webster
160	Cathy Cox	Democratic	Bainbridge	Decatur, Early, Miller, Seminole
161	John White	Democratic	Albany	Baker, Dougherty
162	Lawrence R. Roberts	Democratic	Albany	Dougherty
163	Tommy Chambless	Democratic	Albany	Dougherty, Worth
164	A. Richard Royal	Democratic	Camilla	Colquitt, Decatur, Mitchell
165	Henry Bostick	Democratic	Tifton	Colquitt, Tift
166	Hanson Carter	Democratic	Nashville	Berrien, Colquitt, Cook
167	Van Streat	Democratic	Nicholls	Atkinson, Coffee
168	Harry D. Dixon	Democratic	Waycross	Ware
169	Tommy Smith	Democratic	Alma	Bacon, Brantley, Charlton, Glynn, Pierce
170	Roger C. Byrd	Democratic	Hazlehurst	Appling, Jeff Davis, Telfair, Wayne
171	Hinson Mosley	Democratic	Jesup	Liberty, Long, Pierce, Wayne
172	Buddy DeLoach	Republican	Hinesville	Liberty
173	Eugene C. Tillman	Democratic	Brunswick	Glynn, Liberty, McIntosh
174	Willou Smith	Republican	Brunswick	Glynn
175	Charlie Smith Jr.	Democratic	St. Marys	Camden, Charlton
176	Jay Shaw	Democratic	Lakeland	Clinch, Echols, Lanier, Lowndes
177	Tim Golden	Democratic	Valdosta	Brooks, Cook, Lowndes
178	Henry L. Reaves	Democratic	Quitman	Brooks, Lowndes, Thomas
179	K Bates Jr.	Democratic	Bainbridge	Decatur, Grady, Thomas
180	Theo Titus	Republican	Thomasville	Grady, Thomas
