= Party leaders of the Georgia State Senate =

The following are lists of party leaders of the Georgia State Senate. The positions of majority and minority leaders were established in the 1960s following the growth of minority caucuses in both houses.

== Majority leaders ==
- John R. Riley (Democratic, -1981)
- Thomas F. Allgood (Democratic, 1981-1991)
- Wayne Garner (Democratic, 1991-)
- Sonny Perdue (Democratic, -1997)
- Charles Walker (Georgia politician) (1997-2002)
- Tom Price (Republican, 2002-2003)
- Bill Stephens (Republican, 2003-2005)
- Tommie Williams (Republican, 2005-2009)
- Chip Rogers (Republican, 2009-2012)
- Ronnie Chance (Republican, 2012-2014)
- Bill Cowsert (Republican, 2014-2019)
- Mike Dugan (Republican, 2019-2023)
- Steve Gooch (Republican, 2023-2025)
- Jason Anavitarte (Republican, 2025-present)

== Governor's floor leaders ==
- Under Ernest Vandiver
  - Carl Sanders (1959)
- Carl Sanders
  - Julian Webb
- Under Joe Frank Harris
  - Don Johnson Jr. (assistant)
- Under Sonny Perdue
  - Preston Smith
  - Bill Heath
- Under Nathan Deal
  - Jim Butterworth
  - Butch Miller (2012, 2015-2016)
