= Sharon Trense =

American politician and author

Member of the Georgia House of Representatives from the 44th district
- In office January 11, 1993 – January 2000
- Preceded by: Bart Ladd

Personal details
- Born: November 23
- Spouse: Charles Trense
- Occupation: Author, politician
- Known for: Silent No More: Courageous Living in a World of Compromise

Sharon R. Trense is an American author and retired politician, who served in the Georgia House of Representatives from 1993 to 2000. A member of the Republican Party, she is also known for her book Silent No More: Courageous Living in a World of Compromise.

== See also ==
- 143rd Georgia General Assembly
- 142nd Georgia General Assembly
