= Rita Valenti =

American nurse, activist, and politician

Member of the Georgia House of Representatives from the 52nd district
- In office January 14, 1991 – January 11, 1993
- Preceded by: Eleanor L. Richardson
- Succeeded by: Henrietta M. Canty

Personal details
- Party: Democratic
- Profession: Nurse, activist

Rita Valenti is an American nurse, activist, and politician. She represented Georgia's 52nd House of Representatives district during the 141st Georgia General Assembly. She is most known for her advocacy in favor of universal health care.

== Career ==
Valenti worked as a registered nurse at Grady Memorial Hospital, working in the trauma, surgical intensive care, and infectious diseases clinics. She was a founding member of the Georgians for a Common Sense Health Plan, an advocacy group in favor of establishing a universal health care system.

Valenti represented Georgia's 52nd House of Representatives district during the 141st Georgia General Assembly, from 1991 to 1993. In 1992, Valenti introduced HB 1531, the Common Sense Health Plan, which would create a universal, single-payer healthcare program in Georgia. The program was designed to prioritize preventive care. It failed to pass committee.

=== Post-House career ===
After leaving the Georgia House of Representatives, Valenti continued working as a registered nurse at Grady Memorial Hospital. She also continued advocating for universal health care. She was a founding member of Project South, served on the board of Healthcare-NOW!, and is an active member of National Nurses United and Physicians for a National Health Program. Valenti was a spokesperson of disability rights group Let's Get Together, which in 1997 filed a lawsuit against the conversion of Blue Cross from a nonprofit to a for-profit company.

As of May 2026, Valenti is retired from nursing.

== Personal life ==
As of 2025, Valenti lives in Clarkston, Georgia.
