= Haskew Brantley =

American politician

Member of the Georgia House of Representatives
- In office 1967–1974

Member of the Georgia State Senate from the 56th district
- In office 1975–1987
- Succeeded by: Sallie Newbill

Personal details
- Born: September 28, 1922 Jefferson County, Georgia, U.S.
- Died: August 23, 2001 (aged 78)
- Party: Republican
- Spouse(s): Mirian Laughlin; Rose Marie Brantley
- Children: 4
- Education: Georgia Tech

Haskew Brantley (September 28, 1922 – August 23, 2001) was an American politician. He served as a Republican member of the Georgia House of Representatives. He also served as a member for the 56th district of the Georgia State Senate.

== Life and career ==
Brantley was born in Jefferson County, Georgia. He attended Georgia Tech, and then served in the United States Army during the World War II and the Korean War.

In 1967, Brantley was elected to the Georgia House of Representatives, serving until 1974. In 1975, he was elected to represent the 56th district of the Georgia State Senate. He served until 1987, when he was succeeded by Sallie Newbill.

Brantley died in August 2001 at the Southeast Regional Hospital, at the age of 78.
