= 1990 Georgia state elections =

1990 Georgia elections
- November 6, 1990

State, federal, and local elections were held in Georgia on November 6, 1990. Primaries were held on July 17, 1990, with primary runoffs being held on August 7, 1990.

== State elections ==
=== Governor ===
Democratic incumbent Zell Miller defeated Republican Johnny Isakson (who later became his successor as U.S. Senator) after defeating former Atlanta Mayor Andrew Young and future Governor Roy Barnes in the primary. Miller campaigned on the concept of term limits and pledged to seek only a single term as governor.

=== Lieutenant Governor ===
Democratic state senator Pierre Howard defeated State Senator Joe Kennedy in the Democratic primary then subsequently beat Republican nominee Matt Towery.

=== Attorney General ===
Democratic incumbent Mike Bowers won re-election unopposed.

=== Secretary of State ===
Democratic incumbent Max Cleland won re-election unopposed.

=== Superintendent of Schools ===
Democratic incumbent Werner Rogers won re-election unopposed.

=== Agriculture Commissioner ===
Democratic incumbent Tommy Irvin defeated Republican candidate Raymond Young 63.07-36.93.

=== Insurance Commissioner ===
Democratic incumbent Tim Ryles defeated Republican candidate Billy Lovett 51.30-48.70.

=== Labor Commissioner ===
Democratic incumbent Joe Tanner, who resigned from the position, remained on the ballot and won re-election unopposed.

=== Public Service Commission ===
In PSC Seat 1, Democratic incumbent Mac Barber defeated Republican candidate Jim West 61.25-38.75. In PSC Seat 2, Democratic incumbent Bob Durden defeated Libertarian candidate Elizabeth Goldin 81.83-18.17.

=== Georgia General Assembly ===
Members were elected to the 141st Georgia General Assembly. Democrats retained supermajorities in both chambers, and flipped one seat in the House. A census year, Democrats retained the legislative majorities to subsequently redraw the congressional and legislative maps for the 1992 Georgia state elections.

==== Statewide results ====
Summary of the November 6, 1990 Georgia State Senate election results
Party	Candidates	Votes	%	Seats	+/–	%
Republican	26		%	11	–	%
Democratic	50		%	45	–	%
Total	232		100.00%	180	–	

Summary of the November 6, 1990 Georgia House of Representatives election results
Party	Candidates	Votes	%	Seats	+/–	%
Republican	70		%	35	-1	%
Democratic	162		%	145	+1	%
Total	232		100.00%	180	–	
