= E. C. Tillman =

American politician from Georgia (1926–2009)

The Reverend E. C. Tillman

Member of the Georgia House of Representatives from the 173rd district
- In office January 11, 1993 – January 13, 2003
- Preceded by: Ron Fennel
- Succeeded by: Al Williams

Personal details
- Born: Eugene Ceasar Tillman; April 10, 1926 West Palm Beach, Florida, U.S.
- Died: July 29, 2009 (aged 83) Waycross, Georgia, U.S.
- Party: Democratic
- Spouses: Dorothy Dix Feely (m. 1948; div. 1964); Vivian Beatrice Vereen (m. 1964)
- Children: 4
- Education: Howard University (BS, MDiv)
- Occupation: Pastor; activist; politician

Military service
- Branch/service: United States Navy

Eugene Ceasar Tillman Sr. (April 10, 1926 – July 29, 2009) was an American Baptist minister and politician. The longtime pastor of Shiloh Baptist Church in Brunswick, Georgia, he represented the area as a member of the Georgia House of Representatives from 1993 to 2003.

== Early life and family ==
=== Childhood and education ===
Tillman was born on April 10, 1926, in West Palm Beach, Florida, to a large African American family. His parents, Will and Laura Tillman, were active members of the local Baptist church, and he and his eight siblings were made to study the Bible intensely.

Tillman attended local public schools, which were then segregated by race. In 1943, he graduated from Industrial High School as salutatorian and class president, and he entered Howard University in Washington, D.C. Majoring in psychology, he worked part-time as a busboy at the YWCA and Washington National Airport. After completing his undergraduate coursework, Tillman earned a Master of Divinity degree from Howard. He served in the United States Navy.

=== Marriages and children ===
Tillman was married twice and had four children: three sons and a daughter. After he and his first wife, Dorothy, divorced, he married Vivian Beatrice Vereen, the daughter of Mr. and Mrs. Eddie Vereen, at St. Paul African Methodist Episcopal Church in Ocala on September 13, 1964.

== Career ==
=== Ministry and activism ===
Tillman was first ordained as a minister at Washington, D.C.'s Shiloh Baptist Church, during his college years. In 1954, he moved to Daytona Beach, Florida to become pastor of Mount Bethel Baptist Church. During this time, he served on Governor LeRoy Collins's civil rights commission, led a Florida contingent of Freedom Riders on behalf of the NAACP, and campaigned for pro-civil rights gubernatorial candidate Robert King High.

In 1964, Tillman moved to Brunswick, Georgia become pastor of that city's Shiloh Baptist Church. He was the church's senior pastor until 2007.

=== Political campaigns ===
After moving to Brunswick, Tillman served on the Glynn County board of education. He was the Democratic Party nominee for the 155th district seat of the Georgia House of Representatives in the 137th, 138th, and 139th General Assemblies, losing to Republican opponents Shaw McVeigh in 1982 and Virginia Ramsey in 1984 and 1986. In 1988, he was elected as a county commissioner.

The Georgia state legislature approved new district lines in advance of the 1992 elections for the 142nd General Assembly, and Tillman ran successfully for the newly-drawn 173rd House district seat. He was reelected in 1994, 1996, 1998, and 2000. He decided not to run in the 2002 election, after which Brunswick was part of the new 128th district.

== Later life and death ==
Tillman died on July 29, 2009, at Waycross Health and Rehabilitation Center in Waycross, Georgia.
