= Bill Cummings (politician) =

Georgia state legislator (1929-2014)

William F. "Bill" Cummings (March 1, 1929 - October 4, 2014) was an educator and state legislator in Georgia. He served in the Georgia House of Representatives. He lived in Rockmart and represented Polk County, Georgia. He served in the Georgia House for 26 years. He was a member of the University of West Georgia Board of Trustees from 1982 to 1994.

He was born in Chester, South Carolina. He grew up in Rockmart and graduated from Rockmart High School in 1947. He served in the 82nd Airborne.
