= Ron Crews =

American football player (1956–2003)

No. 93
- Position: Nose tackle

Personal information
- Born: October 9, 1956; Springfield, Illinois, U.S.
- Died: October 23, 2003 (aged 47); Las Vegas, Nevada, U.S.
- Listed height: 6 ft 4 in (1.93 m)
- Listed weight: 256 lb (116 kg)

Career information
- College: Notre Dame; UNLV
- NFL draft: 1980: 4th round, 99th overall pick

Career history
- Cleveland Browns (1980); Buffalo Bills (1982)*
- * Offseason or practice squad member only

Career NFL statistics
- Games played: 16
- Stats at Pro Football Reference

Ronald Edwards Crews (October 9, 1956 – October 23, 2003) was an American professional football nose tackle in the National Football League (NFL).

== Early life ==
Crews was born on October 9, 1956, in Springfield, Illinois. He attended Columbia High School.

== College career ==
Crews played for one year at Notre Dame and three years at UNLV. At UNLV, Crews recorded one touchdown in the 1978 season.

== Professional career ==
Crews was drafted by the Cleveland Browns in the 4th round with the 99th pick in the 1980 NFL draft. Crews only played in the 1980 season, where he played in all 16 games. He was released after the year.

== Personal life and death ==
After his NFL career, Crews became a firefighter for Las Vegas Fire and Rescue where he served for 17 years. On October 21, 2003, Crews died due to cancer.
