= Sallie Newbill =

American politician

Sallie Newbill was a state legislator in Georgia. A Republican, she served in the Georgia Senate representing part of Atlanta in northern Fulton County.

She succeeded Haskew Brantley. She was succeeded by Tom Price.

She married Thomas Carroll Newbill Jr. They lived in Atlanta for 36 years before returning to Franklin County.

She represented the 56th District. She helped Newt Gingrich campaign in 1994. She served as Minority Whip in the 140th Georgia General Assembly.

== See also ==
- 139th Georgia General Assembly
- 142nd Georgia General Assembly
- 143rd Georgia General Assembly
