= John Black (Georgia politician) =

American politician

John Cannon "J. L." Black
- Born: June 27, 1933
- Died: November 25, 2017 (aged 84)
- Occupation: politician

John Cannon "J. L." Black (June 27, 1933 – November 25, 2017) was an American politician who represented Georgia in the State Senate from 1994 to 1996.

Born in 1933 to Aubrey and Bessie Black, Black served in the United States Air Force during the Korean War and later in the Army. Before entering politics, he worked for Combustion Engineering. Following his time in the state senate, Black became pastor of the Trinity Holiness Church. He married Delma Lee York in 1957, and together they had three children: Aubrey Lee Black, Annette Black Anderson, and Janice Kay Black Parker.
