= Thomas F. Allgood =

American politician

Member of the Georgia State Senate from the 22nd district
- In office 1977–1991

Personal details
- Born: September 10, 1928 Richmond County, Georgia, U.S.
- Died: August 4, 2000 (aged 71)
- Party: Democratic
- Spouse: Thelma Ray
- Children: 4
- Education: Augusta University; Emory University School of Law

Thomas F. Allgood (September 10, 1928 – August 4, 2000) was an American politician. He served as a Democratic member for the 22nd district of the Georgia State Senate.

== Life and career ==
Allgood was born in Richmond County, Georgia. He served in the United States Army for a year. After that, Allgood attended Augusta University and Emory University School of Law, receiving two law degrees.

Allgood was an attorney. In 1977, he was elected to represent the 22nd district of the Georgia State Senate and became majority leader in 1981. He left office in 1991 when he retired.

Allgood died in August 2000 in a plane crash, at the age of 71, along with his wife, Thelma and his pilot, Steve Patterson.
