= Kiliaen Townsend =

American politician (1918–2008)

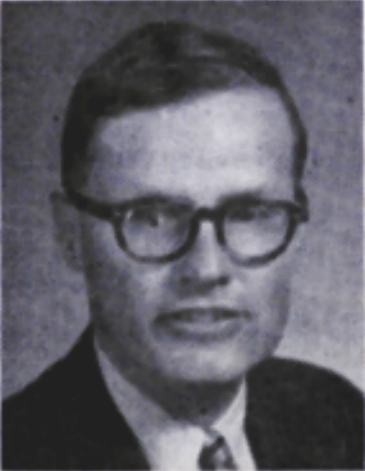

Member of the Georgia House of Representatives
- In office January 10, 1966 – January 13, 1992
- Constituency: 140th, 115th, 24th

Personal details
- Born: October 6, 1918 Garden City, New York, U.S.
- Died: March 23, 2008 (aged 89) Atlanta, Georgia, U.S.
- Party: Republican
- Spouse: Mary Campbell Everett (m. 1945; died 1977)
- Children: 2

Kiliaen Van Rensselaer Townsend (October 6, 1918 – March 23, 2008) was an American politician who represented Fulton County in the Georgia House of Representatives. Townsend is notable for being one of the first Republicans elected to the state house since Reconstruction. He was the longest serving Republican legislator when he retired in 1992.

== Early life ==
A direct descendant of Kiliaen Van Rensselaer, Townsend was born on October 6, 1918, in Garden City, New York. He attended the Browning School in New York City and later the Pawling School. After graduating, he attended Williams College and the University of Virginia Law School. During World War II, he enlisted in the Counter Intelligence Corps. After the war, he moved to Georgia.

== Career ==
After moving to Georgia in 1946, he practiced law. Townsend helped reorganize the state Republican Party. In 1948, he helped garner support for Thomas E. Dewey. In 1952, he served as an alternate delegate the 1952 Republican National Convention, and was instrumental in the nomination of Dwight D. Eisenhower.

In 1965, he was elected to the Georgia House of Representatives representing Fulton County, the first since Reconstruction.

During his tenure, he was one of the five white representatives who voted to seat Julian Bond in the state legislature in 1966. The state legislature had removed Bond due to his anti-war positions.

Townsend had also introduced legislation to establish a state lottery, and more controversially, legislation to consolidate Georgia's 159 counties.

Townsend died on March 23, 2008, aged 89 in Atlanta.

== Political views ==
Townsend developed a reputation as a moderate Republican. During his years serving in the Georgia House, he supported abortion rights and legal prostitution.

== Personal life ==
He married his wife, Mary Campbell Everett on May 9, 1945. Together, they had one son. His wife predeceased him on January 1, 1977.
