= Jimmy Hodge Timmons =

American politician

Jimmie Hodge Timmons

Member of the Georgia State Senate from the 11th district
- In office 1975–1992
- Preceded by: Julian Webb

Personal details
- Born: June 11, 1939 Calhoun County, Georgia, U.S.
- Died: April 5, 2011 (aged 71) Albany, Georgia, U.S.
- Party: Democratic
- Spouse: Mary Jane Hutchings
- Education: Abraham Baldwin Agricultural College; University of Georgia; Auburn University

Jimmy Hodge Timmons Jr. (June 11, 1939 – April 5, 2011) was an American politician. He served as a Democratic member for the 11th district of the Georgia State Senate.

== Life and career ==
Timmons was born in Calhoun County, Georgia, the son of Jimmy Hodge Timmons Sr. and Lucille Daniels. He attended Damascus High School, graduating in 1956. He also attended Abraham Baldwin Agricultural College, the University of Georgia and Auburn University.

In 1975, Timmons was elected to represent the 11th district of the Georgia State Senate. He left office in 1992. He was a member of the Arlington Baptist Church.

Timmons died in April 2011 at the Phoebe Putney Memorial Hospital in Albany, Georgia, at the age of 71. In 2012, he was posthumously honored with his own highway.
