= Jerry Max Davis =

American politician

Member of the Georgia House of Representatives from the 45th district
- In office 1981 – 2002 (died in office)
- Preceded by: George Williamson

Personal details
- Born: October 22, 1937 Carroll County, Georgia, U.S.
- Died: November 2, 2002 (aged 65)
- Party: Republican
- Spouse: Mary Donna Thomas
- Children: 3
- Education: University of Georgia

Jerry Max Davis (October 22, 1937 – November 2, 2002) was an American politician. A lawyer, he served as a Republican member for the 45th district of the Georgia House of Representatives.

== Life and career ==
J. Max Davis was born in Carroll County, Georgia, and grew up in the Atco-Goodyear textile mill village, in Cartersville, Georgia . He attended the University of Georgia and Woodrow Wilson College of Law. Max briefly played American football professionally for the Kansas City Chiefs, and later worked as an insurance claims representative, and later still as a lawyer.

In 1981, Davis was elected to the 45th district of the Georgia House of Representatives, covering part of Atlanta, succeeding George Williamson. Described as a conservative Republican, he served until his death, at which time he was the ranking member of the House Judiciary Committee. Following a reapportionment in the Georgia House, and a lost primary, he was due to end his term in the House at the end of 2002.

Davis died in November 2002 at the age of 65, of a heart attack after attending a campaign meeting for George Bush. His funeral was held at the Church of The Apostles in Atlanta.

Davis was married to Mary, and they had three children, Jerry Max Davis II, Todd Davis and Stacie Davis Rapson.

His son, J. Max Davis II, served as the first mayor of Brookhaven, Georgia.
