= Marvin Adams =

American nuclear engineer and computational physicist

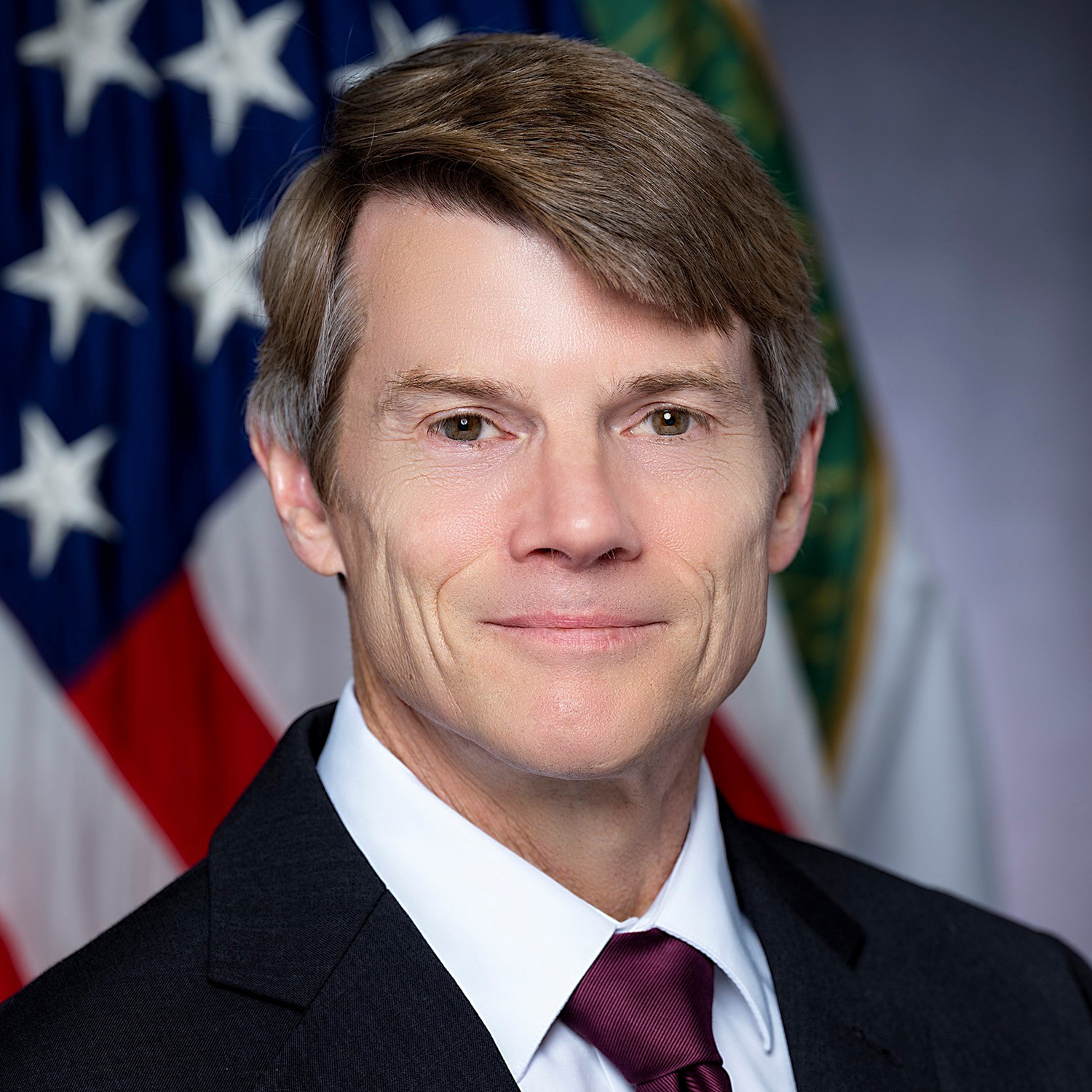

Deputy Administrator of the National Nuclear Security Administration for Defense Programs
- Incumbent
- Assumed office April 11, 2022
- President: Joe Biden
- Preceded by: Charles P. Verdon

Personal details
- Born: Marvin L. Adams

Marvin L. Adams is a nuclear engineer and computational physicist. Since April 2022, he has served as Deputy Administrator for Defense Programs at the National Nuclear Security Administration (NNSA) in the Biden administration.

== Education ==
Adams received his Ph.D. and M.S. degrees from the University of Michigan in nuclear engineering and his B.S. degree from Mississippi State University.

== Career ==
From 1986 until 1992, Adams worked at Lawrence Livermore National Laboratory (LLNL) as a physicist. From 1992 until 2022, he was a professor of Nuclear Engineering at the Texas A&M University.

He is currently a member of the stockpile assessment team of the Strategic Advisory Group for the U.S. Strategic Command, the National Academies Committee on International Security and Arms Control, and the Predictive Science Panel for LNLL and Los Alamos National Laboratory (LANL). He is also chairman of the Mission Committee and member of the Science, Technology, and Engineering Committee. Adams served in various roles for the U.S. national security.

In September 2021, President Joe Biden appointed Adams to the President’s Council of Advisors on Science and Technology (PCAST). Two months later, President Biden announced the nomination of Adams to become deputy administrator for defense programs at the National Nuclear Security Administration. The nomination was confirmed by the United States Senate on April 6, 2022, and Adams was sworn in on April 11, 2022.

“I am grateful to President Biden for nominating Marvin Adams to serve as Deputy Administrator for Defense Programs of the National Nuclear Security Administration (NNSA). Marvin is a unique success story, having started his career at a DOE Lab and now regarded as the nation’s foremost academic expert on safeguarding our nuclear stockpile.”

— Jennifer Granholm, United States Secretary of Energy
