= Lundsford Moody =

American politician (1929–2006)

Member of the Georgia House of Representatives
- In office 1979–1993

Personal details
- Born: July 30, 1929 Baxley, Georgia, U.S.
- Died: April 17, 2006 (aged 76) Baxley, Georgia, U.S.
- Party: Democratic

Robert Lundsford Moody (July 30, 1929 – April 17, 2006) was an American politician in the state of Georgia. He was a member of the Georgia House of Representatives from when he was first elected in 1978 until he retired in 1992. He was a member of the Democratic party.

== Personal life ==
Moody was survived by his two sons, nephews Jim Collins and Jay Hamilton (both Georgia lobbyists), and great niece, Grace Lauren Hamilton.
