= Hinson Mosley =

American politician (1932–2026)

Member of the Georgia House of Representatives
- In office 1992–2006

Personal details
- Born: October 21, 1932 Hazlehurst, Georgia, U.S.
- Died: September 1, 2026 (aged 93)
- Party: Democratic

George Hinson Mosley (October 21, 1932 – September 1, 2026) was an American politician. He was a member of the Georgia House of Representatives from 1992 to 2006. Mosley was a member of the Democratic Party.

Mosley died on September 1, 2026, at the age of 93.
