= Henrietta Canty =

Politician in the state of Georgia, USA

Henrietta Mathis Canty (October 23, 1928 - 2002) was a politician in the state of Georgia. She served in the Georgia House of Representatives from 1975 to 1980 and from 1990 to 1998. A Democrat, she became a Republican before returning to the Democratic Party. At other times in her career, Canty was a teacher and a salesperson.

She was born in Abbeville, South Carolina. James Henry Mathis and the late Sophronia Cater Mathis-Edwards were her parents.

Canty received her undergrad from Johnson C. Smith University in Charlotte, North Carolina and a master's degree in finance from UPenn. She married Clarence Canty and had a daughter and four sons.

In 1977, she was the plaintiff in a discrimination lawsuit and earlier in that same decade she was one of several Black lawmakers whose taxes came under increased scrutiny.
