= Bart Ladd =

American politician (born 1957)

Member of the Georgia State Senate from the 41st district
- In office January 11, 1999 – January 13, 2003
- Preceded by: Jim Tysinger
- Succeeded by: Steve Henson

Member of the Georgia House of Representatives from the 59th district
- In office January 11, 1993 – January 11, 1999
- Preceded by: Mike Barnett
- Succeeded by: Fran Millar

Member of the Georgia House of Representatives from the 44th district
- In office January 14, 1991 – January 11, 1993
- Preceded by: John Linder
- Succeeded by: Sharon R. Trense

Personal details
- Born: July 18, 1957 (age 69) Boston, Massachusetts, U.S.
- Spouse: Christina
- Children: 2
- Education: Purdue University (BS)

Charles Barton Ladd (born July 18, 1957) is an American former politician in the state of Georgia.

Ladd was born in the city of Boston, Massachusetts. He is an alumnus of Purdue University, receiving a degree in mechanical engineering. He served eight years as a C-130 aircraft commander. He served in the Georgia House of Representatives from 1991 to 1999 and the Georgia State Senate from 1999 to 2003. He lost reelection to the State Senate in 2002. He ran for the State Senate again in 2004, but lost the Republican primary. He and his wife, Christina, have two daughters. He is a pilot for Delta Air Lines.

In 2011, Ladd and his family moved to Maine. In 2016, Ladd ran for the Maine Senate, challenging incumbent Senator Cathy Breen. However, he lost the general election.

Georgia House of Representatives
Preceded by John Linder	Member of the Georgia House of Representatives from the 44th district 1991–1993	Succeeded by Sharon R. Trense
Preceded by Mike Barnett	Member of the Georgia House of Representatives from the 59th district 1993–1999	Succeeded by Fran Millar
Georgia State Senate
Preceded by Jim Tysinger	Member of the Georgia State Senate from the 41st district 1999–2003	Succeeded by Steve Henson
