= Tom Coleman (Georgia politician) =

American politician and businessman (1928–2014)

Commissioner of the Georgia Department of Transportation
- In office June 6, 2000 – August 31, 2003
- Appointed by: Roy Barnes

Member of the Georgia Board of Regents
- In office 1995–2000
- Appointed by: Zell Miller

Member of the Georgia State Senate from the 1st district
- In office January 12, 1981 – January 9, 1995
- Preceded by: John R. Riley
- Succeeded by: Eric Johnson

Personal details
- Born: September 8, 1928 Savannah, Georgia, U.S.
- Died: June 4, 2014 (aged 85) Savannah, Georgia, U.S.
- Party: Democratic
- Spouse: Mary McGrath
- Children: 6
- Education: Georgia Institute of Technology
- Profession: Construction Company Owner

Military service
- Allegiance: United States of America
- Branch/service: United States Army; U.S. Army Reserve
- Rank: Captain

J. Thomas Coleman Jr. (September 8, 1928 – June 4, 2014) was an American politician and businessman.

== Early life and education ==
Tom Coleman was born in Savannah, Georgia, on September 8, 1928. He was a graduate of Benedictine Military School. Coleman received his bachelor's degree from Georgia Institute of Technology where he was captain of the football team. After graduation, Coleman stayed on at Georgia Tech as a physics teacher and football coach. Coleman enlisted in the U.S. Army, serving as an infantry captain during the Korean conflict and, in later years, the U.S. Army Reserve.

== Business and political careers ==
Coleman was the owner of Bonitz of Georgia, a construction company which he started in 1954, and where he remained as board chairman until his death. Coleman began his political career as a Savannah City Council alderman during the Malcolm Maclean administration from 1962 to 1966. He was then elected Chairman of the Chatham County Commission, where he served from 1972 to 1976. During his term as Commission chairman, Coleman led the initiative to build the Chatham County Courthouse and jail. In 1980 Coleman was elected to the Georgia State Senate, and took office, representing District 1, in 1981. He was elected to seven consecutive terms, serving a total of 14 years, until he stepping down in 1995. In the Senate, Coleman was Chairman of the Senate Transportation Committee and a member of the Appropriations Committee for 12 years and member of Continuation Committee for ten years. In 1995, after leaving the Senate, Coleman was appointed by Governor Zell Miller to an at-large seat on the University System of Georgia Board of Regents. In the post he served as Vice Chair and later Chair of the Facilities and Real Estate Committee. Coleman was appointed director of the Georgia Department of Transportation by Governor Roy Barnes, during a period of upheaval, and served from June 6, 2000, to August 31, 2003, extending into the Administration of Governor Sonny Perdue.

== Later years ==
Coleman, who suffered from Alzheimer's disease in his later years, died in his native Savannah on June 4, 2014, at the age of 85.

== Legacy ==
The portion of I-95 in Chatham County, Georgia is named the Tom Coleman Highway. The Courthouse in Chatham County is also named in his honor as the J. Tom Coleman Courthouse - Judicial Center
