= Wyc Orr =

American politician (1946–2014)

Eston Wycliffe "Wyc" Orr, Sr. (October 28, 1946 – May 28, 2014) was an American politician and lawyer.

== Early life and education ==
Orr was born in Tifton, Georgia on October 28, 1946, the son of Emogene Gaskins Orr and John Hughes Orr Sr. He attended local schools, where he excelled in both athletics and academics. Upon graduation from Tift County High School, he delivered the graduating class valedictory address. Orr received his bachelor's degree, with honors, from Auburn University where he graduated first in his business school class. He then obtained his J.D. degree from University of Tennessee College of Law, where he graduated first in his class, Order of the Coif and was a law review editor.

== Law career and public office ==
After graduating from law school, Orr embarked on a career in law that would span the next 43 years. It included service in the United States Army, in the Judge Advocate General's Corps where he was commissioned captain. He then established a law practice in Gainesville, Georgia, at the firm that became Orr & Brown. In addition to his law practice, Orr managed the family farm and timber business. Orr served in the Georgia House of Representatives from 1989 to 1993, as a Democrat. In 1992, he ran for a seat for the United States House of Representatives and lost the election.

== Death ==
Orr died in Atlanta, Georgia on May 28, 2014 after being diagnosed with cancer.
