= Dorothy Barnes Pelote =

American politician (1929–2015)

Dorothy Barnes Pelote (December 30, 1929 – January 18, 2015) was a member of the Georgia State House of Representatives.

== Early background ==
Born on December 30, 1929, in Lancaster, South Carolina, the daughter of Abraham Barnes and Ethel Green, she married Maceo R. Pelote by whom she had two daughters, Deborah and Miriam. Before entering politics, Barnes Pelote, who has African-American heritage and is African Methodist Episcopalian, was a school teacher.

== Political career ==
A Democrat, she then served as Chatham County Commissioner. In 1992, she was elected to the Georgia House of Representatives for a two-year term and was re-elected four times. She represented the Savannah-based 149th Representative District.

Dorothy Barnes Pelote was noted for her efforts to promote public awareness of the dangers of ovarian cancer, as well as for proposing more unusual legislative proposals. She introduced a bill that would make it a crime for anyone to answer the door naked.

"Former Savannah Georgia, legislator Dorothy Pelote became a fierce advocate for black Florida and Georgia residents whose communities were visited by swarms of disease-carrying mosquitoes released by the CIA during the 1950s and 1960s. CIA documents suggest that scientists in the MK-ULTRA Project experimented with such biological exposures in black communities in order to determine whether such releases would be effective against foreign enemies."

== Death ==
She died on January 18, 2015, surrounded by her family at her Savannah, Georgia home, aged 85. A widow, she was survived by her two daughters and extended family.

== Honors ==
In 2006, the Georgia Legislature passed a resolution to designate the Dorothy Barnes Pelote Bridge to honor her.

Carver Heights (Savannah, GA) Community Service Award, 1981–82; Rep Roy Allen Award, 1982; Minority Women of the Year, Zeta Phi Beta, 1984; Dorothy Pelote Day City Savannah & Chatham County, 1985.

Special Achievements: First Female elected County Commissioner Chairman Pro Tem; one of the first Black females to be elected to the Chatham County Commission; State Board Postsecondary Vocational Educator by appointment of the Governor GA selected Vice President Black Caucus Asn County Commission GA; Testimonial Banquet by Constituents of Eighth Comn District

== See also ==
- Georgia General Assembly
- Georgia State House of Representatives
- Savannah, Georgia

Georgia House of Representatives
Preceded by Roy Allen (D)	Georgia State Representative from 149th district 1993–2003	Succeeded by Redistricting
