= Bill Hasty =

American politician

Member of the Georgia State Senate from the 51st district
- In office January 14, 1991 – January 11, 1993
- Preceded by: Max R. Brannon
- Succeeded by: David Ralston

Member of the Georgia House of Representatives from the 8th district
- In office January 8, 1979 – January 14, 1991
- Preceded by: Max Roach Looper
- Succeeded by: Garland F. Pinholster

Personal details
- Born: William Grady Hasty; March 6, 1922 Canton, Georgia, U.S.
- Died: November 5, 2003 (aged 81) Canton, Georgia, U.S.
- Party: Democratic
- Spouse: Hazel Wyatt
- Children: 3
- Education: Reinhardt College; Oglethorpe University (AB); Mercer University (MEd)

Military service
- Allegiance: United States
- Branch/service: United States Navy
- Years of service: 1942–1945
- Battles/wars: World War II

William Grady Hasty (March 6, 1922 – November 5, 2003) was an American politician from Georgia known for his service in the Georgia General Assembly.

== Early life and education ==
Hasty was born in Canton, Georgia, in 1922, and was raised on a farm in Cherokee County. In 1942, he enlisted in the United States Navy and served for the remainder of World War II. After completing his service, Hasty attended Oglethorpe University, from which he graduated in 1948.

After graduating, Hasty worked as a teacher in a one-room schoolhouse in Cherokee County. He became a high school principal and, in 1952, the county school superintendent. Accordingly, earned a Master of Education degree from Mercer University in 1952.

From 1969 to 1977, he was the assistant director of Probation at the Georgia Department of Probation and Correction.

== Political career ==
Hasty was elected to the Georgia House of Representatives from Cherokee, Dawson, and Pickens counties in 1978, and went on to serve six terms in the chamber. In 1990, Hasty successfully ran for the Georgia State Senate. He served in that body for just two years.

Hasty was named to the Georgia Department of Transportation Board in 1995, and became chairman in April 2002. He left the board after being drawn into the same district as Vice Chair Steve Reynolds.

== Personal life and death ==
Hasty was a Baptist. He wrote a regular column in the Cherokee Tribune and published two books of county history.

Hasty died of cancer in his hometown of Canton in 2003, at the age of 81. He was survived by his wife, Hazel.
