= Robin L. Williams =

American politician

Member of the Georgia House of Representatives for the 90th district
- In office 1991–1993
- Preceded by: Dick Ransom

Member of the Georgia House of Representatives for the 114th district
- In office 1993–2001
- Succeeded by: Sue Burmeister

Personal details
- Born: December 8, 1961 (age 64)
- Party: Republican
- Education: Georgia Military College
- Profession: Businessman

Robin L. Williams (born December 12, 1961) is an American businessman and former member of the Georgia House of Representatives.

== Early years and education ==
Born December 8, 1961, he is the youngest child of Joseph and Joyce Williams. After attending Harlem High School (Harlem, Georgia), Williams graduated from Georgia Military College and also served in the United States Air Force from 1979 to 1983 as a Nuclear Security Supervisor.

== Political career ==
Williams was first elected to the Georgia House of Representatives in 1991, representing District 90. Two years later, after reapportionment he was drawn into District 114, a seat that he won in the November election. He went on to represent that district for eight more years. He was a member of the Appropriations, Health and Ecology, Insurance, and Intra-Governmental Coordination committees. He introduced Bills and helped pass legislation relating to improvements in health care, education, and state infrastructure.

As a volunteer for the International Republican Institute, Williams made six trips to Russia assisting with the training of Russian citizens in democratic election and campaign procedures. Recalling his 1991 trip as an observer of the first free elections, he said, "I vividly remember seeing holes in buildings from the attempted overthrow of the government. It was a harsh but compelling reminder of the value of democracy."

After Williams' tenure as a lawmaker, he continued his career in the marketing industry.

== Criminal conviction ==
In May 2004 Williams and four others were indicted on charges related to the theft of more than $2 million from the Community Mental Health Center of East Central Georgia. In 2005, in U.S. District Court, Williams was convicted on all 17 counts related to conspiracy, bribery, theft, health care fraud and money laundering. Upon conviction, he was sentenced to 10 years in federal prison. Williams also conceded to civil forfeiture of $400,000.

Prior to release from Federal prison, Williams again appealed his conviction based upon a 2010 Supreme Court case, Skilling v. United States, citing the "honest services fraud" statute. Jeffrey Skilling, a former Enron executive, had argued that the honest-services fraud statute was unconstitutionally vague or, in the alternative, that Skilling's "conduct [did] not fall within the statute's compass.” In its decision, the Supreme Court limited the scope of the statute, holding that it did not criminalize undisclosed self-dealing or conflicts of interest. However, the Supreme Court also confirmed that bribery and kickback schemes were still criminalized under the statute. Williams seized upon that decision to file a motion challenging his conviction and sentence, arguing that the ruling, limiting the scope of the honest-services fraud statute, rendered his conviction invalid. The US District Court dismissed the motion, holding that the presented claim was procedurally defaulted. Williams then appealed to United States Eleventh Circuit Court of Appeals. The 11th Circuit agreed with the District Court, further ruling that Mr. Williams' convictions were convictions for bribery, which was not invalidated by the Skilling decision. In its decision on January 31, 2013, the 11th Circuit affirmed the District Court's denial of Williams' motion.

Williams was released from federal prison on July 20, 2014

=== Subsequent events ===
He is currently the Chief Marketing Officer of Hadwin Williams, consulting agency, as well as owner of The Walhalla Group, a property management company both in Johns Creek, Georgia. He belongs to a variety of community and civic organizations, including The Easter Seals, and also volunteers with organizations directly benefiting children.

== Personal life ==
Williams and his wife, Nui, currently reside in the Atlanta, GA metropolitan area.
