= Dean Alford =

American politician and businessman

- Born: Clarence Dean Alford; July 17, 1953 (age 73); Atlanta, Georgia
- Education: Georgia Institute of Technology
- Known for: President and CEO of Allied Energy Services, LLC; American politician and businessman convicted felon

Clarence Dean Alford (born July 17, 1953) is a former Republican Party member of the Georgia General Assembly, businessman, and convicted felon.

Alford was the president and chief executive officer of Allied Energy Services, LLC and spokesman for Power4Georgians, LLC, which company was originally organized by an employee of Allied Energy Services, LLC. Power4Georgians seeks to develop several Coal-fired power plants in Georgia, which plants have been found to cause hundreds of thousands of early deaths each year, mainly from air pollution, with efforts of Power4Georgians resulting in some members withdrawing because of the uncertainty over carbon emissions, resulting in possible corruption, resulting in an organizer of Power4Georgians being indicted for theft and racketeering, and resulting in an administrative law judge's ruling that environmental regulators had failed to properly review a proposed coal-fired power plant's plans that could affect water quality.

The State of Georgia arrested Alford on allegations he forged a state employee’s signature, committed racketeering, and filed fraudulent invoices to show account collectibles of $2,200,000 in taxpayer and other companies' funds for his company, Allied Energy Services, LLC., to sell the false collectibles at a discount to Versant, a collectibles purchaser.

Alford is also a defendant in two federal lawsuits, one by multiple investors accusing him of operating a Ponzi scheme, and one by creditors, while in July 2020, he agreed with the U.S. Securities and Exchange Commission to the entry of a consent judgment that he violated federal anti-fraud laws by running the Ponzi scheme.

== Early life and education ==
Alford graduated from Walker High School, which has since been renamed McNair High School, in DeKalb County in 1971. He then attended Georgia Tech, where he graduated with a Bachelor of Science in Electrical Engineering in 1976 and also served as the Chapter President of Beta Theta Pi (Gamma Eta Chapter).

== Business career ==
Alford founded A&C Enercom in 1978. He served as the president and CEO of Allied Energy Services, LLC from 2000-2019.

== Legislative career ==
From 1983 until 1993, Alford was a five-term member of the General Assembly in Georgia. Alford represented the 57th district, post 3, and served as chairman of the Energy Subcommittee, chairman of the Metropolitan Atlanta Rapid Transit Authority Oversight Committee, and as chairman of the DeKalb and Rockdale County Legislative Delegation.

== Other political experience ==
- Georgia Technology Authority: Alford was sworn in 1999 by Governor Roy Barnes as member of the Georgia Technology Authority (GTA) and served in this capacity until 2003. GTA is responsible for all aspects of technology procurement and policy for the State of Georgia.
- Georgia State Board of Education: Served as a member from September 2003 to December 2006.
- Governor's Education Finance Task Force: Appointed by Governor Sonny Perdue to chair the Governor's Education Finance Task Force. The Task Force has been charged with the task of developing a new funding formula for the K-12 system of Georgia.
- Department of Technical and Adult Education: Appointed by Governor Sonny Perdue to serve on the board of directors in January 2007.
- Member of the Georgia Board of Regents from 2012 until he resigned in 2019 amid a state investigation into allegations of racketeering, forgery of a state employee’s signatures and filing fraudulent invoices to show account collectibles of $2,200,000 in taxpayer and other companies' funds for his company, Allied Energy Services, LLC., to sell the false collectibles at a discount to Versant, a collectibles purchaser.

== Criminal Allegations and Civil Actions ==
It was reported by the Atlanta Journal-Constitution on October 3, 2019, that the Attorney General of Georgia and Georgia Bureau of Investigation issued arrest warrants for Alford on suspected racketeering and criminal attempt to commit theft by taking charges. It is alleged that Alford created fraudulent invoice acknowledgement forms, dated Sept. 24, to submit to Versant, a financial services company that buys accounts receivable at a discount, state officials said.

One document is alleged to have falsely asserted that the University of Georgia should pay Versant $487,982.88 to satisfy a debt owed to Alford’s own company, Allied Energy Services, LLC, located in Rockdale County. Alford allegedly forged a university employee’s signature on the document. Alford is alleged to have also perpetrated further receivables fraud involving Georgia Military College, Synovus and Inman Solar Inc. to obtain a total of about $2,200,000 for his Allied Energy Services company. Don Waters, chairman of the Georgia Board of Regents, related that “The allegations brought against Dean Alford, who resigned from the Board today, are shocking and deeply upsetting. We will continue assisting law enforcement in any capacity necessary throughout the investigation.”

Later in October 2019, approximately 40 investors filed a lawsuit against Alford in federal court in the Middle District of Georgia, alleging Alford took $6 million from them through a Ponzi scheme. This was followed in January 2020 with a lawsuit against Alford by three Virginia residents filed in federal court in the Northern District of Georgia accusing Alford of failing to repay a total of $160,000.

On July 30, 2020, the U.S. Securities and Exchange Commission announced charges against Alford relating to a Ponzi scheme. Alford is accused of "defrauding at least 100 investors in his now-bankrupt energy development company, Allied Energy Services LLC." Alford was accused of using money he raised to make interest payments to earlier investors and for personal expenses, such as building a multi-million dollar home. Alford agreed to entry of a consent judgment that he violated federal anti-fraud laws by running the Ponzi scheme.

In 2021, Chief Superior Court Judge Robert F. Mumford sentenced the Alford to 15 years. He was to serve 8 years in prison and would spend the remainder on probation, but Alford was released early in October 2025. As a condition of his probation, Alford may not conduct any business with the State.

== Personal life ==
Alford helped start the Miracle League, an organization that provides baseball fields for children with mental and physical disabilities, creating more than 240 baseball fields in the U.S. and Canada.
Alford’s third ex-wife, Debbie Dlugolenski Alford, the former head of the Georgia Lottery, filed for divorce in October 2019.
