= Leonard R. Meadows =

American politician

Member of the Georgia House of Representatives from the 91st district
- In office 1987–1992

Personal details
- Born: December 8, 1926 Meriwether County, Georgia, U.S.
- Died: April 10, 2006 (aged 79)
- Party: Democratic
- Spouse: Alexa Jo Corley
- Children: 5

Leonard R. Meadows (December 8, 1926 – April 10, 2006) was an American politician. He served as a Democratic member for the 91st district of the Georgia House of Representatives.

== Life and career ==
Meadows was born in Meriwether County, Georgia. He attended Manchester High School.

In 1987, Meadows was elected to represent the 91st district of the Georgia House of Representatives, serving until 1992.

Meadows died in April 2006, at the age of 79.
