= Lita McClinton =

American murder victim (1952–1987)

- Born: Lita LaVaughn; January 7, 1952
- Died: January 16, 1987 (aged 35); Atlanta, Georgia, U.S.
- Cause of death: Homicide by shooting
- Spouse: James Sullivan

Lita McClinton (née LaVaughn; January 7, 1952 – January 16, 1987) was an African-American socialite who was murdered the day her divorce was to be settled. She was the daughter of JoAnn McClinton, a member of the Georgia House of Representatives from 1993 to 2006, and Emory McClinton, an official in the United States Department of Transportation.

McClinton was shot dead while receiving a box of pink roses at her doorstep. In 1997, Phillip Anthony Harwood was identified as the hit man. He said he had committed the murder for $25,000 at the behest of her former husband, James Sullivan. Sullivan had been in Palm Beach, Florida during the shooting in Atlanta. Sullivan escaped arrest by fleeing abroad but, on July 2, 2002, he was arrested in Thailand. In 2004, he was extradited to Atlanta. In March 2006, Sullivan was convicted of murder for arranging the 1987 shooting of his wife. After the jury spared him from a death sentence, he was sentenced to life in prison without the possibility of parole. The case was profiled on Unsolved Mysteries in 2001, the year before Sullivan was arrested.

== Books ==
- Collins, Marion. The Palm Beach Murder. St. Martin's True Crime Library. ISBN 0-312-99086-3.
- Landau, Debra Miller (October 2004). "Social Disgraces". Atlanta Magazine.
- Marable, Marvin (October 30, 2010). Deadly Roses - The Twenty Year Curse. GCCI. ISBN 978-1-4392-5747-0.
- Miller Landau, Deb (August 6, 2024). A Devil Went Down to Georgia: Race, Power, Privilege, and the Murder of Lita McClinton. Pegasus Books. ISBN 978-16-39366-83-5.
