= Louise McBee =

American politician from Georgia (1924–2021)

Member of the Georgia House of Representatives from the 74th district
- In office January 13, 2003 – January 10, 2005
- Preceded by: Barbara Jean Bunn
- Succeeded by: Roberta Abdul-Salaam

Member of the Georgia House of Representatives from the 88th district
- In office January 11, 1993 – January 13, 2003
- Preceded by: George M. Brown
- Succeeded by: Billy Mitchell

Personal details
- Born: Mary Louise McBee; June 15, 1924 Strawberry Plains, Tennessee
- Died: March 2, 2021 (aged 96) Athens, Georgia
- Party: Democratic

Louise McBee (June 15, 1924 – March 2, 2021) was an American politician who served in the Georgia House of Representatives from 1993 to 2005.

She died on March 2, 2021, in Athens, Georgia, at age 96.
