= Tommy R. Smith =

American politician (1950–2026)

Tommy Ray Smith

Member of the Georgia House of Representatives
- In office 1978–2012

Personal details
- Born: December 15, 1950 Bacon County, Georgia, U.S.
- Died: October 15, 2026 (aged 75) Bacon County, Georgia, U.S.
- Party: Democratic (1978-2004); Republican (2004-)
- Education: Georgia Southern University

Tommy Ray Smith (December 15, 1950 – October 15, 2026) was an American farmer and politician. He served as a member of the Georgia House of Representatives. Elected as a Democrat, he switched parties in 2004.

== Life and career ==
Smith was born in Bacon County, Georgia in 1950 into a farming family, the son of James Jackson "Jack" Smith and Chloe Henriott Smith. He attended Georgia Southern University. He served in the Georgia House of Representatives from 1978 to 2012.

Smith died at his home near Alma, Georgia on October 15, 2026 at the age of 75.
