= Waymond C. Huggins =

American politician (1927–2016)

Waymond Cecil "Sonny" Huggins (September 3, 1927 – January 22, 2016) of LaFayette, Georgia, U.S., was a state politician and forest ranger in the state of Georgia.

Huggins served eight terms in the Georgia State Senate, where he represented the 53rd District. Huggins was a Democrat. He was elected for the first time in 1983 after a career as a forest ranger for the United States Forestry Service and the Georgia Forestry Commission.
