= Maretta Taylor =

American politician

Maretta Mitchell Taylor (January 25, 1935 – February 17, 2013) was an American educator and legislator.

Taylor graduated from William Henry Spencer High School in 1953. She received her bachelor's degree from Albany State College, Georgia in 1957 and her master's degree from Indiana University Bloomington. She was a teacher and librarian. Taylor served as a Democrat in the Georgia House of Representatives 1990–2002. She died in Columbus, Georgia.

She was a teacher and media specialist for 30 years, retiring from William Henry Spencer High School in 1987.
