= Frank I. Bailey Jr. =

American politician (born 1936)

Member of the Georgia House of Representatives
- In office 1972–1976; 1983–1990; 1993–2000

Personal details
- Born: August 3, 1936 (age 89) Augusta, Georgia, U.S.
- Party: Democratic

Frank Irving Bailey Jr. (born August 3, 1936) was an American politician. He was a member of the Georgia House of Representatives from 1972 to 1976, 1983 to 1990, and 1993 to 2000. He was a member of the Democratic party.
