= Bill Atkins (Georgia politician) =

American politician (1933–2024)

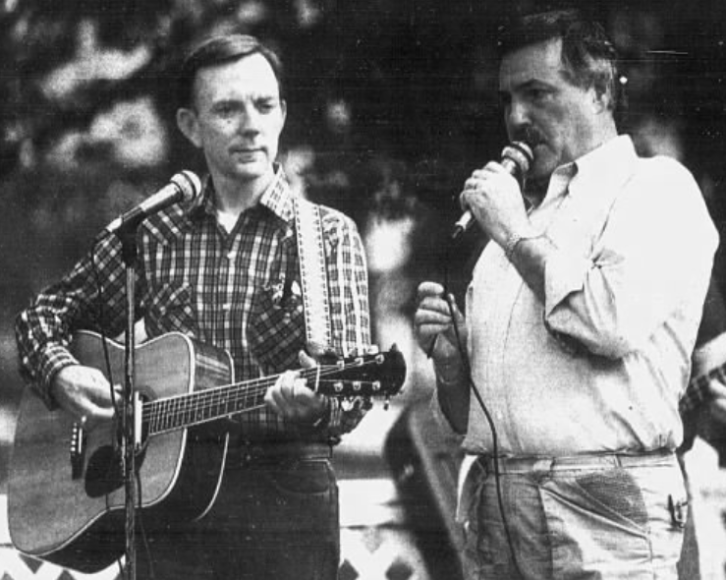
- Atkins (right) with Pat Head, 1987

Member of the Georgia House of Representatives
- In office 1983–1994

Personal details
- Born: August 16, 1933 Pickens County, Georgia, U.S.
- Died: June 30, 2024 (aged 90) Marietta, Georgia, U.S.
- Party: Republican
- Education: Mercer University

William A. Atkins (August 16, 1933 – June 30, 2024) was an American politician. He served as a Republican member of the Georgia House of Representatives.

== Life and career ==
Atkins was born in Pickens County, Georgia on August 16, 1933. He attended Mercer University and served in the United States Army. Atkins was a pharmacist. He served in the Georgia House of Representatives from 1983 to 1994. Atkins died in Marietta, Georgia on June 30, 2024, at the age of 90.
