= Bobby Lawson =

American politician

Member of the Georgia House of Representatives
- In office January 8, 1979 – January 9, 1995
- Preceded by: James Whitmire
- Succeeded by: Carl Rogers
- Constituency: 9th district (Note: From Post 2) (1979–1993); 20th district (1993–1995)

Personal details
- Born: Robert W. Lawson Jr. October 12, 1942 (age 83) Hall County, Georgia, U.S.
- Party: Democratic
- Spouse: Emily L. Dunlap
- Children: 2
- Education: University of Georgia

Robert W. Lawson Jr. (born October 12, 1942) is an American politician. He served as a Democratic member for the 9-2 district of the Georgia House of Representatives.

Born in Hall County, Georgia. Lawson attended the University of Georgia, where he earned his Bachelor of Arts degree in 1964 and Juris Doctor degree in 1967. After graduating, he served in the United States Air Force until 1969. Lawson had served as the assistant district attorney for the Northeast Circuit. In 1979, he won election in the 9-2 district of the Georgia House of Representatives, succeeding Doug Whitmore. He served until the 1990s.

In 2020, Lawson donated $100 to the campaign of Republican Matt Gurtler, who was running to represent Georgia's 9th congressional district.
