= Denmark Groover Jr. =

American politician

Member of the Georgia House of Representatives from the 99th district
- In office 1983–1995

Member of the Georgia House of Representatives from the 75th district
- In office 1973–1975

Member of the Georgia House of Representatives from the 27th district
- In office 1971–1973

Member of the Georgia House of Representatives from the Bibb County district
- In office 1963–1965

Member of the Georgia House of Representatives from the Bibb County district
- In office 1953–1957

Personal details
- Born: June 30, 1922 Quitman, Georgia, United States
- Died: April 18, 2001 (aged 78) Macon, Georgia, United States
- Party: Democratic

Denmark Groover Jr. (June 30, 1922 – April 18, 2001) was a Democratic American politician who served in the state of Georgia's House of Representatives.

== Early life ==
Groover was born in Quitman, Georgia, on June 30, 1922, to Mary Porter McCall and Denmark Groover Sr. He was educated in the public schools in Quitman. His father was a salesman who sold mules, insurance, and watermelons. During World War II, he was a United States Marine Corps aviator who flew with the so-called Black Sheep Squadron, which was commanded by Major Pappy Boyington.

== Political career ==
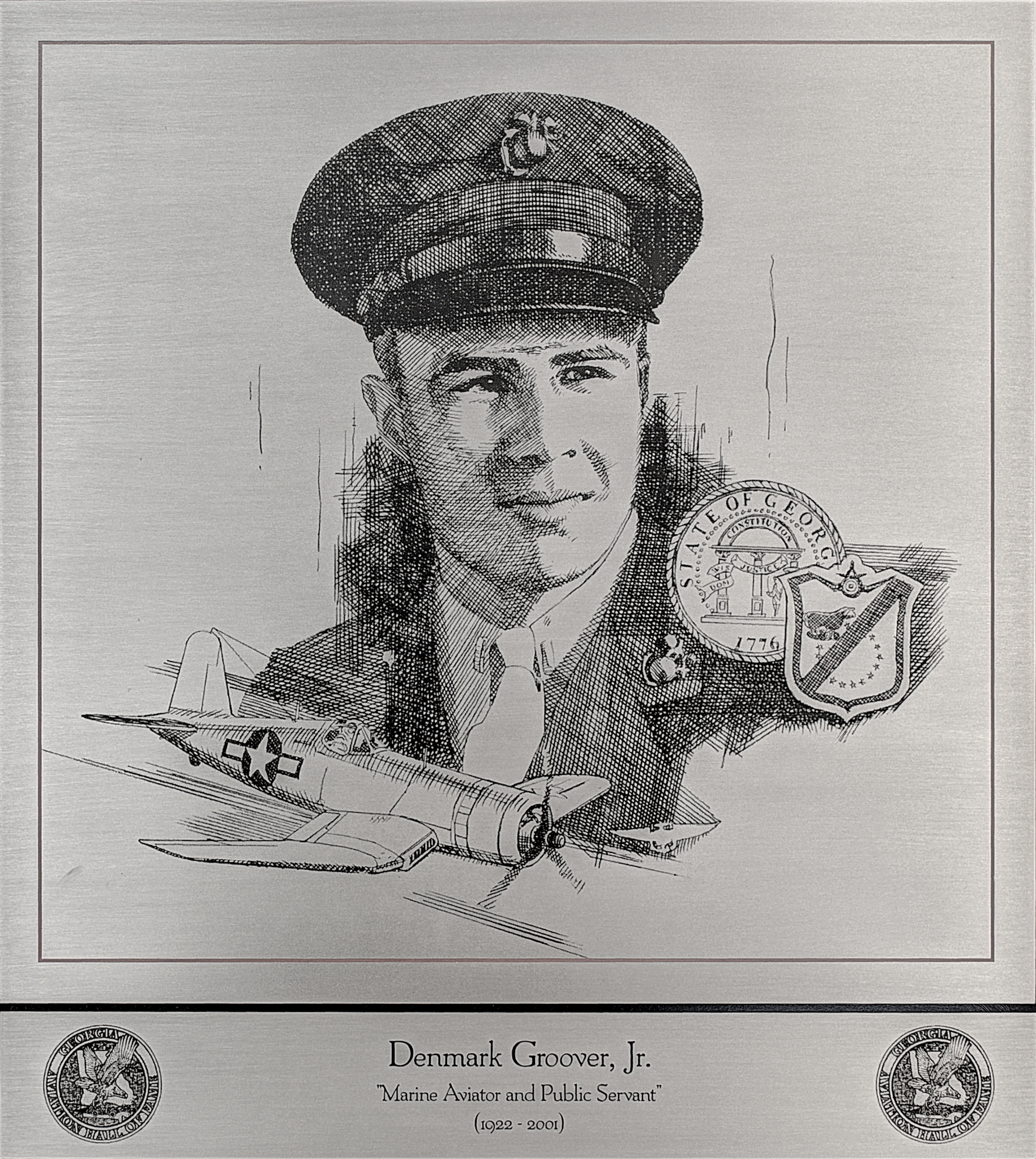
Plaque of Groover at the Georgia Aviation Hall of Fame

Groover graduated from the University of Georgia with a degree in law which helped him reach his political roles. He was a member of the Georgia House of Representatives from 1953–57, 1963–65, 1971–75, and 1983–95. He supported the 1956 change to the Georgia state flag but in 1993 he acknowledged it was offensive to some and worked for a compromise design. He became infamous when in 1964 during a congressional redistricting bill, he hung from a wall and tried to stop a clock before it signaled the formal end of a session. A photographer captured a photo of the incident, and the photo was printed throughout newspapers which made him an embarrassing icon for Georgia politics.

Groover also authored the 1964 law which moved Georgia elections from plurality to the two-round system, in response to the end of the county unit system and the feared rise of African-American voting power in the state. Later he admitted to federal investigators that this means to dilute Black voting power has been racially motivated and that he has been a segregationist.

He died in 2001 and was buried in Riverside Cemetery (Macon, Georgia). In 2002, Groover was posthumously inducted into the Georgia Aviation Hall of Fame.
