= Peg Blitch =

American politician (1934–2021)

Margaret Herold Blitch (July 28, 1934 – February 2, 2021) was an American politician.

Blitch was born in Passaic, New Jersey, to parents Francis Hyacinth Herold and Marian Alda Burrows on July 28, 1934. Her father later remarried, to Rose Anne. She married Brooks E. Blitch III, who was the son of Erwin and Iris Faircloth Blitch. In 1976, Peg Blitch was named a judge of the probate court in Clinch County, Georgia. She remained on the bench until 1980. Between 1990 and 1992, she served a single term on the Georgia House of Representatives, then was a member of the Georgia Senate until 2005, when she opted to retire from the state legislature. During her tenure on the Georgia General Assembly, Blitch lived in Homerville and was affiliated with the Democratic Party. She was elected mayor of Homerville in November 2009. Blitch died on February 2, 2021.
