= Nadine Thomas =

American politician (born 1952)

Member of the Georgia State Senate from the 10th district
- In office January 11, 1993 – January 10, 2005
- Preceded by: Harold Ragan
- Succeeded by: Emanuel Jones

Member of the Georgia House of Representatives from the 55th district
- In office January 14, 1991 – January 11, 1993
- Preceded by: Betty J. Clark

Personal details
- Born: May 14, 1952 (age 74) Fort Myers, Florida
- Party: Democratic

Nadine Thomas (born May 14, 1952) is an American politician who served in the Georgia House of Representatives from the 55th district from 1991 to 1993 and the first African American Female to serve in the Georgia State Senate from the 10th district from 1993 to 2005.
