= Carlton Colwell =

American politician (1926–2021)

Member of the Georgia House of Representatives
- In office January 11, 1965 – January 9, 1995
- Preceded by: William Thomas Meeks Jr.
- Succeeded by: Ben N. Whitaker
- Constituency: Union County (1965–1966); 5th district (1966–1973); 4th district (1973–1993); 7th district (1993–1995)

Personal details
- Born: Carlton Harry Colwell; June 27, 1926 Blairsville, Georgia, U.S.
- Died: August 9, 2021 (aged 95) Blairsville, Georgia, U.S.
- Party: Democratic
- Spouse: Odetta Ralston (m. 1948)
- Children: 6

Military service
- Allegiance: United States
- Branch/service: United States Army

Carlton Harry Colwell (June 27, 1926 – August 9, 2021) was an American politician in the state of Georgia. He served in the Georgia House of Representatives for 30 years, from 1965 to 1995.

== Early life and education ==
Colwell was born in Blairsville, Georgia, in a family with six sons. His father was a farmer.

In 1944, Colwell graduated from Union County High School. He began working as contractor in 1956, founding with his brothers the Colwell Construction Company, after working for General Motors.

== Political career ==
Colwell was elected to the Georgia House of Representatives as a Democrat from Union County in 1964. Halfway through his first term, the state redrew its legislative districts to equalize population in accordance with the Supreme Court's ruling in Reynolds v. Sims.

Colwell served continuously until his retirement from office in 1995. By his final term, he was the chair of the State Institutions & Property Committee, which has authority over Georgia's prison system.

== Death ==
Colwell died on August 9, 2021, at the age of 95.
