= Dick Lane (politician) =

American politician

Richard Gautier Lane (June 20, 1927 – October 31, 2015) was an American politician. He was born in Atlanta.

Lane served in the United States Navy during World War II. He then received his bachelor's degree in psychology from University of Georgia in 1951 and his law degrees from John Marshall Law School. Lane also went to Auburn University. He was the superintendent of the East Point, Georgia Parks and Recreation Department. Lane served in the Georgia House of Representatives from 1966 to 1994 and was a Republican. The Dick Lane Bridge over the Chattahoochee River on the Douglas–Fulton county line was named in his honor. The Dick Lane Velodrome, also named in his honor, was constructed in 1974 and inspired by a group of residents and City officials that visited the Munich Olympics. Located eight miles south of downtown Atlanta, the Dick Lane Velodrome is a 1/5 of a mile and 36° banked concrete track for bicycle racing, set in Sumner park in a residential part of beautiful historic East Point. Dick Lane is the only velodrome in the world with a green space that contains a large oak tree and a creek running through the in-field. The City of East Point owns the velodrome and has a long-term partnership with the EPVA to manage the Dick Lane Velodrome, and continue its use as one of the premier facilities of its kind.
