= Wayne Garner =

American politician

Member of the Georgia State Senate from the 30th district
- In office 1980–1994

Personal details
- Born: May 8, 1951 (age 75) Fulton County, Georgia, U.S.
- Party: Democratic
- Spouse: Jerri Denise Gray
- Children: 2
- Education: University of West Georgia

Wayne Garner (born May 8, 1951) is an American politician. He served as a Democratic member for the 30th district of the Georgia State Senate.

== Life and career ==
Garner was born in Fulton County, Georgia. He attended Douglas County High School and the University of West Georgia.

In 1980, Garner was elected to represent the 30th district of the Georgia State Senate, serving until 1994.
