= Loyce Turner =

American politician (1927–2021)

Member of the Georgia State Senate from the 8th district
- In office January 13, 1975 – January 11, 1999
- Preceded by: Robert A. Rowan
- Succeeded by: Tim Golden

Personal details
- Born: Loyce Warren Turner; December 2, 1927 Ashburn, Georgia, U.S.
- Died: April 16, 2021 (aged 93) Valdosta, Georgia, U.S.
- Party: Democratic
- Spouse(s): Carolyn Howell (m. 1956; died 2000) Ingrid Kiernan (m. 2006)
- Children: 2
- Education: Auburn University; University of Georgia

Loyce Warren Turner (December 2, 1927 – April 16, 2021) was an American politician in the state of Georgia.

Turner attended Auburn University and the University of Georgia. He served in the United States Army from 1951 to 1953 and was later a farmer and banker. He also worked as veterinarian from 1948 to 1976.

Turner served in the Georgia State Senate from 1975 to 1999, representing District 8 as a Democrat. His tenure also included a stint as majority whip of the Senate. After his senate term, Turner served on the Georgia Board of Natural Resources. He was the founder of the Annette Howell Turner Center for the Arts, in honor of his late wife.
