= Don Cheeks =

American politician (1931–2024)

Member of the Georgia Senate from the 23rd district
- In office 1992–2004
- Preceded by: Frank Albert
- Succeeded by: J.B. Powell

Member of the Georgia House of Representatives from the 89th district
- In office 1979–1992
- Preceded by: Bob Beckham
- Succeeded by: Keith G. Heard

Member of the Georgia House of Representatives from the 78th, Post 2 district
- In office 1971–1972
- Preceded by: Regnald Maxwell, Jr.
- Succeeded by: R. A. Dent

Member of the Georgia House of Representatives from the 104th, Post 2 district
- In office 1967–1968
- Preceded by: James Hull
- Succeeded by: Charles L. Carnes

Personal details
- Born: May 1, 1931 Richmond County, Georgia, U.S.
- Died: January 28, 2024 (aged 92)
- Party: Republican (Nov. 2002–2024)
- Other political affiliations: Democratic (?–Nov. 2002)

Donald Edward Cheeks (May 1, 1931 – January 28, 2024) was an American politician. He was a member of the Georgia State Senate from the 23rd district from 1992 to 2004. He was a member of the Republican party. Cheeks also served in the Georgia House of Representatives from 1967 to 1968 (District 104), 1971 to 1972 (District 78), and 1979 to 1992 (District 89).

Cheeks died January 28, 2024.
