= Terrell Starr =

American politician

Terrell A. Starr

Member of the Georgia Senate from the 44th district
- In office 1968–2007
- Preceded by: Kenneth Kilpatrick
- Succeeded by: Gail Davenport

Personal details
- Born: June 5, 1925
- Died: April 19, 2009 (aged 83)
- Party: Democratic
- Profession: Insurance Agent

Terrell Starr (June 5, 1925 – April 19, 2009) was a Democratic member of the Georgia State Senate from 1968 to 2007.

Born in Clayton County, Georgia, Starr was elected to the Georgia State Senate in 1968. He lived in Jonesboro, Georgia. Interstate 675 is named Terrell Starr Parkway in his honor.
