= Georgia's 33rd Senate district =

American legislative district

Georgia's 33rd State Senate district
Senator
Michael Rhett; D–Marietta
- Demographics: 34.14% White; 33.16% Black; 22.55% Hispanic; 4.42% Asian; 0.19% Native American; 0.06% Hawaiian/Pacific Islander; 1.26% Other; 5.52% Multiracial
- Population (2020) • Voting age: 192,766; 147,506

District 33 of the Georgia Senate is located entirely in Cobb County in northwestern Metro Atlanta.

The district includes parts of Fair Oaks, Marietta, and Powder Springs, as well as Dobbins Air Reserve Base. The district stretches from east to west across the county. The district includes the former city of Chattahoochee Plantation.

The current senator is Michael Rhett, a Democrat from Marietta first elected in 2014.
