= Harry D. Dixon =

American politician

Member of the Georgia House of Representatives
- In office September 27, 1962 – January 8, 2001
- Preceded by: Thomas A. Parker
- Succeeded by: Michael P. Boggs
- Constituency: Ware County (1962–1966); 83rd district (1966–1969); 65th district (1969–1973); 126th district (1973–1975); 151st district (1975–1993); 168th district (1993–2001)

Personal details
- Born: Harry Donival Dixon; March 24, 1925 Waycross, Georgia, U.S.
- Died: March 12, 2012 (aged 86) Waycross, Georgia, U.S.
- Party: Democratic

Harry Donival Dixon (March 24, 1925 – March 12, 2012) was an American politician in Waycross, Georgia. He was a member of the Georgia House of Representatives from 1962 to 2000. He was a member of the Democratic Party.

Dixon was born in Brantley County, Georgia, on March 24, 1925. He grew up in a railroad family and worked as a locomotive engine man on the Atlantic Coast Line. In 1943, he entered U.S. Maritime Service and served in World War II. He was discharged in 1946, and returned to Waycross, Georgia, and the railroad company. In 1952, he was promoted to engineer. In September 1962, he was elected as a Democrat to the Georgia House of Representatives, where he served for 38 years. He served as Chairman of Regulated Beverages for 27 years, and rewrote many of Georgia's liquor laws. Dixon served on the State Transportation Board of the Georgia Department of Transportation.

In December 2009, Bob Short of the Richard B. Russell Library for Political Research and Studies interviewed Mr. Dixon as part of its Reflections on Georgia Politics Oral History Collection.
