= Georgia's 31st Senate district =

Georgia's 31st State Senate district
Senator
Jason Anavitarte; R–Dallas
- Demographics: 65.20% White; 19.83% Black; 8.85% Hispanic; 1.07% Asian; 0.23% Native American; 0.06% Hawaiian/Pacific Islander; 0.58% Other; 5.67% Multiracial
- Population (2020) • Voting age: 192,560; 142,251

District 31 of the Georgia Senate is located in western Metro Atlanta and West Georgia.

The district includes most of Paulding County and all of Polk County.

The current senator is Jason Anavitarte, a Republican from Dallas first elected in 2020.
