= Johnny W. Floyd =

American politician (1938–2024)

Member of the Georgia House of Representatives
- In office 1989–2008
- Preceded by: Howard H. Rainey
- Succeeded by: Buddy Harden

Personal details
- Born: July 9, 1938 Jasper County, South Carolina, U.S.
- Died: September 28, 2024 (aged 86)
- Party: Democratic; Republican
- Education: University of Florida

Johnny Wilson Floyd (July 9, 1938 – September 28, 2024) was an American politician. He served as a member of the Georgia House of Representatives.

== Life and career ==
Floyd was born in Jasper County, South Carolina on July 9, 1938. He attended the University of Florida. Floyd served in the Georgia House of Representatives from 1989 to 2008. He died on September 28, 2024, at the age of 86.
