= Butch Parrish =

American politician from Georgia (born 1941)

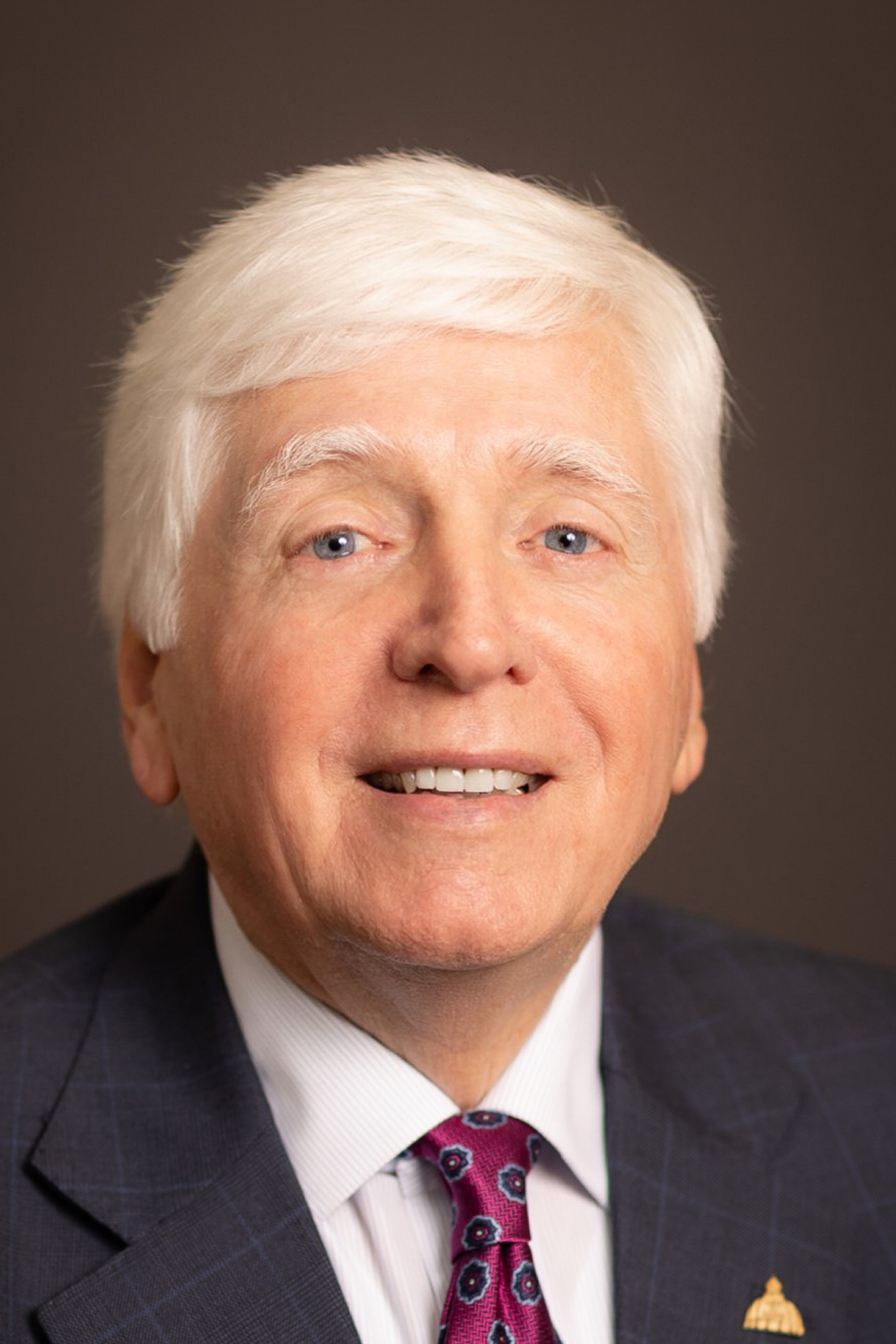
- Official headshot

Member of the Georgia House of Representatives
- Incumbent
- Assumed office January 14, 1985
- Preceded by: Randolph C. Karrh
- Constituency: 109th district (1985–1993); 144th district (1993–2003); 102nd district (2003–2005); 156th district (2005–2013); 158th district (2013–present)

Personal details
- Born: November 14, 1941 (age 84) Swainsboro, Georgia, U.S.
- Party: Republican (2006–present)
- Other political affiliations: Democratic (before 2006)
- Children: 3
- Education: University of Georgia (BS)

Larry J. Parrish (born November 14, 1941) is an American politician from Georgia. Parrish is a Republican member of the Georgia House of Representatives from the 158th District, serving since 1985.

== Career ==
Parrish is a businessman and a pharmacist. Parrish is the owner of Parrish Properties, a real estate holding company.

== Personal life ==
Parrish's first wife was Linda, they had 2 children together. His second wife was Charlotte, she has since died. He has since remarried to Carol Parrish. Parrish and his family live in Swainsboro, Georgia.

== Awards ==
Award nominations for Butch Parrish
Year	Nominee / work	Award	Result
	Butch Parrish	Pharmacist of the Year Award, Phi Delta Chi Pharmaceutical Fraternity, University of Georgia	Won
	Butch Parrish	Distinguished Alumni Award, University Of Georgia, College Of Pharmacy	Won
	Butch Parrish	Community Service Award, Wyeth Ayerst Pharmacy	Won
