= Newt Hudson =

American politician and educator

William Newton "Newt" Hudson (December 12, 1926 – August 12, 2014) was an American politician and educator.

Born in Ocilla, Georgia, Hudson served in the United States Navy during World War II. He then received his bachelor's degree from University of Georgia and taught agriculture. Hudson served in the Georgia House of Representatives as a Democrat in 1982 and served for twenty years. He died at his home in Rochelle, Georgia.
