= Doug Teper =

American politician

Douglas Clark Teper (born November 22, 1958) is an American politician and businessman from the US state of Georgia.

Teper was born in Atlanta, Georgia and graduated from the Georgia State University in 1982. He worked for a consulting company, in Atlanta, Georgia, and was the chief executive officer. From 1988 to 2004, Teper served in the Georgia House of Representatives and was a Democrat. Teper ran for Chief Executive Officer of DeKalb County Democratic Primary But Lost to Incumbent Chief Executive Officer Vernon Jones who went on To Win Unopposed
