= Dorothy Felton =

American politician and member of the Georgia House of Representatives

Member of the Georgia House of Representatives from the 43rd district
- In office 1975–2000
- Succeeded by: Joe Wilkinson

Personal details
- Born: Dorothy Jean Wood; March 1, 1929 Tulsa, Oklahoma
- Died: February 19, 2008 (aged 78)
- Party: Republican
- Spouse: Jethro Jerome Felton Jr. (m. 1953–2008)
- Children: Jethro Jerome III; Frank Bryan

Dorothy Felton (née Wood; March 1, 1929 – February 19, 2008) was an American politician who was the first Republican woman elected to the Georgia General Assembly. She was elected to represent District 43 in the Georgia House of Representatives in 1974, and continued to do so until retiring in 2000.

== Biography ==
Felton was born Dorothy Jean Wood in Tulsa, Oklahoma on March 1, 1929, to Ima Sue Chronister and George F. Wood. After graduating from the University of Arkansas in 1950 she worked as a journalist for the Tulsa Tribune. She married Jethro Jerome Felton Jr. in 1953, and they later moved to the Atlanta metro area. She was elected to the Georgia House of Representatives in 1974, serving thirteen terms before retiring after the 2000 legislative session. Her district, District 43, was in Sandy Springs, and during her time in the House she focused mainly on advocating for a referendum allowing residents of Sandy Springs to vote on whether the area should become an incorporated municipality. She died on February 19, 2008. The interchange between I-285 and Roswell Road in Sandy Springs is named in her honor.
