= Ralph Twiggs =

American politician from Georgia (1928–2003)

Member of the Georgia House of Representatives
- In office January 8, 1973 – September 17, 2003
- Preceded by: Jimmy Richard Jones
- Succeeded by: Charles F. Jenkins
- Constituency: 4th district (1973–1993); 8th district (1993–2003)

Personal details
- Born: Ralph Jennings Twiggs Jr. March 11, 1928 Hiawassee, Georgia, U.S.
- Died: September 17, 2003 (aged 75) Houston, Texas, U.S.
- Party: Democratic
- Spouse: Mary Buckner (m. 1971; died 1999)
- Children: 3

Military service
- Allegiance: United States
- Branch/service: United States Air Force
- Years of service: 1952

Ralph Jennings Twiggs Jr. (March 11, 1928 – September 17, 2003) was an American politician from Georgia. He served more than 30 years in the Georgia House of Representatives.

== Early life and education ==
Twiggs was born in Hiawassee, Georgia, in 1928. As a teenager, Twiggs befriended future Governor and Senator Zell Miller.

In 1951, he graduated from the Southern College of Pharmacy. After serving in the medical division of the United States Air Force in 1952, Twiggs began a career as a pharmacist.

== Political career ==
Twiggs was first elected to the Georgia House of Representatives in 1972. He would go on to win a total of sixteen terms in the chamber, amassing significant seniority. During his final term in office, Twiggs had risen to become chair of the Transportation Committee. He had also previously chaired the Public Safety Committee. A passionate advocate for public education, Twiggs championed Georgia's free kindergarten program.

== Death ==
Twiggs died of pneumonia in Houston on September 17, 2003, where he was receiving chemotherapy treatment for cancer.
