= Bob Holmes (politician) =

American politician

Member of the Georgia House of Representatives
- In office January 13, 1975 – January 12, 2009
- Succeeded by: Ralph Long
- Constituency: 39th district (1975–1983); 28th district (1983–1993); 53rd district (1993–2003); 48th district (2003–2005); 61st district (2005–2009)

Personal details
- Born: July 13, 1943 (age 83) Shepherdstown, West Virginia, U.S.
- Party: Democratic
- Spouse: Jean Patterson (m. 1963)
- Children: 3
- Education: Shepherd University (BS); Columbia University (MA, PhD)

Robert A. Holmes (born July 13, 1943) is an American attorney, academic, and politician who served as a member of the Georgia House of Representatives from 1975 to 2009.

== Education ==
Holmes earned Bachelor of Science degree in political science at Shepherd University in 1964, Master of Laws in public law and government from Columbia Law School, and a Ph.D. in political science at Columbia University.

== Career ==
Holmes served as a member of the Georgia House of Representatives from 1974 to 2008. In 2006, Holmes was re-elected as a Democrat to his seventeenth term, representing the 53rd district. He was a member of the Appropriations and Rules Committees and served as chairman of the Education Committee. Holmes served as chair of the Georgia Legislative Black Caucus in 1990 and 1991. He successfully sponsored or co-sponsored more than 200 laws that have been passed in the Georgia General Assembly.

Until his retirement in 2005, Holmes was director of the Southern Center for Studies in Public Policy and Distinguished Professor of Political Science at Clark Atlanta University.

== Distinctions ==
Holmes serves on the board of directors of the Capital City Bank and Trust, the JOMANDI Theater Company, the Sickle Cell Foundation, the Road Runners Club of America and the Metro-Atlanta YMCA.

Part of Interstate 285 was named in his honor, from Interstate 85 in South Fulton County to Interstate 20.

In 2001 he was awarded an honorary doctorate by Shepherd University.
