= John F. Godbee =

American politician

Member of the Georgia House of Representatives
- In office 1980–1997

Personal details
- Born: July 10, 1926 Sardis, Georgia, United States
- Died: February 27, 2014 (aged 87) Statesboro, Georgia, United States
- Party: Democratic

John Francis Godbee, Sr. (July 10, 1926 – February 27, 2014) was an American politician. He was a member of the Georgia House of Representatives from 1980 to 1997. He was a member of the Democratic party.
