= Vinson Wall =

American politician

Member of the Georgia House of Representatives from the 61st district
- In office 1973–1982
- Succeeded by: Rex A. Millsaps
- In office 1985–1990s
- Preceded by: Rex A. Millsaps

Member of the Georgia House of Representatives from the 82nd district
- In office 1990s–1996
- Succeeded by: Mike Coan

Personal details
- Born: October 17, 1947 (age 78) Clarke County, Georgia, U.S.
- Party: Republican
- Children: 1

Vinson Wall (born October 17, 1947) is an American politician. He served as a Republican member for the 61st and 82nd district of the Georgia House of Representatives.

== Life and career ==
Wall was born in Clarke County, Georgia and attended Gwinnett High School. He was a Air National Guard for six years.

In 1973, Wall was elected to represent the 61st district of the Georgia House of Representatives. In 1982, he left office to run for the Georgia State Senate but was unsuccessful. Two years later he was re-elected to the 61st district seat, succeeding Rex Millsap who had gained the seat after Wall left.

In response to an attorney general ruling that coroners cannot subpoena police or medical records triggered by the controversial investigation into the beating death of a teenager, Wall proposed a bill in 1986 to grant inquest powers to medical examiners and coroners along with bills related to the office of coroner.

In the 1990s, Wall was elected to represent the 82nd district. He served until 1996, when he was succeeded by Mike Coan.
