= Bill Lee (Georgia politician) =

American politician

Member of the Georgia House of Representatives
- In office January 14, 1957 – January 11, 1999
- Succeeded by: Ron Dodson
- Constituency: Clayton County (1957–1966); 35th district (1966–1969); 21st district (1969–1973); 68th district (1973–1975); 72nd district (1975–1993); 94th district (1993–1999)

Personal details
- Born: William J. Lee; December 15, 1925 Forest Park, Georgia, U.S.
- Died: October 30, 2014 (aged 88) Georgia, U.S.
- Party: Democratic

William J. Lee (December 15, 1925 – October 30, 2014) was an American politician. He served as a Democratic member of the Georgia House of Representatives from 1956 to 1999.
