= Georgia's 56th Senate district =

District 56 of the Georgia Senate currently encompasses portions of Fulton, Cobb and Cherokee counties.

== List of senators ==
| Member | Party | Years | Residence | Electoral history | Counties |
|---|---|---|---|---|---|
District created in 1969
| Jack Hardy | | 1969 – January 11, 1971 | | | |
| Haskew H. Brantley Jr. | | 1975–1987 | | | |
| Sallie Newbill | | January 12, 1987 – January 3, 1997 | | | |
| Tom Price | | January 3, 1997 – January 3, 2005 | | | |
| Dan Moody | | January 3, 2005 – January 10, 2011 | | | |
| John Albers | | January 10, 2011 – present | | | |
