= Georgia's 1st Senate district =

American legislative district

Coordinates: 31.9282020°N 81.3298640°W

Georgia's 1st State Senate district
Senator
Ben Watson; R–Isle of Hope
- Demographics: 58.9% White; 23.66% Black; 8.78% Hispanic; 2.64% Asian; 0.25% Native American; 0.3% Hawaiian/Pacific Islander; 0.48% Other; 6.56% Multiracial
- Population (2020) • Voting age: 191,402; 145,428

District 1 of the Georgia Senate is a senatorial district in Southeast Georgia encompassing most of Savannah's southern and eastern suburbs, as well as a sliver of Savannah itself.

The district includes all of Bryan and Liberty counties. The district also includes coastal and southwestern Chatham County, including Dutch Island, Georgetown, Henderson, Isle of Hope, Montgomery, Skidaway Island, Talahi Island, Tybee Island, Vernonburg, Whitemarsh Island, Wilmington Island, and parts of Bloomingdale, Pooler, and Savannah.

The current senator is Ben Watson, a Republican from Isle of Hope first elected in 2014.

== District officeholders ==
Years	Senator, District 1	Counties in district
1997–1999	Eric Johnson (R)	Bryan (part), Chatham (part)
1999–2001	Eric Johnson (R)	Bryan (part), Chatham (part)
2001–2003	Eric Johnson (R)	Bryan (part), Chatham (part)
2003–2005	Eric Johnson (R)	Brantley, Pierce, Bryan (part), Camden (part), Chatham (part), Glynn (part), Liberty (part), McIntosh (part)
2005–2007	Eric Johnson (R)	Bryan, Chatham (part), Liberty (part)
2007–2009	Eric Johnson (R)	Bryan, Chatham (part), Liberty (part)
2009–2011	Eric Johnson (R)	Bryan, Chatham (part), Liberty (part)
2009–2011	Buddy Carter (R)	Bryan, Chatham (part), Liberty (part)
2011–2013	Buddy Carter (R)	Bryan, Chatham (part), Liberty (part)
2013–2015	Buddy Carter (R)	Bryan, Chatham (part), Liberty (part)
2015–2017	Ben Watson (R)	Bryan, Chatham (part), Liberty (part)
2017–2019	Ben Watson (R)	Bryan, Chatham (part), Liberty (part)
2019–2021	Ben Watson (R)	Bryan, Chatham (part), Liberty (part)
2021–2023	Ben Watson (R)	Bryan, Chatham (part), Liberty (part)
2023–2025	Ben Watson (R)	Bryan, Chatham (part), Liberty
