= Jim Tysinger =

American politician

James Wesley Tysinger (August 9, 1921 – February 12, 2013) was an American engineer and politician.

Born in Greensboro, North Carolina, Tysinger served in the United States Army in the Pacific during World War II. He received his bachelor's and master's degrees from Georgia Institute of Technology and worked for Shell Oil and Westinghouse as an engineer. He served on the North Atlanta, Georgia city council. Tysinger served in the Georgia State Senate from 1968 to 1998 as a Republican, representing northern DeKalb County. Tysinger also founded the Senator Jim Tysinger Breakfast Forum, a weekly meeting hosted by the DeKalb County Republican Party.

He died in Brookhaven, Georgia.
