= 134th Georgia General Assembly =

←	133rd	135th	→
- Great Seal of the State of Georgia

Overview
- Legislative body: Georgia General Assembly
- Meeting place: Georgia State Capitol

Senate
- Members: 56
- President of the Senate: Zell Miller (D)
- Party control: Democratic Party

House of Representatives
- Members: 180
- Speaker of the House: Tom Murphy (D)
- Party control: Democratic Party

The 134th General Assembly of the U.S. state of Georgia convened its first session on January 10, 1977, at the Georgia State Capitol in Atlanta. The 134th Georgia General Assembly succeeded the 133rd and served as the precedent for the 135th General Assembly in 1979.

== Party standings ==
=== Senate ===
Affiliation	Members
Republican Party	4
Democratic Party	50
Total	56

=== House of Representatives ===
Affiliation	Members
Republican Party	23
Democratic Party	157
Total	180

^{*}Active political parties in Georgia are not limited to the Democratic and Republican parties. Occasionally, other parties run candidates in elections. Candidates may also run as an "independent". An elected official who has renounced party affiliation, will also be listed as an independent. For the 1977-78 session of the General Assembly, only the two major parties were successful in electing legislators to office.

== Officers ==
=== Senate ===
==== Presiding Officer ====
Position	Name	District	Party
President	Zell Miller	n/a	Democratic
President Pro Tempore	Al W. Holloway	12	Democratic

==== Majority leadership ====
Position	Name	District
Senate Majority Leader	John R. Riley	1
Majority Caucus Chairman	Render Hill	29
Majority Whip	Loyce Turner	08

==== Minority leadership ====
Position	Name	District
Senate Minority Leader	Paul D. Coverdell	40
Minority Caucus Chairman	James W. (Jim) Tysinger	41
Minority Whip	Robert H. Bell	05

=== House of Representatives ===
==== Presiding Officer ====
Position	Name	District	Party
Speaker of the House	Thomas B. Murphy	18	Democratic
Speaker Pro Tempore	Jack Connell	87	Democratic

==== Majority leadership ====
Position	Name	District
House Majority Leader	Clarence R. Vaughn Jr.	57
Majority Whip	Nathan Knight	67
Majority Caucus Chairman	Bill Lee	72
Majority Caucus Secretary	Ward Edwards	110

==== Minority leadership ====
Position	Name	District
House Minority Leader	Michael J. Egan	25
Minority Whip	Dick Lane	40
Minority Caucus Chairman	Bob Irvin	23
Minority Caucus Secretary	Kenneth Nix	20–3

== Members of the State Senate ==
District	Senator	Party	Residence
1	John R. Riley	Democratic	Savannah
2	Charles Henry Wessels	Democratic	Savannah
3	Mell Taylor	Democratic	Pembroke
4	Joseph E. Kennedy	Democratic	Claxton
5	Robert H. (Bob) Bell	Republican	Atlanta
6	Roscoe E. Dean, Jr.	Democratic	Jesup
7	Frank Eldridge Jr.	Democratic	Waycross
8	Loyce W. Turner	Democratic	Valdosta
9	Frank Sutton	Democratic	Norman Park
10	Henry P. Russell, Jr.	Democratic	Boston
11	Jimmy Hodge Timmons	Democratic	Blakely
12	Al Holloway	Democratic	Albany
13	James L. (Jimmy) Paulk	Democratic	Fitzgerald
14	Hugh A. Carter	Democratic	Plains
15	Floyd Hudgins	Democratic	Columbus
16	H. Norwood Pearce	Democratic	Columbus
17	Peter L. Banks	Democratic	Barnesville
18	Ed Barker	Democratic	Warner Robins
19	James Ronald "Ronnie" Walker	Democratic	McRae
20	Hugh Gillis	Democratic	Soperton
21	William F. English	Democratic	Swainsboro
22	Thomas F. Allgood	Democratic	Augusta
23	Jimmy Lester	Democratic	Augusta
24	Sam P. McGill	Democratic	Washington
25	Culver Kidd Jr.	Democratic	Milledgeville
26	Richard L. Greene	Democratic	Macon
27	Lee Robinson	Democratic	Macon
28	Virginia Shapard	Democratic	Griffin
29	Render Hill	Democratic	Greenville
30	J. Ebb Duncan	Democratic	Carrollton
31	Nathan D. Dean	Democratic	Rockmart
32	Joe Thompson	Democratic	Smyrna
33	Roy E. Barnes	Democratic	Mableton
34	Ed Johnson	Democratic	College Park
35	Perry J. Hudson	Democratic	Hapeville
36	Jack L. Stephens	Democratic	Atlanta
37	Todd Evans	Democratic	Atlanta
38	Horace E Tate	Democratic	Atlanta
39	Julian Bond	Democratic	Atlanta
40	Paul D. Coverdell	Republican	Atlanta
41	James W. (Jim) Tysinger	Republican	Atlanta
42	Pierre Howard	Democratic	Decatur
43	Thomas R. Scott	Democratic	Decatur
44	Terrell Starr	Democratic	Forest Park
45	W.D. (Don) Ballard	Democratic	Oxford
46	Paul C. Broun Sr.	Democratic	Athens
47	M. Parks Brown	Democratic	Hartwell
48	Steve Reynolds	Democratic	Lawrenceville
49	Howard T. Overby	Democratic	Gainesville
50	John C. Foster	Democratic	Cornelia
51	J. Beverly Langford	Democratic	Calhoun
52	Samuel W. Doss Jr.	Democratic	Rome
53	E.G. Summers	Democratic	LaFayette
54	W.W. (Bill) Fincher, Jr.	Democratic	Chatsworth
55	Lawrence (Bud) Stumbaugh	Democratic	Stone Mountain
56	Haskew H. Brantley, Jr.	Republican	Atlanta

== Members of the House of Representatives ==
District	Representative	Party	Residence
1-1	Wayne Snow Jr.	Democratic	Chickamauga
1-2	Forest Hays Jr.	Democratic	Chattanooga
2	Robert G. Peters	Democratic	Ringgold
3	Tom Ramsey	Democratic	Chatsworth
4-1	Carlton Colwell	Democratic	Blairsville
4-2	Ralph Twiggs	Democratic	Hiawassee
5	Jerry H. Money	Democratic	Summerville
6-1	Roger Williams	Democratic	Dalton
6-2	R. L. Foster	Democratic	Dalton
7	Ernest Ralston	Democratic	Calhoun
8-1	Joe Frank Harris	Democratic	Cartersville
8-2	Max R. Looper	Democratic	Dawsonville
8-3	Wendell T. Anderson	Democratic	Canton
9-1	Joe T. Wood	Democratic	Gainesville
9-2	James D. Whitmire	Democratic	Gainesville
9-3	Jerry D. Jackson	Democratic	Chestnut Mountain
10	Jack Irvin	Democratic	Baldwin
11	Bill Dover	Democratic	Hollywood
12	Lauren (Bubba) McDonald, Jr.	Democratic	Commerce
13-1	Louie Max Clark	Democratic	Danielsville
13-2	Billy Milford	Democratic	Hartwell
13-3	Charles C. Mann	Democratic	Elberton
14	Lucian K. Oldham	Democratic	Rome
15-1	E.M. (Buddy) Childers	Democratic	Rome
16	E.B. Toles	Democratic	Rome
17	Lynn Gammage	Democratic	Cedartown
18	Thomas B. Murphy	Democratic	Bremen
19-1	Joe Mack Wilson	Democratic	Marietta
19-2	Max D. Kaley	Democratic	Marietta
19-3	Bill Cooper	Democratic	Marietta
20-1	Johnny Isakson	Republican	Marietta
20-2	Carl Harrison	Republican	Marietta
20-3	Kenneth Nix	Republican	Smyrna
21-1	Eugene (Gene) Housley	Democratic	Marietta
21-2	A.L. (Al) Burruss	Democratic	Marietta
22	Mrs. Dorothy Felton	Republican	Atlanta
23	Bob Irvin	Republican	Roswell
24	Kiliaen V.R. (Kil) Townsend	Republican	Atlanta
25	Michael J. Egan	Republican	Atlanta
26	Sidney J. Marcus	Democratic	Atlanta
27	Michael C. Nichols	Democratic	Atlanta
28	Clinton E. Deveaux	Democratic	Atlanta
29	Douglas C. Dean	Democratic	Atlanta
30	Paul Bolster	Democratic	Atlanta
31	Mrs. Grace T. Hamilton	Democratic	Atlanta
32	Mildred Glover	Democratic	Atlanta
33	Julius C. Daugherty Sr.	Democratic	Atlanta
34	Lottie Heywood Watkins	Democratic	Atlanta
35	J.E. (Billy) McKinney	Democratic	Atlanta
36	G.D. Adams	Democratic	Hapeville
37	David Scott	Democratic	Atlanta
38	Mrs. Henrietta Mathis Canty	Democratic	Atlanta
39	Bob Holmes	Democratic	Atlanta
40	Dick Lane	Republican	East Point
41	Greg Pilewicz	Democratic	College Park
42	Virlyn B. Smith, Sr.	Republican	Fairburn
43-1	Charles L. Carnes	Democratic	Atlanta
43-2	Gerald Talmadge Horton	Democratic	Atlanta
43-3	John W. Greer	Democratic	Atlanta
44	John Linder	Republican	Dunwoody
45	George Williamson	Republican	Atlanta
46	Cathey W. Steinberg	Democratic	Atlanta
47	Joe Burton	Republican	Atlanta
48	Bill Noble	Republican	Atlanta
49	Ewell H. (Hank) Elliott, Jr.	Republican	Decatur
50	John Hawkins	Democratic	Atlanta
51	Mrs. Mobley (Peggy) Childs	Democratic	Decatur
52	Eleanor L. Richardson	Democratic	Decatur
53	Michael H. Lenderman	Democratic	Clarkston
54	Rev. Hosea L. Williams	Democratic	Atlanta
55	Betty J. Clark	Democratic	Atlanta
56-1	Don L. Butler	Republican	Decatur
56-2	Joe Johnston	Democratic	Decatur
56-3	Tommy Tolbert	Republican	Decatur
57	Clarence R. Vaughn Jr.	Democratic	Conyers
58	Cas M. Robinson	Democratic	Stone Mountain
59	R.T. (Tom) Phillips	Republican	Stone Mountain
60	B.B. Harris, Sr.	Democratic	Duluth
61	Vinson Wall	Democratic	Lawrenceville
62	Hugh Logan	Democratic	Athens
63	Bob Argo	Democratic	Athens
64	John D. Russell	Democratic	Winder
65	Thomas "Mac" Kilgore	Democratic	Douglasville
66-1	Gerald Johnson	Democratic	Carrollton
66-2	Tom Glanton	Democratic	Carrollton
67	Nathan G. Knight	Democratic	Newnan
68	J. Crawford Ware	Democratic	Hogansville
69	Edwin G. (Ed) Mullinax	Democratic	LaGrange
70	Claude A. Bray, Jr.	Democratic	Manchester
71-1	John R. Carlisle	Democratic	Griffin
71-2	John L. Mostiler	Democratic	Griffin
72-1	Wm. J. (Bill) Lee	Democratic	Forest Park
72-2	Jimmy W. Benefield	Democratic	Jonesboro
72-3	Jim Wood	Democratic	Forest Park
72-4	W. Rudolph Johnson	Democratic	Morrow
73	Ray Marks Tucker	Democratic	McDonough
74	Philip Johnson	Democratic	Covington
75	Bobby Carrell	Democratic	Monroe
76	Ben Barron Ross	Democratic	Lincolnton
77	Roy Owens	Democratic	Appling
78	Bill Jones	Democratic	Jackson
79	Marvin Adams	Democratic	Thomaston
80	P. Benson Ham	Democratic	Forsyth
81	W. Jones Lane	Democratic	Statesboro
82	Paul E. Nessith, Sr.	Democratic	Statesboro
83	Emory E. Bargeron	Democratic	Louisville
84	Warren D. Evans	Democratic	Thomson
85	R.A. Dent	Democratic	Augusta
86	Ronald C. Truluck	Republican	Hephzibah
87	Jack Connell	Democratic	Augusta
88	G.F. (Danny) Daniel, Jr.	Democratic	Augusta
89	Bob Beckham	Republican	Augusta
90	David J. Swann	Republican	Augusta
91	W. Randolph Phillips	Democratic	Shiloh
92	Calvin Smyre	Democratic	Columbus
93	Albert W. Thompson	Democratic	Columbus
94	Sanford D. Bishop, Jr.	Democratic	Columbus
95	Thomas B. Buck, III	Democratic	Columbus
96	Gary C. Cason	Republican	Columbus
97	Mary Jane Galer	Democratic	Columbus
98	Bryant Culpepper	Democratic	Fort Valley
99	Burl Davis	Democratic	Macon
100	Frank Pinkston	Democratic	Macon
101	William C. (Billy) Randall	Democratic	Macon
102	David E. Lucas	Democratic	Macon
103	Kenneth W. Birdsong	Democratic	Macon
104	Frank Horne	Democratic	Macon
105	Jimmy Lord	Democratic	Sandersville
106	Randolph C. (Randy) Karrh	Democratic	Swainsboro
107	A.D. Clifton	Democratic	Metter
108	Wilbur Edwin Baugh	Democratic	Milledgeville
109	Bobby Eugene Parham	Democratic	Milledgeville
110	Ward Edwards	Democratic	Butler
111	Donald G. Castleberry	Democratic	Richland
112	E. Roy Lambert	Democratic	Madison
113	Ted W. Waddle	Republican	Warner Robins
114	Roy H. (Sonny) Watson, Jr.	Democratic	Warner Robins
115	Larry Walker	Democratic	Perry
116	William Murray	Democratic	Americus
117	Ben Jessup	Democratic	Cochran
118	Terry L. Coleman	Democratic	Eastman
119	J. Roy Rowland	Democratic	Dublin
120	L.L. (Pete) Phillips	Democratic	Soperton
121	Dewey D. Rush	Democratic	Glennville
122	Arthur M. Gignilliat Jr.	Democratic	Savannah
123	Al Scott	Democratic	Savannah
124	Joseph A. (Joe) Battle	Democratic	Savannah
125	Tom Taggart	Democratic	Savannah
126	Herbert Jones, Jr.	Republican	Savannah
127	Bobby L. Hill	Democratic	Savannah
128	Tom Triplett	Democratic	Port Wentworth
129	George Chance	Democratic	Springfield
130	Bob Hanner	Democratic	Parrott
131	Charles Hatcher	Democratic	Albany
132	John White	Democratic	Albany
133	R.S. "Dick" Hutchinson	Democratic	Albany
134	T. Hayward McCollum	Democratic	Albany
135	Howard H. Rainey	Democratic	Cordele
136	Earleen Sizemore	Democratic	Sylvester
137	Ted Hudson	Democratic	Fitzgerald
138-1	R. Bayne Stone	Democratic	Hazlehurst
138-2	Joel R. Greene	Democratic	Jesup
139	René D. Kemp	Democratic	Hinesville
140	Ralph J. Balkcom	Democratic	Blakely
141	Walter E. Cox	Democratic	Bainbridge
142	Willis K. Long	Democratic	Cairo
143	James W. Keyton	Democratic	Thomasville
144	Marcus E. Collins, Sr.	Democratic	Pelham
145	Dorsey R. Matthews	Democratic	Moultrie
146-1	Grover C. Patten	Democratic	Adel
146-2	Monty Veazey	Democratic	Tifton
147	Henry L. Reaves	Democratic	Quitman
148	James M. Beck	Democratic	Valdosta
149	Robert L. Patten	Democratic	Lakeland
150	Tom Crosby, Jr.	Democratic	Waycross
151	Harry D. Dixon	Democratic	Waycross
152-1	Paul W. Foster	Democratic	Blackshear
152-2	Bobby A. Wheeler	Democratic	Alma
153	James R. (Jim) Tuten, Jr	Democratic	Brunswick
154	Dean G. Auten	Republican	Brunswick

== See also ==
- List of Georgia state legislatures
