= 137th Georgia General Assembly =

←	136th	138th	→
- Great Seal of the State of Georgia

Overview
- Legislative body: Georgia General Assembly
- Meeting place: Georgia State Capitol

Senate
- Members: 56
- President of the Senate: Zell Miller (D)
- Party control: Democratic Party

House of Representatives
- Members: 180
- Speaker of the House: Tom Murphy (D)
- Party control: Democratic Party

The 137th General Assembly of the U.S. state of Georgia convened its first session on January 10, 1983, at the Georgia State Capitol in Atlanta. The 137th Georgia General Assembly succeeded the 136th and served as the precedent for the 138th General Assembly in 1985.

== Party standings ==
=== Senate ===
Affiliation	Members
Republican Party	7
Democratic Party	49
Other party^{*}	0
Total	56

=== House of Representatives ===
Affiliation	Members
Republican Party	24
Democratic Party	156
Other party^{*}	0
Total	180

^{*}Active political parties in Georgia are not limited to the Democratic and Republican parties. Libertarians, and occasionally others, run candidates in elections. However, for the 1983-84 session of the General Assembly, only the two major parties were successful in electing legislators to office.

== Officers ==
=== Senate ===
==== Presiding Officer ====
Position	Name	District	Party
President	Zell Miller	n/a	Democratic
President Pro Tempore	Joseph E. Kennedy	04	Democratic

==== Majority leadership ====
Position	Name	District
Senate Majority Leader	Thomas F. Allgood	22
Majority Caucus Chairman	Render Hill	29
Majority Whip	William F. English	21

==== Minority leadership ====
Position	Name	District
Senate Minority Leader	Paul D. Coverdell	40
Minority Caucus Chairman	James W. (Jim) Tysinger	41
Minority Whip	Haskew H. Brantley, Jr.	56

=== House of Representatives ===
==== Presiding Officer ====
Position	Name	District	Party
Speaker of the House	Thomas B. Murphy	18	Democratic
Speaker Pro Tempore	Jack Connell	87	Democratic

==== Majority leadership ====
Position	Name	District
House Majority Leader	Al Burruss	20-2
Majority Whip	John D. Russell	64
Majority Caucus Chairman	Bill Lee	72
Majority Caucus Secretary	Ward Edwards	112

==== Minority leadership ====
Position	Name	District
House Minority Leader	Johnny Isakson	21-2
Minority Whip	Luther Colbert	23
Minority Caucus Chairman	Dean G. Auten	156
Minority Caucus Secretary	Betty Jo Williams	48

== Members of the State Senate ==
District	Senator	Party	Residence
1	J. Tom Coleman	Democratic	Savannah
2	Albert (Al) Scott	Democratic	Savannah
3	Glenn E. Bryant	Democratic	Hinesville
4	Joseph E. Kennedy	Democratic	Claxton
5	Joe Burton	Republican	Atlanta
6	Richard W. Littlefield	Democratic	Brunswick
7	Ed Perry	Democratic	Nashville
8	Loyce W. Turner	Democratic	Valdosta
9	R.T. (Tom) Phillips	Republican	Lilburn
10	Paul Trulock	Democratic	Climax
11	Jimmy Hodge Timmons	Democratic	Blakely
12	Al Holloway	Democratic	Albany
13	Rooney L. Bowen	Democratic	Cordele
14	Lewis H. (Bud) McKenzie	Democratic	Montezuma
15	Floyd Hudgins	Democratic	Columbus
16	Ted J. Land	Republican	Columbus
17	Janice S. Horton	Democratic	McDonough
18	Ed Barker	Democratic	Warner Robins
19	James Ronald Walker	Democratic	McRae
20	Hugh M. Gillis, Sr.	Democratic	Soperton
21	William F. English	Democratic	Swainsboro
22	Thomas F. Allgood	Democratic	Augusta
23	Jimmy Lester	Democratic	Augusta
24	Sam P. McGill	Democratic	Washington
25	Culver Kidd Jr.	Democratic	Milledgeville
26	Richard L. Greene	Democratic	Macon
27	W.F. (Billy) Harris	Democratic	Thomaston
28	Kyle Cobb	Democratic	Griffin
29	J. Render Hill	Democratic	Greenville
30	Wayne Garner	Democratic	Carrollton
31	Nathan Dean	Democratic	Rockmart
32	Joe Thompson	Democratic	Smyrna
33	Roy E. Barnes	Democratic	Mableton
34	Bev Engram	Democratic	Fairburn
35	Frank E. Coggin	Democratic	Hapeville
36	David Scott	Democratic	Atlanta
37	Carl Harrison	Republican	Marietta
38	Horace E Tate	Democratic	Atlanta
39	Julian Bond	Democratic	Atlanta
40	Paul D. Coverdell	Republican	Atlanta
41	James W. (Jim) Tysinger	Republican	Atlanta
42	Pierre Howard	Democratic	Decatur
43	Thomas R. Scott	Democratic	Decatur
44	Terrell Starr	Democratic	Forest Park
45	Harrill L. Dawkins	Democratic	Conyers
46	Paul C. Broun	Democratic	Athens
47	M. Parks Brown	Democratic	Hartwell
48	Donn M. Peevy	Democratic	Lawrenceville
49	J. Nathan Deal	Democratic	Gainesville
50	John C. Foster	Democratic	Cornelia
51	Max Brannon	Democratic	Calhoun
52	Edward Hine, Jr.	Democratic	Rome
53	Waymond C. Huggins	Democratic	LaFayette
54	W.W. (Bill) Fincher, Jr.	Democratic	Chatsworth
55	Lawrence (Bud) Stumbaugh	Democratic	Stone Mountain
56	Haskew H. Brantley, Jr.	Republican	Alpharetta

== Members of the House of Representatives ==
District	Representative	Party	Residence
1-1	Wayne Snow Jr.	Democratic	Rossville
1-2	Forest Hays Jr.	Democratic	Flintstone
2	Robert Peters	Democratic	Ringgold
3	Tom Ramsey	Democratic	Chatsworth
4-1	Carlton Colwell	Democratic	Blairsville
4-2	Ralph Twiggs	Democratic	Hiawassee
5	John G. Crawford	Democratic	Lyerly
6-1	Roger Williams	Democratic	Dalton
6-2	Phil Foster	Democratic	Dalton
7	J. C. Maddox	Democratic	Calhoun
8-1	Wendell T. Anderson	Democratic	Canton
8-2	Bill Hasty	Democratic	Canton
9-1	Joe T. Wood	Democratic	Gainesville
9-2	Bobby Lawson	Democratic	Gainesville
9-3	Jerry D. Jackson	Democratic	Chestnut Mountain
10	Bill H. Barnett	Democratic	Cumming
11-1	William J. Dover	Democratic	Clarkesville
11-2	Jack Irvin, Sr.	Democratic	Baldwin
12	Lauren (Bubba) McDonald	Democratic	Commerce
13-1	Louie Max Clark	Democratic	Danielsville
13-2	Billy Milford	Democratic	Hartwell
14	Charles W. Yeargin	Democratic	Elberton
15-1	Buddy Childers	Democratic	Rome
15-2	Forrest L. McKelvey	Democratic	Silver Creek
16	John Adams	Democratic	Rome
17	Bill Cumming	Democratic	Rockmart
18	Tom Murphy	Democratic	Bremen
19	Boyd Petit	Democratic	Cartersville
20-1	Joe Mack Wilson	Democratic	Marietta
20-2	A.L. (Al) Burruss	Democratic	Marietta
20-3	George W. (Buddy) Darden	Democratic	Marietta
20-4	Steve Thompson	Democratic	Powder Springs
20-5	Terry D. Lawler	Democratic	Clarkdale
21-1	Fred Aiken	Republican	Smyrna
21-2	Johnny Isakson	Republican	Marietta
21-3	Bill Atkins	Republican	Smyrna
21-4	Frank B. Johnson	Republican	Smyrna
21-5	Tom Wilder	Republican	Marietta
22	Dorothy Felton	Republican	Atlanta
23	Luther S. Colbert	Republican	Roswell
24	Kiliaen V.R. (Kil) Townsend	Republican	Atlanta
25	John M. Lupton, III	Republican	Atlanta
26	Sidney J. Marcus	Democratic	Atlanta
27	Dick Lane	Republican	East Point
28	Bob Holmes	Democratic	Atlanta
29	Douglas C. Dean	Democratic	Atlanta
30	Paul Bolster	Democratic	Atlanta
31	Mrs. Grace T. Hamilton	Democratic	Atlanta
32	Helen Selman	Democratic	Palmetto
33	Julius C. Daugherty Sr.	Democratic	Atlanta
34	Tyrone Brooks	Democratic	Atlanta
35	J.E. (Billy) McKinney	Democratic	Atlanta
36	G.D. Adams	Democratic	Hapeville
37	Georganna T. Sinkfield	Democratic	Atlanta
38	Lorenzo Benn	Democratic	Atlanta
39	John W. Greer	Democratic	Atlanta
40	Barbara H. Couch	Democratic	Atlanta
41	Charlie Watts	Democratic	Dallas
42	Thomas M. Kilgore	Democratic	Douglasville
43	Paul W. Heard, Jr.	Republican	Peachtree City
44	John Linder	Republican	Dunwoody
45	Jerry Max Davis	Republican	Atlanta
46	Cathey W. Steinberg	Democratic	Atlanta
47	Chesley V. Morton	Republican	Tucker
48	Betty Jo Williams	Republican	Atlanta
49	Tom Lawrence	Republican	Stone Mountain
50	Frank L. Redding, Jr.	Democratic	Decatur
51	Kenneth W. Workman	Democratic	Decatur
52	Eleanor L. Richardson	Democratic	Decatur
53	Mrs. Mobley (Peggy) Childs	Democratic	Decatur
54	Hosea L. Williams, Sr.	Democratic	Atlanta
55	Betty J. Clark	Democratic	Atlanta
56	Betty Aaron	Democratic	Atlanta
57-1	Troy A. Athon	Democratic	Conyers
57-2	William C. Mangum Jr.	Democratic	Decatur
57-3	Dean Alford	Democratic	Lithonia
58	Cas Robinson	Democratic	Stone Mountain
59	O.M. (Mike) Barnett	Republican	Lilburn
60	Charles C. Martin	Democratic	Buford
61	Rex A. Millsaps	Democratic	Lawrenceville
62	Thomas Hulet (Tom) White	Republican	Lilburn
63	Bill Goodwin	Republican	Norcross
64	John D. Russell	Democratic	Winder
65	Neal Jackson	Democratic	Monroe
66	E. Roy Lambert	Democratic	Madison
67	Hugh Logan	Democratic	Athens
68	Bob Argo	Democratic	Athens
69	Charles Thomas	Democratic	Temple
70	Gerald Johnson	Democratic	Carrollton
71	J. Neal Shepard, Jr.	Republican	Newnan
72-1	Bill Lee	Democratic	Forest Park
72-2	Jimmy W. Benefield	Democratic	Jonesboro
72-3	C.E. (Ed Holcomb)	Democratic	Jonesboro
72-4	W. Rudolph Johnson	Democratic	Lake City
72-5	Frank I. Bailey, Jr.	Democratic	Riverdale
73	Wesley Dunn	Democratic	McDonough
74	Denny M. Dobbs	Democratic	Covington
75	John L. Mostiler	Democratic	Griffin
76	Suzi Johnson	Democratic	Orchard Hill
77	J. Crawford Ware	Democratic	Hogansville
78	Bill Jones	Democratic	Jackson
79	Marvin Adams	Democratic	Thomaston
80	Kenneth Waldrep	Democratic	Forsyth
81	Ed Mullinax	Democratic	LaGrange
82	Ben Barron Ross	Democratic	Lincolnton
83	William S. (Bill) Jackson	Democratic	Martinez
84	Warren D. Evans	Democratic	Thomson
85	Charles W. Walker	Democratic	Augusta
86	Mike Padgett	Democratic	Augusta
87	Jack Connell	Democratic	Augusta
88	George M. Brown	Democratic	Augusta
89	Don Cheeks	Democrat	Augusta
90	Travis Stanley Barnes	Democratic	Augusta
91	Claude A. Bray, Jr.	Democratic	Manchester
92	Calvin Smyre	Democratic	Columbus
93	W. Randolph Phillips	Democratic	Shiloh
94	Sanford D. Bishop, Jr.	Democratic	Columbus
95	Thomas B. Buck	Democratic	Columbus
96	Milton Hirsch	Democratic	Columbus
97	Mary Jane Galer	Democratic	Columbus
98	Robert F. Ray	Democratic	Fort Valley
99	Denmark Groover, Jr.	Democratic	Macon
100	Frank C. Pinkston	Democratic	Macon
101	William C. (Billy) Randall	Democratic	Macon
102	David E. Lucas	Democratic	Macon
103	Frank Horne, Jr.	Democratic	Macon
104	Kenneth (Ken) W. Birdsong	Democratic	Gordon
105	Bobby Eugene Parham	Democratic	Milledgeville
106	Jesse Copelan, Jr.	Democratic	Eatonton
107	Jimmy Lord	Democratic	Sandersville
108	Emory E. Bargeron	Democratic	Louisville
109	Randolph C. (Randy) Karrh	Democratic	Swainsboro
110	John F. Godbee	Democratic	Brooklet
111	Bob Lane	Democratic	Statesboro
112	Ward Edwards	Democratic	Butler
113	Ted W. Waddle	Republican	Warner Robins
114	Roy H. (Sonny) Watson, Jr.	Democratic	Warner Robins
115	Larry Walker	Democratic	Perry
116	George Hooks	Democratic	Americus
117	Newt Hudson	Democratic	Rochelle
118	Terry L. Coleman	Democratic	Eastman
119	DuBose Porter	Democratic	Dublin
120	L.L. (Pete) Phillips	Democratic	Soperton
121	Clinton Oliver	Democratic	Glennville
122	Ron Ginsberg	Democratic	Savannah
123	Diane Harvey Johnson	Democratic	Savannah
124	DeWayne Hamilton	Democratic	Savannah
125	Bobby Phillips	Democratic	Savannah
126	Anne Mueller	Republican	Savannah
127	Roy L. Allen	Democratic	Savannah
128	Tom Triplett	Democratic	Savannah
129	George A. Chance, Jr.	Democratic	Springfield
130	Gerald E. Greene	Democratic	Cuthbert
131	Bob Hanner	Democratic	Dawson
132	John White	Democratic	Albany
133	Tommy Chambless	Democratic	Albany
134	Mary Young-Cummings	Democratic	Albany
135	Howard H. Rainey	Democratic	Cordele
136	Earleen Sizemore	Democratic	Sylvester
137	Paul S. Branch, Jr.	Democratic	Fitzgerald
138	Hentry Bostic	Democratic	Tifton
139	James C. Moore	Democratic	West Green
140	Ralph J. Balkcom	Democratic	Blakely
141	Walter E. Cox	Democratic	Bainbridge
142	Willis K. Long	Democratic	Cairo
143	Allen Sherrod	Democratic	Coolidge
144	Marcus E. Collins, Sr.	Democratic	Pelham
145	Hugh D. Matthews	Democratic	Moultrie
146	Hanson Carter	Democratic	Nashville
147	Henry L. Reaves	Democratic	Quitman
148	James M. Beck	Democratic	Valdosta
149	Robert L. Patten	Democratic	Lakeland
150	Tom Crosby, Jr.	Democratic	Waycross
151	Harry D. Dixon	Democratic	Waycross
152	Tommy R. Smith	Democratic	Alma
153-1	Lunsford Moody	Democratic	Baxley
153-2	Roger C. Byrd	Democratic	Hazlehurst
154	Joe E. Brown	Democratic	Hinesville
155	Norman "Shaw" McVeigh	Republican	Brunswick
156	Dean G. Auten	Republican	Brunswick

== See also ==
- List of Georgia state legislatures
