= Veazey =

Veazey may refer to:

- Carlton W. Veazey is a minister in the National Baptist Convention (USA).
- George Veazey Strong (1880–1946) was a U.S. Army general who served as Chief of Army Intelligence during World War II.
- Monty Veazey (born 1954), American politician
- Stephen M. Veazey (born 1957) is the current president of the Community of Christ.
- Thomas Veazey (1774–1842) was a Maryland politician who served in a variety of roles.
- Vance Veazey (born 1965) is an American professional golfer.
