= Don Butler =

Don Butler may refer to:

- Don Butler (tennis) (1910–?), British tennis player
- Don L. Butler (1927–2016), American politician, member of the Georgia House of Representatives
- Don Butler (West Wing)
- Don Butler, singer with American gospel male voice trio Sons of Song

== See also ==
- Donald Butler (born 1988), American football player
