= Doug Whitmore =

Doug Whitmore may refer to:

- Doug Whitmore, character in 50 First Dates
- Doug Whitmore (politician) in 134th Georgia General Assembly
