= Truluck =

Truluck is a surname. Notable people with the surname include:

- Ashley Truluck, British soldier and administrator
- Bob Truluck (born 1949), American novelist
- R-Kal Truluck (1974–2019), American football player
- Rembert S. Truluck (1934–2008), American gay theologian, preacher, and writer
- Ronald C. Truluck (born 1942), American politician
