= Lenderman =

Lenderman is a surname. Notable people with the surname include:

- Aleksandr Lenderman (born 1989), American chess grandmaster
- Homer Lenderman (born 1956), American politician
- Laura Lenderman (fl. 1993–present), American air force general
- Michael H. Lenderman (1945–2022), American politician
- MJ Lenderman (born 1999), American musician
