= Clinton E. Deveaux =

American politician

Member of the Georgia House of Representatives
- In office 1977–1978

Personal details
- Born: May 31, 1946 (age 80) New York, U.S.
- Party: Democratic
- Education: University at Buffalo; Emory University School of Law

Clinton E. Deveaux (born May 31, 1946) is an American politician. A member of the Democratic Party, he served in the Georgia House of Representatives from 1977 to 1978.

== Life and career ==
Deveaux was born in New York, the son of Clinton Harold Deveaux and Bloneva Louise Fawkes. He attended the University at Buffalo, earning his BA degree in 1967. He also attended Emory University School of Law, earning his JD degree in 1975. He was an attorney.

Deveaux served in the Georgia House of Representatives from 1977 to 1978.
