= Gerald Talmadge Horton =

American politician

Gerald Talmadge Horton (July 5, 1934 – October 29, 2008) was a Georgia (U.S.) legislator from Atlanta's 43rd district who served in the Georgia House of Representatives from 1968 until 1979. He was born in Tupelo, Mississippi. He was a graduate of Harvard College in 1956. Horton died in Jacksonville, Florida.
