= Michael H. Lenderman =

American politician

Mike Lenderman

Member of the Georgia House of Representatives from the 53rd district
- In office January 10, 1977 – January 8, 1979
- Preceded by: Walter B. Russell Jr.
- Succeeded by: Doug Vandiford

Personal details
- Born: Michael Hugh Lenderman; July 30, 1945 Gainesville, Georgia, U.S.
- Died: July 13, 2022 (aged 76)
- Party: Democratic
- Spouse: Virginia Lee Sikes (m. 1971)
- Education: Georgia State University

Military service
- Allegiance: United States
- Branch/service: United States Army
- Years of service: 1967–1969
- Rank: First lieutenant
- Awards: Good Conduct Medal

Michael Hugh Lenderman (July 30, 1945 – July 13, 2022) was an American politician. He served as a Democratic member of the Georgia House of Representatives.

== Life and career ==
Lenderman was born in Gainesville, the county seat of Hall County, Georgia. He attended Georgia State University and served in the United States Army.

Lenderman served in the Georgia House of Representatives during the 134th Georgia General Assembly, which ran from 1977 to 1979.

Lenderman died on July 13, 2022, at the age of 76.
