= Bobby A. Wheeler =

American politician

Member of the Georgia House of Representatives
- In office 1969–1978

Personal details
- Born: September 7, 1933 Bacon County, Georgia, U.S.
- Died: July 23, 2007 (aged 73)
- Party: Democratic
- Education: University of Georgia

Bobby A. Wheeler (September 7, 1933 – July 23, 2007) was an American politician. He served as a Democratic member of the Georgia House of Representatives.

== Life and career ==
Wheeler was born in Bacon County, Georgia. He attended the University of Georgia.

Wheeler served in the Georgia House of Representatives from 1969 to 1978.

Wheeler died on July 23, 2007, at the age of 73.
