= James D. Whitmire =

American politician (1935–2022)

Member of the Georgia House of Representatives
- In office 1971–1978

Personal details
- Born: June 2, 1935 Forsyth County, Georgia, U.S.
- Died: July 29, 2022 (aged 87)
- Party: Democratic

James D. Whitmire (June 2, 1935 – July 29, 2022) was an American politician. He served as a Democratic member of the Georgia House of Representatives.

== Life and career ==
Whitmire was born in Forsyth County, Georgia. He attended Chestatee School and Lyman Hall School.

Whitmire served in the Georgia House of Representatives from 1971 to 1978.

Whitmire died on July 29, 2022, at the age of 87.
