= USS Page County =

1945 LST-542-class tank landing ship

- USS Page County (LST-1076) underway, date and place unknown

History

United States
- Name: USS LST-1076
- Builder: Bethlehem Hingham Shipyard, Hingham, Massachusetts
- Laid down: 16 March 1945
- Launched: 14 April 1945
- Commissioned: 1 May 1945
- Decommissioned: 13 June 1946
- Renamed: USS Page County (LST-1076), 1 July 1955
- Recommissioned: 28 November 1960
- Decommissioned: 5 March 1971
- Stricken: 15 April 1978
- Honors and awards: 5 campaign stars (Vietnam)
- Fate: Transferred to Greece, 1971; Sold outright, 1 July 1978
- Stricken: 15 April 1978

Greece
- Name: Kriti
- Acquired: 1971
- Identification: L171
- Fate: Unknown

General characteristics
- Class & type: LST-542-class tank landing ship
- Displacement: 1,625 long tons (1,651 t) light; 4,080 long tons (4,145 t) full
- Length: 328 ft (100 m)
- Beam: 50 ft (15 m)
- Draft: Unloaded : 2 ft 4 in (0.71 m) forward; 7 ft 6 in (2.29 m) aft; Loaded : 8 ft 2 in (2.49 m) forward; 14 ft 1 in (4.29 m) aft
- Propulsion: 2 × General Motors 12-567 diesel engines, two shafts, twin rudders
- Speed: 12 knots (22 km/h; 14 mph)
- Boats & landing craft carried: 2 × LCVPs
- Troops: 16 officers, 147 enlisted men
- Complement: 7 officers, 104 enlisted men
- Armament: 8 × 40 mm guns; 12 × 20 mm guns

USS Page County (LST-1076) was a LST-542-class tank landing ship built for the United States Navy during World War II. Named for counties in Iowa and Virginia, she was the only U.S. Naval vessel to bear the name. Initially known only as LST-1076, the ship was deactivated following the war. Renamed Page County in 1955, the ship was reactivated in 1960 and saw service during the Vietnam War. Decommissioned in 1971, Page County was transferred to the Hellenic Navy and renamed Kriti. Her fate is unknown.

== Service history ==
Originally laid down as LST-1076 on 16 March 1945 by the Bethlehem Hingham Shipyard, Hingham, Massachusetts, the ship was launched on 14 April 1945, sponsored by Mrs. Lillian J. Ostler. LST-1076 was commissioned on 1 May 1945.

After shakedown in Chesapeake Bay, LST–1076 embarked troops in New York and sailed, 14 June 1945, for Pearl Harbor. She arrived Pearl Harbor on 19 July and began several weeks of rigorous training in the Hawaiian operating areas. LST–1076 stood out from Pearl Harbor on 29 August loaded with occupation troops bound for Sasebo, Japan. She disembarked her passengers on 22 September and by 17 October, she was returning to the United States with war veterans. She arrived at San Diego on 11 December and shortly thereafter went into overhaul. LST–1076 was sent to Vancouver, Washington in April 1946 for inactivation, and decommissioned on 13 June to be assigned to the Columbia Group of the U.S. Pacific Reserve Fleet.

=== 1960–1966 ===
Named USS Page County (LST-1076) on 1 July 1955 the LST remained at Astoria, Oregon on the Columbia River until July 1960 when she was towed to San Diego for modernization and reactivation. Page County was recommissioned on 28 November 1960 and following shakedown carried out local operations off the coast of Southern California through 1961.

On 3 January 1962 Page County sailed for Pearl Harbor to provide logistic support for the United States Army. Page County operated within the Hawaiian Islands in support of the Army through January and shifted to operational control of Commander, Hawaiian Sea Frontier on 1 February for operations in the southern mid-Pacific. On 1 April she was assigned to Joint Task Force 8 in support of nuclear tests being conducted by the U.S. Government. She transported civilian construction crews and their equipment to islands such as Palmyra, Malden, Penrhyn, Washington, Fanning, and Christmas. She completed these assignments on 5 August and returned to San Diego on the 20th.

On 27 October Page County was called on to participate in the Cuban Missile Crisis quarantine. She transited the Panama Canal on 8 November and reached Vieques, Puerto Rico on the 16th. After shuttling troops between Roosevelt Roads and Vieques, she was detached on 1 December to return to San Diego.

On 16 March 1963 Page County put into San Francisco to undergo an extensive MK II FRAM overhaul which was completed in July. She returned to San Diego on 5 August and was assigned to coastal operations.

Between 18 January and 16 February 1965 she participated in "Operation Silver Lance" (one of the largest Navy-Marine Corps training exercises ever held in peacetime). Deteriorating conditions in Vietnam caused her immediate departure on 17 February, for Pearl Harbor, to transport elements of Marine Air Group 13 to Okinawa. She returned to San Diego on 7 May.

=== Vietnam, 1966–1970 ===
Page County deployed to Adak, Alaska from 6 July to 21 October, returning to San Diego for coastal operations until 19 July 1966, when she prepared for deployment to Vietnam. Operating principally between Chu Lai, Da Nang, and also helped land the Army on the beach of Nha Trang, she supported the struggle in South Vietnam until returning to the United States in mid-December.

Resuming local operations, Page County provided services to MiD Pac in evaluating the capabilities of LSTs for mine sweeping, and to Pacific Fleet Command for training exercises and administrative lifts for Hawaiian-based Army and Marine Corps personnel.

Early 1968 found Page County participating in EastPac exercises, training Camp Pendleton Marines and Seabees from Port Hueneme. During the spring she again joined the 7th Fleet for operations in Southeast Asia. From 11 September through 6 November she operated out of Da Nang and returned to San Diego on 24 December, via Hong Kong, Yokosuka, and Pearl Harbor.

After operations on the West Coast, Page County returned to the Western Pacific in the autumn and served in the 7th Fleet into 1970.

=== Greek service ===
Decommissioned on 5 March 1971, she was transferred to Greece (date unknown) under the Security Assistance Program and renamed Kriti (L171). The ship was struck from the Naval Vessel Register on 15 April 1978 and sold under the Security Assistance Program to Greece on 1 July 1978. Her final fate is unknown.

== Awards ==
Page County earned five campaign stars for Vietnam War service.
