= George Williamson (Georgia politician) =

American politician

Member of the Georgia House of Representatives
- In office 1975–1980

Personal details
- Born: January 28, 1946 (age 80) Dougherty County, Georgia, U.S.
- Party: Republican; Democratic
- Education: Georgia State University

George B. Williamson (born January 28, 1946) is an American politician. He served as a member of the Georgia House of Representatives.

== Life and career ==
Williamson was born in Dougherty County, Georgia. He attended Georgia State University.

Williamson served in the Georgia House of Representatives from 1975 to 1980.
