= Max D. Kaley =

American politician

Member of the Georgia House of Representatives for district 19-2
- In office 1977–1980

Personal details
- Born: November 22, 1924 Georgia, United States
- Died: September 30, 2016 (aged 91) Marietta, Georgia
- Party: Democratic
- Profession: attorney

Max Dane Kaley ( November 22, 1924 - September 30, 2016) is an American former politician and judge. He served in the Georgia House of Representatives from 1977 to 1980 as a Democrat.
