= Bettye Lowe =

American politician (1933–2021)

Member of the Georgia House of Representatives from the 43-2 district
- In office 1979–???

Personal details
- Born: April 27, 1933 Dale County, Alabama, U.S.
- Died: May 4, 2021 (aged 88)
- Party: Republican
- Spouse: Tom Lowe
- Children: 4
- Education: Millsaps College

Bettye Lowe (April 27, 1933 – May 4, 2021) was an American politician. She served as a Republican member for the 43-2 district of the Georgia House of Representatives.

== Life and career ==
Lowe was born in Dale County, Alabama. She attended Millsaps College.

In 1979, Lowe was elected to represent the 43-2 district of the Georgia House of Representatives.

Lowe died on May 4, 2021, at the age of 88.
