= Roy Moultrie =

American politician (1932–2024)

Member of the Georgia House of Representatives
- In office 1985–1993

Personal details
- Born: Roy Dean Moultrie; April 2, 1932 Harris County, Georgia, U.S.
- Died: January 8, 2024 (aged 91)
- Party: Democratic
- Education: West Georgia College; Mercer University School of Law

Roy Dean Moultrie (April 2, 1932 – January 8, 2024) was an American politician. He served as a Democratic member of the Georgia House of Representatives.

== Life and career ==
Moultrie was born in Harris County, Georgia on April 2, 1932. He attended West Georgia College and Mercer University School of Law.

Moultrie served in the Georgia House of Representatives from 1985 to 1993.

Moultrie died on January 8, 2024, at the age of 91.
