= James R. Fortune Jr. =

American politician

Member of the Georgia House of Representatives from the 71-1 district
- In office 1979–???
- Preceded by: John R. Carlisle
- Succeeded by: District eliminated

Personal details
- Born: October 20, 1944 (age 81) Fulton County, Georgia, U.S.
- Party: Democratic
- Spouse: Janice Ann Cooper
- Children: 2

James R. Fortune Jr. (born October 20, 1944) is an American politician. He served as a Democratic member for the 71-1 district of the Georgia House of Representatives.

== Life and career ==
Fortune was born in Fulton County, Georgia. He attended the University of Georgia and served in the United States Army.

In 1979, Fortune was elected to represent the 71-1 district of the Georgia House of Representatives, succeeding John R. Carlisle.
