= T. Hayward McCollum =

American politician (1926–2005)

Member of the Georgia House of Representatives from the 134th district
- In office January 12, 1981 – January 10, 1983
- Preceded by: Lillian Parkman
- Succeeded by: Mary M. Young
- In office January 13, 1975 – January 8, 1979
- Preceded by: George Busbee
- Succeeded by: Lillian Parkman

Personal details
- Born: July 26, 1926 Chambers County, Alabama, U.S.
- Died: January 25, 2005 (aged 78)
- Party: Democratic
- Education: Emory University

Thomas Hayward "Mac" McCollum (July 26, 1926 – January 25, 2005) was an American politician. He served as a Democratic member of the Georgia House of Representatives.

== Life and career ==
McCollum was born in Chambers County, Alabama on July 26, 1926. He attended Emory University and served in the United States Navy.

McCollum served in the Georgia House of Representatives from 1975 to 1978 and again from 1981 to 1982.

McCollum died on January 25, 2005, at the age of 78.
