= Arthur M. Gignilliat Jr. =

American politician (1932–2024)

Member of the Georgia House of Representatives
- In office 1966–1980

Personal details
- Born: September 3, 1932 Habersham County, Georgia, U.S.
- Died: February 3, 2024 (aged 91)
- Party: Democratic
- Education: University of Georgia

Arthur M. Gignilliat Jr. (September 3, 1932 – February 3, 2024) was an American politician. He served as a Democratic member of the Georgia House of Representatives.

== Life and career ==
Gignilliat was born in Habersham County, Georgia, on September 3, 1932. He attended the University of Georgia.

Gignilliat served in the Georgia House of Representatives from 1966 to 1980.

Gignilliat died on February 3, 2024, at the age of 91.
