= Don L. Butler =

American politician

Member of the Georgia House of Representatives
- In office 1977–1978

Personal details
- Born: Don Lanzie Butler; July 16, 1927 Raleigh County, West Virginia, U.S.
- Died: January 4, 2016 (aged 88) Lawrenceville, Georgia, U.S.
- Party: Republican
- Education: Montgomery College; George Washington University

Don Lanzie Butler (July 16, 1927 – January 4, 2016) was an American politician. A member of the Republican Party, he served in the Georgia House of Representatives from 1977 to 1978.

== Life and career ==
Butler was born in Raleigh County, West Virginia, the son of Arvie Otis Butler and Garnet Dare McKinney. He served in the armed forces during World War II, which after his discharge, he attended and graduated from Montgomery College. After graduating, he attended George Washington University.

Butler served in the Georgia House of Representatives from 1977 to 1978.

== Death ==
Butler died on January 4, 2016, in Lawrenceville, Georgia, at the age of 88.
