= Ronald C. Truluck =

American politician

Member of the Georgia House of Representatives
- In office 1977–1978

Personal details
- Born: December 27, 1942 (age 83) Richmond County, Georgia, U.S.
- Party: Republican

Ronald Crisp Truluck (born December 27, 1942) is an American politician. He served as a Republican member of the Georgia House of Representatives.

== Life and career ==
Truluck was born in Richmond County, Georgia. He attended Hephzibah High School.

Truluck served in the Georgia House of Representatives from 1977 to 1978.
