= Eugene Housley =

American politician (born 1937)

Grady Eugene Housley

Member of the Georgia House of Representatives for 21st district
- In office 1969–1978

Personal details
- Born: December 19, 1937 (age 88) Copperhill, Tennessee, United States
- Party: Democratic

Grady Eugene Housley (born December 19, 1937) is an American former politician and judge. He served in the Georgia House of Representatives from 1969 to 1978 as a Democrat.
