= G. Richard Chamberlin =

American politician

G. Richard Chamberlin (also known as George Richard Chamberlin, born September 30, 1946) is a former member of the Georgia House of Representatives.

He is the son of George Leroy Chamberlin (March 30, 1920 – December 20, 2003) and Agnes Mary Schumeyer Chamberlin (born 1924) and is a 13th-generation American descended from Henry Chamberlin, an immigrant who first appeared in Hingham, Massachusetts in 1638.

Chamberlin was born in Astoria, New York. A graduate of both The Citadel (military college) and the University of Georgia Law School, Richard was elected to the Georgia House of Representatives for District 73 in 1978, which, (at that time) represented all of Henry County, Georgia. He won this Democratic nomination after removing a 12-year incumbent by a margin of 103 votes.

While serving in office (1978–1983), Richard was nominated by Georgia House of Representatives' Speaker of the House, Tom Murphy, to serve as a member of the Special Judiciary Committee, the Industrial Labor Committee, the Journals Committee, and the Natural Resources Committee.

G. Richard Chamberlin is most noted for his authorship of the “Display of Ten Commandments Legislation,” which was adopted by both Georgia state houses. He is also noted for his co-sponsorship of a Georgia House Resolution in favor of a "Right to Life" Amendment to the Constitution of the United States. This Resolution was passed by the Georgia House of Representatives and forwarded to the United States Congress, where it came within a narrow margin of the 2/3 majority needed to pass.

Other notable achievements include:

• His leadership role over County, State (Georgia), and Congressional Reapportionment in the early 1980s. • His leadership role opposing the Woman's Rights Amendment to the Constitution of the United States. • His vote in favor of the Martin Luther King Holiday Legislation, which passed in the early 1980s. • His founding of the Georgia Roundtable, Inc., a non profit organization with the primary purpose of impacting public policy on a State and National level. • His founding of the Georgia Heritage Foundation, a non-profit organization with the primary purpose of providing the general public with accurate information concerning the Judeo Christian Heritage of America.

Throughout his tenure as state representative, G. Richard Chamberlin also served as a driving force behind the election campaigns of Georgia governor Joe Frank Harris, as well as former Congressmen Newt Gingrich and Larry McDonald.

Retired from public service, Chamberlin now serves as the President of the World Chamberlain Genealogical Society.
