= Don Ballard =

American politician (1927–2019)

W.D. (Don) Ballard

Member of the Georgia State Senate from the 45th district
- In office 1971–1982

Member of the Georgia House of Representatives
- In office 1957–1965
- In office 1967–1970

Personal details
- Born: William Donaldson Ballard; March 15, 1927 Newton County, Georgia, U.S.
- Died: July 2, 2019 (aged 92) Newton County, Georgia, U.S.
- Party: Democratic
- Spouse: Mary McCullogh
- Children: 6
- Education: University of Georgia
- Occupation: Lawyer

Military service
- Allegiance: United States
- Branch/service: United States Navy
- Years of service: 1944–1946
- Battles/wars: World War II

William Donaldson Ballard (March 15, 1927 – July 2, 2019) was an American politician in the state of Georgia.

During World War II, Ballard served in the United States Navy as a demolition expert aboard the LST-1076.

Ballard attended the University of Georgia and was an attorney. In 2012, Ballard marked 60 years of active law practice.

Ballard died July 2, 2019.
