= W. Jones Lane =

American politician

Member of the Georgia House of Representatives
- In office 1961 – September 23, 1980

Personal details
- Born: June 23, 1920 Bulloch County, Georgia, U.S.
- Died: September 23, 1980 (aged 60)
- Party: Democratic
- Children: 4; including Bob Lane
- Education: University of Georgia

W. Jones Lane (June 23, 1920 – September 23, 1980) was an American politician. He served as a Democratic member of the Georgia House of Representatives.

== Life and career ==
Lane was born in Bulloch County, Georgia. He attended the University of Georgia.

Lane served in the Georgia House of Representatives from 1961 to 1980.

Lane died on September 23, 1980, at the age of 60.
