= Michael C. Nichols =

American politician (born 1952)

Member of the Georgia House of Representatives
- In office 1977–1980

Personal details
- Born: Michael Cooper Nichols; January 4, 1952 (age 74) Jefferson County, Alabama, U.S.
- Party: Democratic
- Education: Brown University; Emory University School of Law

Michael Cooper Nichols (born February 4, 1952) is an American politician. A member of the Democratic Party, he served in the Georgia House of Representatives from 1977 to 1980.

== Life and career ==
Nichols was born in Jefferson County, Alabama, the son of Fred William Nichols and Jeanette Cooper. He attended Brown University, earning his BA degree in 1974. He also attended Emory University School of Law, earning his JD degree in 1977.

Nichols served in the Georgia House of Representatives from 1977 to 1980.
