= Clarence R. Vaughn Jr. =

American judge and politician

Member of the Georgia State Senate
- In office 1959–1960

Member of the Georgia House of Representatives
- In office 1961–1982

Personal details
- Born: January 22, 1921 Rockdale County, Georgia, U.S.
- Died: March 26, 2007 (aged 86) Conyers, Georgia, U.S.
- Party: Democratic
- Spouse: Doris Elizabeth Henson
- Children: 2
- Education: University of North Georgia; University of Georgia School of Law
- Occupation: Judge

Clarence R. Vaughn Jr. (January 22, 1921 – March 26, 2007) was an American judge and politician. He served as a Democratic member of the Georgia House of Representatives and the Georgia State Senate.

== Life and career ==
Vaughn was born in Rockdale County, Georgia. He attended the University of North Georgia and the University of Georgia School of Law.

He became a superior court judge of the Rockdale, Georgia, Judicial Circuit.

In 1959, Vaughn was elected to the Georgia State Senate, serving until 1960. In 1961, he was elected to the Georgia House of Representatives, serving until 1982. In the same year, he was elected to serve as a judge for the Rockdale Judicial Circuit.

Vaughn died on March 26, 2007, at his home in Conyers, Georgia, at the age of 86.
