= Donald G. Castleberry =

American politician

Member of the Georgia House of Representatives
- In office 1973–1982

Personal details
- Born: March 23, 1929 Stewart County, Georgia, U.S.
- Died: September 2, 2007 (aged 78)
- Party: Democratic
- Education: Georgia Military College

Donald G. Castleberry (March 23, 1929 – September 2, 2007) was an American politician. He served as a Democratic member of the Georgia House of Representatives.

== Life and career ==
Castleberry was born in Stewart County, Georgia. He attended Richland High School, Georgia Military College and Gupton-Jones School of Mortuary Science.

Castleberry served in the Georgia House of Representatives from 1973 to 1982.

Castleberry died on September 2, 2007, at the age of 78.
