= Greg Pilewicz =

American politician

Member of the Georgia House of Representatives from the 41st district
- In office 1977–1983
- Succeeded by: Charlie Watts

Personal details
- Born: November 29, 1951 San Francisco, California, U.S.
- Died: June 16, 2012 (aged 60)
- Party: Democratic
- Spouse: Helen Lewis
- Education: Oxford College of Emory University; Emory University; Georgia State University

Greg Pilewicz (November 29, 1951 – June 16, 2012) was an American politician. He served as a Democratic member for the 41st district of the Georgia House of Representatives.

== Life and career ==
Pilewicz was born in San Francisco, California, the son of Verma Louise and Peter George Pilewicz. He attended Oxford College of Emory University, Emory University and Georgia State University.

In 1977, Pilewicz was elected to represent the 41st district of the Georgia House of Representatives. He served until 1983, when he was succeeded by Charlie Watts.

Pilewicz died in June 2012, at the age of 60.
