= Bobby L. Hill =

American politician

Bobby Lee Hill (1941–2000) was an American lawyer, civil rights advocate, and politician who served in the Georgia House of Representatives. He worked for the NAACP Legal Defense Fund.

Born in Tignall, Georgia, he attended college in Savannah. He graduated from Savannah State University in 1963 and Howard University Law School in 1967. He represented Chatham County in the state legislature serving for 14 years after being first elected in 1968. In 1982 he lost his re-election campaign to Roy Allen. An interstate interchange was named in his honor.

== See also ==
Georgia Legislative Black Caucus
