= Robert F. Ray =

American politician (1935–2018)

Member of the Georgia House of Representatives
- In office 1982–???

Personal details
- Born: November 21, 1935 Crawford County, Georgia, U.S.
- Died: May 29, 2018 (aged 82)
- Party: Democratic
- Education: Macon Jr. College

Robert F. Ray (November 21, 1935 – May 29, 2018) was an American politician. He served as a Democratic member of the Georgia House of Representatives.

== Life and career ==
Ray was born in Crawford County, Georgia. He attended Macon Jr. College.

In 1982, Ray was elected to the Georgia House of Representatives.

Ray died on May 29, 2018, at the age of 82.
