= Perry J. Hudson =

American politician

Member of the Georgia State Senate from the 35th district
- In office 1967–1983
- Preceded by: Frank E. Coggin
- Succeeded by: Frank E. Coggin

Personal details
- Born: June 14, 1916 Douglas County, Georgia, U.S.
- Died: May 14, 1998 (aged 81)
- Party: Democratic
- Spouse: Miriam Elizabeth Burks
- Children: 3
- Education: University of Georgia

Perry J. Hudson (June 14, 1916 – May 14, 1998) was an American politician. He served as a Democratic member for the 35th district of the Georgia State Senate.

== Life and career ==
Hudson was born in Douglas County, Georgia. At the age of six, he and his family moved to Hapeville, Georgia. He attended the University of Georgia.

Hudson was mayor of Hapeville, Georgia. In 1967, he was elected to represent the 35th district of the Georgia State Senate. He served until 1983, when he was succeeded by Frank E. Coggin.

Hudson died in May 1998 of heart failure at the South Fulton Hospital, at the age of 81.
