= David J. Swann =

American politician (born 1942)

Member of the Georgia House of Representatives from the 90th district
- In office 1977–1983
- Succeeded by: Travis Stanley Barnes

Personal details
- Born: June 13, 1942 (age 84) Montgomery County, Pennsylvania, U.S.
- Party: Republican
- Spouse: Michele Lotterio
- Education: John Carroll University; Lehigh University; Augusta Law School

David J. Swann (born June 13, 1942) is an American politician. He served as a Republican member for the 90th district of the Georgia House of Representatives.

== Life and career ==
Swann was born in Montgomery County, Pennsylvania. He attended John Carroll University, Lehigh University and Augusta Law School.

In 1977, Swann was elected to represent the 90th district of the Georgia House of Representatives. He served until 1983, when he was succeeded by Travis Stanley Barnes.
