= Bill Cooper (Georgia politician) =

American politician (born 1933)

J. William Cooper

Member of the Georgia House of Representatives
- In office 1967–1980
- In office 1985–1987

Personal details
- Born: June 3, 1933 (age 93) Wilkes County, Georgia, U.S.
- Party: Democratic
- Profession: attorney

J. William Cooper (born June 3, 1933) is an American former politician and judge. He served in the Georgia House of Representatives as a Democrat.
