= Ernest Ralston =

American politician (1935–1990)

Member of the Georgia House of Representatives from the 7th district
- In office 1977–1983
- Succeeded by: J. C. Maddox

Personal details
- Born: May 1, 1935 Gordon County, Georgia, U.S.
- Died: February 2, 1990 (aged 54)
- Party: Democratic
- Spouse: Frances Brown (m. 1956)
- Children: 2
- Education: New Mexico State University

Ernest Ralston (May 1, 1935 – February 2, 1990) was an American politician. He served as a Democratic member for the 7th district of the Georgia House of Representatives.

== Life and career ==
Ralston was born in Gordon County, Georgia. He attended New Mexico State University and served in the United States Army. He was a rancher.

In 1977, Ralston was elected to represent the 7th district of the Georgia House of Representatives. He served until 1983, when he was succeeded by J. C. Maddox.

Ralston died in February 1990, at the age of 54.
