= Hank Elliott =

American politician

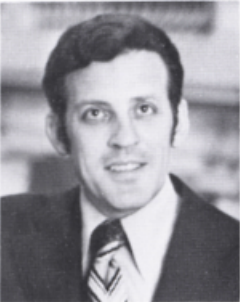

Minority Whip of the Georgia House of Representatives
- In office 1981–1983
- Preceded by: Dick Lane
- Succeeded by: Luther Colbert

Member of the Georgia House of Representatives from the 49th district
- In office 1973–1983
- Preceded by: Guy Tripp (Post 1); Ben Jessup (Post 2)
- Succeeded by: Tom Lawrence

Personal details
- Born: March 22, 1936 (age 90) Polk County, Georgia, United States
- Party: Republican
- Spouse: Jane
- Children: 2
- Education: Auburn University (BS); Emory University (JD)
- Profession: attorney

Ewell Herman Elliott, Jr. (born March 22, 1936) is an American former politician and judge. He served in the Georgia House of Representatives from 1973 to 1983 as a Republican.
