= Kenneth Nix =

American judge and politician

Member of the Georgia House of Representatives from the 20-3 district
- In office 1973–1982
- Succeeded by: George W. Darden

Personal details
- Born: Kenneth Owen Nix; October 4, 1939 Atlanta, Georgia, U. S.
- Died: October 23, 2012 (aged 73) Austell, Georgia, U. S.
- Party: Republican
- Spouse: Charlene Scroggs (m. 1962)
- Children: 5
- Education: Presbyterian College; Emory University
- Occupation: Judge

Kenneth Owen Nix (October 4, 1939 – October 23, 2012) was an American judge and politician. He served as a Republican member of the Georgia House of Representatives for the 20-3 district from 1973 to 1982 and as a judge on the state superior court from 1995 until his retirement in 2010, when he was chief judge.

== Early life and education ==
Nix was born in Atlanta, Georgia, the son of Helen Crawford Brown and Owen Nix. He was raised in grove Park and attended West Fulton High School. After two years at Presbyterian College on a football and baseball scholarship, he transferred to Emory University, where he earned his undergraduate degree in 1961 and his law degree in 1964.

== Career ==
After practicing law privately in Cobb County, Nix ran unsuccessfully in 1970 for a seat in the Georgia House of Representatives, then served as a judge in the city court of Smyrna, Georgia from 1971 to 1972, when he was elected to represent the 20-3 district. He served until 1982, being succeeded by George W. Darden.

In 1982, Nix was elected to serve as a judge for the state court's post 3 in Cobb County. In 1995, he was appointed by Governor Zell Miller to the state superior court, where he served until 2010, becoming chief judge; he retired after admitting to inappropriately touching two female members of his staff.

== Personal life and death ==
Nix married Lillian Scroggs in 1962; they had five children. He died in October 2012 of pancreatic cancer at Tranquility Hospice Care in Austell, Georgia, at the age of 73. Nix coached sports all his life; in 2013, a softball field was named in his memory.
