= P. Benson Ham =

American politician

Member of the Georgia House of Representatives
- In office 1971–1982

Personal details
- Born: January 6, 1934 (age 92) Monroe County, Georgia, U.S.
- Party: Democratic
- Education: Mercer University; Walter F. George Law School

P. Benson Ham (born January 6, 1934) is an American politician. He served as a Democratic member of the Georgia House of Representatives.

== Life and career ==
Ham was born in Monroe County, Georgia. He attended Mercer University and Walter F. George Law School.

Ham served in the Georgia House of Representatives from 1971 to 1982.
