= Paul Trulock =

American politician

Member of the Georgia State Senate from the 10th district
- In office January 12, 1981 – January 12, 1987
- Preceded by: Henry P. Russell Jr.
- Succeeded by: Harold J. Ragan

Personal details
- Born: Paul Hines Trulock III; May 20, 1943 Thomasville, Georgia, U.S.
- Died: April 10, 2020 (aged 76) Thomasville, Georgia, U.S.
- Party: Democratic
- Spouse: Diane Trulock
- Children: 5
- Education: University of Georgia

Paul Hines Trulock III (May 20, 1943 – April 10, 2020) was an American politician. He served as a Democratic member for the 10th district of the Georgia State Senate.

== Life and career ==
Trulock was born in Thomasville, Georgia, the son of Margretta McGavock and Paul Trulock Jr. His father died in 1973. He was raised in Climax, Georgia. Trulock attended Bainbridge High School and the University of Georgia, earning his Bachelor of Science degree in agriculture in 1965.

Trulock bought ownership of Farmer's Peanut Company, which became successful. In 1981, he was elected to represent the 10th district of the Georgia State Senate, defeating Henry P. Russell Jr. in the Democratic primary and succeeding him in the Senate In 1986, he was succeeded by Harold J. Ragan.

Trulock was a member of the First Presbyterian Church in Bainbridge, Georgia.

Trulock died in April 2020 at the Archbold Memorial Hospital, at the age of 76.
