= Gary C. Cason =

American politician

Member of the Georgia House of Representatives from the 96th district
- In office 1977–1983
- Succeeded by: Milton Hirsch

Personal details
- Born: March 2, 1943 (age 83) Muscogee County, Georgia, U.S.
- Party: Republican
- Spouse: Kathyrn Lee Greene
- Children: 8
- Education: Columbus State University; Auburn University

Gary C. Cason (born March 2, 1943) is an American politician. He served as a Republican member for the 96th district of the Georgia House of Representatives.

== Life and career ==
Cason was born in Muscogee County, Georgia. He attended Columbus State University and Auburn University.

In 1977, Cason was elected to represent the 96th district of the Georgia House of Representatives. He served until 1983, when he was succeeded by Milton Hirsch. He ran for re-election in 1984 against Hirsch.
