= Neal Jackson (Georgia politician) =

American politician

Member of the Georgia House of Representatives
- In office 1981–1986

Personal details
- Born: May 31, 1941 Walton County, Georgia, U.S.
- Died: April 18, 2026 (age 84) Walton County, Georgia, U.S.
- Party: Democratic
- Education: University of Georgia

Neal Jackson (May 31, 1941 – April 18, 2026) was an American politician, real estate broker, and businessman. A native of Monroe, Georgia, he served as a Democratic member of the Georgia House of Representatives.

== Life and career ==
Jackson was born in Walton County, Georgia. He was the son of Nelson Roy Jackson and Gladys Treadwell Jackson. He was one of five siblings: Amy, Roy, Cecil, and Marvin preceded him in death. Neal, like his brothers Cecil and Marvin, was a graduate of the University of Georgia. He was a devoted member of Center Hill Baptist Church in the Gratis Community of Walton County.

In 1969, Jackson founded Jackson Realty in Monroe, Georgia, establishing what would become one of the area's longstanding real estate firms. In 1981, Jackson co-founded the Walton-Barrow Board of Realtors. He later served as president of the Georgia Association of Realtors in 1999. From 2001 to 2005, he was appointed to the Georgia Real Estate Commission and served as its chairman in 2004.

Jackson served in the Georgia House of Representatives from 1981 to 1986.

A lifelong advocate for Walton County, he dedicated more than 25 years to the Monroe Downtown Development Authority.

Outside of his professional and political work, Jackson was an avid outdoorsman and horse enthusiast. He raised and exhibited Tennessee Walking Horse and was instrumental in establishing the Walton County Horse Show.

Jackson was married to Linda Jackson. Together, they shared three sons, a stepson, and several grandchildren.

Neal Jackson died on April 18, 2026, at the age of 84.
