= Monty Veazey =

American politician

Member of the Georgia House of Representatives from the 146th district (post 2)
- In office 1977–1983

Personal details
- Born: March 31, 1954 (age 72) Tifton, Georgia, United States
- Party: Democratic

Monty Mobley Veazey (born March 31, 1954) was an American politician. He was a member of the Georgia House of Representatives from 1977 to 1983. He is a member of the Democratic party. He now serves as the president and CEO of the Georgia Alliance of Community Hospitals.
