= Kenneth W. Workman =

American politician

Member of the Georgia House of Representatives from the 56-3 district
- In office 1981–1983
- Preceded by: Tommy Tolbert
- Succeeded by: District eliminated

Member of the Georgia House of Representatives from the 51st district
- In office 1983–1989
- Preceded by: Mobley Childs
- Succeeded by: Thurbert Baker

Personal details
- Born: October 12, 1948 (age 77) Fulton County, Georgia, U.S.
- Party: Democratic
- Spouse: Carole Workman
- Children: 2
- Education: Georgia State University

Kenneth W. Workman (born October 12, 1948) is an American politician. He served as a Democratic member for the 51st and 56-3 district of the Georgia House of Representatives.

== Life and career ==
Workman was born in Fulton County, Georgia. He attended Georgia State University.

In 1981, Workman was elected to the 56-3 district of the Georgia House of Representatives, succeeding Tommy Tolbert. He left office in 1983 when he was elected to the 51st district, succeeding Mobley Childs. He served until 1989, when he was succeeded by Thurbert Baker.
