= Rooney L. Bowen =

American politician

Member of the Georgia State Senate from the 13th district
- In office 1980–2004

Member of the Georgia House of Representatives
- In office 1963–1973

Personal details
- Born: July 25, 1933 Dooly County, Georgia, U.S.
- Died: March 3, 2016 (aged 82) Cordele, Georgia, U.S.
- Party: Republican (2002–2016) Democratic (until 2002)
- Spouse: Marian G. Chandler (div)
- Education: University of Georgia

Rooney L. Bowen, Jr. (July 25, 1933 – March 3, 2016) was an American politician in the state of Georgia.

Born in Dooly County, Georgia, Bowen graduated from Unadilla High School and then attended the University of Georgia. He was an automobile dealer, farmer, and funeral director. Bowen lived in Cordele, Georgia. Bowen served in the Georgia House of Representatives from 1963 to 1973. He then served in the Georgia State Senate from 1980 to 2005. Bowen was a member of the Democratic Party. In 2002, Bowen switched to the Republican Party. He died in Cordele, Georgia in 2016.
