= Hugh Matthews (politician) =

American politician

Hugh D. Matthews

Member of the Georgia House of Representatives from the 145th district
- In office 1979–1987
- Preceded by: Dorsey R. Matthews
- Succeeded by: C. J. Powell

Personal details
- Born: July 23, 1947 (age 79) Colquitt County, Georgia, U.S.
- Party: Democratic
- Spouse: Carolyn Leah Tucker
- Children: 3
- Education: Abraham Baldwin Agricultural College

Hugh D. Matthews (born July 23, 1947) is an American politician. He served as a Democratic member for the 145th district of the Georgia House of Representatives.

== Life and career ==
Matthews was born in Colquitt County, Georgia. He attended Abraham Baldwin Agricultural College, and served in the United States Army.

In 1979, Matthews was elected to the 145th district of the Georgia House of Representatives, succeeding Dorsey R. Matthews. He served until 1987, when he was succeeded by C. J. Powell.
