= Gerald Johnson (Georgia politician) =

American politician

Member of the Georgia House of Representatives from the 66-1 district
- In office 1977–1983
- Succeeded by: District eliminated

Member of the Georgia House of Representatives from the 70th district
- In office 1983–1985
- Preceded by: Claude A. Bray Jr.
- Succeeded by: Carolyn W. Lee

Personal details
- Born: June 8, 1950 (age 76) Cobb County, Georgia, U.S.
- Party: Democratic
- Spouse: Faith Virginia Roper
- Education: Kennesaw State University

Gerald Johnson (born June 8, 1950) is an American politician. He served as a Democratic member for the 66-1 and 70th district of the Georgia House of Representatives.

== Life and career ==
Johnson was born in Cobb County, Georgia. He attended Kennesaw State University.

In 1977, Johnson was elected to represent the 66-1 district of the Georgia House of Representatives, serving until 1983. In the same year, he was elected to represent the 70th district, succeeding Claude A. Bray Jr. He served until 1985, when he was succeeded by Carolyn W. Lee.
