= Janice S. Horton =

American politician

Member of the Georgia State Senate from the 17th district
- In office 1979–1986

Personal details
- Born: January 23, 1945 (age 81) Lamar County, Georgia, U.S.
- Party: Democratic
- Education: Gordon State College; East Carolina University; Tift College

Janice S. Horton (born January 23, 1945) is an American politician. She served as a Democratic member for the 17th district of the Georgia State Senate.

== Life and career ==
Horton was born in Lamar County, Georgia. He attended Gordon State College, East Carolina University and Tift College.

Horton served in the Georgia State Senate from 1979 to 1986, representing the 17th district.
