= Bob Lane (American politician) =

American politician

Member of the Georgia House of Representatives
- In office 1981–2011

Personal details
- Born: October 19, 1947 (age 78) Statesboro, Georgia, United States
- Party: Democratic
- Parent: W. Jones Lane (father)

Bob Lane (born October 19, 1947) is an American politician. He was a member of the Georgia House of Representatives from 1966 to 2004. He is a member of the Republican party.
