= Lorenzo Benn =

American politician

Member of the Georgia House of Representatives from the 38th district
- In office 1981 – June 2, 1990

Personal details
- Born: September 11, 1933 Fulton County, Georgia, U. S.
- Died: June 2, 1990 (aged 56)
- Party: Democratic
- Children: 3
- Education: Long Island University; University of Pennsylvania; University of Iowa

Lorenzo Benn (September 11, 1933 – June 2, 1990) was an American politician. He served as a Democratic member for the 38th district of the Georgia House of Representatives.

== Life and career ==
Benn was born in Fulton County, Georgia, the son of Lilla Merriweather and Legree Benn. He attended Long Island University, the University of Pennsylvania, the University of Iowa and Atlanta Law School.

In 1981, Benn was elected to represent the 38th district of the Georgia House of Representatives. He served until his death.

Benn died in June 1990 of cancer at his home, at the age of 56.
