= William C. Mangum Jr. =

American politician

Member of the Georgia House of Representatives
- In office 1979–1991

Personal details
- Born: January 9, 1934 (age 92) Chesterfield County, South Carolina, U.S.
- Party: Democratic
- Education: San Diego State University

William C. Mangum Jr. (born January 9, 1934) is an American politician. He served as a Democratic member of the Georgia House of Representatives.

== Life and career ==
Mangum was born in Chesterfield County, South Carolina. He attended San Diego State University.

Mangum served in the Georgia House of Representatives from 1979 to 1991.
