= Paul Bolster =

American politician (born 1944)

Member of the Georgia House of Representatives
- In office 1975–1986

Personal details
- Born: Paul Douglass Bolster; February 6, 1944 (age 82) Hancock County, Maine, U. S.
- Party: Democratic
- Spouse: Livija Marta Rieksts
- Children: 3
- Education: Eastern Baptist College; University of Mississippi; University of Georgia; Georgia State University

Paul Douglass Bolster (born February 6, 1944) is an American politician. He served as a Democratic member of the Georgia House of Representatives.

== Life and career ==
Bolster was born in Hancock County, Maine, the son of Albert Douglass Bolster and Velma Johnson. He attended Eastern Baptist College, earning his bachelor's degree in history in 1966. He also attended the University of Mississippi, earning his master's degree in 1967, the University of Georgia, earning his doctorate degree in history in 1972 and Georgia State University, earning his juris doctor degree.

Bolster served in the Georgia House of Representatives from 1975 to 1986. After his service in the House, he worked at Clark College. He was a historian.
