= Richard L. Greene =

- Education: Massachusetts Institute of Technology, Stanford University
- Known for: Superconducting Materials and Properties
- Scientific career
- Fields: Physics
- Workplaces: University of Maryland, IBM, U.S. Navy
- Thesis: Fluorescence in Antiferromagnetic MnF2
- Doctoral advisor: Arthur Schawlow

Richard L. Greene (born 1938) is an American physicist. He is a distinguished university professor at the University of Maryland. Greene is known for his experimental research related to novel superconducting and magnetic materials.

== Career ==
Greene served in the Navy at the San Francisco Naval Shipyard where he was an officer in charge of the construction of the USS Halsey (DLG 23). He was awarded a PhD at Stanford University, where he and his collaborators discovered the first optical signatures of spin waves in insulating antiferromagnetic materials. As a postdoctoral fellow at Stanford he and his collaborators invented the thermal relaxation method for measuring the specific heat of small samples, a technique now widely used commercially in the Quantum Design Physical Properties Measurement System. In 1970 he became a staff member (and later a group manager) at the IBM Research Laboratory in San Jose, CA where he and collaborators discovered the first known polymeric and two-dimensional organic superconductors. In 1989 he became a physics professor and founding director of the Center for Superconductivity Research at the University of Maryland in College Park. His group has made significant contributions to the physics of high temperature superconductors and novel magnetic and topological materials. His over 400 publications are cited over 36,000 times with an h-index of 98. He is a member of the National Academy of Sciences and a Fellow of both the American Physical Society and the American Association for the Advancement of Science. The American Physical Society Dissertation Award for Experiential Condensed Matter Physics is named in his honor. He is the recipient of the 2026 Kamerlingh Onnes Prize for his seminal research on unconventional superconductors.

Greene is also a highly ranked amateur pickleball player. He has won many medals in 80+ events at national tournaments. For example, one gold and two silvers at the 2026 US Open Pickleball Championships in Naples, FL, one gold at the 2024 US Open and one gold and two bronzes at the 2025 Senior National Games in Des Moines, IA.

== Awards and honors ==
- Elected to membership in the National Academy of Sciences, 2026.
- H. Kamerlingh Onnes Prize, 2026.
- IBM Outstanding Contribution Award, August 1975.
- Elected Fellow of the American Physical Society (APS), 1980.
- Elected to Executive Committee of APS Division of Condensed Matter Physics, 1992–1995.
- Thomson - ISI 200 Most Highly cited Physicist, 1981–2001.
- Alford L. Ward Professorship of Physics, University of Maryland, 2007–2010.
- Elected Fellow of the American Association for the Advancement of Science (AAAS), 2010.
- Elected Vice-chair of APS Division of Condensed Matter Physics, 2020–21.
- Distinguished University Professor, University of Maryland, 2022 .
