= Roger Williams (Georgia politician) =

American politician (1933–2019)

Member of the Georgia House of Representatives
- In office April 3, 2001 – January 14, 2013
- Preceded by: Harold Mann
- Succeeded by: Bruce Broadrick
- Constituency: 5th district (2001–2003); 4th district (2003–2013)
- In office January 10, 1977 – January 12, 1987
- Preceded by: Jack H. Cole
- Succeeded by: Jimmy Tyson Griffin
- Constituency: 6th district

Personal details
- Born: William Roger Williams; September 22, 1933 Gainesville, Georgia, U.S.
- Died: September 4, 2019 (aged 85) Dalton, Georgia, U.S.
- Party: Republican (1986–2019)
- Other political affiliations: Democratic (before 1986)
- Spouse: Mary Pope (m. 1956)
- Children: 4
- Education: University of North Georgia (BS)

Military service
- Branch/service: United States Army
- Years of service: 1954–1962
- Rank: Captain

William Roger Williams (September 22, 1933 – September 4, 2019) was an American politician from Georgia. He served two separate times in the Georgia House of Representatives—first as a Democrat, and then from 2001 to 2013 as a Republican.

== Early life and education ==
Williams was born into an Episcopalian family in Gainesville, Georgia, in 1933. After graduating from North Georgia College in 1954, he joined the United States Army, eventually rising to the rank of captain. In his final two years in the Army, Williams went to South Vietnam as a member of a Military Assistance Advisory Group.

After departing the military, Williams moved to Dalton, Georgia, where he began a career in finance. He eventually became president of the Whitfield Finance Co.

== Political career ==
In 1976, Williams ran successfully for the Georgia House of Representatives in a district that included parts of Walker and Whitfield counties. He served as in the chamber as a Democrat until 1987. After five terms, Williams switched to the Republican Party and attempted to run for the Georgia State Senate. He lost narrowly on three occasions: first in 1986, then again in 1988 and 1992.

Williams returned to the Georgia House in 2001 via a special election following the unexpected death of State Representative Harold Mann. He served in the body until his retirement in 2013. Williams was later elected to the State Transportation Board from the 14th district.

== Death ==
Williams died following battles with Alzheimer's disease and Parkinson's disease on September 4, 2019. Speaker of the Georgia House of Representatives David Ralston memorialized Williams as "a dear friend of mine and a solid rock of wisdom and good counsel."
