= Ben Barron Ross =

American politician

Member of the Georgia House of Representatives from the 63rd district
- In office 1965–1987
- In office 1957–1962

Personal details
- Born: July 26, 1921 Jones County, Georgia, United States
- Died: December 30, 2016 (aged 95)
- Party: Democratic
- Spouse: J. Mobley Gamble
- Education: Mercer University
- Occupation: lawyer

Ben Barron Ross (July 26, 1921 – December 30, 2016) was an American politician in the state of Georgia. A lawyer, he is an alumnus of Mercer University. He served in the Georgia House of Representatives from 1957 to 1962 and from 1965 to 1987.
