= Jimmy W. Benefield =

American politician

Member of the Georgia House of Representatives
- In office 1977–2000

Personal details
- Born: August 1, 1941 (age 85) Fulton County, Georgia, U.S.
- Party: Democratic
- Education: LaGrange College; Atlanta Law School

Jimmy W. Benefield (born August 1, 1941) is an American politician. He served as a Democratic member of the Georgia House of Representatives.

== Life and career ==
Benefield was born in Fulton County, Georgia. He attended LaGrange College and Atlanta Law School.

Benefield served in the Georgia House of Representatives from 1977 to 2000. In the 1993 legislative session, a teen boy working as an honorary page reported that a lawmaker showed him a cloth penis attached to an apron. Benefield admitted to wearing the apron but denied showing the fake penis to anyone but adults. He later apologized for bringing a sex toy into the chamber.
