= Ralph J. Balkcom =

American politician

Member of the Georgia House of Representatives from the 140th district
- In office 1977–1990s
- Succeeded by: William Mobley Howell

Personal details
- Born: March 31, 1921 Early County, Georgia, U.S.
- Died: April 21, 2006 (aged 85)
- Party: Democratic
- Spouse: Evelyn Medlin Balkcom
- Children: 2
- Education: Abraham Baldwin Agricultural College

Ralph James Balkcom (March 31, 1921 – April 21, 2006) was an American politician. He served as a Democratic member for the 140th district of the Georgia House of Representatives.

== Life and career ==
Balkcom was born in Early County, Georgia, the son of Ethel Green and James Balkcom. He attended Abraham Baldwin Agricultural College and served in the United States Army Air Forces from 1945 to 1946 and became a staff sergeant. He was a farmer.

In 1977, Balkcom was elected to represent the 140th district of the Georgia House of Representatives, succeeding William Mobley Howell. He served until the 1990s.

Balkcom died in April 2006, at the age of 85.
