= Bobby Parham =

American politician

Bobby Eugene Parham (1941 - February 6, 2017) was an American politician who was the Georgia State Representative for the 141st district of the U.S. state of Georgia. Parham resigned his seat in 2009 to become a member of the State Transportation Board. A special election was held for his seat and the race went into a runoff in December 2009. Rusty Kidd, an independent won the seat and was the next 141st district representative.
