= Jerry D. Jackson =

American politician

Member of the Georgia House of Representatives from the 9th district
- In office January 13, 1975 – January 11, 1993
- Preceded by: William Williams

Personal details
- Born: Jerry Dwayne Jackson; October 7, 1941 (age 84) Hoschton, Georgia, U.S.
- Party: Democratic
- Spouse: Margie Kent (m. 1962)
- Children: 2

Jerry Dwayne Jackson (born October 7, 1941) is an American politician. He served as a Democratic member of the Georgia House of Representatives from 1975 to 1993, primarily from Hall County.

Born in Jackson County, Georgia, Jackson attended North Hall High School, graduating in 1959. In 1975, he won election in the 9-3 district of the Georgia House of Representatives. Jackson served until 1993. He had worked as a real estate agent.
