= Lawrence Stumbaugh =

American politician

Member of the Georgia State Senate from the 55th district
- In office 1975–1990s

Personal details
- Born: August 24, 1940 (age 86) Escambia County, Florida, U.S.
- Party: Democratic
- Spouse: Carole Leone Hollingsworth
- Children: 2
- Education: Lipscomb University

Lawrence Stumbaugh (born August 24, 1940) is an American politician. He served as a Democratic member for the 55th district of the Georgia State Senate.

== Life and career ==
Stumbaugh was born in Escambia County, Florida. He attended Lipscomb University.

In 1975, Stumbaugh was elected to represent the 55th district of the Georgia State Senate. He served until the 1990s.
