= John White (Georgia politician) =

American politician

Member of the Georgia House of Representatives from the 132nd district
- In office 1975–1990s

Personal details
- Born: October 12, 1940 (age 85) Montgomery County, Alabama, U.S.
- Party: Democratic
- Children: 2
- Education: Florida A&M University

John White (born October 12, 1940) is an American politician. He served as a Democratic member for the 132nd district of the Georgia House of Representatives.

== Life and career ==
White was born in Montgomery County, Alabama. He attended Florida A&M University.

White was elected to the 132nd district of the Georgia House of Representatives on November 5, 1974, assuming office in 1975. He served until the 1990s.
