= John C. Foster =

American politician

Member of the Georgia State Senate from the 50th district
- In office 1975–1992

Personal details
- Born: April 2, 1935 (age 91) Habersham County, Georgia, U.S.
- Party: Democratic
- Spouse: Bobbie Helen Carpenter
- Children: 2
- Education: Piedmont University

John C. Foster (born April 2, 1935) is an American politician. He served as a Democratic member for the 50th district of the Georgia State Senate.

== Life and career ==
Foster was born in Habersham County, Georgia. He attended Piedmont University and served in the United States Army.

In 1975, Foster was elected to represent the 50th district of the Georgia State Senate. He was chairperson of the Senate's education committee. He served until 1992.
