= Robert L. Patten (politician) =

American politician

Robert L. Patten II

Member of the Georgia House of Representatives
- In office 1973–?

Personal details
- Born: November 21, 1925 Lakeland, Georgia, United States
- Died: May 15, 1994 (aged 68) Lakeland, Georgia, United States
- Party: Democratic

Robert Lee Patten II (November 21, 1925 – May 15, 1994) was an American politician. He was a member of the Georgia House of Representatives, first elected in 1972. He was a member of the Democratic party.
