= Tom Ramsey (politician) =

American politician

Member of the Georgia State Senate from the 54th district
- In office January 14, 1991 – January 11, 1993
- Preceded by: W. W. Fincher Jr.
- Succeeded by: Stephen B. Farrow

Member of the Georgia House of Representatives from the 3rd district
- In office January 10, 1977 – January 9, 1989
- Preceded by: Gerald H. Leonard
- Succeeded by: Charles Poag

Personal details
- Born: Thomas Polk Ramsey III; September 13, 1945 (age 80) Dalton, Georgia, U.S.
- Party: Democratic
- Spouse: Cynthia Leonard (m. 1976)
- Education: Shorter University (BS)

Military service
- Allegiance: United States
- Branch/service: United States Navy
- Years of service: 1967–1971

Thomas Polk Ramsey III (born September 13, 1945) is an American politician in the state of Georgia. A member of the Democratic Party, he served in the Georgia House of Representatives from 1977 to 1989 and the Georgia State Senate from 1991 to 1993.

== Early life and education ==
Ramsey was born in Dalton, Georgia. After serving in the United States Navy for four years, he graduated from Shorter University with a Bachelor of Science degree in 1975.

== Political career ==
Ramsey was elected to the Georgia House of Representatives in 1976, and served in the chamber for 12 years. During his final term in the House, he sat on three committees: Banks & Banking, Rules, and Public Safety, for which he served as the committee's secretary. He was a resident of Chatsworth during his time in the legislative body.

In 1990, Ramsey was elected to the Georgia State Senate. His tenure in that body lasted only one term, as he chose to run unsuccessfully for the United States House of Representatives in 1992. He was defeated in the Democratic primary election to represent Georgia's 9th congressional district by Nathan Deal. The 1992 campaign has been the subject of media attention for the unusual advertising tactics used by Deal. Most notably, Deal bought out 30 seconds of "bars and tone" error imagery immediately prior to a paid televised address by Ramsey. The advertisement had the effect of tricking viewers into thinking the station was down and depressing viewership of Ramsey's public address.

After a failed run for Georgia Public Service Commission in 1994, Ramsey sought to reclaim his old State Senate seat in 1996. He was defeated by incumbent Senator Don R. Thomas, and subsequently retired from politics.
