= Buddy Childers (politician) =

American politician (1938–2026)

Member of the Georgia House of Representatives
- In office January 13, 1975 – January 10, 2005
- Preceded by: Robert Lowrey
- Constituency: 15th district (1975–1993); 13th district (1993–2005)

Personal details
- Born: October 17, 1938 Rome, Georgia, U.S.
- Died: March 16, 2026 (aged 87)
- Spouse: Martha Bynum
- Children: 2

Eugene Milton "Buddy" Childers (October 17, 1938 – March 16, 2026) was an American politician in the state of Georgia.

== Life and career ==
Childers served in the United States Marine Corps Reserve and graduated from Model high school in Rome, Georgia. He later owned a telecommunications company. Childers served in the Georgia House of Representatives from district 15 as a Democrat from 1974 to 2004. Childers died on March 16, 2026, at the age of 87.
