= Tom Crosby Jr. =

American politician

Member of the Georgia House of Representatives
- In office 1977–1989

Personal details
- Born: December 4, 1928 Pearson, Georgia, United States
- Died: March 24, 2011 (aged 82) Waycross, Georgia, United States
- Party: Democratic

Tom Crosby Jr. (December 4, 1928 – March 24, 2011) was an American politician. He was a member of the Georgia House of Representatives from 1977 to 1989. He was a member of the Democratic party.
