= Willis K. Long =

American politician

Member of the Georgia House of Representatives from the 142nd district
- In office 1975–1993

Personal details
- Born: Willis Keith Long; May 18, 1930 Decatur County, Georgia, U.S.
- Died: May 17, 2001 (aged 70)
- Party: Democratic
- Spouse: Margaret Virginia Widener
- Children: 3

Willis Keith Long (May 18, 1930 – May 17, 2001) was an American politician. He served as a Democratic member of the Georgia House of Representatives for the 142nd district .

== Life and career ==
Long was born in Decatur County, Georgia. He attended Norman College and served in the United States Navy from 1948 to 1952.

In 1975, Long was elected to represent the 142nd district of the Georgia House of Representatives, serving until 1993.
