= W. Rudolph Johnson =

American politician

Member of the Georgia House of Representatives from the 72-4 district
- In office ??? – June 1, 1988

Personal details
- Born: July 1, 1931 Fulton County, Georgia, U.S.
- Died: August 12, 2008 (aged 77)
- Party: Democratic
- Spouse: Ellen Callaway
- Children: 4
- Education: Atlanta Law School

W. Rudolph Johnson (July 1, 1931 – August 12, 2008) was an American politician. He served as a Democratic member for the 72nd district of the Georgia House of Representatives.

== Life and career ==
Johnson was born in Fulton County, Georgia. He attended Forest Park High School and Atlanta Law School.

Johnson was mayor of Lake City, Georgia. He was a member of the Georgia House of Representatives, representing the 72nd district, serving until 1988.

Johnson died in August 2008, at the age of 77.
