= 144th Georgia General Assembly =

Term of state legislature in US state of Georgia

←	143rd	145th	→
- Great Seal of the State of Georgia

Overview
- Legislative body: Georgia General Assembly
- Meeting place: Georgia State Capitol

Senate
- Members: 56
- President of the Senate: Pierre Howard (D)
- Party control: Democratic Party

House of Representatives
- Members: 180
- Speaker of the House: Tom Murphy (D)
- Party control: Democratic Party

The first regular session of the 144th General Assembly of the U.S. state of Georgia met from Monday, January 13, 1997, at 10:00 am, to Monday, March 28, 1997, at which time both houses adjourned sine die.

The second regular session of the Georgia General Assembly opened at 10:00 am on Monday, January 12, 1998, and adjourned sine die on Thursday, March 19, 1998.

== Officers ==
=== Senate ===
==== Presiding Officer ====
Position	Name	Party	District
President	Pierre Howard	Democrat	n/a
President Pro Tempore	Sonny Perdue	Democrat	18

==== Majority leadership ====
Position	Name	District
Senate Majority Leader	Charles Walker	22
Majority Caucus Chairman	Nathan Dean	31
Majority Whip	Richard O. Marable	52

==== Minority leadership ====
Position	Name	District
Senate Minority Leader	Chuck Clay	37
Minority Caucus Chairman	Casey Cagle	49
Minority Whip	Eric Johnson	1

=== House of Representatives ===
==== Presiding Officer ====
Position	Name	Party	District
Speaker of the House	Tom Murphy	Democrat	18
Speaker Pro Tempore	Jack Connell	Democrat	115

==== Majority leadership ====
Position	Name	District
House Majority Leader	Larry Walker	141
Majority Whip	Jimmy Skipper	137
Majority Caucus Chairman	Bill Lee	94
Majority Caucus Secretary	LaNett Stanley-Turner	50

==== Minority Leadership ====
Position	Name	District
House Minority Leader	Bob Irvin	45
Minority Whip	Earl Ehrhart	36
Minority Caucus Chairman	Mike Evans	28
Minority Caucus Vice Chairman	Garland Pinholster	15
Minority Caucus Secretary	Anne Mueller	152

== Members of the Georgia State Senate, 1997–1998 ==
District	Senator	Party	Residence
1	Eric Johnson	Republican	Savannah
2	Diana Harvey Johnson	Democratic	Savannah
3	Rene 'D. Kemp	Democratic	Hinesville
4	Jack Hill	Democratic	Reidsville
5	Joseph A. Burton	Republican	Atlanta
6	Edward E. Boshears	Republican	Brunswick
7	Peg Blitch	Democratic	Homerville
8	Loyce W. Turner	Democratic	Valdosta
9	Don Balfour	Republican	Lilburn
10	Nadine Thomas	Democratic	Ellenwood
11	Harold J. Ragan	Democratic	Cairo
12	Mark Taylor	Democratic	Albany
13	Rooney L. Bowen	Republican	Cordele
14	George Hooks	Democratic	Americus
15	Ed Harbison	Democratic	Columbus
16	Clay Land	Republican	Columbus
17	Mike Crotts	Republican	Conyers
18	Sonny Perdue	Democratic	Bonaire
19	Van Streat	Democratic	Nicholls
20	Hugh M. Gillis Sr.	Democratic	Soperton
21	Robert LaMutt	Republican	Marietta
22	Charles W. Walker	Democratic	Augusta
23	Don Cheeks	Democratic	Augusta
24	Joey Brush	Republican	Appling
25	Floyd Griffin	Democratic	Milledgeville
26	Robert Brown	Democratic	Macon
27	Ed Gochenour	Republican	Macon
28	Rick Price	Republican	Fayetteville
29	Steve Langford	Democratic	LaGrange
30	Sam P. Roberts	Republican	Douglasville
31	Nathan Dean	Democratic	Rockmart
32	Charlie Tanksley	Republican	Marietta
33	Steve Thompson	Democratic	Powder Springs
34	Pam Glanton	Republican	Riverdale
35	Donzella J. James	Democratic	College Park
36	David Scott	Democratic	Atlanta
37	Chuck Clay	Republican	Marietta
38	Ralph David Abernathy III	Democratic	Atlanta
39	Vincent D. Fort	Democratic	Atlanta
40	Michael J. Egan	Republican	Atlanta
41	James W. (Jim) Tysinger	Republican	Atlanta
42	Mary Margaret Oliver	Democratic	Atlanta
43	Connie Stokes	Democratic	Decatur
44	Terrell Starr	Democratic	Forest Park
45	A.C. (Bob) Guhl	Republican	Social Circle
46	Paul C. Broun Sr.	Democratic	Athens
47	Eddie Madden	Democratic	Elberton
48	Bill Ray	Republican	Lawrenceville
49	Casey Cagle	Republican	Gainesville
50	Guy Middleton	Democratic	Dahlonega
51	David Ralston	Republican	Blue Ridge
52	Richard O. Marable	Democratic	Rome
53	Waymond "Sonny" Huggins	Democratic	LaFayette
54	Don R. Thomas	Republican	Dalton
55	Steve Henson	Democratic	Stone Mountain
56	Tom Price	Republican	Roswell

== Members of the Georgia State House of Representatives, 1997–1998 ==
District	Representative	Party	Residence
1	Brian D. Joyce	Republican	Lookout Mountain
2	Mike Snow	Democratic	Chickamauga
3	William H. H. Clark	Republican	Ringgold
4	J .Allen Hammontree	Republican	Dalton
5	Harold Mann	Republican	Dalton
6	Charles Judy Poag	Democratic	Eton
7	Ben N. Whitaker	Republican	East Ellijay
8	Ralph Twiggs	Democratic	Hiawassee
9	Benjamin Bridges	Republican	Cleveland
10	Tom E. Shanahan	Democratic	Calhoun
11	Tim Perry	Democratic	Summerville
12	Paul E. Smith	Democratic	Rome
13	Buddy Childers	Democratic	Rome
14	Jeff Lewis	Republican	White
15	Garland Pinholster	Republican	Ball Ground
16	Steve Stancil	Republican	Canton
17	Chuck F. Scheid III	Republican	Woodstock
18	Thomas B. Murphy	Democratic	Bremen
19	Clint Smith	Republican	Dawsonville
20	Carl Rogers	Democratic	Gainesville
21	James Mills	Republican	Gainesville
22	Jeanette Jamieson	Democratic	Toccoa
23	Alan Powell	Democratic	Hartwell
24	Ralph T. Hudgens	Republican	Hull
25	Scott Tolbert	Republican	Pendergrass
26	Glenn Richardson	Republican	Dallas
27	Bill Cummings	Democratic	Rockmart
28	Mike A. Evans	Republican	Cumming
29	Randy J. Sauder	Republican	Smyrna
30	Frank Bradford	Republican	Smyrna
31	Sharon Cooper	Republican	Marietta
32	Judy Manning	Republican	Marietta
33	Roy E. Barnes	Democratic	Mableton
34	John Wiles	Republican	Kennesaw
35	George H. Grindley Jr.	Republican	Marietta
36	Earl Ehrhart	Republican	Powder Springs
37	Mitchell Adam Kaye Sr.	Republican	Marietta
38	Kem W. Shipp	Republican	Kennesaw
39	Bobby Franklin	Republican	Marietta
40	Don Parsons	Republican	Marietta
41	Mark Burkhalter	Republican	Alpharetta
42	Tom Campbell	Republican	Roswell
43	Dorothy Felton	Republican	Atlanta
44	Sharon R. Tense	Republican	Atlanta
45	Bob Irvin	Republican	Atlanta
46	Kathy Ashe	Republican	Atlanta
47	Jim Martin	Democratic	Atlanta
48	Grace W. Davis	Democratic	Atlanta
49	Pamela Stanley	Democratic	Atlanta
50	LaNett L. Stanley	Democratic	Atlanta
51	James E. "Billy" McKinney	Democratic	Atlanta
52	Henrietta M. Canty	Democratic	Atlanta
53	Bob Holmes	Democratic	Atlanta
54	Tyrone Brooks	Democratic	Atlanta
55	Joe Heckstall	Democratic	East Point
56	Nan Grogan Orrock	Democratic	Atlanta
57	Georganna T. Sinkfield	Democratic	Atlanta
58	Sharon Beasley-Teague	Democratic	Red Oak
59	Bart Ladd	Republican	Doraville
60	J. Max Davis	Republican	Atlanta
61	Doug Teper	Democratic	Atlanta
62	Tom Sherrill	Democratic	Atlanta
63	Betty Jo Williams	Republican	Atlanta
64	Arnold Ragas	Democratic	Stone Mountain
65	Michele D. Henson	Democratic	Stone Mountain
66	June Hegstrom	Democratic	Scottdale
67	Mike Polak	Democratic	Atlanta
68	JoAnn McClinton	Democratic	Atlanta
69	Barbara J. Mobley	Democratic	Decatur
70	Thurbert E. Baker	Democratic	Decatur
71	Vernon Jones	Democratic	Decatur
72	George Maddox	Democratic	Decatur
73	Henrietta E. Turnquest	Democratic	Decatur
74	Barbara J. Bunn	Republican	Conyers
75	Earl O'Neal	Democratic	Conyers
76	Scott Dix	Republican	Stone Mountain
77	Charles E. Bannister	Republican	Lilburn
78	Dr. Roland A. (Ron) Crews	Republican	Norcross
79	Tom Rice	Republican	Norcross
80	Brooks P. Coleman Jr.	Republican	Duluth
81	Ralph L. Johnson	Republican	Duluth
82	Mike Coan	Republican	Lawrenceville
83	Jeffrey L. "Jeff" Williams	Republican	Snellville
84	Jere Johnson	Republican	Grayson
85	Keith Breedlove	Republican	Buford
86	Warren Massey	Republican	Winder
87	Len Walker	Republican	Loganville
88	Louise McBee	Democratic	Athens
89	Keith G. Heard	Democratic	Athens
90	Tom McCall	Democratic	Elberton
91	Frank Stancil	Democratic	Bogart
92	Denny Dobbs	Democratic	Covington
93	Frank I. Bailey, Jr.	Democratic	Riverdale
94	Bill Lee	Democratic	Forest Park
95	Gail M. Buckner	Democratic	Jonesboro
96	Jimmy Benefield	Democratic	Jonesboro
97	Greg Hecht	Democratic	Jonesboro
98	Tom Worthan	Republican	Lithia Springs
99	Bob Snelling	Republican	Douglasville
100	Tracy Stallings	Democratic	Carrollton
101	Jack E. West	Democratic	Bowdon
102	Vance Smith Jr.	Republican	Pine Mountain
103	Lynn Ratigan Smith	Republican	Newnan
104	Lynn Westmoreland	Republican	Tyrone
105	Dan Lakly	Republican	Peachtree City
106	John P. Yates	Republican	Griffin
107	Bill Sanders	Republican	Griffin
108	Steve Cash	Republican	Stockbridge
109	Larry Smith	Democratic	Jackson
110	Curtis S. Jenkins	Democratic	Forsyth
111	Mickey Channell	Democratic	Greensboro
112	Wm. S. (Bill) Jackson	Republican	Appling
113	Ben L. Harbin	Republican	Martinez
114	Robin L. Williams	Republican	Augusta
115	Jack Connell	Democratic	Augusta
116	Alberta J. Anderson	Democratic	Waynesboro
117	Ben Allen	Democratic	Augusta
118	Henry L. Howard	Democratic	Augusta
119	George L. DeLoach	Republican	Hephzibah
120	Helen G. "Sistie" Hudson	Democratic	Sparta
121	Jimmy Lord	Democratic	Sandersville
122	Bobby Eugene Parham	Democratic	Milledgeville
123	Ken Birdsong	Democratic	Gordon
124	David E. Lucas Sr.	Democratic	Macon
125	David Baugh Graves	Republican	Macon
126	Robert A. B. Reichert	Democratic	Macon
127	William C. (Billy) Randall	Democratic	Macon
128	Robert F. Ray	Democratic	Fort Valley
129	Mack Crawford	Republican	Zebulon
130	Jeff Brown	Republican	LaGrange
131	Carl Von Epps	Democratic	LaGrange
132	Ronnie Culbreth	Republican	Columbus
133	Carolyn Fleming Hugley	Democratic	Columbus
134	Maretta Mitchell Taylor	Democratic	Columbus
135	Tom Buck	Democratic	Columbus
136	Calvin Smyre	Democratic	Columbus
137	Jimmy Skipper	Democratic	Americus
138	Johnny W. Floyd	Democratic	Cordele
139	Pam Bohannon	Republican	Warner Robins
140	Lynmore James	Democratic	Montezuma
141	Larry Walker	Democratic	Perry
142	Terry Coleman	Democratic	Eastman
143	DuBose Porter	Democratic	Dublin
144	Larry J. "Butch" Parrish	Democratic	Swainsboro
145	James L. "Jim" Martin	Republican	Stateboro
146	Bob Lane	Democratic	Stateboro
147	Ann R. Purcell	Democratic	Rincon
148	Regina Thomas	Democratic	Savannah
149	Dorothy B. Pelote	Democratic	Savannah
150	Sonny Dixon	Democratic	Garden City
151	Tom Bordeaux	Democratic	Savannah
152	Anne Mueller	Republican	Savannah
153	Burke Day	Republican	Tybee Island
154	Terry E. Barnard	Republican	Glennville
155	Fisher Barfoot	Democratic	Vidalia
156	Newt Hudson	Democratic	Rochelle
157	Ray Holland	Democratic	Ashburn
158	Gerald E. Greene	Democratic	Cuthbert
159	Bob Hanner	Democratic	Parrott
160	Dan E. Ponder	Democratic	Donalsonville
161	Winfred J. Dukes	Democratic	Albany
162	Lawrence R. Robers	Democratic	Albany
163	H. Doug Everett	Republican	Albany
164	A. Richard Royal	Democratic	Camilla
165	Austin Scott	Republican	Tifton
166	Hanson R. Carter	Democratic	Nashville
167	Chuck Sims	Democratic	Ambrose
168	Harry D. Dixon	Democratic	Waycross
169	Tommy Smith	Democratic	Alma
170	Roger C. Byrd	Democratic	Hazlehurst
171	Hinson Mosley	Democratic	Jesup
172	Buddy DeLoach	Republican	Hinesville
173	E. C. Tillman	Democratic	Brunswick
174	Stephen G. Scarlett	Republican	St. Simons Island
175	Charlie Smith Jr.	Democratic	St. Marys
176	Jay Shaw	Democratic	Lakeland
177	Tim Golden	Democratic	Valdosta
178	Henry L. Reaves	Democratic	Quitman
179	Kermit F. "K" Bates Jr.	Democratic	Bainbridge
180	Theo Titus	Republican	Thomasville

== See also ==
- List of Georgia state legislatures
