= 148th Georgia General Assembly =

Term of state legislature in US state of Georgia

←	147th	149th	→
- Great Seal of the State of Georgia

Overview
- Legislative body: Georgia General Assembly
- Meeting place: Georgia State Capitol

Senate
- Members: 56 (34 R, 22 D)
- President of the Senate: Mark Taylor (D)
- Party control: Republican Party

House of Representatives
- Members: 180 (99 R, 80 D, 1 I)
- Speaker of the House: Glenn Richardson (R)
- Party control: Republican Party

The 2005 regular session of the 148th Georgia General Assembly met from January 10, 2005, to March 31, 2005, at which time both houses adjourned sine die. In addition, Governor Sonny Perdue called for a special session, which met from September 6, 2005, to September 10, 2005. This was the first session since Reconstruction that both houses were controlled by Republicans, as the House of Representatives was won by the GOP at the 2004 election. The legislature redrew legislative and congressional maps in 2005 after federal judges struck down both maps which were drawn by the 146th legislature as violating the one person, one vote guarantee of the U.S. Constitution, resulting in a reshuffling of districts which took effect in the next legislature which shored up Republican gains in both chambers and in Congress.

The 2006 regular session of the 148th General Assembly met from January 9, 2006, to March 30, 2006, at which time both houses adjourned sine die.

== Party standings ==
=== Senate ===
Affiliation	Members
Republican Party	34
Democratic Party	22
Other party^{*}	0
Seat vacant^{**}	0
Total	56

=== House of Representatives ===
Affiliation	Members
Republican Party	99
Democratic Party	80
Other party^{*}	1
Seat vacant^{**}	0
Total	180

^{*}Active political parties in Georgia are not limited to the Democratic and Republican parties. Libertarians, Greens, the Southern Party of Georgia, and others, run candidates in numerous elections. However, for the 2005-06 session of the General Assembly, only one legislator was not from the two major parties, and he did not run as a member of any other party.

== Officers ==
=== Senate ===
==== Presiding Officer ====
Position	Name	Party	District
President	Mark Taylor	Democrat	n/a
President Pro Tempore	Eric Johnson	Republican	1

==== Majority leadership ====
Position	Name	District
Senate Majority Leader	Bill Stephens	27
Majority Caucus Chairman	Don Balfour	9
Majority Whip	Mitch Seabaugh	28

==== Minority leadership ====
Position	Name	District
Senate Minority Leader	Robert Brown	26
Minority Caucus Chairman	Tim Golden	8
Minority Whip	David I. Adelman	42
Minority Whip	Gloria Butler	55

=== House of Representatives ===
==== Presiding Officer ====
Position	Name	Party	District
Speaker of the House	Glenn Richardson	Republican	19
Speaker Pro Tempore	Mark Burkhalter	Republican	50
Speaker Emeritus	Terry Coleman	Democrat	144

==== Majority leadership ====
Position	Name	District
House Majority Leader	Jerry Keen	179
Majority Caucus Chairman	Sharon Cooper	41
Majority Caucus Vice Chairman	Jay Roberts	154
Majority Caucus Secretary	Sue Burmeister	119
Majority Whip	Barry A. Fleming	117

==== Minority leadership ====
Position	Name	District
House Minority Leader	DuBose Porter	143
Minority Caucus Chairman	Calvin Smyre	132
Minority Caucus Vice Chairman	Nan Grogan Orrock	58
Minority Caucus Secretary	Nikki T. Randall	138
Minority Whip	Carolyn Fleming Hugley	133

== Members of the Georgia State Senate, 2005-2006 ==
District	Senator	Party	Residence
1	Eric Johnson	Republican	Savannah
2	Regina Thomas	Democratic	Savannah
3	Jeff Chapman	Republican	Brunswick
4	Jack Hill	Republican	Reidsville
5	Curt Thompson	Democratic	Norcross
6	Doug Stoner	Democratic	Smyrna
7	Greg Goggans	Republican	Douglas
8	Tim Golden	Democratic	Valdosta
9	Don Balfour	Republican	Snellville
10	Emanuel D. Jones	Democratic	Decatur
11	John Bulloch	Republican	Ochlocknee
12	Michael S. Meyer von Bremen	Democratic	Albany
13	Joseph I. Carter	Republican	Tifton
14	George Hooks	Democratic	Americus
15	Ed Harbison	Democratic	Columbus
16	Ronnie Chance	Republican	Tyrone
17	John Douglas	Republican	Covington
18	Cecil Staton	Republican	Macon
19	Tommie Williams	Republican	Lyons
20	Ross Tolleson	Republican	Perry
21	Chip Rogers	Republican	Woodstock
22	Ed Tarver	Democratic	Augusta
23	J.B. Powell	Democratic	Blythe
24	Jim Whitehead	Republican	Evans
25	Johnny Grant	Republican	Milledgeville
26	Robert Brown	Democratic	Macon
27	Bill Stephens	Republican	Canton
28	Mitch Seabaugh	Republican	Sharpsburg
29	Seth Harp	Republican	Midland
30	Bill Hamrick	Republican	Carrollton
31	Bill Heath	Republican	Bremen
32	Judson H. Hill	Republican	Marietta
33	Steve Thompson	Democratic	Marietta
34	Valencia Seay	Democratic	Riverdale
35	Kasim Reed	Democratic	Atlanta
36	Sam Zamarripa	Democratic	Atlanta
37	John J. Wiles	Republican	Marietta
38	Horacena Tate	Democratic	Atlanta
39	Vincent D. Fort	Democratic	Atlanta
40	Daniel J. Weber	Republican	Dunwoody
41	Steve Henson	Democratic	Tucker
42	David Adelman	Democratic	Decatur
43	Steen Miles	Democratic	Decatur
44	Terrell Starr	Democratic	Jonesboro
45	Renee S. Unterman	Republican	Buford
46	Brian P. Kemp	Republican	Athens
47	Ralph T. Hudgens	Republican	Comer
48	David J. Shafer	Republican	Duluth
49	Casey Cagle	Republican	Chestnut Mountain
50	Nancy Schaefer	Republican	Turnerville
51	Chip Pearson	Republican	Dawsonville
52	Preston W. Smith	Republican	Rome
53	Jeff E. Mullis	Republican	Chickamauga
54	Don R. Thomas	Republican	Dalton
55	Gloria Butler	Democratic	Stone Mountain
56	Dan Moody	Republican	Alpharetta

== Members of the Georgia State House of Representatives, 2005–2006 ==
District	Representative	Party	Residence
1	Jay Neal	Republican	LaFayette
2	Martin Scott	Republican	Rossville
3	Ronald L. Forster	Republican	Ringgold
4	Roger Williams	Republican	Dalton
5	John D. Meadows, III	Republican	Calhoun
6	Tom Dickson	Republican	Cohutta
7	David Ralston	Republican	Blue Ridge
8	Charles F. Jenkins	Democratic	Blairsville
9	Amos Amerson	Republican	Dahlonega
10	Benjamin D. Bridges, Sr.	Republican	Cleveland
11	Barbara Massey Reece	Democratic	Menlo
12	Tom Graves	Republican	Ranger
13	Paul E. Smith	Democratic	Rome
14	Barry Dean Loudermilk	Republican	Cassville
15	Jeff Lewis	Republican	White
16	Bill Cummings	Democratic	Rockmart
17	Howard R. Maxwell	Republican	Dallas
18	Mark Butler	Republican	Carrollton
19	Glenn Richardson	Republican	Hiram
20	Charlice H. Byrd	Republican	Woodstock
21	Calvin Hill	Republican	Canton
22	Chuck Scheid	Republican	Woodstock
23	Jack Murphy	Republican	Cumming
24	Tom Knox	Republican	Suwanee
25	James Mills	Republican	Gainesville
26	Carl Rogers	Republican	Gainesville
27	Stacey G. Reece	Republican	Gainesville
28	Jeanette Jamieson	Democratic	Toccoa
29	Alan Powell	Democratic	Hartwell
30	Tom McCall	Republican	Elberton
31	Tommy Benton	Republican	Jefferson
32	Judy Manning	Republican	Marietta
33	Don Wix	Democratic	Austell
34	Rich Golick	Republican	Smyrna
35	Ed Setzler	Republican	Acworth
36	Earl Ehrhart	Republican	Powder Springs
37	Terry Johnson	Democratic	Marietta
38	Steve Tumlin	Republican	Marietta
39	Alisha Thomas Morgan	Democratic	Austell
40	Rob Teilhet	Democratic	Smyrna
41	Sharon Cooper	Republican	Marietta
42	Don Parsons	Republican	Marietta
43	Bobby Franklin	Republican	Marietta
44	Sheila Jones	Democratic	Atlanta
45	Matt Dollar	Republican	Marietta
46	Jan Jones	Republican	Milton
47	Chuck Martin	Republican	Alphretta
48	Harry Geisinger	Republican	Roswell
49	Wendell Willard	Republican	Sandy Springs
50	Mark Burkhalter	Republican	Johns Creek
51	Tom Rice	Republican	Norcross
52	Joe Wilkinson	Republican	Atlanta
53	LaNett Stanley-Turner	Democratic	Atlanta
54	Edward Lindsey	Republican	Atlanta
55	"Able" Mable Thomas	Democratic	Atlanta
56	Kathy Ashe	Democratic	Atlanta
57	Pat Gardner	Democratic	Atlanta
58	Nan Grogan Orrock	Democratic	Atlanta
59	Douglas C. Dean	Democratic	Atlanta
60	Georganna T. Sinkfield	Democratic	Atlanta
61	Robert A. "Bob" Holmes	Democratic	East Point
62	Joe Heckstall	Democratic	East Point
63	Tyrone L. Brooks, Sr.	Democratic	Atlanta
64	Roger B. Bruce	Democratic	Atlanta
65	Sharon Beasley-Teague	Democratic	Red Oak
66	Virgil Fludd	Democratic	Tyrone
67	Bill Hembree	Republican	Winston
68	Tim Bearden	Republican	Villa Rica
69	Jeff Brown	Republican	LaGrange
70	Lynn Ratigan Smith	Republican	Newnan
71	Billy Horne	Republican	Sharpsburg
72	Dan Lakly	Republican	Peachtree City
73	John P. Yates	Republican	Griffin
74	Roberta Abdul-Salaam	Democratic	Riverdale
75	Ron Dodson	Independent	Lake City
76	Gail M. Buckner	Democratic	Jonesboro
77	Darryl Jordan	Democratic	Riverdale
78	Mike Barnes	Democratic	Duluth
79	Fran Millar	Republican	Atlanta
80	Mike Jacobs	Democratic	Brookhaven
81	Jill Chambers	Republican	Atlanta
82	Paul Jennings	Republican	Atlanta
83	Mary Margaret Oliver	Democratic	Decatur
84	JoAnn McClinton	Democratic	Atlanta
85	Stephanie Stuckey Benfield	Democratic	Atlanta
86	Karla Drenner	Democratic	Avondale Estates
87	Michele D. Henson	Democratic	Stone Mountain
88	Billy Mitchell	Democratic	Stone Mountain
89	Earnest "Coach" Williams	Democratic	Avondale Estates
90	Howard Mosby	Democratic	Atlanta
91	Stan Watson	Democratic	Decatur
92	Pam Stephenson	Democratic	Atlanta
93	Walter Ronnie Sailor, Jr.	Democratic	Lithonia
94	Randal Mangham	Democratic	Lithonia
95	Robert F. Mumford	Republican	Loganville
96	Pedro Rafael Marin	Democratic	Duluth
97	Brooks P. Coleman, Jr.	Republican	Duluth
98	Bobby Clifford Reese	Republican	Buford
99	Hugh Floyd	Democratic	Norcross
100	Brian W. Thomas	Democratic	Lilburn
101	Mike Coan	Republican	Lawrenceville
102	Clay Cox	Republican	Lilburn
103	David Casas	Republican	Lilburn
104	John Wilson Heard	Republican	Lawrenceville
105	Donna Sheldon	Republican	Dacula
106	Melvin Everson	Republican	Snellville
107	Len Walker	Republican	Loganville
108	Terry Lamar England	Republican	Auburn
109	Steve Davis	Republican	McDonough
110	John Lunsford	Republican	McDonough
111	Jeff May	Republican	Monroe
112	Doug Holt	Republican	Social Circle
113	Bob Smith	Republican	Watkinsville
114	Keith Heard	Democratic	Athens
115	Jane Kidd	Democratic	Athens
116	Mickey Channell	Republican	Greensboro
117	Barry A. Fleming	Republican	Harlem
118	Ben L. Harbin	Republican	Evans
119	Sue Burmeister	Republican	Augusta
120	Quincy Murphy	Democratic	Augusta
121	Henry Howard	Democratic	Augusta
121	Earnestine Howard	Democratic	Augusta
122	Pete Warren	Democratic	Augusta
123	Alberta Anderson	Democratic	Waynesboro
124	Sistie Hudson	Democratic	Sparta
125	Jim Cole	Republican	Monticello
126	David Knight	Republican	Griffin
127	Mack Crawford	Republican	Concord
128	Carl Von Epps	Democratic	LaGrange
129	Vance Smith, Jr.	Republican	Columbus
130	Debbie Buckner	Democratic	Junction City
131	Richard H. Smith	Republican	Columbus
132	Calvin Smyre	Democratic	Columbus
133	Carolyn Fleming Hugley	Democratic	Columbus
134	Mike Cheokas	Democratic	Americus
135	Lynmore James	Democratic	Montezuma
136	Robert Ray	Democratic	Fort Valley
137	David B. Graves	Republican	Macon
138	Nikki T. Randall	Democratic	Macon
139	David E. Lucas, Sr.	Democratic	Macon
140	Allen G. Freeman	Republican	Macon
141	Bobby Eugene Parham	Democratic	Milledgeville
142	Jimmy Lord	Democratic	Sandersville
143	DuBose Porter	Democratic	Dublin
144	Terry Coleman	Democratic	Eastman
145	Willie Lee Talton	Republican	Warner Robins
146	Larry O'Neal	Republican	Bonaire
147	Johnny W. Floyd	Republican	Cordele
148	Bob Hanner	Democratic	Parrott
149	Gerald E. Greene	Democratic	Cuthbert
150	Winfred J. Dukes	Democratic	Albany
151	Freddie Sims	Democratic	Dawson
152	Ed Rynders	Republican	Albany
153	Austin Scott	Republican	Tifton
154	Jay Roberts	Republican	Ocilla
155	Greg Morris	Republican	Vidalia
156	Larry "Butch" Parrish	Republican	Swainsboro
157	Jon G. Burns	Republican	Newington
158	Bob Lane	Republican	Brooklet
159	Buddy Carter	Republican	Pooler
160	Bob Bryant	Democratic	Garden City
161	Lester Jackson	Democratic	Savannah
162	Tom Bordeaux	Democratic	Savannah
163	Burke Day	Republican	Savannah
164	Ron Stephens	Republican	Savannah
165	Al Williams	Democratic	Midway
166	Terry E. Barnard	Republican	Glennville
167	Roger Bert Lane	Republican	Darien
168	Tommy Smith	Republican	Nicholls
169	Chuck Sims	Republican	Ambrose
170	Penny Houston	Republican	Nashville
171	A. Richard Royal	Democratic	Camilla
172	Gene Maddox	Republican	Cairo
173	Mike Keown	Republican	Thomasville
174	Ellis Black	Democratic	Valdosta
175	Ron Borders	Democratic	Valdosta
176	Jay Shaw	Democratic	Lakeland
177	Mark Hatfield	Republican	Waycross
178	George Hinson Mosley	Republican	Jesup
179	Jerry Keen	Republican	Brunswick
180	Cecily A. Hill	Republican	Woodbine

- Henry Howard died in office of a heart attack on October 3, 2005. A special election was held on November 8, 2005, to fill the seat, which was won by Rep. Howard's widow, Earnestine Howard. She was sworn in on November 17, 2005, and will serve out the remainder of her late husband's term of office.

== Notable Legislation ==
=== 2005 general session ===
==== Voting ====
House Bill 244 requires voters to provide photographic identification at polling locations in order to vote and makes voting by absentee ballot easier, and also reinstituted the majority vote and runoffs for primaries and general elections which were abolished by the Democratic-majority General Assembly in 1995. Amid great controversy, the law was signed by Governor Perdue on April 22, 2005. Although the law received preclearance from the Department of Justice under the provisions of the Voting Rights Act, the law was later ruled unconstitutional by a court in Rome, Georgia. The current status of the law remains uncertain.

=== 2006 general session ===
==== Voting ====
Senate Bill 84, like H.B. 244, requires photographic identification at poll locations to vote. To address some of the concerns raised by the court ruling against H.B. 244, S.B. 84 has more extensive provisions for assisting those without photographic identification to obtain acceptable identification. The bill was passed by both chambers and signed by Governor Perdue on January 26, 2006. Like H.B. 244, S.B. 84 received preclearance from the Justice Department, although it is currently being challenged in court.

==== Eminent domain ====
House Bill 1313 , which would restrict the uses for which private property can be taken via eminent domain, passed both the House and the Senate with no "no" votes. The bill is expected to be signed by Governor Perdue.

House Resolution 1306 would amend the state constitution by replacing language allowing broad freedom to apply eminent domain with more restrictive language providing for additional restrictions as specified by laws such as H.B. 1313. The resolution passed the House and the Senate and was signed by Governor Perdue, and the question of its final adoption will be put to Georgia voters in the November election.

==== Immigration ====
Senate Bill 529 was strongly advocated by Senator Chip Rodgers and requires beneficiaries of many state services to provide proof of residency. Most Democrats voted against the legislation, but it nevertheless passed the House and Senate and was signed into law by Governor Perdue on April 17, 2006.

== See also ==
- List of Georgia state legislatures
