= 146th Georgia General Assembly =

Term of state legislature in US state of Georgia

| ← | 145th | 147th | → |
- Great Seal of the State of Georgia

Overview
- Legislative body: Georgia General Assembly
- Meeting place: Georgia State Capitol

Senate
- Members: 56 (28 D, 28 R)
- President of the Senate: Mark Taylor (D)
- Party control: Democratic Party

House of Representatives
- Members: 180 (105 D, 74 R, 1 I)
- Speaker of the House: Tom Murphy (D)
- Party control: Democratic Party

== Overview ==
The first regular session of the 146th General Assembly of the U.S. state of Georgia met from Monday, January 8, 2001, at 10:00 am, to Friday, March 21, at 11:57 pm, at which time both houses adjourned sine die. 298 House bills and 97 Senate bills passed.

The second regular session of the Georgia General Assembly opened at 10:00 am on Monday, January 14, 2002, and adjourned sine die at 3:44pm on Friday, April 11, 2002.

== Officers ==
=== Senate ===
==== Presiding Officer ====
| Position | Name | Party | District |
|---|---|---|---|
| President | Mark Taylor | Democrat | n/a |
| President Pro Tempore | Terrell Starr | Democrat | 44 |

==== Majority leadership ====
| Position | Name | District |
|---|---|---|
| Senate Majority Leader | Charles W. Walker | 22 |
| Majority Caucus Chairman | Nathan Dean | 31 |
| Majority Whip | Richard O. Marable | 52 |

==== Minority leadership ====
| Position | Name | District |
|---|---|---|
| Senate Minority Leader | Eric Johnson | 1 |
| Minority Caucus Chairman | Bill Stephens | 51 |
| Minority Whip | Tom Price | 56 |

=== House of Representatives ===
==== Presiding Officer ====
| Position | Name | Party | District |
|---|---|---|---|
| Speaker of the House | Tom Murphy | Democrat | 18 |
| Speaker Pro Tempore | Jack Connell | Democrat | 115 |

==== Majority leadership ====
| Position | Name | District |
|---|---|---|
| House Majority Leader | Larry Walker | 141 |
| Majority Whip | Jimmy Skipper | 137 |
| Majority Caucus Chairman | Calvin Smyre | 136 |
| Majority Caucus Secretary | LaNett Stanley-Turner | 50 |

==== Minority Leadership ====
| Position | Name | District |
|---|---|---|
| House Minority Leader | Lynn Westmoreland | 104 |
| Minority Whip | Earl Ehrhart | 36 |
| Minority Caucus Chairman | Garland Pinholster | 15 |
| Minority Caucus Vice Chairman | Sharon Cooper | 31 |
| Minority Caucus Secretary | Anne Mueller | 152 |

== Members of the Georgia State Senate, 2001–2002 ==
| District | Senator | Party | Residence |
|---|---|---|---|
| 1 | Eric Johnson | Republican | Savannah |
| 2 | Regina Thomas | Democratic | Savannah |
| 3 | Rene 'D. Kemp | Democratic | Hinesville |
| 4 | Jack Hill | Republican | Reidsville |
| 5 | Joseph A. Burton | Republican | Atlanta |
| 6 | Tommie Williams | Republican | Lyons |
| 7 | Peg Blitch | Democratic | Homerville |
| 8 | Tim Golden | Democratic | Valdosta |
| 9 | Don Balfour | Republican | Snellville |
| 10 | Nadine Thomas | Democratic | Decatur |
| 11 | Harold J. Ragan | Democratic | Cairo |
| 12 | Michael S. Meyer von Bremen | Democratic | Albany |
| 13 | Rooney L. Bowen | Republican | Cordele |
| 14 | George Hooks | Democratic | Americus |
| 15 | Ed Harbison | Democratic | Columbus |
| 16 | Seth Harp | Republican | Midland |
| 17 | Mike Crotts | Republican | Atlanta |
| 18 | Sonny Perdue | Republican | Bonaire |
| 19 | Van Streat Jr. | Democratic | Nicholls |
| 20 | Hugh Gillis | Democratic | Soperton |
| 21 | Robert LaMutt | Republican | Marietta |
| 22 | Charles W. Walker | Democratic | Augusta |
| 23 | Don Cheeks | Republican | Augusta |
| 24 | Joey Brush | Republican | Martinez |
| 25 | Faye Smith | Democratic | Milledgeville |
| 26 | Robert Brown | Democratic | Macon |
| 27 | Susan W. Cable | Republican | Macon |
| 28 | Mitch Seabaugh | Republican | Sharpsburg |
| 29 | Daniel W. Lee | Republican | LaGrange |
| 30 | Bill Hamrick | Republican | Carrollton |
| 31 | Nathan Dean | Democratic | Rockmart |
| 32 | Charlie Tanksley | Republican | Marietta |
| 33 | Steve Thompson | Democratic | Marietta |
| 34 | Greg Hecht | Democratic | Morrow |
| 35 | Donzella J. James | Democratic | Atlanta |
| 36 | David Scott | Democratic | Atlanta |
| 37 | J. Phillip (Phil) Gingrey | Republican | Marietta |
| 38 | Horacena Tate | Democratic | Atlanta |
| 39 | Vincent D. Fort | Democratic | Atlanta |
| 40 | Rusty Paul | Republican | Atlanta |
| 41 | Bart Ladd | Republican | Doraville |
| 42 | Mike Polak | Democratic | Atlanta |
| 43 | Connie Stokes | Democratic | Decatur |
| 44 | Terrell Starr | Democratic | Jonesboro |
| 45 | A.C. (Bob) Guhl | Republican | Social Circle |
| 46 | Doug Haines | Democratic | Athens |
| 47 | Michael Beatty | Republican | Jefferson |
| 48 | Bill Ray | Republican | Lawrenceville |
| 49 | Casey Cagle | Republican | Chestnut Mountain |
| 50 | Carol Jackson | Democratic | Cleveland |
| 51 | Bill Stephens | Republican | Canton |
| 52 | Richard O. Marable | Democratic | Rome |
| 53 | Jeff E. Mullis | Republican | Chickamauga |
| 54 | Don R. Thomas | Republican | Dalton |
| 55 | Gloria Butler | Democratic | Stone Mountain |
| 56 | Tom Price | Republican | Roswell |

== Members of the Georgia State House of Representatives, 2001–2002 ==
| District | Representative | Party | Residence |
|---|---|---|---|
| 1 | Brian Joyce | Republican | Lookout Mountain |
| 2 | Mike Snow | Democratic | Chickamauga |
| 3 | Ronald L. Forster | Republican | Ringgold |
| 4 | Allen Hammontree | Republican | Cohutta |
| 5 | Roger Williams | Republican | Dalton |
| 6 | Charles Judy Poag | Democratic | Eton |
| 7 | Amos Amerson | Republican | Dahlonega |
| 8 | Ralph Twiggs | Democratic | Hiawassee |
| 9 | Benjamin Bridges | Republican | Cleveland |
| 10 | Tom E. Shanahan | Democratic | Calhoun |
| 11 | Barbara Massey Reece | Democratic | Menlo |
| 12 | Paul E. Smith | Democratic | Rome |
| 13 | Buddy Childers | Democratic | Rome |
| 14 | Jeff Lewis | Republican | White |
| 15 | Garland F. Pinholster | Republican | Ball Ground |
| 16 | Steve Stancil | Republican | Canton |
| 16 | Diane Z. Grasse | Republican | Canton |
| 17 | Chuck Scheid | Republican | Woodstock |
| 18 | Thomas B. Murphy | Democratic | Bremen |
| 19 | Clint Smith | Republican | Gainesville |
| 20 | Carl Rogers | Democratic | Gainesville |
| 21 | James Mills | Republican | Gainesville |
| 22 | Jeanette Jamieson | Democratic | Toccoa |
| 23 | Alan Powell | Democratic | Hartwell |
| 24 | Ralph T. Hudgens | Republican | Colbert |
| 25 | Pat Bell | Democratic | Jefferson |
| 26 | Glenn Richardson | Republican | Dallas |
| 27 | Bill Cummings | Democratic | Rockmart |
| 28 | Tom Knox | Republican | Cumming |
| 29 | Ginger Collins | Republican | Atlanta |
| 30 | Rich Golick | Republican | Smyrna |
| 31 | Sharon Cooper | Republican | Marietta |
| 32 | Judy Manning | Republican | Marietta |
| 33 | Don Wix | Democratic | Mableton |
| 34 | John Wiles | Republican | Marietta |
| 35 | Terry Johnson | Democratic | Marietta |
| 36 | Earl Ehrhart | Republican | Powder Springs |
| 37 | Mitchell Kaye | Republican | Marietta |
| 38 | Roger Hines | Republican | Kennesaw |
| 39 | Bobby Franklin | Republican | Marietta |
| 40 | Don Parsons | Republican | Marietta |
| 41 | Mark Burkhalter | Republican | Alpharetta |
| 42 | Tom Campbell | Republican | Roswell |
| 43 | Joe Wilkinson | Republican | Sandy Springs |
| 44 | Wendell Willard | Republican | Dunwoody |
| 45 | Bob Irvin | Republican | Atlanta |
| 46 | Kathy Ashe | Democratic | Atlanta |
| 47 | Pat Gardner | Democratic | Atlanta |
| 48 | Douglas C. Dean | Democratic | Atlanta |
| 49 | Pam Stanley | Democratic | Atlanta |
| 50 | LaNett Stanley-Turner | Democratic | Atlanta |
| 51 | James E. "Billy" McKinney | Democratic | Atlanta |
| 52 | Kasim Reed | Democratic | Atlanta |
| 53 | Robert A. "Bob" Holmes | Democratic | Atlanta |
| 54 | Tyrone L. Brooks Sr. | Democratic | Atlanta |
| 55 | Joe Heckstall | Democratic | East Point |
| 56 | Nan Grogan Orrock | Democratic | Atlanta |
| 57 | Georganna T. Sinkfield | Democratic | Atlanta |
| 58 | Sharon Beasley-Teague | Democratic | Red Oak |
| 59 | Fran Millar | Republican | Dunwoody |
| 60 | J. Max Davis | Republican | Atlanta |
| 61 | Doug Teper | Democratic | Atlanta |
| 62 | Sally Harrell | Democratic | Atlanta |
| 63 | Paul Jennings | Republican | Atlanta |
| 64 | Arnold Ragas | Democratic | Stone Mountain |
| 65 | Michele D. Henson | Democratic | Stone Mountain |
| 66 | Karla Drenner | Democratic | Avondale Estates |
| 67 | Stephanie Stuckey Benfield | Democratic | Atlanta |
| 68 | JoAnn McClinton | Democratic | Atlanta |
| 69 | Barbara J. Mobley | Democratic | Decatur |
| 70 | Stan Watson | Democratic | Decatur |
| 71 | Ron Sailor Jr. | Democratic | Decatur |
| 72 | George Maddox | Democratic | Decatur |
| 73 | Henrietta E. Turnquest | Democratic | Decatur |
| 74 | Barbara J. Bunn | Republican | Conyers |
| 75 | Randal Mangham | Democratic | Decatur |
| 76 | Scott Dix | Republican | Lilburn |
| 77 | Charles E. Bannister | Republican | Lilburn |
| 78 | Mary Hodges Squires | Democratic | Norcross |
| 79 | Tom Rice | Republican | Norcross |
| 80 | Brooks P. Coleman Jr. | Republican | Duluth |
| 81 | Gene Callaway | Republican | Lilburn |
| 82 | Mike Coan | Republican | Lawrenceville |
| 83 | Jeffrey L. "Jeff" Williams | Republican | Snellville |
| 84 | Renee S. Unterman | Republican | Loganville |
| 85 | Bobby C. Reese | Republican | Sugar Hill |
| 86 | Warren Massey | Republican | Winder |
| 87 | Len Walker | Republican | Loganville |
| 88 | Louise McBee | Democratic | Athens |
| 89 | Keith Heard | Democratic | Athens |
| 90 | Tom McCall | Democratic | Elberton |
| 91 | Bob Smith | Republican | Watkinsville |
| 92 | Jim Stokes | Democratic | Covington |
| 93 | Valencia Seay | Democratic | College Park |
| 94 | Ron Dodson | Democratic | Lake City |
| 95 | Gail M. Buckner | Democratic | Jonesboro |
| 96 | Darryl Jordan | Democratic | Riverdale |
| 97 | Mike Barnes | Democratic | Hampton |
| 98 | Bill Hembree | Republican | Douglasville |
| 99 | Bob Snelling | Republican | Douglasville |
| 100 | Tracy Stallings | Democratic | Carrollton |
| 101 | Jack E. West | Democratic | Bowdon |
| 102 | Vance Smith Jr. | Republican | Pine Mountain |
| 103 | Lynn Ratigan Smith | Republican | Newnan |
| 104 | Lynn Westmoreland | Republican | Newnan |
| 105 | Kathy Cox | Republican | Peachtree City |
| 106 | John P. Yates | Republican | Griffin |
| 107 | Bill Sanders | Republican | Griffin |
| 108 | Steve Cash | Republican | McDonough |
| 109 | John Lunsford | Republican | McDonough |
| 110 | Curtis S. Jenkins | Democratic | Forsyth |
| 111 | Mickey Channell | Democratic | Greensboro |
| 112 | Bill Jackson | Democratic | Appling |
| 113 | Ben L. Harbin | Republican | Evans |
| 114 | Sue Burmeister | Republican | Augusta |
| 115 | Jack Connell | Democratic | Augusta |
| 116 | Alberta J. Anderson | Democratic | Waynesboro |
| 117 | Ben Allen | Democratic | Augusta |
| 118 | Henry Howard | Democratic | Augusta |
| 119 | George L. DeLoach | Republican | Hephzibah |
| 120 | Sistie Hudson | Democratic | Sparta |
| 121 | Jimmy Lord | Democratic | Sandersville |
| 122 | Bobby Eugene Parham | Democratic | Milledgeville |
| 123 | Ken Birdsong | Democratic | Gordon |
| 124 | David E. Lucas Sr. | Democratic | Macon |
| 125 | David B. Graves | Republican | Macon |
| 126 | Robert Reichert | Democratic | Macon |
| 127 | Nikki T. Randall | Democratic | Macon |
| 128 | Robert Ray | Democratic | Fort Valley |
| 129 | Mack Crawford | Republican | Zebulon |
| 130 | Jeff Brown | Republican | LaGrange |
| 131 | Carl Von Epps | Democratic | LaGrange |
| 132 | Danae Roberts | Republican | Columbus |
| 133 | Carolyn Flemming Hugley | Democratic | Columbus |
| 134 | Maretta Mitchell Taylor | Democratic | Columbus |
| 135 | Tom Buck | Democratic | Columbus |
| 136 | Calvin Smyre | Democratic | Columbus |
| 137 | Jimmy Skipper | Democratic | Americus |
| 138 | Johnny W. Floyd | Democratic | Cordele |
| 139 | Larry O'Neal | Republican | Warner Robins |
| 140 | Lynmore James | Democratic | Montezuma |
| 141 | Larry Walker | Democratic | Perry |
| 142 | Terry Coleman | Democratic | Eastman |
| 143 | DuBose Porter | Democratic | Dublin |
| 144 | Larry "Butch" Parrish | Democratic | Swainsboro |
| 145 | Craig W. Lanier | Republican | Stateboro |
| 146 | Bob Lane | Democratic | Stateboro |
| 147 | Ann R. Purcell | Democratic | Rincon |
| 148 | Lester Jackson | Democratic | Savannah |
| 149 | Dorothy B. Pelote | Democratic | Savannah |
| 150 | Ron Stephens | Republican | Garden City |
| 151 | Tom Bordeaux | Democratic | Savannah |
| 152 | Anne Mueller | Republican | Savannah |
| 153 | Burke Day | Republican | Tybee Island |
| 154 | Terry E. Barnard | Republican | Glennville |
| 155 | Greg Morris | Democratic | Vidalia |
| 156 | Newt Hudson | Democratic | Rochelle |
| 157 | Ray Holland | Democratic | Ashburn |
| 158 | Gerald E. Greene | Democratic | Cuthbert |
| 159 | Bob Hanner | Democratic | Parrott |
| 160 | Hugh D. Bloome | Democratic | Donalsonville |
| 161 | Winfred J. Dukes | Democratic | Albany |
| 162 | Lawrence R. Robers | Democratic | Albany |
| 163 | Doug Everett | Republican | Albany |
| 164 | A. Richard Royal | Democratic | Camilla |
| 165 | Austin Scott | Republican | Tifton |
| 166 | Penny Houston | Democratic | Nashville |
| 167 | Chuck Sims | Democratic | Douglas |
| 168 | Mike Boggs | Democratic | Waycross |
| 169 | Tommy Smith | Democratic | Nicholls |
| 170 | Roger Byrd | Democratic | Hazlehurst |
| 171 | Hinson Mosley | Democratic | Jesup |
| 172 | Buddy DeLoach | Independent | Hinesville |
| 173 | E. C. Tillman | Democratic | Brunswick |
| 174 | Jerry Keen | Republican | St. Simons Island |
| 175 | Charlie Smith Jr. | Democratic | St. Marys |
| 176 | Jay Shaw | Democratic | Lakeland |
| 177 | Ron Borders | Democratic | Valdosta |
| 178 | Ellis Black | Democratic | Valdosta |
| 179 | Wallace Sholar | Democratic | Cairo |
| 180 | John Bulloch | Republican | Ochlocknee |

- Steve Stancil resigned in December 2001 to run for the position of Lt. Governor. A special election was held to fill the vacant seat. On February 12, 2002, Diane Z, Grasse won the special runoff election.

== Legislation considered ==
- Created Metropolitan North Georgia Water Planning District in 2001

== See also ==
- List of Georgia state legislatures
