= 147th Georgia General Assembly =

Term of state legislature in US state of Georgia

←	146th	148th	→
- Great Seal of the State of Georgia

Overview
- Legislative body: Georgia General Assembly
- Meeting place: Georgia State Capitol

Senate
- Members: 56 (30 R, 26 D)
- President of the Senate: Mark Taylor (D)
- Party control: Republican Party

House of Representatives
- Members: 180 (107 D, 72 R, 1 I)
- Speaker of the House: Terry Coleman (D)
- Party control: Democratic Party

The 2003 regular session of the 147th General Assembly of the U.S. state of Georgia met from January 13, 2003, at 10:00 am, to Friday, April 25, at midnight, when both houses adjourned sine die. Control of the General Assembly was split between the Republican-controlled Senate and the Democratic-controlled House.

This was the longest legislative session in more than a century. 122 general House bills, 174 local House bills, 77 general Senate bills and 41 local Senate bills passed both chambers of the legislature and were sent to the governor for his signature.

The 2004 regular session of the Georgia General Assembly opened at 10:00 am on Monday, January 12, 2004, and adjourned sine die at midnight on Wednesday, April 7, 2004. The legislature passed 138 general House bills, 160 local House bills, 71 general Senate bills and 25 local Senate bills, which were sent to the governor for his signature.

In addition, Governor Sonny Perdue called for a special session, which met from May 3, 2004, to May 7, 2004, to handle the unbalanced budget that had been passed at the end of the regular session.

== Officers ==
=== Senate ===
==== Presiding Officer ====
Position	Name	Party	District
President	Mark Taylor	Democrat	n/a
President Pro Tempore	Eric Johnson	Republican	1

==== Majority leadership ====
Position	Name	District
Senate Majority Leader	Tom Price	61
Majority Caucus Chairman	Don Balfour	9
Majority Whip	Mitch Seabaugh	28

==== Minority leadership ====
Position	Name	District
Senate Minority Leader	Michael Meyer von Bremen	12
Minority Caucus Chairman	Steve Thompson	33
Minority Whip	Robert Brown	26

=== House of Representatives ===
==== Presiding Officer ====
Position	Name	Party	District
Speaker of the House	Terry Coleman	Democrat	118
Speaker Pro Tempore	DuBose Porter	Democrat	119

==== Majority leadership ====
Position	Name	District
House Majority Leader	Jimmy Skipper	116
Majority Whip	Nan Grogan Orrock	51
Majority Caucus Chairman	Calvin Smyre	111
Majority Caucus Vice Chairman	Jay Shaw	143
Majority Caucus Secretary	LaNett Stanley-Turner	43, Post 2
Majority Caucus Treasurer	Kathy Ashe	42, Post 2

==== Minority Leadership ====
Position	Name	District
House Minority Leader	Glenn Richardson	26
Minority Whip	Jerry Keen	146
Minority Caucus Chairman	Sharon Cooper	30
Minority Caucus Vice Chairman	Warren Massey	24
Minority Caucus Secretary	Sue Burmeister	96

== Members of the Georgia State Senate, 2003–2004 ==
District	Senator	Party	Residence
1	Eric Johnson	Republican	Savannah
2	Regina Thomas	Democratic	Savannah
3	Rene 'D. Kemp	Democratic	Hinesville
4	Jack Hill	Republican	Reidsville
5	Mary Hodges Squire	Democratic	Norcross
6	Ginger Collins	Republican	Atlanta
7	Peg Blitch	Democratic	Homerville
8	Tim Golden	Democratic	Valdosta
9	Don Balfour	Republican	Snellville
10	Nadine Thomas	Democratic	Decatur
11	John Bulloch	Republican	Ochlocknee
12	Michael S. Meyer von Bremen	Democratic	Albany
13	Rooney L. Bowen	Republican	Cordele
14	George Hooks	Democratic	Americus
15	Ed Harbison	Democratic	Columbus
16	Seth Harp	Republican	Midland
17	Mike Crotts	Republican	Atlanta
18	Ross Tolleson	Republican	Perry
19	Tommie Williams	Republican	Lyons
20	Hugh Gillis	Democratic	Soperton
21	Robert LaMutt	Republican	Marietta
22	James Randal Hall	Republican	Augusta
23	Don Cheeks	Republican	Augusta
24	Joey Brush	Republican	Martinez
25	Faye Smith	Democratic	Milledgeville
26	Robert Brown	Democratic	Macon
27	Dan Moody	Republican	Alpharetta
28	Mitch Seabaugh	Republican	Sharpsburg
29	Daniel W. Lee	Republican	LaGrange
30	Bill Hamrick	Republican	Carrollton
31	Nathan Dean	Democratic	Rockmart
32	Charlie Tanksley	Republican	Marietta
33	Steve Thompson	Democratic	Marietta
34	Valencia Seay	Democratic	Riverdale
35	Kasim Reed	Democratic	Atlanta
36	Sam Zamarripa	Democratic	Atlanta
37	Chuck Clay	Republican	Marietta
38	Horacena Tate	Democratic	Atlanta
39	Vincent D. Fort	Democratic	Atlanta
40	Liane Levetan	Democratic	Atlanta
41	Steve Henson	Democratic	Tucker
42	David Adelman	Democratic	Decatur
43	Connie Stokes	Democratic	Decatur
44	Terrell Starr	Democratic	Jonesboro
45	Renee S. Unterman	Republican	Buford
46	Brian P. Kemp	Republican	Athens
47	Ralph T. Hudgens	Republican	Comer
48	David J. Shafer	Republican	Duluth
49	Casey Cagle	Republican	Chestnut Mountain
50	Carol Jackson	Democratic	Cleveland
51	Bill Stephens	Republican	Canton
52	Preston W. Smith	Republican	Rome
53	Jeff E. Mullis	Republican	Chickamauga
54	Don R. Thomas	Republican	Dalton
55	Gloria Butler	Democratic	Stone Mountain
56	Tom Price	Republican	Roswell

== Members of the Georgia State House of Representatives, 2003–2004 ==
District	Representative	Party	Residence
1	Mike Snow	Democratic	Chickamauga
2	Brian Joyce	Republican	Lookout Mountain
3, Post 1	Ronald L. Forster	Republican	Ringgold
3, Post 2	Jack White	Republican	Blue Ridge
4	Roger Williams	Republican	Dalton
5	S. Craig Brock	Republican	Chatsworth
6	David Ralston	Republican	Blue Ridge
7	Benjamin Bridges	Republican	Cleveland
8	Charles F. Jenkins	Democratic	Blairsville
9	Amos Amerson	Republican	Dahlonega
10	Tom Graves	Republican	Fairmount
11	Barbara Massey Reece	Democratic	Menlo
12	Jeff Lewis	Republican	White
13, Post 1	Buddy Childers	Democratic	Rome
13, Post 2	Paul E. Smith	Democratic	Rome
14, Post 1	Tom Knox	Republican	Cumming
14, Post 2	Jack Murphy	Republican	Cumming
15	Chip Rogers	Republican	Woodstock
16	Calvin Hill	Republican	Canton
17	Bobby Franklin	Republican	Marietta
18	Bill Heath	Republican	Bremen
19	Bill Cummings	Democratic	Rockmart
20	Carl Rogers	Democratic	Gainesville
21	Stacey G. Reece	Republican	Gainesville
22	Jeanette Jamieson	Democratic	Toccoa
23	Alan Powell	Democratic	Hartwell
24	Warren Massey	Republican	Winder
25	Chris Elrod	Republican	Jefferson
26	Glenn Richardson	Republican	Dallas
27	Howard Richard Maxwell	Republican	Dallas
28	Earl Ehrhart	Republican	Powder Springs
29	Don Parsons	Republican	Marietta
30	Sharon Cooper	Republican	Marietta
31	Matt Dollar	Republican	Marietta
32	Judy Manning	Republican	Marietta
33, Post 1	Don Wix	Democratic	Mableton
33, Post 2	Alisha Thomas Morgan	Democratic	Austell
33, Post 3	Pat Dooley	Democratic	Marietta
34, Post 1	Doug Stoner	Democratic	Smyrna
34, Post 2	Rob Teilhet	Democratic	Smyrna
34, Post 3	Rich Golick	Republican	Smyrna
35	Roger Hines	Republican	Kennesaw
36	Mark Burkhalter	Republican	Alpharetta
37	Chuck Martin	Republican	Alphretta
38	Jan Jones	Republican	Alpharetta
39	Tom Campbell	Republican	Roswell
40	Wendell Willard	Republican	Atlanta
41	Joe Wilkinson	Republican	Sandy Springs
42, Post 1	Doug Teper	Democratic	Atlanta
42, Post 2	Kathy Ashe	Democratic	Atlanta
42, Post 3	Pat Gardner	Democratic	Atlanta
42, Post 4	Nick Moraitakis	Democratic	Atlanta
43, Post 1	"Able" Mable Thomas	Democratic	Atlanta
43, Post 2	LaNett Stanley-Turner	Democratic	Atlanta
44	John Noel	Democratic	Atlanta
45	Roger B. Bruce	Democratic	Atlanta
46	Bill Hembree	Republican	Douglasville
47	Tyrone L. Brooks Sr.	Democratic	Atlanta
48, Post 1	Robert A. "Bob" Holmes	Democratic	Atlanta
48, Post 2	Sharon Beasley-Teague	Democratic	Red Oak
48, Post 3	Joe Heckstall	Democratic	East Point
48, Post 4	Virgil Fludd	Democratic	Fayetteville
49	Douglas C. Dean	Democratic	Atlanta
50	Georganna T. Sinkfield	Democratic	Atlanta
51	Nan Grogan Orrock	Democratic	Atlanta
52	Fran Millar	Republican	Dunwoody
53	Jill Chambers	Republican	Atlanta
54	Sally Harrell	Democratic	Atlanta
55	Michele D. Henson	Democratic	Stone Mountain
56, Post 1	Stephanie Stuckey Benfield	Democratic	Atlanta
56, Post 2	Mary Margaret Oliver	Democratic	Decatur
57	Karla Drenner	Democratic	Avondale Estates
58	Barbara J. Mobley	Democratic	Decatur
59, Post 1	JoAnn McClinton	Democratic	Atlanta
59, Post 2	George Maddox	Democratic	Decatur
59, Post 3	Howard Mosby	Democratic	Atlanta
60, Post 1	Pam Stephenson	Democratic	Atlanta
60, Post 2	Stan Watson	Democratic	Decatur
60, Post 3	Teresa Greene-Johnson	Democratic	Lithonia
61, Post 1	Ron Sailor Jr.	Democratic	Decatur
61, Post 2	Earnest "Coach" Williams	Democratic	Avondale Estates
61, Post 3	Billy Mitchell	Democratic	Stone Mountain
62	Randal Mangham	Democratic	Decatur
63	Barbara J. Bunn	Republican	Conyers
64	Tom Rice	Republican	Norcross
65	Brooks P. Coleman Jr.	Republican	Duluth
66	Pedro Rafael Marin	Democratic	Duluth
67, Post 1	Mike Coan	Republican	Lawrenceville
67, Post 2	James Mills	Republican	Gainesville
68	David Casas	Republican	Lilburn
69, Post 1	Curt Blackburn Thompson II	Democratic	Norcross
69, Post 2	Hugh Floyd	Democratic	Norcross
70, Post 1	Charles E. Bannister	Republican	Lilburn
70, Post 2	Scott Dix	Republican	Lilburn
70, Post 3	John Wilson Heard	Republican	Lawrenceville
71, Post 1	Len Walker	Republican	Loganville
71, Post 2	Donna Sheldon	Republican	Dacula
72	Jim Stokes	Democratic	Covington
73	John F. Douglas	Republican	Covington
74	Louise McBee	Democratic	Athens
75	Keith Heard	Democratic	Athens
76	Bob Smith	Republican	Watkinsville
77	Mickey Channell	Democratic	Greensboro
78	Tom McCall	Democratic	Elberton
79	Barry A. Fleming	Republican	Harlem
80	Ben L. Harbin	Republican	Evans
81	Victor Hill	Democratic	Riverdale
82	Gail M. Buckner	Democratic	Jonesboro
83	Darryl Jordan	Democratic	Riverdale
84, Post 1	Ron Dodson	Democratic	Lake City
84, Post 2	Mike Barnes	Democratic	Hampton
85, Post 1	John P. Yates	Republican	Griffin
85, Post 2	John Lunsford	Republican	McDonough
86	Lynn Westmoreland	Republican	Newnan
87	Lynn Ratigan Smith	Republican	Newnan
88, Post 1	Mark Butler	Republican	Carrollton
88, Post 2	Chuck Harper	Republican	Carrollton
89	Jeff Brown	Republican	LaGrange
90	Carl Von Epps	Democratic	LaGrange
91	Mack Crawford	Republican	Zebulon
92	Lee Howell	Democratic	Griffin
93	Curtis S. Jenkins	Democratic	Forsyth
94	Bobby Eugene Parham	Democratic	Milledgeville
95	Sistie Hudson	Democratic	Sparta
96	Sue Burmeister	Republican	Augusta
97	Quincy Murphy	Democratic	Augusta
98	Henry Howard	Democratic	Augusta
99	Pete Warren	Democratic	Augusta
100	Alberta J. Anderson	Democratic	Waynesboro
101	Bob Lane	Democratic	Stateboro
102	Larry "Butch" Parrish	Democratic	Swainsboro
103	Jimmy Lord	Democratic	Sandersville
104	Ken Birdsong	Democratic	Gordon
105	David E. Lucas Sr.	Democratic	Macon
106	David B. Graves	Republican	Macon
107	Nikki T. Randall	Democratic	Macon
108	Robert Ray	Democratic	Fort Valley
109	Debbie Buckner	Democratic	Junction City
110	Vance Smith Jr.	Republican	Pine Mountain
111	Calvin Smyre	Democratic	Columbus
112	Tom Buck	Democratic	Columbus
113	Carolyn Flemming Hugley	Democratic	Columbus
114	Lynmore James	Democratic	Montezuma
115	Larry Walker	Democratic	Perry
116	Jimmy Skipper	Democratic	Americus
117	Larry O'Neal	Republican	Warner Robins
118	Terry Coleman	Democratic	Eastman
119	DuBose Porter	Democratic	Dublin
120	Greg Morris	Democratic	Vidalia
121, Post 1	Terry E. Barnard	Republican	Glennville
121, Post 2	Bert Smith Oliver	Democratic	Glennville
122	Ann R. Purcell	Democratic	Rincon
123	Ron Stephens	Republican	Garden City
124, Post 1	Lester Jackson	Democratic	Savannah
124, Post 2	Edward "Mickey" Stephens	Democratic	Savannah
125	Tom Bordeaux	Democratic	Savannah
126	Burke Day	Republican	Tybee Island
127	Buddy DeLoach	Independent	Hinesville
128	Al Williams	Democratic	Midway
129, Post 1	Hinson Mosley	Democratic	Jesup
129, Post 2	Tommy Smith	Democratic	Nicholls
130	Chuck Sims	Democratic	Douglas
131	Jay Roberts	Republican	Ocilla
132	Johnny W. Floyd	Democratic	Cordele
133	Bob Hanner	Democratic	Parrott
134	Gerald E. Greene	Democratic	Cuthbert
135	Lawrence R. Robers	Democratic	Albany
136	Winfred J. Dukes	Democratic	Albany
137	Ed Rynders	Republican	Albany
138	Austin Scott	Republican	Tifton
139	Penny Houston	Democratic	Nashville
140	A. Richard Royal	Democratic	Camilla
141, Post 1	Wallace Sholar	Democratic	Cairo
141, Post 2	Hugh D. Bloome	Democratic	Donalsonville
142	Ron Borders	Democratic	Valdosta
143	Jay Shaw	Democratic	Lakeland
144	Ellis Black	Democratic	Valdosta
145	Mike Boggs	Democratic	Waycross
146	Jerry Keen	Republican	St. Simons Island
147	Cecily A. Hill	Republican	St. Marys

== See also ==
- List of Georgia state legislatures
