= Georgia Legislative Black Caucus =

The Georgia Legislative Black Caucus is the caucus of African-American members of the Georgia General Assembly. It was established in 1975, and is currently the largest caucus of black state legislators in the country in terms of members. Members have included Julian Bond who opposed the Vietnam War.

== History ==
Prior to the election of Senator Leroy Johnson, fifty-eight black legislators served in the General Assembly from 1868, when the first 33 African-American members were elected, to 1907, when W. H. Rogers resigned. From 1907 to 1962, African-Americans were effectively barred from voting or running in state elections by poll taxes and literacy tests; until 1946, African-Americans were prohibited from participating in the white primaries ran by the Democratic Party of Georgia. However, the impact of the court cases King v. Chapman, Gray v. Sanders, and Wesberry v. Sanders as well as passage of the Civil Rights Act of 1964 and Voting Rights Act of 1965 had opened voter registration to blacks resulted in the election of Senator Johnson (1962) as well as the election of the first eight black House members since 1907 in 1965: six from Atlanta (William Alexander, Julian Bond, Benjamin Brown, Julius C. Daugherty, J. D. Grier, and Grace Towns Hamilton) and one each from Columbus (Albert Thompson) and Augusta (Richard Dent). By 1972, fourteen African-American members were serving in the General Assembly when Johnson began convening informal gatherings of the black legislators to discuss issues of importance to African-American members. In 1975, the Georgia Legislative Black Caucus was formally incorporated and first chaired by Rep. Benjamin Brown.

== Chairs ==
- Rep. Benjamin Brown (1973-1976)
- Rep. Bobby Hill (1976-1979)
- Rep. Calvin Smyre (1979-1980)
- Rep. William Randall (1980-1982)
- Senator Al Scott (1982-1984)
- Rep. Sanford Bishop
- Senator Charles Walker
- Rep. Bob Holmes
- Rep. Mike Thurmond
- Rep. Georganna Sinkfield
- Sen. Diana Harvey Johnson
- Rep. Carl Von Epps Jr.
- Senator Ed Harbison
- Rep. Stan Watson
- Rep. Al Williams
- Senator Emanuel Jones
- Rep. Dee Dawkins-Haigler
- Senator Lester G. Jackson
- Rep. Karen Bennett (politician)
- Senator Tonya Anderson
- Rep. Carl Gilliard
- Senator Nikki Merritt
