= List of Georgia state legislatures =

The General Assembly, the legislature of the U.S. state of Georgia, has convened many times since statehood became effective on January 2, 1778.

== Legislatures ==
Number	Name	Start date	End date	Session details	Last election
Georgia Constitution of 1777
1	1st Georgia General Assembly	1777		May 8, 1777 – June 17, 1777 ??? -September 16, 1777	
2	2nd Georgia General Assembly	1778		January 6, 1778 – March 1, 1778; May 2—?, 1778; October 30— November 15, 1778	
3	3rd Georgia General Assembly	1779		January 5, 1779-? July ?—July 24, 1779; Nov. 4(?)- ?, 1779	
4	4th Georgia General Assembly	1780		January 4, 1780 - February 5, 1780	
5	5th Georgia General Assembly	1781		August 17, 1781 - August 22, 1781	
6	6th Georgia General Assembly	1782		January 1, 1782 - January 12, 1782; Apr. 17-May 4 July 3—July 4, Ann. Adj. July 13—Aug. 5, Adj. October 15- October 21, 1782	
7	7th Georgia General Assembly	1783		January 1, 1783 - Feb. 18. May 1—May 6, Ex. May 15—June 14, Ann. Adj. July 1—Aug. 1 1783, Ex.	
8	8th Georgia General Assembly	1784		Jan. 6 - Feb. 26, 1784; July 5—July 13, 1784 Adj. Oct. 6—Oct. 14, 1784, Adj.	
9	9th Georgia General Assembly	1785		Jan. 4, 1785 - Feb. 22, 1785	
10	10th Georgia General Assembly	1786		Jan. 3—Feb. 14, 1786; July 17—Aug. 15, 1786	
11	11th Georgia General Assembly	1787		Jan. 2—Feb. 11, 1787; July 3—Oct. 31, 1787	
12	12th Georgia General Assembly	1788		Jan. 1—Feb. 1, 1788; July 22—Aug. 6, 1788, Ex; Nov. 4—Nov. 13, 1788	
13	13th Georgia General Assembly	1789		January 6, 1789 - February 4, 1789	
Georgia Constitution of 1789
14	14th Georgia General Assembly	1789		Nov. 2—Dec. 24, 1789; June 7–11, 1790, Ex.	
15	15th Georgia General Assembly	1790		Nov. 1, 1790 - Dec. 11, 1790	
16	16th Georgia General Assembly	1791		Nov. 7, 1791 - Dec. 24, 1791	
17	17th Georgia General Assembly	1792		Nov. 5—Dec. 20 (?), 1792	
18	18th Georgia General Assembly	1793		Nov. 4-Dec. 20, 1793	
19	19th Georgia General Assembly	1794		Nov. 3, 1794— Jan. 8, 1795	
20	20th Georgia General Assembly	1795		Jan. 12—Feb. 22, 1796	
21	21st Georgia General Assembly	1796		Jan. 10—Feb. 11, 1797	
22	22nd Georgia General Assembly	1797		Jan. 9—Feb. 3, 1798	
Georgia Constitution of 1798
23	23rd Georgia General Assembly	1798		Jan. 8—Feb. 18, 1799	
24	24th Georgia General Assembly	1799		Nov. 4—Dec. 6, 1799	
25	25th Georgia General Assembly	1800		Nov. 3—Dec. 2, 1800	
26	26th Georgia General Assembly	1801		Nov. 2—Dec. 5, 1801; June 10—June 16, 1802 (Ex)	
27	27th Georgia General Assembly	1802		Nov. 1—Nov. 27, 1802; Apr. 18—May 11, 1803 (Ex.)	
28	28th Georgia General Assembly	1803		Nov. 8—Dec. 11, 1803; May 14—May 19, 1804 (Ex)	
29	29th Georgia General Assembly	1804		Nov. 5—Dec. 13, 1804	
30	30th Georgia General Assembly	1805		Nov. 4—Dec. 7, 1805; June 9—June 26, 1806 Ex.	
31	31st Georgia General Assembly	1806		Nov. 3—Dec. 6., 1806	
32	32nd Georgia General Assembly	1807		Nov. 2—Dec. 10, 1807; May 9—May 22, 1808 (Ex)	
33	33rd Georgia General Assembly	1808		Nov. 7—Dec. 21, 1808	
34	34th Georgia General Assembly	1809		Nov. 6—Dec. 14, 1809	
35	35th Georgia General Assembly	1810		Nov. 5—Dec. 14, 1810	
36	36th Georgia General Assembly	1811		Nov. 4—Dec. 14, 1811	
37	37th Georgia General Assembly	1812		Nov. 2—Dec. 10, 1812	
38	38th Georgia General Assembly	1813		Nov. 1—Dec. 4, 1813	
39	39th Georgia General Assembly	1814		Oct. 17—Nov. 23, 1814	
40	40th Georgia General Assembly	1815		Nov. 6—Dec. 16, 1815	
41	41st Georgia General Assembly	1816		Nov. 4—Dec. 18, 1816	
42	42nd Georgia General Assembly	1817		Nov. 3—Dec. 20, 1817	
43	43rd Georgia General Assembly	1818		Nov. 2—Dec. 19, 1818	
44	44th Georgia General Assembly	1819		Nov. 1—Dec. 20, 1819	
45	45th Georgia General Assembly	1820		Nov. 6—Dec. 20, 1820; Apr. 30—May 15, 1821 Ex.	
46	46th Georgia General Assembly	1821		Nov. 5—Dec. 22, 1821	
47	47th Georgia General Assembly	1822		Nov. 4—Dec. 24, 1822	
48	48th Georgia General Assembly	1823		Nov. 3—Dec. 20, 1823	
49	49th Georgia General Assembly	1824		Nov. 1—Dec. 18, 1824; May 23—June 11, 1825 Ex	
50	50th Georgia General Assembly	1825		Nov. 7—Dec. 22, 1825	
51	51st Georgia General Assembly	1826		Nov. 6—Dec. 22, 1826	
52	52nd Georgia General Assembly	1827		Nov. 5—Dec. 24, 1827	
53	53rd Georgia General Assembly	1828		Nov. 3—Dec. 20, 1828	
54	54th Georgia General Assembly	1829		Nov. 2—Dec. 21, 1829	
55	55th Georgia General Assembly	1830		Oct. 18—Dec. 23, 1830	
56	56th Georgia General Assembly	1831		Nov. 7—Dec. 24, 1831	
57	57th Georgia General Assembly	1832		Nov. 5—Dec. 22, 1832	
58	58th Georgia General Assembly	1833		Nov. 4—Dec. 21, 1833	
59	59th Georgia General Assembly	1834		Nov. 3—Dec. 20, 1834	
60	60th Georgia General Assembly	1835		Nov. 2—Dec. 22, 1835	
61	61st Georgia General Assembly	1836		Nov. 7-Dec. 24, 1836	
62	62nd Georgia General Assembly	1837		Nov. 6—Dec. 25, 1837	
63	63rd Georgia General Assembly	1838		Nov. 5—Dec. 29, 1838	
64	64th Georgia General Assembly	1839		Nov. 4—Dec. 21, 1839	
65	65th Georgia General Assembly	1840		Nov. 2—Dec. 23, 1840	
66	66th Georgia General Assembly	1841		Nov. 1—Dec. 9, 1841	
67	67th Georgia General Assembly	1842		Nov. 7—Dec. 27, 1842	
68	68th Georgia General Assembly	1843		Nov. 6—Dec. 23, 1843	
69	69th Georgia General Assembly	1845		Nov. 3—Dec. 24, 1845	
70	70th Georgia General Assembly	1847		Nov. 1—Dec. 30, 1847	
71	71st Georgia General Assembly	1849		Nov. 5—Dec. 20, 1849; Jan. 14—Feb. 23, 1850	
72	72nd Georgia General Assembly	1851		Nov. 3—Dec. 22, 1851; Dec. 26—Jan. 22, 1852	
73	73rd Georgia General Assembly	1853		Nov. 7—Dec. 21, 1853; Jan. 9—Feb. 17, 1854	
74	74th Georgia General Assembly	1855		Nov. 5—Dec. 20, 1855; Jan. 14—Mar. 1, 1856	
75	75th Georgia General Assembly	1857		Nov. 4—Dec. 22, 1857; Nov. 3—Dec. 11, 1858	
76	76th Georgia General Assembly	1859		Nov. 2—Dec. 16, 1859; Nov. 7—Dec. 19, 1860	
Georgia Constitution of 1861
77	77th Georgia General Assembly	1861		Nov. 6—Dec. 14, 1861; Nov. 6—Dec. 13, 1862; Mar. 25—Apr. 18, 1863 Ex.	
78	78th Georgia General Assembly	1863		Nov. 5—Dec. 14, 1863; Mar. 10—Mar. 19, 1864 Ex. Nov. 3—Nov. 18, 1864; Feb. 15—Mar. 11, 1865 Ex.	
Georgia Constitution of 1865
79	79th Georgia General Assembly	1865		Dec. 4—Dec. 15, 1865; Jan. 15—Mar. 13, 1866; Nov. 6—Dec. 14, 1866	
Georgia Constitution of 1868
80	80th Georgia General Assembly	1868		July 4—Oct. 6, 1868 Ex. Jan. 13—Mar. 18, 1869; Jan. 10—Oct. 25, 1870 Ex.	
81	81st Georgia General Assembly	1871		Nov. 1—Dec. 15, 1871; Jan 10—Jan 19, 1872; July 17—Aug. 24, 1872 Adj.	
82	82nd Georgia General Assembly	1873		Jan. 8—Feb. 18, 1873; Jan. 14—Feb. 26, 1874	
83	83rd Georgia General Assembly	1875		Jan. 13—Mar. 1, 1875; Jan. 12—Feb. 24, 1876	
84	84th Georgia General Assembly	1877		Jan. 10—Feb. 22, 1877	
Georgia Constitution of 1877
85	85th Georgia General Assembly	1878		Nov. 6—Dec. 13, 1878; July 2—Oct. 15, 1879 Adj.	
86	86th Georgia General Assembly	1880		Nov. 3—Dec. 4, 1880; July 6—Sept. 27, 1881 Adj.	
87	87th Georgia General Assembly	1882		Nov. 1—Dec. 8, 1882; May 9—May 10, 1883 Ex. July 4—Sept. 26, 1883 Ann. Adj.	
88	88th Georgia General Assembly	1884		Nov. 5—Dec. 20, 1884; July 8—Oct. 15, 1885 Adj.	
89	89th Georgia General Assembly	1886		Nov. 3—Dec. 22, 1886; July 6—Oct. 20, 1887 Adj.	
90	90th Georgia General Assembly	1888		Nov. 7—Dec. 22, 1888; July 3—Nov. 9, 1889 Adj	
91	91st Georgia General Assembly	1890		Nov. 5—Dec. 22, 1890; July 8—Oct. 15, 1891 Adj	October 1890
92	92nd Georgia General Assembly	1892		Oct. 26—Dec. 17, 1892; Oct. 25—Dec. 13, 1893	
93	93rd Georgia General Assembly	1894		Oct. 24—Dec. 12, 1894; Oct. 23—Dec. 11, 1895	
94	94th Georgia General Assembly	1896		Oct. 28—Dec. 19, 1896; Feb. 3—Feb. 3, 1897 Adj; Oct. 17—Dec. 16, 1897	
95	95th Georgia General Assembly	1898		Oct. 26—Oct. 17, 1898; Oct. 26—Dec. 16, 1899	
96	96th Georgia General Assembly	1900		Oct. 24—Dec. 15, 1900; Oct. 23—Dec. 13, 1901	
97	97th Georgia General Assembly	1902		Oct. 22—Dec. 12, 1902; June 24—Aug. 12, 1903; June 22—Aug. 11, 1904	
98	98th Georgia General Assembly	1905		June 28—Aug. 18, 1905; June 27—Aug. 15, 1906	
99	99th Georgia General Assembly	1907		June 26—Aug. 17, 1907; June 24—Aug. 12, 1908; Aug. 25—Sept. 19, 1908 Ex.	
100	100th Georgia General Assembly	1909		June 23—Aug. 11, 1909; June 22—Aug. 10, 1910	
101	101st Georgia General Assembly	1911		June 28—Aug. 17, 1911; Jan. 24—Jan. 25, 1912 Ex; June 26—Aug. 14, 1912	
102	102nd Georgia General Assembly	1913		June 25—Aug. 14, 1913; June 24—Aug. 12, 1914	
103	103rd Georgia General Assembly	1915		June 23—Aug. 11, 1915; Nov. 3—Nov. 25, 1915 Ex; June 28—Aug. 16, 1916; Mar. 20—Mar. 28, 1917 Ex	
104	104th Georgia General Assembly	1917		June 27—Aug. 15, 1917; June 26—Aug. 14, 1918	
105	105th Georgia General Assembly	1919		June 25—Aug. 13, 1919; June 23—Aug. 11, 1920	
106	106th Georgia General Assembly	1921		June 22—Aug. 10, 1921; June 28—Aug. 17, 1922	
107	107th Georgia General Assembly	1923		June 27—Aug. 15, 1923; Nov. 7—Dec. 14, 1924 Ex; June 25—Aug. 13, 1924	
108	108th Georgia General Assembly	1925		June 24-Aug. 22, 1925; Feb. 24—Mar. 18 1926 Ex. Mar. 19—Apr. 15, 1926 Ex.	
109	109th Georgia General Assembly	1927		June 22-August 20, 1927	
110	110th Georgia General Assembly	1929		June 26—Aug. 24, 1929; Jan. 6—Mar. 26, 1931 Ex.	
111	111th Georgia General Assembly	1931		June 24—Aug. 22, 1931	
112	112th Georgia General Assembly	1933		June 24—Aug. 22, 1933; Jan. 9—Jan. 18, 1933 Special	
113	113th Georgia General Assembly	1935		Jan. 14—Jan. 23, 1935; Jan. 24—Mar. 28, 1935	
114	114th Georgia General Assembly	1937		Jan. 11—Jan. 18, 1937; Jan. 25—Mar. 25, 1937; Nov. 22, 1937—Feb. 12, 1938, Ex.	
115	115th Georgia General Assembly	1939		Jan. 9—Jan. 18, 1939 (Ten days); Jan. 19—Mar. 18, 1939 (Regular)	
116	116th Georgia General Assembly	1941		Jan. 13—Jan. 22, 1941 (Ten days); Jan. 23—Mar. 22, 1941 Regular	
117	117th Georgia General Assembly	1942		Jan. 11—Jan. 15, 1943 (Special); Jan. 18—Mar. 18, 1943 (Regular); Sept. 27—Oct. 1, 1943 (Ex.); Jan. 3—Jan. 7, 1943 (Ex.)	
118	118th Georgia General Assembly	1944		Jan. 8—Mar. 3, 1945; May 29—June 1, 1945 Ex. Jan. 14—Jan. 28, 1946	
Georgia Constitution of 1945
119	119th Georgia General Assembly	1947		Jan. 13—Mar. 22, 1947; Sept. 27—Oct. 1, 1948 Ex. Nov. 16—Nov. 17, 1948 Ex.	
120	120th Georgia General Assembly	1949		Jan. 10—Feb. 19, 1949; July 18—July 28, 1949 Ex. Jan. 16—Feb. 13, 1950	
121	121st Georgia General Assembly	1951		Jan. 8—Feb. 16, 1951; Jan. 14—Feb. 14, 1952	
122	122nd Georgia General Assembly	1953		Jan. 12—Feb. 25, 1953; Nov. 16—Dec. 10, 1953	
123	123rd Georgia General Assembly	1955		Jan. 10—Feb. 18, 1955; June 6—June 17, 1955 (Ex); Jan. 9—Feb. 17, 1956	
124	124th Georgia General Assembly	1957		Jan. 14—Feb. 22, 1957; Jan. 13—Feb. 21, 1958	
125	125th Georgia General Assembly	1959		Jan. 12—Feb. 20, 1959; Jan. 11—Feb. 19, 1960	
126	126th Georgia General Assembly	1961		Jan. 9—Feb. 2, 1961; Feb. 20—Mar. 6, 1961; Jan. 8—Feb. 16, 1962; Apr. 16—Apr. 27, 1962 (Ex); Sept 27—Oct. 8, 1962 (2nd Ex)	
127	127th Georgia General Assembly	1963		Jan. 14–25, 1963; Feb. 11—Mar. 15, 1963; Jan. 13—Feb. 21, 1964; May 4—June 25, 1964	
128	128th Georgia General Assembly	1965		Jan. 11–22, 1965; Feb. 8—Mar. 12, 1965; Jan. 10—Feb. 18, 1966	
129	129th Georgia General Assembly	1967		Jan. 9-20, 1967; Feb. 13—Mar. 17, 1967; Jan. 8-19, 1968; Jan. 29—Feb. 16, 1968; Feb. 26—Mar. 2, 1968; Mar. 4–8, 1968	
130	130th Georgia General Assembly	1969		Jan. 13—Jan. 24, 1969; Feb. 10—Mar. 21, 1969; June 12—June 13, 1969; Jan. 12—Feb. 21, 1970	
131	131st Georgia General Assembly	1971		Jan. 11—Jan. 22, 1971; Feb. 8—Mar. 12, 1971; Sept. 24—Oct. 8, 1971; Jan. 10—Feb. 4, 1972; Feb. 21—Mar. 9, 1972	
132	132nd Georgia General Assembly	1973		Jan. 8—Jan. 19, 1973; Feb. 12—Mar. 16, 1973; Jan. 14—Feb. 22, 1974 (Recessed); Feb. 26, 1974 (Reconvened & Adjourned)	
133	133rd Georgia General Assembly	1975		Jan. 13-Jan. 24, 1975 (Recessed); Feb. 10-Mar. 3, 1975 Adj.; Mar. 7, 1975 Adj.; Mar. 10-Mar. 13, 1975 Adj.; Mar. 18-Mar. 21, 1975 Adj.; Mar. 24-Mar. 25, 1975 Adj. Sine Die; June 23-July 3, Adj. Spec. Sess. Jan. 12-Jan. 23, 1976 (Recessed); Feb. 2-Feb. 13, 1976; Feb. 16-Feb. 20; Feb. 23-Feb. 28, 1976; Mar. 1-Mar. 5, Adj. Sine Die	
Georgia Constitution of 1976
134	134th Georgia General Assembly	1977		Jan. 10–18, 1977; Jan. 31-March. 10, 1977; Jan. 9-20 1978; Feb. 6-March 7, 1978, Adj. Sine Die	
135	135th Georgia General Assembly	1979		January 8 - March 27, 1979; January 14 - March 8, 1980	
136	136th Georgia General Assembly	1981		January 12 - March 25, 1981; January 11 - March 26, 1982; August 3–8, 1982	
137	137th Georgia General Assembly	1983		January 10 - March 4, 1983; January 9 - February 29, 1984	
1983 Georgia Constitution
138	138th Georgia General Assembly	1985		January 14 - March 8, 1985; January 13 - March 7, 1986	
139	139th Georgia General Assembly	1987		January 12 - March 12, 1987; January 11 - March 7, 1988	
140	140th Georgia General Assembly	1989		January 9 - March 15, 1989; January 8 - March 9, 1990	
141	141st Georgia General Assembly	1991		January 14 - March 15, 1991; August 9 - September 15, 1991; January 11 - March 31, 1992	
142	142nd Georgia General Assembly	1993		January 11 - March 23, 1993; January 10 - March 16, 1994	
143	143rd Georgia General Assembly	1995		January 9 -March 17, 1995; January 8, March 18, 1996	
144	144th Georgia General Assembly	1997		January 13 - March 28, 1997; January 12 - March 19, 1998	November 5, 1996
145	145th Georgia General Assembly	1999		January 11 - March 24, 1999; January 10 - March 22, 2000	
146	146th Georgia General Assembly	2001		January 8 - March 21, 2001; January 14 - April 12, 2002	
147	147th Georgia General Assembly	2003		January 13 - April 25, 2003; January 12 - May 7, 2004	
148	148th Georgia General Assembly	2005		January 10 - March 31, 2005; September 6–10, 2005; January 9 - March 30, 2006	
149	149th Georgia General Assembly	2007		January 8 - April 16, 2007; January 14 - April 4, 2008	
150	150th Georgia General Assembly	2009		January 12 - April 3, 2009; January 11 - April 29, 2010	
151	151st Georgia General Assembly	2011		January 10 - April 14, 2011; January 9 - March 29, 2012	November 2, 2010: House, Senate
152	152nd Georgia General Assembly	2013		January 14, 2013 – March 29, 2013; January 13, 2014 – March 21, 2014	November 6, 2012
153	153rd Georgia General Assembly	2015		January 12, 2015 - April 2, 2015; January 11, 2016 - March 24, 2016	November 4, 2014
154	154th Georgia General Assembly	2017		January 9, 2017 – March 30, 2017; January 8, 2018 – March 29, 2018	November 8, 2016: House, Senate
155	155th Georgia General Assembly	2019		January 14, 2019 – April 2, 2019; January 13, 2020 – June 26, 2020	November 6, 2018: House, Senate
156	156th Georgia General Assembly	2021		January 11, 2021 – March 31, 2021; January 10, 2022 – April 4, 2022	November 3, 2020: House, Senate
157	157th Georgia General Assembly	2023		January 9, 2023 – March 29, 2023; January 8, 2024 – April 28, 2024	November 8, 2022: House, Senate
158	158th Georgia General Assembly	2025		January 13, 2025 – April 4, 2025	November 5, 2024: House, Senate

== Constitutional Conventions ==
- Georgia Constitutional Convention of 1776
- Georgia Constitutional Convention of 1789
- Georgia Constitutional Convention of 1798
- Georgia Constitutional Convention of 1861
- Georgia Constitutional Convention of 1865
- Georgia Constitutional Convention of 1867–1868
- Georgia Constitutional Convention of 1877
- Georgia Constitutional Commission of 1945
- Select Committee on Constitutional Revision (1977-1981)

== See also ==
- List of speakers of the Georgia House of Representatives
- List of presidents of the Georgia State Senate
- List of governors of Georgia
- Constitution of Georgia (U.S. state)
- Politics of Georgia (U.S. state)
- Elections in Georgia (U.S. state)
- Georgia State Capitol
- Historical outline of the State of Georgia
- Lists of United States state legislative sessions
