= Alberta Anderson =

American politician

Member of the Georgia House of Representatives from the 123rd district
- In office 1997–2003
- Succeeded by: Gloria Frazier

Personal details
- Party: Democratic

Alberta Jacqueline Anderson is an American politician from Georgia.

== See also ==
- 148th Georgia General Assembly
- 147th Georgia General Assembly
- 146th Georgia General Assembly
- 145th Georgia General Assembly
- 144th Georgia General Assembly
