= Diana Harvey Johnson =

American politician and businesswoman

Member of the Georgia State Senate from the 2nd district
- In office January 9, 1995 – November 12, 1999
- Preceded by: Roy Allen
- Succeeded by: Regina Thomas

Member of the Georgia House of Representatives from the 148th district
- In office January 11, 1993 – January 9, 1995
- Succeeded by: Regina Thomas

Personal details
- Born: August 29, 1946 (age 79)
- Party: Democratic
- Education: Morris Brown College; University of Georgia

Diana Harvey Johnson (born August 29, 1946) is a businesswoman and former state legislator in Georgia. She served five terms in the Georgia House of Representatives and two terms in the Georgia Senate. She represented Savannah, Georgia. She was convicted of funneling state funds to non-profits that paid the money to her through her businesses.

She graduated from Morris Brown College and the University of Georgia. She is married to Herman T. Riley.

She appeared on C-SPAN in 1996 discussing state government.

== See also ==
- Georgia Legislative Black Caucus
- 145th Georgia General Assembly
- 144th Georgia General Assembly
