= Ralph L. Johnson =

Barbadian business executive

Ralph Lancelot Johnson
Personal information
- Born: 21 July 1939 Barbados
- Died: 27 May 2020 (aged 80) Barbados

Sailing career
- Sport: Sailing
- Club: Barbados Yacht Club

Ralph Lancelot Johnson GCM (July 21, 1939 – May 27, 2020) was a Barbadian business person and sportsman.

== Business career ==
Johnson was one of the founders of Harris Paints International ultimately becoming Chairman of the Company. Described as a pioneer exporter and manufacturer in Barbados he was still in the role of Chairman Emeritus at Harris Paints at the time of his death. He served as President of the Barbados Manufacturing Association in 1990-92.

== Sporting activities ==
Johnson was a President of the Barbados Yachting Association, the Barbados Squash Rackets Association, the Caribbean Area Squash Rackets Association and the Caribbean Yachting Association. He played basketball, football, water polo, and squash. He also participated in motor sport, water skiing, golf and represented Barbados in boxing competition. He served on the Barbados Olympic Association's (BOA) Board for 34 years, 28 of which were as Vice President. He was one of the primary architects in the establishment of a lottery for sports organizations to sustain the Barbados Olympic Association Inc. in its day to day operations. In 1997, he was awarded a Gold Crown of Merit by the government of Barbados for his contribution to business and sport. He was one of the founding members of the Barbados Squash Club and was its President in the late 1970's. As the owner and skipper of the yacht Rapajam he was in 2014 the holder of the 60 and Under Monohull Round Barbados Race Record. He won the CSA division of the Old Brigand Rum Regatta in 2016.
