= Mike Crotts =

American state legislator in Georgia

Michael Dean Crotts (March 19, 1947 - July 9, 2022) was a state legislator in the state of Georgia. He served 12 years in the Georgia Senate from 1992 to 2004. He advocated for a state ban on gay marriage that was later overturned by the United States Supreme Court. He wrote a book with his wife about a near death experience.

He was born in Atlanta, Georgia to Thurman Crotts, a WWII veteran, and Margaret Elizabeth Crotts.

He served in the Coast Guard.

He had a wife Phyllis and a son Calen. His book titled Dead for 34 Minutes: A True Story of Life After Death is about an out of body experience and his life.

== See also ==
- 142nd Georgia General Assembly
- 143rd Georgia General Assembly
- 144th Georgia General Assembly
- 145th Georgia General Assembly
- 146th Georgia General Assembly
- 147th Georgia General Assembly
