= Frank Bradford =

American lawyer and politician (1941–2022)

Frank Bradford (October 21, 1941 – February 2, 2022) was an American lawyer and politician.

Bradford was born in Sumter, South Carolina, and graduated from Sumter High School. He received his bachelor's degree in business administration management from University of South Carolina in 1965 and his law degree from University of South Carolina School of Law in 1968. He was admitted to the South Carolina and Georgia bars. Bradford practiced law in and lived in Smyrna, Georgia. He served in the Georgia House of Representatives from 1997 to 1999 and was a Republican. He died on February 2, 2022, at the age of 80, in Smyrna, Georgia.
