= Dan Ponder Jr. =

American politician

Member of the Georgia House of Representatives for the 160th district
- In office 1996–2000
- Preceded by: Cathy Cox

Personal details
- Born: September 13, 1954 (age 71)
- Party: Republican

Daniel E. Ponder Jr. (born September 13, 1954) is an American politician. He was a member of the Georgia House of Representatives from 1996 to 2000. He is a member of the Republican party. In 2003, he received the Profile in Courage Award from the John F. Kennedy Library Foundation. He was elected mayor of Donalsonville, Georgia in 2013.
