= George L. DeLoach =

American politician

Member of the Georgia House of Representatives
- In office 1995–2002

Personal details
- Born: December 25, 1940 (age 85) United States
- Party: Republican
- Profession: funeral director

George L. DeLoach (born December 25, 1940) is an American politician. He was a member of the Georgia House of Representatives from 1995 to 2003. He is a member of the Republican party.
