= Walter Ronnie Sailor Jr. =

American minister and politician from Georgia

Ron Sailor (born Walter Ron Sailor Jr.; c. 1975), also known as Walter Ronnie Sailor Jr., is a former State Representative in the Georgia General Assembly from the 93rd District. He represented parts of DeKalb and Rockdale counties from 2001 to 2006.

Sailor resigned his office in March 2008 after pleading guilty to charges of money laundering and attempted laundering of what he believed were proceeds from the sale of cocaine, but what was actually a government sting operation. He received a sentence of five years imprisonment. Sailor then tried to cover the crime by laundering $250,000 through false loans using as collateral property belonging to the Greater New Light Missionary Baptist Church of which he was the pastor. He was sentenced to five years and three months in federal prison.

Sailor Jr. is the son of the late African-American television and radio broadcast journalist, Walter Ron Sailor Sr.

== See also ==
- Jack Tarpley Camp Jr.
