= Stan Watson (politician) =

American politician

Stan Watson is a former politician in Georgia who served as a state representative and a county commissioner. He served in the Georgia General Assembly for 12 years representing DeKalb County.

He was convicted of theft following a guilty plea in 2017 over misusing funds.

In 2015, a jury awarded two women more than $150,000 over an incident at a bar in which Watson accused them of stealing his wallet.

== See also ==
- Georgia Legislative Black Caucus
