= Regina Thomas =

American politician

Member of the Georgia State Senate from the 2nd district
- In office January 18, 2000 – January 12, 2009
- Preceded by: Diana Harvey Johnson
- Succeeded by: Lester Jackson

Member of the Georgia House of Representatives from the 148th district
- In office January 9, 1995 – January 11, 1999
- Preceded by: Diana Harvey Johnson
- Succeeded by: Lester Jackson

Personal details
- Born: December 5, 1951 (age 74) Savannah, Georgia, U.S.
- Party: Democratic
- Spouse(s): Ervin J. Thomas, Sr.
- Education: Beach High School; Community College of Baltimore, Maryland
- Occupation: community volunteer

Regina Thomas (born December 5, 1951) is an American politician who served as a member of the Georgia House of Representatives from 1995 to 1999 and the Georgia State Senate from 2000 to 2009.

In the 2008 election, Thomas sought election to the U.S. House of Representatives from Georgia's 12th congressional district, running in the Democratic primary against the incumbent, John Barrow. She lost her challenge to Barrow by approximately 50 percentage points. She ran again in 2010, and, after losing the Democratic nomination by 15 points, planned to run as a write-in candidate in the general election, but in August 2010 the office of the Secretary of State of Georgia ruled that she was ineligible to do so.

In January 2019, Thomas announced that she planned to run for Mayor of Savannah, Georgia in that year's election. Thomas received 13.5% of the vote in the first round and was eliminated.
