= Tom Bordeaux =

American politician (born 1954)

Thomas Bordeaux Jr.
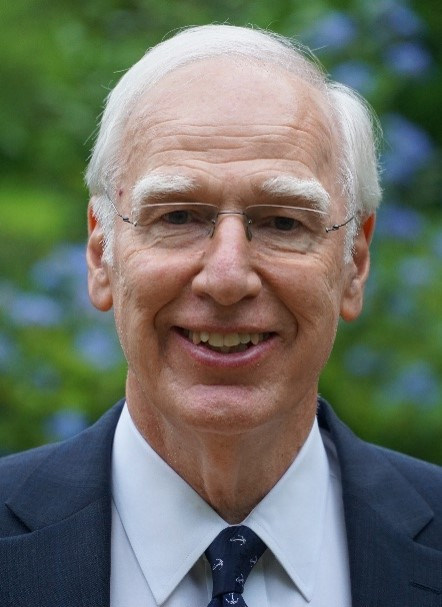
- Bordeaux in 2021

Member of the Georgia House of Representatives from the 162nd district
- In office January 10, 2005 – January 8, 2007
- Preceded by: Lawrence R. Roberts
- Succeeded by: J. Craig Gordon

Member of the Georgia House of Representatives from the 125th district
- In office January 13, 2003 – January 10, 2005
- Preceded by: David Graves
- Succeeded by: Jim Cole

Member of the Georgia House of Representatives from the 151st district
- In office January 14, 1991 – January 13, 2003
- Preceded by: Harry D. Dixon
- Succeeded by: Freddie Sims

Judge of the Chatham County Probate Court
- In office January 1, 2017 – Present
- Preceded by: Harris Lewis

Personal details
- Born: February 19, 1954 (age 72) Savannah, Georgia, US
- Party: Democratic
- Spouse: Nelle Bordeaux
- Children: 2
- Education: University of Georgia (AB, JD)

Thomas C. Bordeaux Jr. (born February 19, 1954) is an American judge, attorney, and politician who served in the Georgia House of Representatives from 1991 to 2007.

== Early life and education ==
Bordeaux was born in Savannah, Georgia, graduated from Savannah High School, then earned his bachelor's degree in political science from The University of Georgia in 1975. Following university, he earned his JD from the University of Georgia School of Law in 1979.

== Career ==
While a practicing attorney, Bordeaux served in the Georgia House of Representatives for 16 years. He represented the 151st district from 1991 to 2003, the 125th district from 2003 to 2005, and the 162nd district from 2005 to 2007. He briefly served as chairman of the House Judiciary Committee until his mid-session removal by Speaker Terry Coleman in 2004 following disputes over bills concerning tort reform and child endangerment. Following his service in the Georgia House of Representatives, Bordeaux was elected to the Savannah City Council, then as judge of the Chatham County Probate Court on May 24, 2016, where he still serves. Among other positions, he has served on the boards of the Savannah Rape Crisis Center and of the Savannah Economic Opportunity Authority for the Savannah-Chatham County Area.

== Awards ==
Bordeaux has received several notable awards for his legal and political work. He received the Robbie E. Robinson Award from the Savannah Bar Association, the Friend of Medicine Award from the Medical Association of Georgia, the Outstanding Legislator Award from the Georgia Trial Lawyers Association, the Friend of Labor Award from Georgia Organized Labor, and the Outstanding Legislator Award from the Georgia Council on Aging.

== Personal life ==
Bordeaux is married to Rev. Nelle Bordeaux who is an associate minister at Wesley Monumental Methodist Church in Savannah and they have two children.
