= Georgia's 17th Senate district =

Georgia's 17th State Senate district

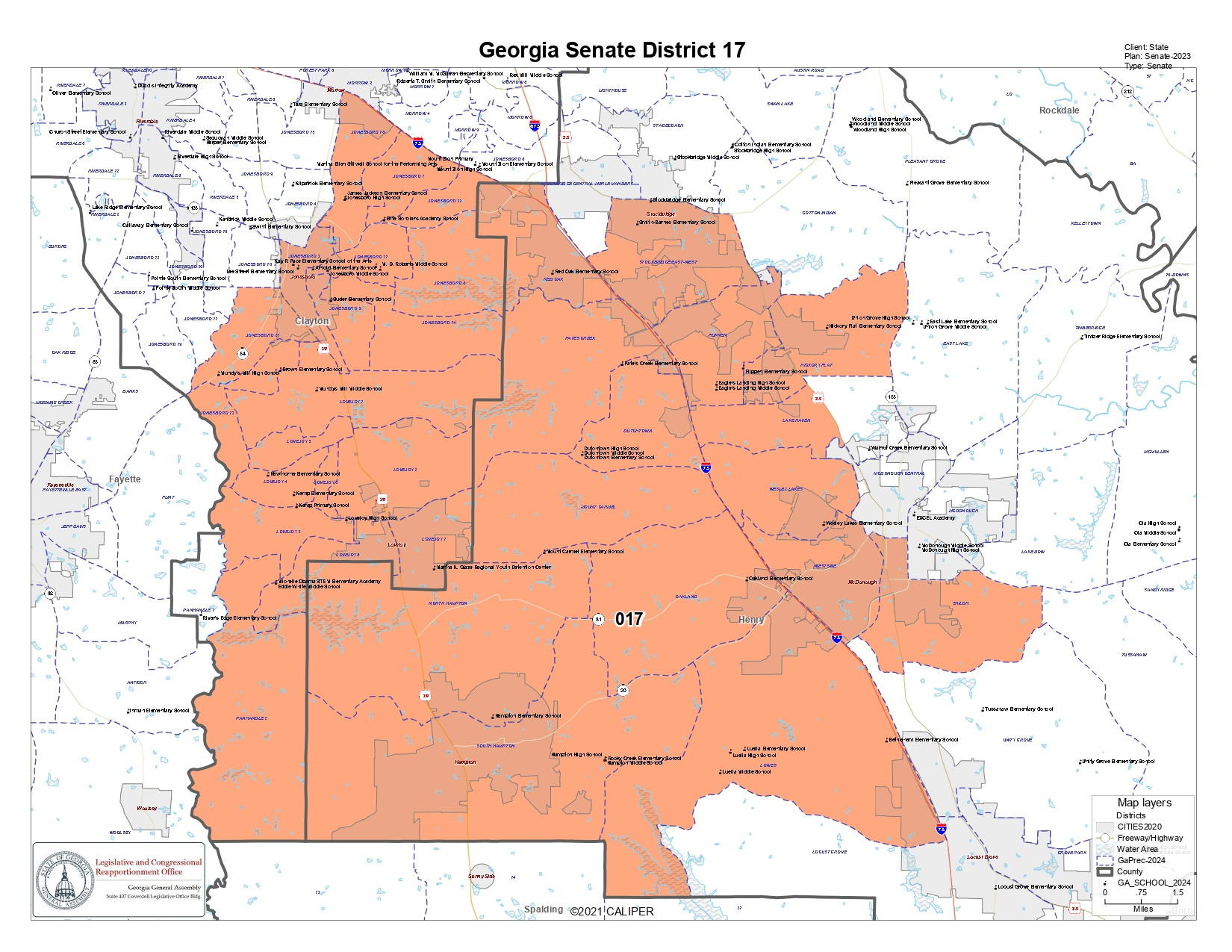
- The 17th district since 2025
Senator
| Gail Davenport; D–Jonesboro |
- Demographics: 20.68% White; 61.8% Black; 8.89% Hispanic; 4.19% Asian; 0.19% Native American; 0.05% Hawaiian/Pacific Islander; 0.73% Other; 4.61% Multiracial
- Population (2020) • Voting age • Citizens of voting age: 190,000; 142,855; 125,148

District 17 of the Georgia Senate is located in southern Metro Atlanta.

The district includes southern Clayton County and western Henry County, including parts of Bonanza, Hampton, Irondale, Jonesboro, Locust Grove, Lovejoy, McDonough, Morrow, and Stockbridge.

The current senator is Gail Davenport, a Democrat from Jonesboro first elected in 2006.

== List of senators ==
| Member | Party | Years | Residence | Electoral history | Counties |
|---|---|---|---|---|---|
| Alex Crumbley | | Until 1989 | | | |
| Mac Collins | Republican | January 3, 1989 – January 3, 1993 | | | |
| Mike Crotts | | 1993 – 2004 | | | |
| Rick Jeffares | Republican | January 10, 2011 – December 1, 2017 | Locust Grove | Elected in 2010. Re-elected in 2012. Re-elected in 2014. Re-elected in 2016. Resigned to run for lieutenant governor. | 2013–2023; Southern Henry County, southern Rockdale County, eastern Newton County |
| Brian Strickland | Republican | January 16, 2018 – January 13, 2025 | McDonough | Elected to finish Jeffares' term. Re-elected in 2018. Re-elected in 2020. Re-elected in 2022. Redistricted to the 42nd district. | 2023–2025; Northwestern Henry County, eastern Newton County, southern Walton County, entirety of Morgan County |
| Gail Davenport | Democratic | January 13, 2025 – present | Jonesboro | Redistricted from the 44th district and re-elected in 2024. | 2025–present Southeastern Clayton County, southwestern Henry County |
