= Judy Manning (politician) =

American politician (1942–2025)

Judy Manning (October 24, 1942 – September 5, 2025) was an American politician who was a member of the House of Representatives in the U.S. state of Georgia. Manning was a Republican and represented District 34, which encompasses parts of Cobb County. She was born in Atlanta, Georgia on October 24, 1942. Married to Aymar Manning, she had two children and three grandchildren. Judy Manning died in Marietta, Georgia, on September 5, 2025, at the age of 83.
