= Steve Thompson (Georgia politician) =

American politician

Member of the Georgia State Senate from the 33rd district
- In office 1991–2015
- Preceded by: Roy Barnes
- Succeeded by: Michael Rhett

Member of the Georgia House of Representatives from the 20th district Post 4
- In office 1981–1991

Personal details
- Born: December 22, 1950 (age 75) Atlanta, Georgia, U.S.
- Party: Democratic

Steve Thompson (born December 22, 1950) is an American politician. He is a member of the Georgia State Senate from the 33rd District, serving from 1991 to 2015. He is a member of the Democratic party. He also served in the Georgia State House of Representatives from 1981 to 1991.
