= Michele Henson =

American politician from Georgia

Member of the Georgia House of Representatives from the 86th district
- In office January 14, 2013 – January 11, 2021
- Preceded by: Karla Drenner
- Succeeded by: Zulma Lopez

Member of the Georgia House of Representatives from the 87th district
- In office January 10, 2005 – January 14, 2013
- Preceded by: Lynn Smith
- Succeeded by: Earnest Williams

Member of the Georgia House of Representatives from the 55th district
- In office January 13, 2003 – January 10, 2005
- Preceded by: Joe Heckstall
- Succeeded by: Mable Thomas

Member of the Georgia House of Representatives from the 65th district
- In office January 14, 1991 – January 13, 2003
- Preceded by: Tyrone Carrell
- Succeeded by: Brooks Coleman

Personal details
- Born: August 29, 1946 (age 80) Boston, Massachusetts, U.S.
- Party: Democratic

Michele Henson (born August 29, 1946) is an American politician who served in the Georgia House of Representatives from 1991 to 2021.
