= Georgia's 24th Senate district =

Georgia's 24th State Senate district
Senator
Lee Anderson; R–Grovetown
- Demographics: 67.45% White; 18.98% Black; 5.40% Hispanic; 3.31% Asian; 0.18% Native American; 0.09% Hawaiian/Pacific Islander; 0.43% Other; 5.38% Multiracial
- Population (2020) • Voting age: 192,674; 148,602

District 24 of the Georgia Senate is located in Northeast Georgia and the Central Savannah River Area, including the northern part of the Augusta metropolitan area.

The district includes northern and eastern Columbia County in the Augusta area and all of Elbert, Greene, Hart, Lincoln, Oglethorpe, and Wilkes counties. In Columbia County, it includes Appling, Evans, Martinez, and part of Grovetown north of Interstate 20.

The current senator is Lee Anderson, a Republican from Grovetown first elected in 2016.
