= Georgia's 29th Senate district =

American legislative district

Georgia's 29th State Senate district
Senator
Randy Robertson; R–Cataula
- Demographics: 60.71% White; 26.22% Black; 5.34% Hispanic; 3.02% Asian; 0.23% Native American; 0.10% Hawaiian/Pacific Islander; 0.42% Other; 5.16% Multiracial
- Population (2020) • Voting age: 189,424; 145,674

District 29 of the Georgia Senate is located in West Georgia anchored in the Columbus metropolitan area, the LaGrange area, and the Chattahoochee River Valley.

The district includes all of Harris, Meriwether, and Troup counties, and northern parts of Columbus-Muscogee County. It includes the Kia manufacturing plant at West Point and the Franklin D. Roosevelt State Park and Little White House in Warm Springs.

The current senator is Randy Robertson, a Republican from Cataula first elected in 2018.

== Senators ==
- J. Render Hill (1965–1984)
- A. Quillian Baldwin Jr. (1984–1992)
- Steve Langford (1992–1998)
- Dan Lee (D, then R) (1998–2004)
- Seth Harp (R) (2004–2010)
- Josh McKoon (R) (2010–2018)
- Randy Robertson (R) (2018–present)
