= Seal of Georgia =

Official government emblem of the U.S. state of Georgia

Great Seal of the State of Georgia

Versions
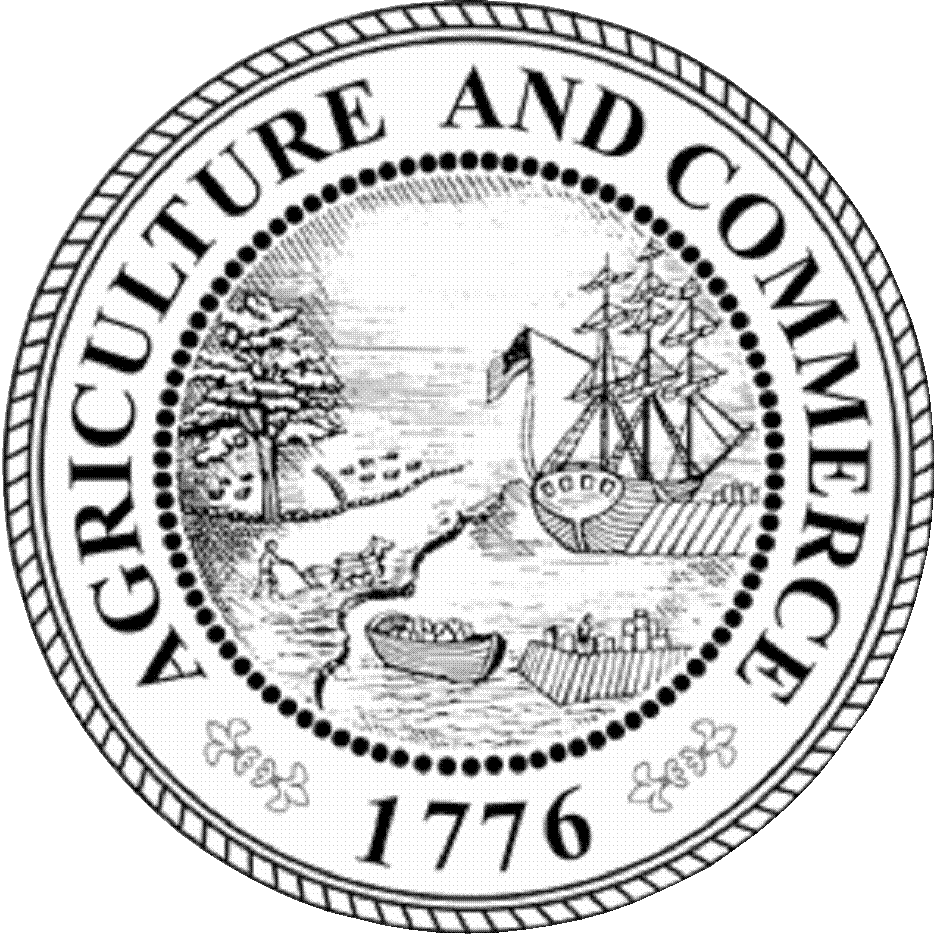
- Reverse

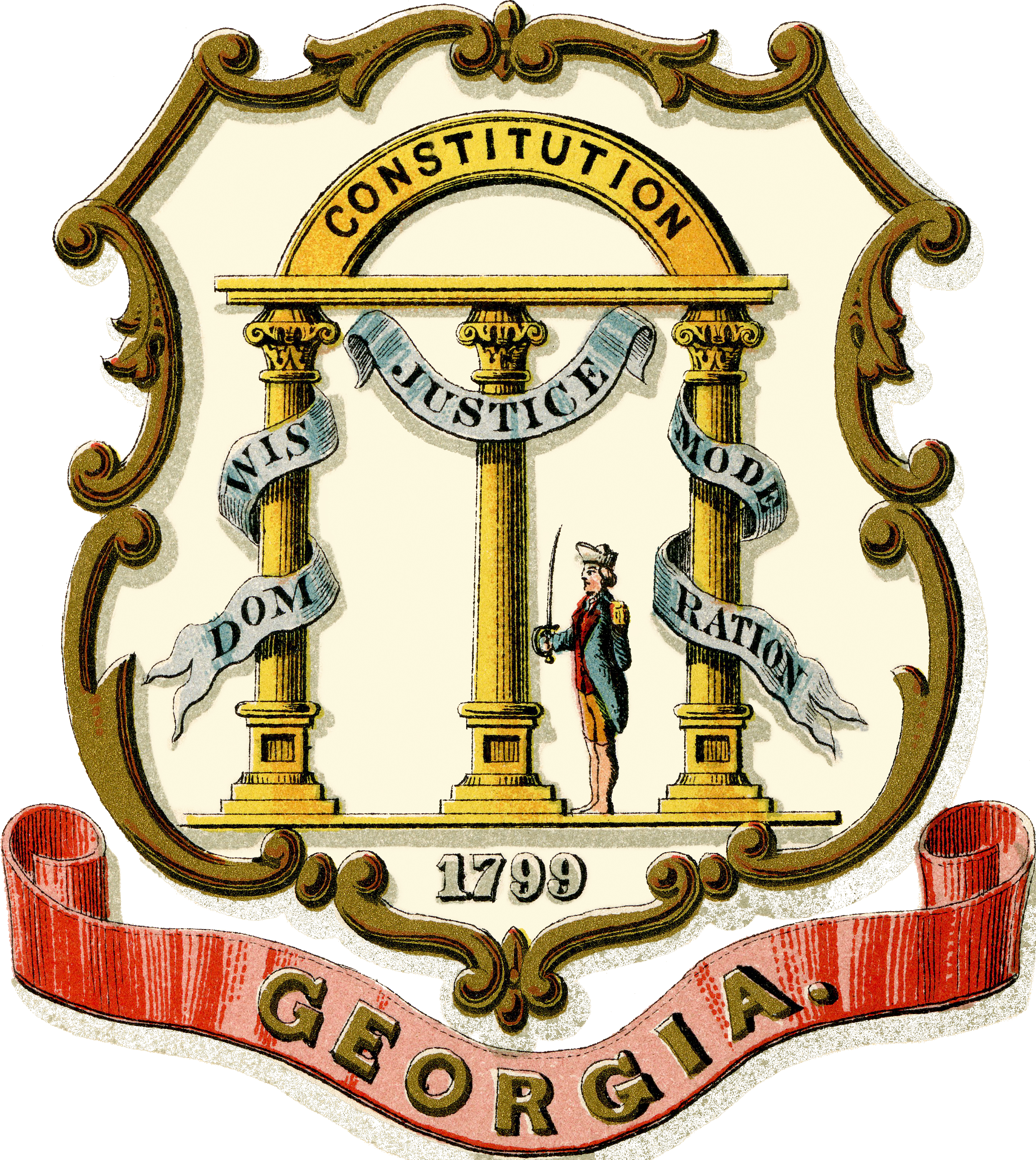
- Historical coat of arms (1876)
- Armiger: State of Georgia
- Adopted: 1777 (original) 1914 (current)
- Motto: State of Georgia, 1776 (obverse) Agriculture and Commerce, 1776 (reverse)

The Great Seal of the State of Georgia is a device that has historically been used to authenticate government documents executed by the state of Georgia. The first great seal of the state was specified in the State Constitution of 1777, and its current form was adopted in 1799 with alterations in 1914. Its specifications are currently spelled out by statute.

== Description ==
The original seal from 1777 was specified as such: "The great seal of this State shall have the following device: on one side of a scroll, whereon shall be engraved “The Constitution of the State of Georgia;” and the motto “Pro bono publico.” On the other side, an elegant house, and other buildings, fields of corn, and meadows covered with sheep and cattle; a river running through the same, with a ship under full sail, and the motto, “Deus nobis haec otia fecit.”

On February 8, 1799 an Act of the Legislature stated the seal as "On the one side a view of the seashore with a ship bearing the flag of the United States, riding near a wharf, receiving aboard hogsheads of tobacco and bales of cotton, emblematic of the exports of this State; at a small distance a boat landing from the interior of the State with hogsheads etc., on board representing her internal traffic; in the back part of the same side, a man in the act of ploughing; and at a small distance a flock of sheep in different postures shaded by a flourishing tree, the motto on this side agriculture and commerce, 1799. That the other side contain three pillars supporting an arch, with the word Constitution, engraven within the same, emblematic of the Constitution supported by three departments of the government, viz.: the legislative, judicial and executive, the first pillar to have engraven on its base, wisdom; the second justice; and the third, moderation; on the right of the last pillar a man standing with a drawn sword, representing the aid of the military in defense of the Constitution; the motto, State of Georgia, 1799".

=== Current design ===
The obverse (front) of the seal is centered on the coat of arms of the state: an arch with three columns, the arch symbolizing the state's Constitution and the columns representing the three branches of government (legislative, executive, and judicial). The words of the official state motto, "Wisdom, Justice, Moderation," are inscribed on scrolls that are wrapped around the columns. A member of the Georgia Militia stands between the second and third columns, holding a drawn sword in his right hand, representing the citizen/soldier's defense of the state's Constitution. (Note: The figure represented on Georgia's State Seal dates much earlier than the American Revolution, and represents more than a standard soldier. The figure depicted is from the Georgia Militia. A citizen-soldier. A pre-United States ancestor of the National Guardsman (which was a Federal creation). One may easily argue that the language of the current O.C.G.A. § 50-3-30 lends strong credit for the capitalized meaning of Constitution to refer to the US version. But a review of the Seal's history and through understanding of Georgia's history may lend weight towards another conclusion. A member of the Georgia Militia from this period would never dream of defending the (US) "Constitution". If we review the official precedents of the Seal (See laws 1799, Cobb's 1851 Digest, p. 959; Code 1863, § 86; Code 1868, § 81; Code 1873, § 86; Code 1882, § 86; Civil Code 1895, § 184; Civil Code 1910, § 213; Ga. L. 1914, p. 1247; Code 1933, § 40-701; Ga. L. 2001, p. 1, § 3) and utilize Georgia's turbulent transition after the Civil War ( Reconstruction - the downfall of the Progressives and election of McKinley), the Soldier, therefore, embodies the legacy of General Oglethorpe's Militia, who truly protected the Georgia Charter and eventually the Georgia Constitutions after the Revolutionary War. Fundamentally, Georgia was staunchly pro-cession throughout the Post Revolution with increasing anti-Federal sentiments until well after the Civil War. The State's Right argument in a nutshell. Concessions may be made that some of Georgia's leadership during this period (the First Seal with 1799) were pro Federalist like Clarke but these sentiments fell away by the 1860s. During Reconstruction, the seals were hidden until the Reconstruction supporters was eliminated. It was not until after the failure of the Farmers Alliance and eventual Progressive movement collapsed when Georgia began its true integration into National Government. With the election of McKinley and several subsequent presidents, America turned to building an empire through imperialistic growth. This gradual acceptance and transition from the old Bourbon ruled Georgia to the modernization and integration into National Affairs encompasses the time period when we see many of Georgia's semiotics change. The change from 1799 (a date originating from the state's history) to 1776 ( a Federally important date) lends credit to the argument that the original intent of the Georgia Seal was symbolic of Georgia's classic history, not the contemporary version which has become altered to sugar coat the state's true and turbulent past.) A border surrounds the coat of arms, and the motto "State of Georgia, 1776" is inscribed outside the arms.

The reverse (back) of the seal contains an image of Georgia's coast, with a ship (bearing the American flag) arriving to take aboard tobacco and cotton, symbolizing Georgia's export trade. A second, smaller boat represents the state's "internal traffic." Towards the left of the image, there is a man plowing and a flock of sheep. The motto "Agriculture and Commerce, 1776" is inscribed around the outside of the image.

The dates listed on the obverse and reverse of the seal were originally 1799. The dates were changed by the Georgia state legislature in 1914 to reflect the date of the signing of the Declaration of Independence.

== History and lore ==
In 1902, the Georgia General Assembly mandated that the coat of arms (the central portion of the obverse) be included in the state flag of Georgia. Either the coat of arms or the state seal has appeared on every state flag since that date.

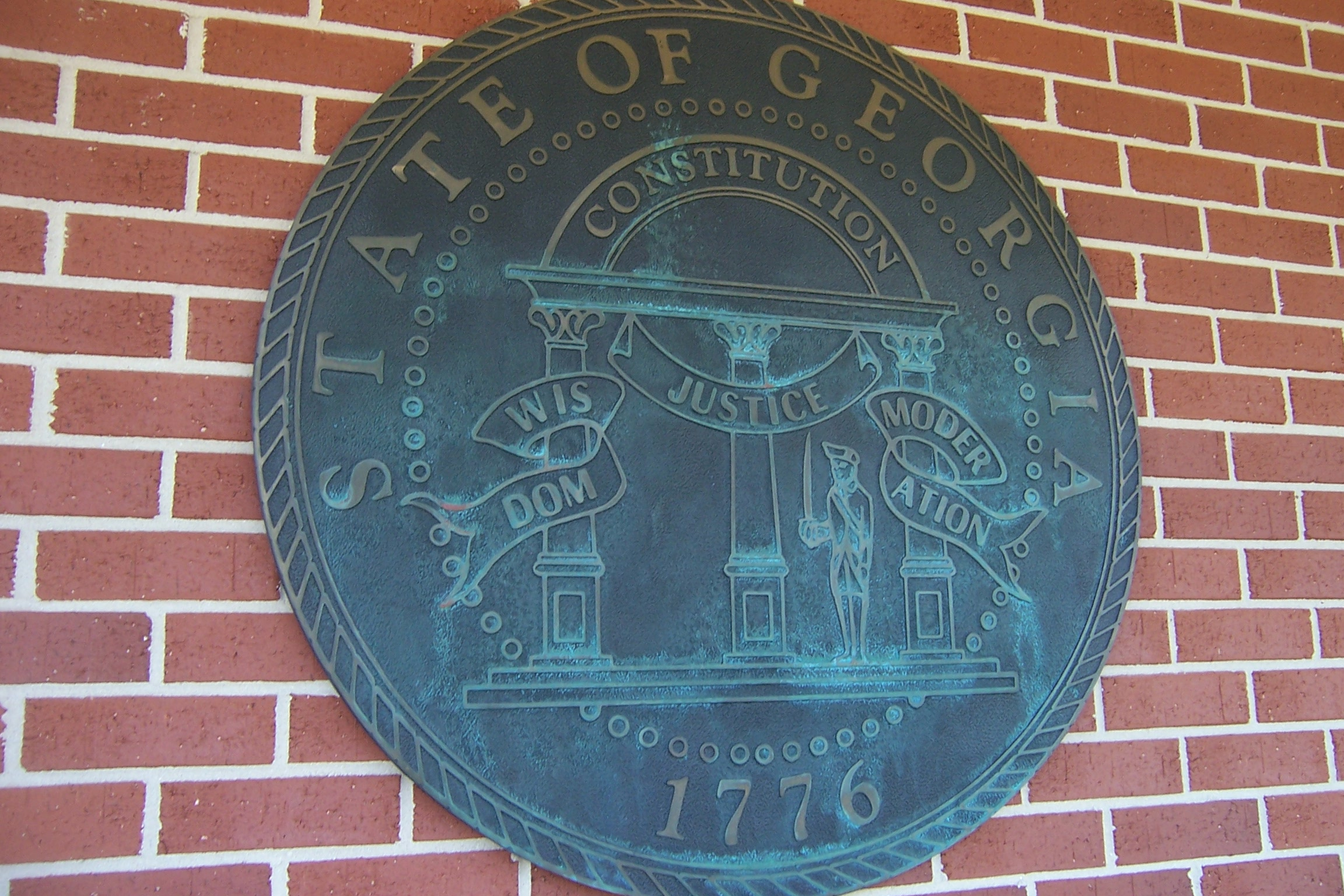
A large metallic representation of the Seal, as seen at a rest area along Interstate 20 in Georgia outside of Harlem

By law, the Secretary of State is the official custodian of the Great Seal, which is attached to official papers by executive order of the Governor. This custodianship has led to some controversies:

=== Period of the False Seal ===
From 1868 to 1871, during Reconstruction, the Great Seal was not used for state business. It had been hidden under the home of wartime Secretary of State Nathan C. Barnett, to prevent its use by Federal forces. The Reconstruction government, having failed to locate the official seal, had a duplicate seal fabricated. The duplicate was a perfect match for the original, except for one small detail: the soldier held his sword in his left hand. Reconstruction in Georgia became known as the "Period of the False Seal". In 1872, when local rule resumed in Georgia, Barnett (who had been re-elected by that point) unearthed the original seal and returned it to the Capitol.

=== Three governors controversy ===
In December 1946, Governor-elect Eugene Talmadge died before assuming office. Talmadge's son, Herman, was appointed governor by the State Legislature. This was challenged by the Lieutenant Governor-elect Melvin Thompson, who maintained that the state constitution authorized him to assume the office upon the death of the governor. Outgoing governor Ellis Arnall announced that he would not relinquish the office until it was clear who the new governor was. The political turmoil that ensued became known as the "three governors controversy". In January 1947, while all three governors occupied different portions of the State Capitol, Secretary of State Ben W. Fortson, Jr., took the seal and hid it. This prevented any of the claimants to the governorship from executing any business until the Supreme Court of Georgia could make a ruling on the rightful winner. Thompson was eventually declared "acting governor" until a special election could be held to fill the remainder of the original term. Herman Talmadge won the special election and served out the remaining portion of his father's term.

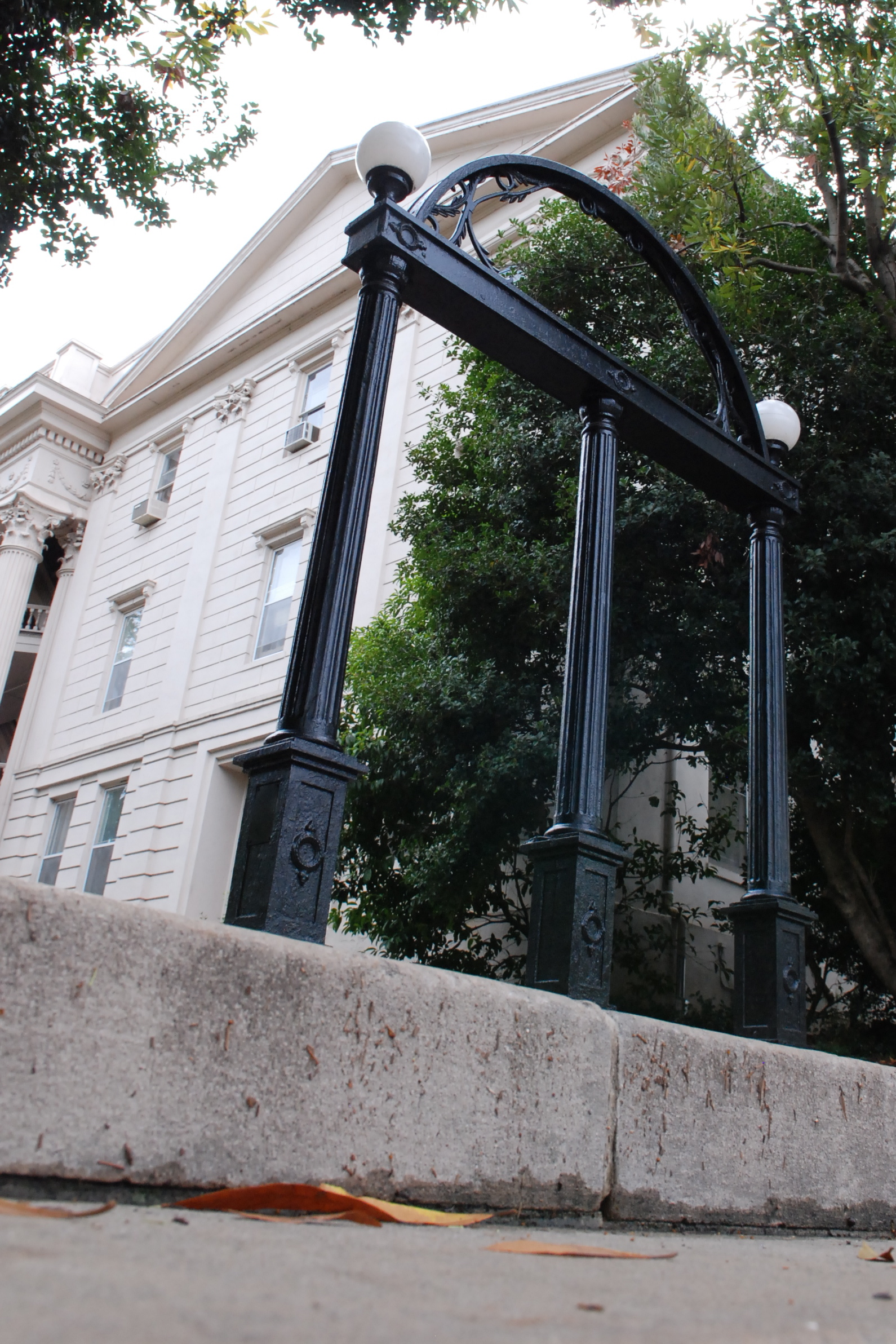
UGA arch

=== The Arch ===
In 1857, the University of Georgia constructed a cast iron representation of the architectural elements featured on the obverse of the Great Seal. It stands at the north entrance of the campus, and has become known as The Arch. Fashioned from existing material, The Arch is a representation but not an exact replica of the elements of the Seal. Originally serving both symbolic and practical functions, it was connected to a barrier which kept cows from roaming over parts of the campus, and was initially known as The Gate. Today, The Arch is an important symbol of the University. According to legend, it is bad luck for freshmen (or, in some versions, any undergraduate student) to walk under the arch. Legend suggests that any student walking through the arch prematurely will never graduate.

The "digital seal" used by the Government of Georgia's websites and other digital properties, being a stylized and hyper-simplified version of the arch seal.

== Government Seals of Georgia ==
Seal of the Georgia State Senate

Seal of the Georgia House of Representatives

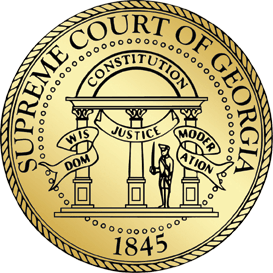
Seal of the Supreme Court of Georgia

== See also ==
- Flag of Georgia (U.S. state)
- Seal
- Governor of Georgia
- Georgia Secretary of State
