= David Graves (politician) =

American politician

Member of the Georgia House of Representatives from the 137th district
- In office 1996–2005

Personal details
- Born: May 17, 1957 (age 69)
- Party: Republican
- Spouse: divorced

David Graves (born May 17, 1957) is a former Republican member of the Georgia House of Representatives, representing the 137th district from 1996 to 2005. Graves was a member of the Appropriations, Health & Human Services, Regulated Industries, and the Rules Committees.

== Resignation ==
Graves resigned in 2005, shortly after his second DWI arrest, and his subsequent attempt to claim legislative immunity, which was rejected. He was sentenced to 10 days in jail, fined $1,600, 20 days of home confinement, 240 hours of community service, and alcohol counseling. His driver's license was suspended for 12 to 18 months. He did not run for re-election.
