= Calvin Smyre =

American politician (born 1947)

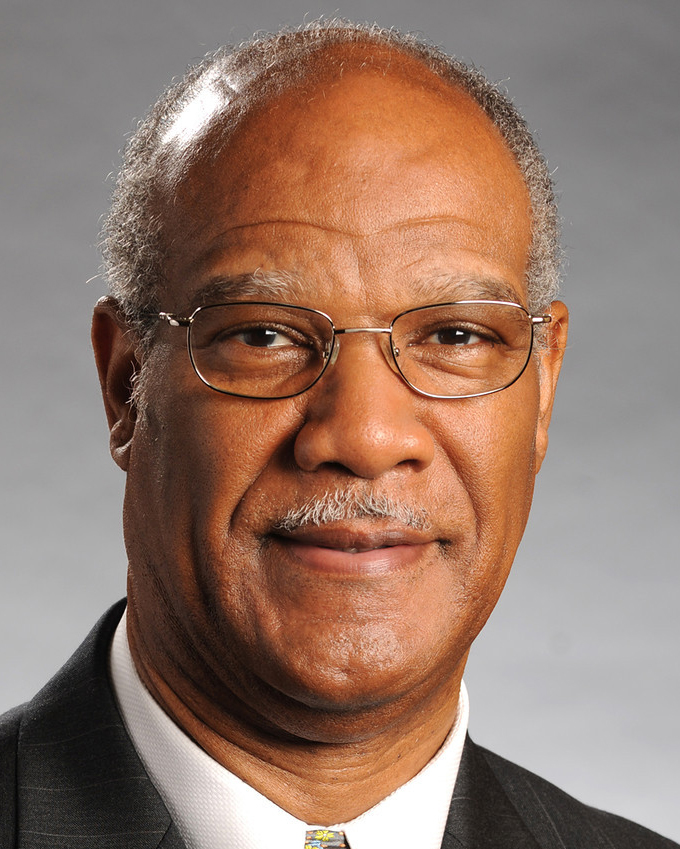
- Official headshot, c. 2011

Member of the Georgia House of Representatives
- In office January 13, 1975 – January 9, 2023
- Preceded by: Hines L. Brantley
- Succeeded by: Teddy Reese
- Constituency: 92nd district (1975–1993); 136th district (1993–2003); 111th district (2003–2005); 132nd district (2005–2013); 135th district (2013–2023)

Personal details
- Born: May 17, 1947 (age 79) Columbus, Georgia, U.S.
- Party: Democratic
- Education: Fort Valley State University (BS)
- Occupation: Retired banker

Calvin Smyre (born May 17, 1947) is an American politician who served as a member of the Georgia House of Representatives. Elected in 1974, he was the longest-serving member of the Georgia Legislature. In May 2022, his nomination to serve as the United States ambassador to the Dominican Republic was withdrawn and he was instead nominated to serve as the United States ambassador to the Bahamas.

== Early life and education ==
Smyre was born in Columbus, Georgia as one of three children to Carter Smyre Jr. and Mildred Rudine Smyre (née Bass). His father, Carter Smyre Jr. (1926–2024), was a native of Griffin, Georgia and career officer of the U.S. Army who owned a realty company and was appointed by Governor Joe Frank Harris to the Georgia Residential Financial Authority. Smyre earned a Bachelor of Science degree from Fort Valley State University with a focus in business administration.

== Career ==
Smyre has served as a delegate for Georgia to every Democratic National Convention since 1980, and became the first African American member elected from Georgia to the Democratic National Committee in 1984. He advised the presidential campaigns of Jimmy Carter, Bill Clinton, and Al Gore, and served as an elector for Georgia to the Electoral College in 1980, 1992, and 2020.

Smyre became the youngest member of the Georgia House of Representatives when he was elected to the chamber at the age of 26 in 1974.

Governor Joe Frank Harris appointed Smyre assistant floor leader in the 1983 legislative session and, in 1986, appointed him floor leader for the 1987 session, making him the first African American leader of the House since Reconstruction. In 1998, he was elected the first African American Chairman of the Democratic Party's state legislative caucus; and, in 2001, Smyre was appointed Chairman of the state Democratic Party. In 2006, he was elected President of the National Black Caucus of State Legislators. Smyre is known for helping Democrats and Republicans negotiate, acting as a liaison.

Smyre also worked as executive vice president of corporate external affairs at Synovus and president of the Synovus Foundation.

=== Biden administration ===
On September 22, 2021, President Joe Biden announced that he would nominate Smyre to serve as the United States ambassador to the Dominican Republic. On October 4, 2021, his nomination was sent to the Senate. On May 17, 2022, his nomination was withdrawn, and he was nominated to serve as the ambassador to the Bahamas.

On May 13, 2022, President Joe Biden announced his intent to nominate Smyre to serve as the next United States ambassador to the Bahamas. On May 17, 2022, his nomination was sent to the Senate. His nomination was not acted on for the remainder of the Congress and was sent back to Biden on January 3, 2023.

President Biden renominated Smyre the same day, however the nomination never reached the Senate Foreign Relations Committee before Biden left office on January 20, 2025.

== See also ==
- List of ambassadors appointed by Joe Biden

Georgia House of Representatives
Preceded by Hines L. Brantley	Member of the Georgia House of Representatives from the 92nd district 1975–1993	Succeeded by Denny M. Dobbs
Preceded by Ray Holland	Member of the Georgia House of Representatives from the 136th district 1993–2003	Succeeded by Winfred Dukes
Preceded by Mickey Channell	Member of the Georgia House of Representatives from the 111th district 2003–2005	Succeeded by Jeff May
Preceded by Johnny Floyd	Member of the Georgia House of Representatives from the 132nd district 2005–2013	Succeeded by Carl Von Epps
Preceded by Lynmore James	Member of the Georgia House of Representatives from the 135th district 2013–2023	Succeeded by Beth Camp
Preceded by Bill Lee	Majority Caucus Chair of the Georgia House of Representatives; 1999–2005	Succeeded by Sharon Cooper
Preceded by Sharon Cooper	Minority Caucus Chair of the Georgia House of Representatives; 2005–2011	Succeeded by Brian Thomas
Party political offices
Preceded by David Worley	Chair of the Georgia Democratic Party; 2001–2004	Succeeded by Bobby Kahn
