= National Register of Historic Places listings in Macon County, Georgia =

This is a list of properties and districts in Macon County, Georgia that are listed on the National Register of Historic Places (NRHP).

This National Park Service list is complete through NPS recent listings posted March 21, 2025.

== Current listings ==
	Name on the Register	Image	Date listed	Location	City or town	Description
1	Alma Fruit Farm		November 25, 1980 (#80004446)	GA 49W; 32°26′13″N 84°00′04″W	Marshallville	Also known as the Jones-Peterson House.
2	Andersonville National Historic Site	Andersonville National Historic Site	October 16, 1970 (#70000070)	1 mi. E of Andersonville on GA 49; 32°11′41″N 84°07′44″W	Andersonville	administered by the National Park Service
3	Billy Place		November 25, 1980 (#80004444)	Rt. 1; 32°25′10″N 83°57′44″W	Marshallville	
4	DeVaughn-Lewis House		May 2, 1985 (#85000937)	510 S. Dooly St. 32°17′38″N 84°01′53″W	Montezuma	
5	East Main Street Residential District		November 25, 1980 (#80004454)	E. Main St. 32°27′18″N 83°56′12″W	Marshallville	
6	William Hamilton Felton House		November 25, 1980 (#80004447)	McCaskill St. 32°26′50″N 83°57′02″W	Marshallville	
7	Wilkes Knob Plantation		November 25, 1980 (#80004451)	Rt. 1; 32°28′20″N 83°52′48″W	Marshallville	
8	Lamson-Richardson School		May 18, 1981 (#81000697)	Railroad St. 32°26′49″N 83°56′40″W	Marshallville	
9	Macon County Courthouse	Macon County Courthouse	September 18, 1980 (#80001113)	Courthouse Sq. 32°17′36″N 84°03′36″W	Oglethorpe	
10	Marshallville Commercial District		November 25, 1980 (#80004452)	Main St. 32°27′23″N 83°55′24″W	Marshallville	
11	Massee Lane		November 25, 1980 (#80004450)	Rt. 1; 32°29′17″N 83°56′09″W	Marshallville	
12	Montezuma Depot	Montezuma Depot	June 12, 1980 (#80001112)	S. Dooly St. 32°18′02″N 84°01′46″W	Montezuma	
13	Montezuma Historic District	Montezuma Historic District	October 13, 2003 (#03001017)	Roughly centered along N. and S. Dooly St. 32°18′11″N 84°01′47″W	Montezuma	
14	Thronateeska		November 25, 1980 (#80004445)	Rt. 1; 32°25′14″N 84°00′59″W	Marshallville	Seems to be gone in recent satellite views
15	West Main Street Residential District		November 25, 1980 (#80004453)	W. Main St. 32°27′21″N 83°56′59″W	Marshallville	
16	Willow Lake		November 25, 1980 (#80004449)	Rt. 1; 32°28′36″N 83°53′25″W	Marshallville	
