= Billy Place =

- U.S. National Register of Historic Places
- Location within Georgia Location within the United States
- Nearest city: Marshallville, Georgia
- Coordinates: 32°25′10″N 83°57′44″W
- Area: 1,815 acres (735 ha)
- Built: 1830
- Architectural style: Plantation Plain
- MPS: Marshallville and Vicinity MRA
- NRHP reference No.: 80004444
- Added to NRHP: November 25, 1980

The Felton House, also known as Billy Place, is a historic residence in Marshallville, Georgia. It was added to the National Register of Historic Places on November 25, 1980. It is located on Route 1.

William Felton established residence on the stage road from Lanier, Georgia to Perry, Georgia, 4 miles west of Winchester, Georgia. He married Matilda Rushin and then after her death her sister Matilda Rushin. He built the home that was also used as a stage coach stop and tavern.

The home was designed what is referred to as Plantation Plain architecture style and includes brick chimneys, a two-story Greek Revival architecture portico and 11 foot ceilings. Barns and sheds were also constructed on the property and cotton was grown on the property. A railroad line was constructed on land ceded from the property.

== See also ==
- National Register of Historic Places listings in Macon County, Georgia
