= Macon County School District =

School district in Georgia (U.S. state)

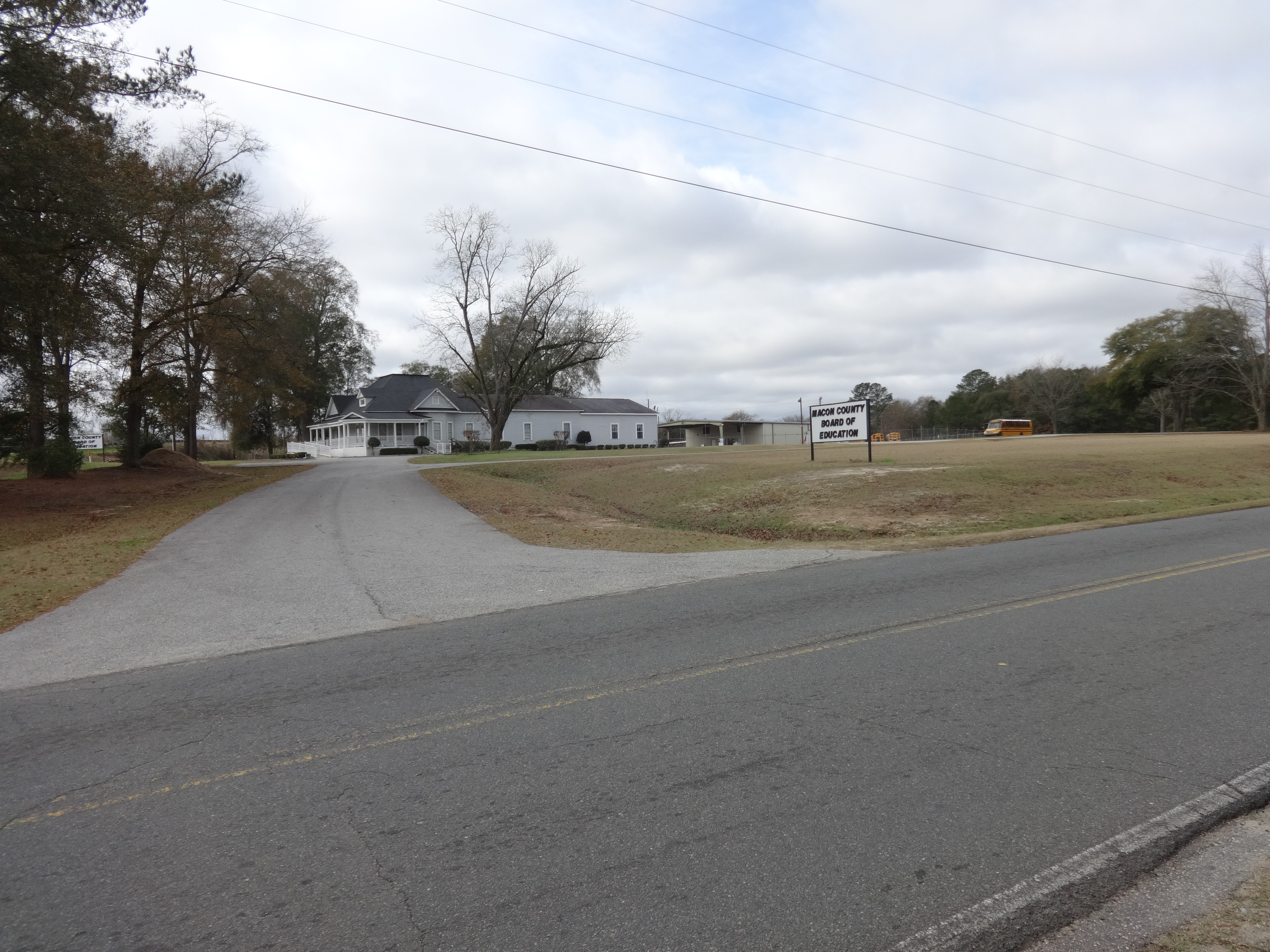

Address
- 49 S Highway 49 Oglethorpe, Georgia, 31068; United States
- Coordinates: 32.284248°N 84.070344°W

District information
- Grades: Pre-school - 12
- Superintendent: Marc Maynor
- Accreditation(s): Southern Association of Colleges and Schools; Georgia Accrediting Commission

Students and staff
- Enrollment: 2,200
- Faculty: 129

Other information
- Telephone: (478) 472-8188
- Fax: (478) 472-2042
- Website: www.macon.k12.ga.us

The Macon County School District is a public school district in Macon County, Georgia, United States, based in Oglethorpe. It serves the communities of Ideal, Marshallville, Montezuma, and Oglethorpe.

== Schools ==
The Macon County School District has one elementary school, one middle school, and one high school.

=== Elementary schools ===
- Macon County Elementary School

=== Middle school ===
- Macon County Middle School

=== High school ===
- Macon County High School
