= Macon County Courthouse =

Macon County Courthouse may refer to:

- Macon County Courthouse (Alabama), Tuskegee, Alabama
- Macon County Courthouse (Georgia), Oglethorpe, Georgia
- Macon County Courthouse and Annex, Macon, Missouri
