= D. W. Orr =

D. W. Orr may refer to:

- David W. Orr (born 1940), American environmentalist
- Dickinson W. Orr (1819–1867), American slave trader
