= Macon County High School =

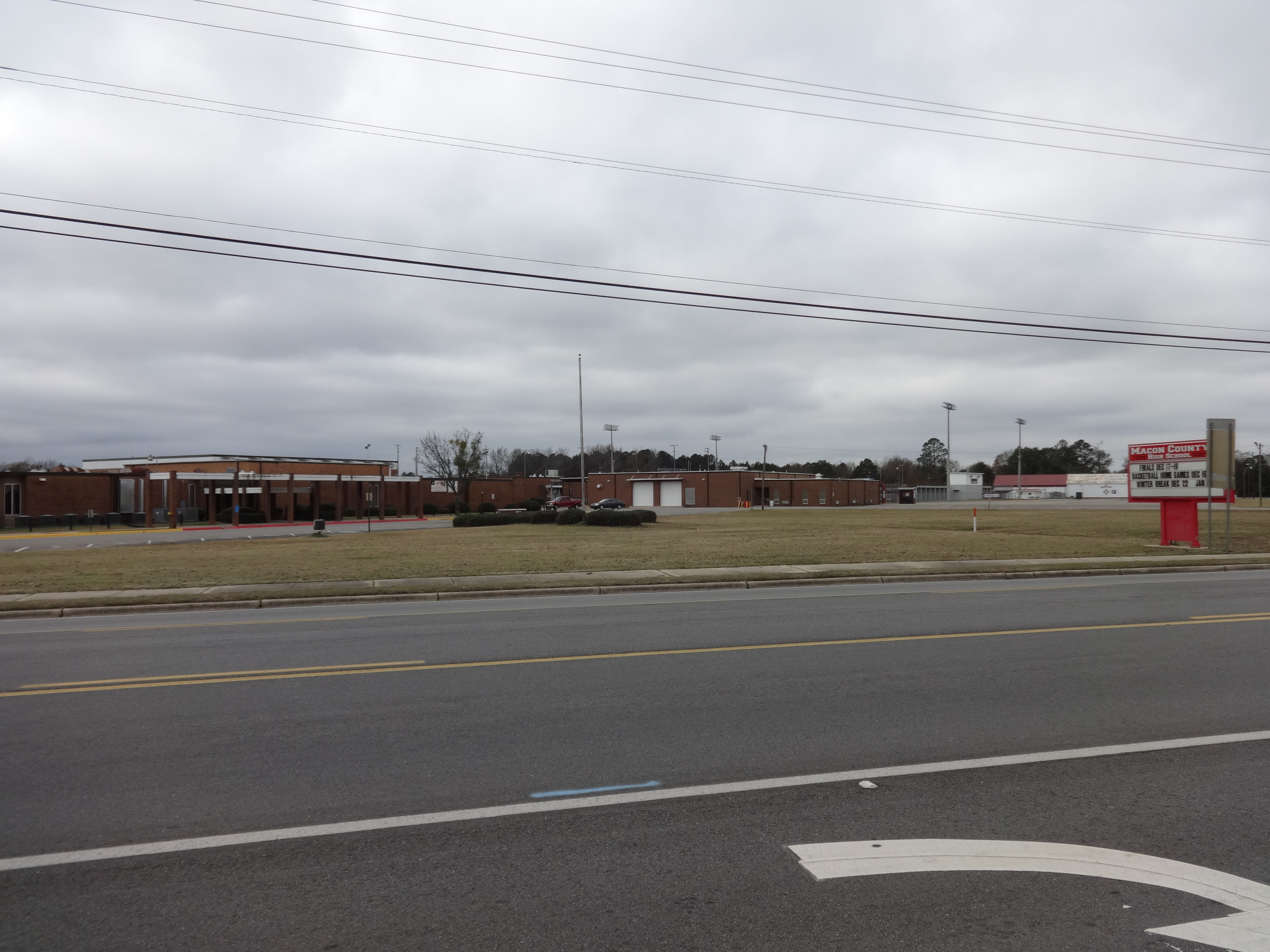

Location
- 611 Vienna Road; Montezuma, Georgia 31063; United States; 32.290335°N 84.015259°W

Information
- School district: Macon County School District
- Principal: Nakia Parks
- Teaching staff: 22.30 (FTE)
- Grades: 9-12
- Enrollment: 324 (2023-2024)
- Student to teacher ratio: 14.53
- Colors: Red, black and white
- Nickname: Bulldogs
- Accreditation: Southern Association of Colleges and Schools
- Telephone: (478) 472-8579
- Fax: (478) 472-6206
- Website: https://mchs.macon.k12.ga.us/

Macon County High School is located in Montezuma, Georgia, United States, which is a part of Macon County. Enrollment as of the 2017- 2018 school year is 491.

== History ==
Macon County High School was established in the late 1950s as a school for Caucasians in the area. The school for African Americans was D.F. Douglas High School, which remained open after the desegregation of American school systems. D.F. Douglass abruptly closed in 1998 due to low attendance.

The first principal of Macon County High School was Carl S. Peaster. Wylene Webb, Danny Saunds and Rickey Edmonds also served as principals. Currently, Nakia Parks serves as principal.

As of February 2018, students are being housed in the Macon County Middle School due to the construction of a new and improved Macon County High School, including a new gym.

== Alumni ==
- Ervin Baldwin, former NFL Defensive End
- Antonio Cochran, former NFL Defensive End
- Roquan Smith, NFL linebacker
