= Roquan Smith =

American football player (born 1997)

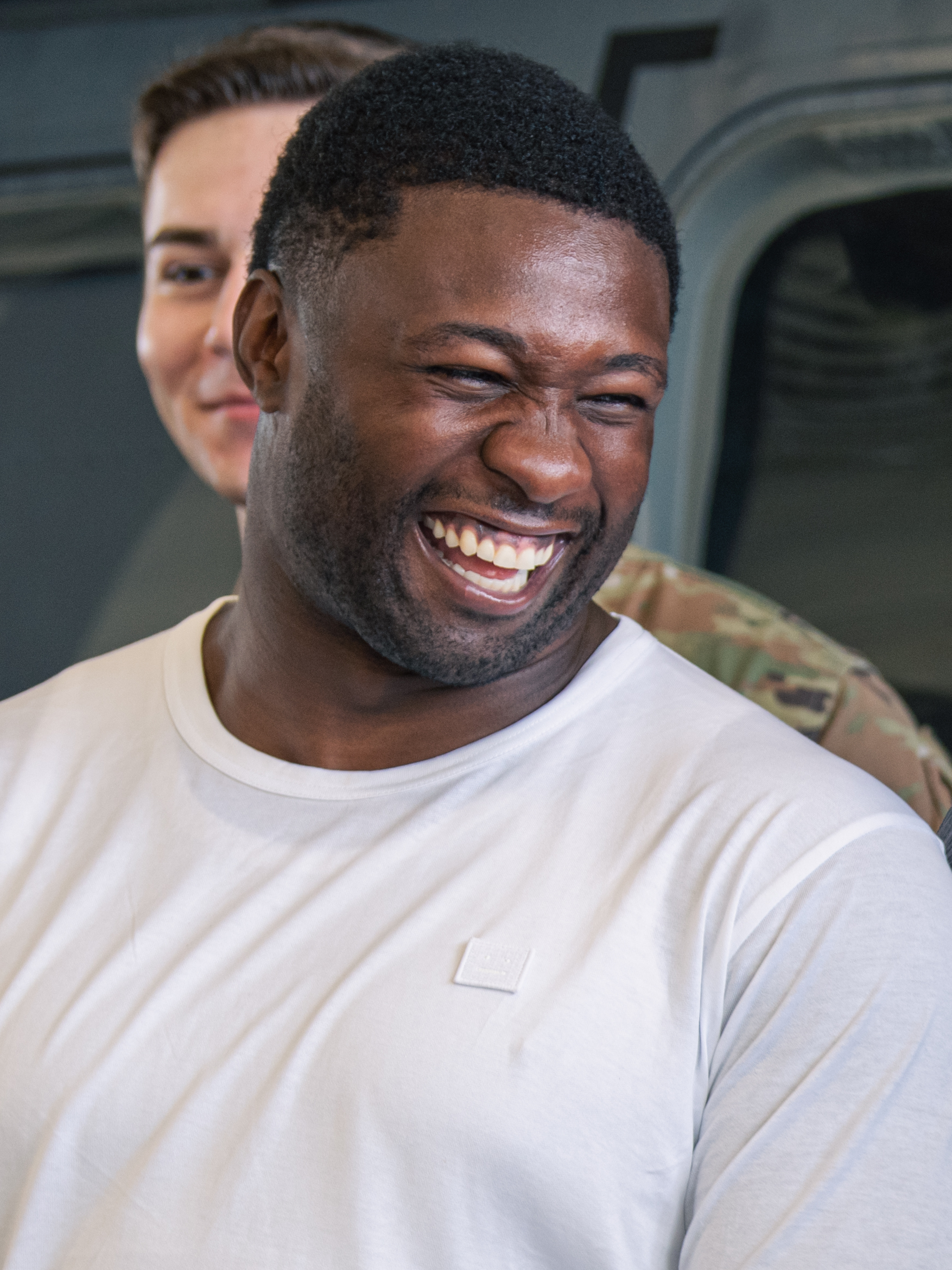
- Smith in 2023

No. 0 – Baltimore Ravens
- Position: Linebacker
- Roster status: Active

Personal information
- Born: April 8, 1997 (age 29); Marshallville, Georgia, U.S.
- Listed height: 6 ft 1 in (1.85 m)
- Listed weight: 235 lb (107 kg)

Career information
- High school: Macon County (Montezuma, Georgia)
- College: Georgia (2015–2017)
- NFL draft: 2018: 1st round, 8th overall pick

Career history
- Chicago Bears (2018–2022); Baltimore Ravens (2022–present)

Awards and highlights
- 3× First-team All-Pro (2022–2024); 2× Second-team All-Pro (2020, 2021); 4× Pro Bowl (2022–2025); 2× Butkus Award (pro) (2022, 2023); PFWA All-Rookie Team (2018); Butkus Award (college) (2017); Unanimous All-American (2017); SEC Defensive Player of the Year (2017); First-team All-SEC (2017)

Career NFL statistics as of Week 7, 2026
- Total tackles: 1,190
- Sacks: 23.5
- Pass deflections: 40
- Interceptions: 11
- Forced fumbles: 4
- Fumble recoveries: 3
- Defensive touchdowns: 2
- Stats at Pro Football Reference

Roquan Daevon Smith (born April 8, 1997) is an American professional football linebacker for the Baltimore Ravens of the National Football League (NFL). He played college football for the Georgia Bulldogs. Smith became the first Georgia Bulldog to win the Butkus Award.

== Early life ==
Smith was introduced to organized football at the age of six. In the years to follow his youth football coaches had to keep a copy of his birth certificate on file to dispute claims that he was too old to play. He attended Macon County High School in Montezuma, Georgia, where he played football for the Bulldogs. He originally committed to the University of California, Los Angeles (UCLA) to play college football but changed his commitment to the University of Georgia.

== College career ==
While at the University of Georgia, Smith played college football under head coaches Mark Richt and Kirby Smart. As a true freshman at Georgia in 2015, Smith played in 12 games and recorded 20 tackles. As a sophomore in 2016, he started 10 of 13 games, recording 95 tackles.

In 2017, Smith was named MVP of the SEC Championship Game, as well as SEC Defensive Player of the Year by the Associated Press. He became the first Georgia Bulldog to win the Butkus Award. Smith decided to forgo his final year of eligibility and entered the 2018 NFL draft.

== Professional career ==
Pre-draft measurables
Height	Weight	Arm length	Hand span	Wingspan	40-yard dash	10-yard split	20-yard split	Vertical jump	Broad jump
6 ft 0 7/8 in (1.85 m)	236 lb (107 kg)	32 in (0.81 m)	10 in (0.25 m)	6 ft 5 in (1.96 m)	4.51 s	1.51 s	2.63 s	33.5 in (0.85 m)	9 ft 9 in (2.97 m)
All values from NFL Combine/Pro Day

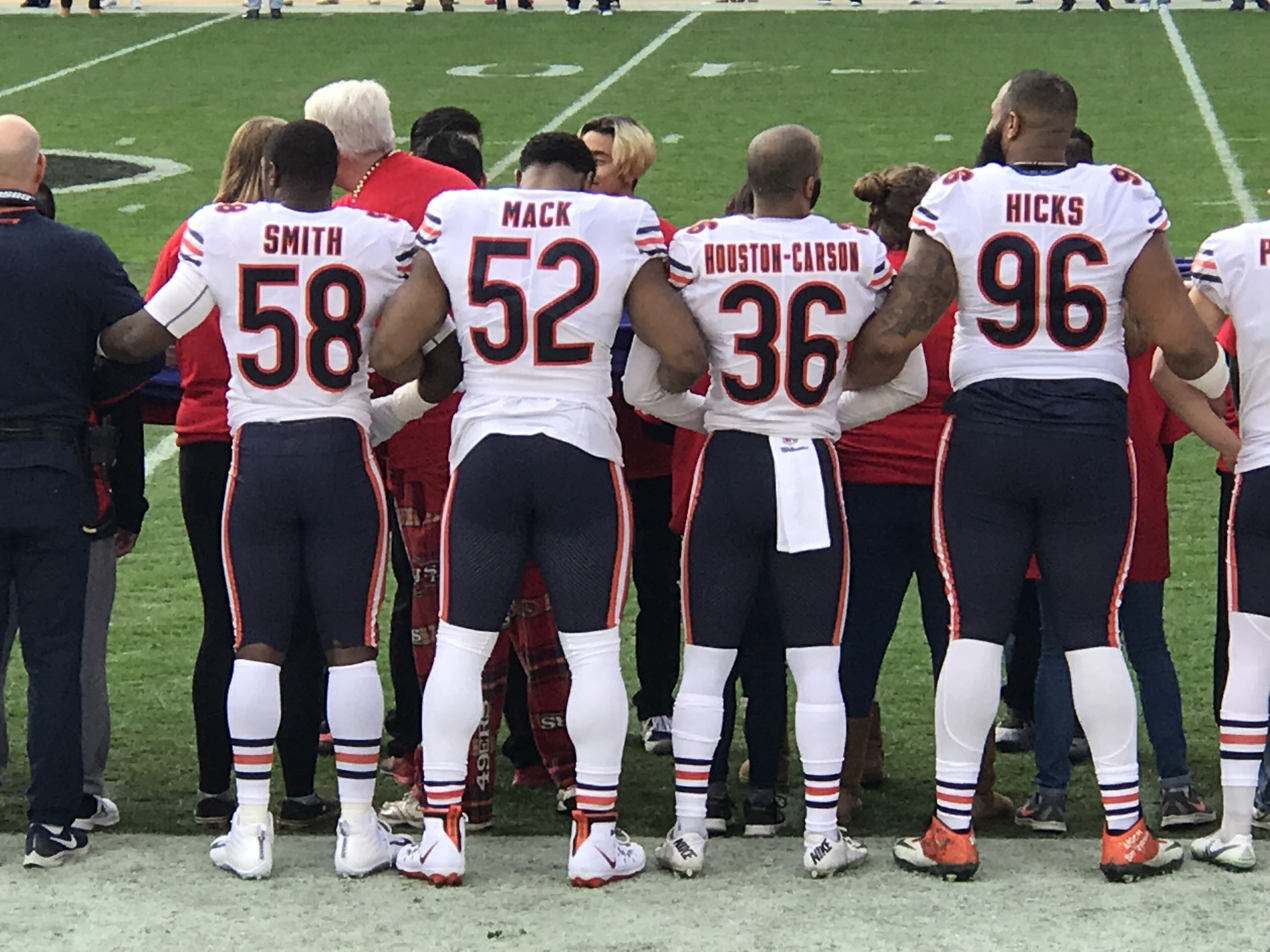
Smith with Khalil Mack, DeAndre Houston-Carson, and Akiem Hicks of the Chicago Bears in 2018

=== Chicago Bears ===
==== 2018 ====
Smith was selected by the Chicago Bears with the eighth overall pick in the first round of the 2018 NFL draft.

His contract signing was significantly delayed due to contract disputes between the Bears and Smith's agency CAA Football over language in his rookie contract stating whether his guaranteed money would be reclaimed by the team if he was suspended due to the NFL's new rule outlawing contact leading with the helmet. CAA argued for wording that would protect Smith's guaranteed earnings, while the Bears preferred for decisions to be determined by the league, a situation that was exacerbated by skepticism surrounding the rule and the frequency of tackling in Smith's role. On August 14, the Bears signed Smith to a fully guaranteed four-year, $18.47 million contract that included a signing bonus of $11.51 million. He was the last first-round pick in his draft class to sign with his team.

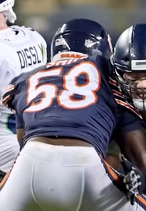
Roquan Smith in a game against the Seattle Seahawks

In his NFL debut in Week 1 against the Green Bay Packers, Smith recorded a sack on the Packers' quarterback DeShone Kizer on his first career snap. In Week 6 against the Miami Dolphins, Smith made 13 tackles. In Week 9 against the Buffalo Bills, Smith made 13 tackles as the Bears won the game 41–9. In Week 10 against the Detroit Lions, he made 10 tackles and sacked quarterback Matthew Stafford, while the Bears won 34–22, while also leading the team in tackles in both of these weeks. In Week 12 against the Lions, he made 11 tackles and sacked quarterback Stafford in a 23–16 win. In Week 14 against the Los Angeles Rams, Smith made six tackles and recorded his first career interception off Jared Goff and returned the ball 22 yards to the four-yard line as the Bears won 15–6. In Week 15 against the Green Bay Packers, Smith made 10 tackles in a 24–17 win. In Week 16 against the San Francisco 49ers, Smith made nine tackles and sacked Nick Mullens in a 14–9 win. On December 30, during a Week 17 game against the Minnesota Vikings, Smith had six tackles as the Bears defeated the Vikings 24–10.

On January 6, 2019, in the Bears' 15–16 loss to the Philadelphia Eagles in a Wild Card playoff game, Smith led the team with seven tackles and made an interception off Nick Foles.

Smith finished the season with 121 tackles, five sacks, five passes defended, and one interception. He was named to the PFWA All-Rookie Team. He was selected as Pro Bowl alternate.

==== 2019 ====
In Week 2 against the Denver Broncos, Smith recorded a team high 13 tackles as the Bears won 16–14. In Week 11 against the Rams, Smith recorded a team high 11 tackles and intercepted a pass thrown by Jared Goff in the 7–17 loss. In Week 13 against the Lions on Thanksgiving Day, Smith recorded a team high 15 tackles and sacked rookie quarterback David Blough twice in the 24–20 win. On December 9, 2019, Smith was placed on injured reserve after suffering a torn pectoral in Week 14. He finished the 2019 season with two sacks, 101 total tackles (66 solo), one interception, and two passes defended.

==== 2020 ====
In Week 9 against the Tennessee Titans, Smith recorded a team-high 11 tackles and sacked Ryan Tannehill once during the 24–17 loss. In Week 10 against the Vikings, Smith recorded a team-high 14 tackles and sacked Kirk Cousins once during the 13–19 loss. In Week 14 against the Houston Texans, Smith led the team with 12 tackles and two sacks during the 36–7 win.

During the Bears' 41–17 win over the Jacksonville Jaguars in Week 16, Smith intercepted Mike Glennon twice to become the first Bears player with multiple interceptions in a game since Ha Ha Clinton-Dix in 2019. Smith was also the team's first linebacker to achieve the feat since Lance Briggs in 2008. He finished the 2020 season with four sacks, 139 total tackles (98 solo), two interceptions, seven passes defended, one forced fumble, and one fumble recovery. The Bears made it back to the playoffs, for the second time in Smith's career. However, he was inactive in their appearance, a 21–9 loss against the New Orleans Saints, after suffering an elbow injury in the final game of the season.

After the season he was elected for the first time to the Sporting News first-team All-Pro team that was voted on by NFL players and executives, and to Associated Press's second-team All-Pro.

==== 2021 ====
On April 27, 2021, the Bears exercised the fifth-year option on Smith's contract, which guarantees a salary of $9.7 million for the 2022 season. On September 19, Smith intercepted a pass by Joe Burrow and returned it 53 yards for his first defensive touchdown in a 20–17 win against the Cincinnati Bengals. On November 8, Smith recorded a sack alongside 12 total tackles in a 27–29 loss which saw the Bears fall to a 3–6 record on the season. On November 21, Smith recorded a career-high total of 17 tackles, two of which were tackles for losses, in a 16–14 loss to the Baltimore Ravens. It was the most tackles by a Bears player in a single game since Brian Urlacher had 19 in 2006. Smith finished the season with one interception and 163 total tackles, the fifth-most in the NFL. He was named to NFL.com's All-Pro team and the Associated Press' second team All-Pro. He was ranked 84th by his fellow players on the NFL Top 100 Players of 2022.

==== 2022 ====
In early August 2022, Smith announced that while he tried to negotiate a contract extension during the offseason, he had requested the Bears trade him, stating the reason was that the "new front office regime doesn't value me here." Smith did report to Bears' training camp, but refused to practice. On August 20, Smith ended his holdout from practices and stated he would no longer continue negotiating with the Bears' front office for the remainder of the 2022 season. On September 25, Smith recorded 16 total tackles, two tackles for loss, and an interception, during a 23–20 win over the Texans.

=== Baltimore Ravens ===
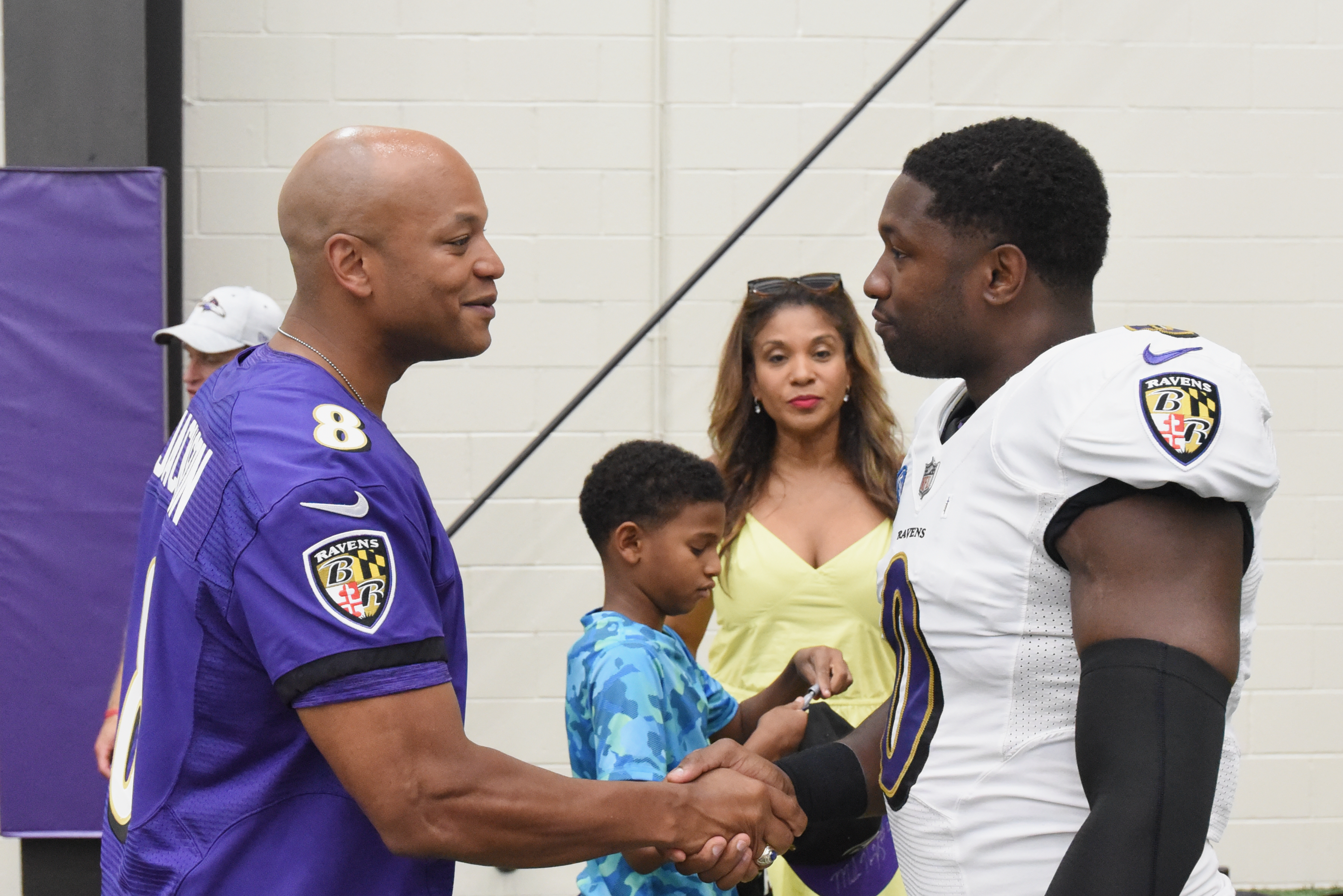
Smith shaking hands with Maryland Governor Wes Moore in 2023.

==== 2022 ====
On October 31, 2022, Smith was traded to the Ravens for A. J. Klein, a 2023 second round pick, and a 2023 fifth round pick. He was named AFC Defensive Player of the Month for December. He was named to the Pro Bowl and earned first team All-Pro honors. He finished the 2022 season with 169 total tackles (103 solo), 4.5 sacks, three interceptions, and six passes defended.

On January 10, 2023, Smith signed a five-year, $100 million extension with the Ravens, including $45 million fully guaranteed with $60 million in total guarantees, making him the highest-paid linebacker in the league. The deal was also notable because Smith does not have an agent and negotiated it himself. He was ranked 24th by his fellow players on the NFL Top 100 Players of 2023.

==== 2023 ====
In May 2023, Smith changed his number to '0', becoming the first Raven ever to wear that number. On November 12, 2023, Smith was credited with a career-high 21 tackles (14 solo) in a loss to the Cleveland Browns. He and Ray Lewis are the only Ravens in franchise history to record at least 20 tackles in a single game. Smith also became the first NFL defensive player in 2023 to record at least 20 tackles in a single game. He finished the 2023 season with 1.5 sacks, 158 total tackles (84 solo), one interception, and eight passes defended. Smith was named to his second consecutive Pro Bowl towards the end of the season. He earned first team All-Pro honors for the second straight season. He was ranked 19th by his fellow players on the NFL Top 100 Players of 2024.

==== 2024 ====
Smith was named to his third consecutive Pro Bowl on January 2, 2025. In addition, he earned first team All-Pro honors for the third consecutive season. He had 1.5 sacks, 154 total tackles (81 solo), one interception, four passes defended, one forced fumble, and one fumble recovery in the 2024 season. He was ranked 40th by his fellow players on the NFL Top 100 Players of 2025.

==== 2025 ====
In Week 2, Smith recorded 15 tackles, three tackles for a loss, and recovered a fumble and returned it 63 yards for a touchdown in a 41–17 win over the Cleveland Browns, earning AFC Defensive Player of the Week. He recorded 130 total tackles (76 solo), three passes defended, and one fumble return for a touchdown in the 2025 season.

Smith was selected to his fourth consecutive Pro Bowl in December 2025.

== Career statistics ==
Legend
**Bold**	Career high

=== NFL ===
==== Regular season ====
Year	Team	Games		Tackles						Interceptions						Fumbles				
Year	Team	GP	GS	Cmb	Solo	Ast	Sck	TFL	Sfty	PD	Int	Yds	Avg	Lng	TD	FF	Fum	FR	Yds	TD
2018	CHI	16	14	121	89	32	**5.0**	8	0	5	1	22	22.0	22	0	0	0	0	0	0
2019	CHI	12	12	101	66	35	2.0	5	0	2	1	0	0.0	0	0	0	0	0	0	0
2020	CHI	16	16	139	**98**	41	4.0	**18**	0	7	**2**	16	8.0	11	0	**1**	**1**	**1**	0	0
2021	CHI	17	17	**163**	95	68	3.0	12	0	3	1	**53**	**53.0**	**53**	**1**	0	0	0	0	0
2022	CHI	8	8	83	52	31	2.5	4	0	3	**2**	22	11.0	18	0	0	0	0	0	0
2022	BAL	9	9	86	51	35	2.0	7	0	3	1	19	19.0	19	0	0	0	0	0	0
2023	BAL	16	16	158	84	**74**	1.5	5	0	**8**	1	30	30.0	30	0	**1**	0	0	0	0
2024	BAL	16	16	154	81	73	1.5	4	0	4	1	0	0.0	0	0	**1**	0	**1**	0	0
2025	BAL	15	15	130	76	54	0.0	5	0	3	0	0	0.0	0	0	0	0	**1**	**63**	**1**
2026	BAL	5	5	42	16	26	1.0	1	0	2	1	1	1.0	1	0	1	0	0	0	0
Career		130	128	1,177	708	469	22.5	69	0	40	11	163	17.2	54	1	4	1	3	63	1

==== Postseason ====
Year	Team	Games		Tackles						Interceptions						Fumbles				
Year	Team	GP	GS	Cmb	Solo	Ast	Sck	TFL	Sfty	PD	Int	Yds	Avg	Lng	TD	FF	Fum	FR	Yds	TD
2018	CHI	1	1	7	6	1	0.0	0	0	**1**	**1**	0	0.0	0	0	0	0	0	0	0
2020	CHI	0	0	Did not play due to injury																
2022	BAL	1	1	8	3	5	0.0	0	0	0	0	0	0.0	0	0	0	0	0	0	0
2023	BAL	2	2	**23**	**10**	**13**	0.0	**2**	0	0	0	0	0.0	0	0	0	0	0	0	0
2024	BAL	2	2	13	6	7	0.0	0	0	0	0	0	0.0	0	0	0	0	0	0	0
Career		6	6	51	25	26	0.0	2	0	1	1	0	0.0	0	0	0	0	0	0	0

=== College ===
Season	Team	GP	Tackles					Interceptions				Fumbles			
Season	Team	GP	Cmb	Solo	Ast	TFL	Sck	Int	Yds	TD	PD	FF	FR	Yds	TD
2015	Georgia	10	20	9	11	1.5	0.0	0	0	0	0	0	0	0	0
2016	Georgia	13	95	52	43	5.0	0.0	0	0	0	1	**2**	**2**	0	0
2017	Georgia	15	**137**	**85**	**53**	**14.0**	**6.5**	0	0	0	**2**	1	1	0	0
Career		38	252	146	102	20.5	6.5	0	0	0	3	3	3	0	0

== Personal life ==
On May 8, 2018, nearly two weeks after being drafted, it was reported that Smith's car was burgled in Athens, Georgia, where a team-issued iPad along with some of Smith's personal belongings, including his college jerseys, helmet, and awards, were stolen from his car. However, the next day, the stolen items were recovered.
