= Antonio Cochran =

American football player (born 1976)

No. 78, 90, 94
- Position: Defensive end

Personal information
- Born: June 21, 1976 (age 50); Montezuma, Georgia, U.S.
- Listed height: 6 ft 4 in (1.93 m)
- Listed weight: 299 lb (136 kg)

Career information
- High school: Macon County (Montezuma, Georgia)
- College: Georgia
- NFL draft: 1999: 4th round, 115th overall pick

Career history
- Seattle Seahawks (1999–2004); Arizona Cardinals (2005)

Awards and highlights
- Second-team All-SEC (1998)

Career NFL statistics
- Total tackles: 201
- Sacks: 15.5
- Forced fumbles: 5
- Fumble recoveries: 3
- Interceptions: 2
- Stats at Pro Football Reference

Antonio Desez Cochran (born June 21, 1976) is an American former professional football player who played seven seasons in the National Football League (NFL). He was selected in the fourth round of the 1999 NFL draft with the 115th overall pick.

Cochran attended Macon County High School in Montezuma, Georgia. He also attended Middle Georgia College before transferring to Georgia.

Cochran signed with Florida out of HS, but attended Okaloosa-Walton on a basketball scholarship. After contributing as a part-time starter on O-W's national championship basketball team, he transferred to Middle Georgia College (MGC) to play football.
