= Willow Lake (Marshallville, Georgia) =

- U.S. National Register of Historic Places
- Location within Georgia
- Nearest city: Marshallville, Georgia
- Coordinates: 32.47654°N 83.89026°W
- Area: 960 acres (3.9 km^{2})
- Built: 1875
- Architectural style: Greek Revival, Vernacular
- MPS: Marshallville and Vicinity MRA
- NRHP reference No.: 80004449
- Added to NRHP: November 25, 1980

Willow Lake, in Macon County, Georgia near Marshallville, Georgia, is a historic house built in 1875–80. It was listed on the National Register of Historic Places in 1980. The listing included five contributing buildings on 960 acres (3.9 km^{2}).

It was here where Samuel H. Rumph developed the Elberta peach. It was his home until 1904 when he moved into town.

The Willow Lake Nursery had over 65,000 trees.
