= Ervin Baldwin =

American football player (born 1986)

No. 94
- Position: Defensive end

Personal information
- Born: August 25, 1986 (age 40); Oglethorpe, Georgia, U.S.
- Listed height: 6 ft 2 in (1.88 m)
- Listed weight: 270 lb (122 kg)

Career information
- High school: Montezuma (GA) Macon County
- College: Michigan State
- NFL draft: 2008: 7th round, 208th overall pick

Career history
- Chicago Bears (2008–2009); Indianapolis Colts (2009); Chicago Bears (2010)*; Chicago Rush (2012); Pittsburgh Power (2012)
- * Offseason or practice squad member only
- Stats at Pro Football Reference
- Stats at ArenaFan.com

Ervin Baldwin (born August 25, 1986) is an American former professional football player who was a defensive end for the Indianapolis Colts of the National Football League (NFL). He was selected by the Bears in the seventh round of the 2008 NFL draft. He played college football for the Michigan State Spartans.

== Early life ==
Baldwin was selected Region Defensive Player of the Year as a senior at Macon County High School in Montezuma, Georgia. He also garnered All-Middle Georgia honors in 2003.

== College career ==
Baldwin was an All-Big Ten selection in 2007 after starting every game (25) in his two-year Spartan career at defensive end. In 2007, he started all 13 games at DE, recording 58 tackles (27 solos) with 18.5 tackles for losses and 8.5 sacks. In 2006, he started all 12 games at the rush end and made 35 (13 solos, 22 assists) four sacks, and 6.5 tackles for losses. He was a 2005 JUCO All-American at Reedly Community College, California, and earned First-team All-California and First-team All-California Region 1 honor as a sophomore. He also was named California Region 1 and Central Valley Conference Defensive Player of the Year in 2005. He helped the Tigers win back-to-back CVC titles in 2004–05 after recording 67 tackles as a sophomore, with 27.5 tackles for losses including 14.5 sacks.

== Professional career ==
=== Chicago Bears (first stint) ===
Baldwin was a seventh-round selection (208th overall) in the 2008 NFL draft by the Chicago Bears.

=== Indianapolis Colts ===
Baldwin was signed the Colts practice squad on November 12, 2009 and promoted to the active roster on December 2, 2009. He was released by the team on September 4, 2010.

=== Chicago Bears (second stint) ===
Baldwin was signed to the practice squad of the Bears on October 20, 2010. He was released on December 7, and re-signed to the practice squad on December 9.
