= Marshallville Commercial District =

Historic district in Georgia, United States

- U.S. National Register of Historic Places
- Location within Georgia
- Location: Main St., Marshallville, Georgia
- Coordinates: 32°27′23″N 83°55′24″W
- Area: 7.5 acres (3.0 ha)
- Built: 1851
- Architectural style: Late Victorian, Romanesque
- MPS: Marshallville and Vicinity MRA
- NRHP reference No.: 80004452
- Added to NRHP: November 25, 1980

The Marshallville Commercial District in Marshallville, Georgia is a 7.5 acres (3.0 ha) historic district which was listed on the National Register of Historic Places in 1980.

It includes 15 contributing buildings and runs along Main Street in Marshallville.

All of the buildings are one- and two-story brick buildings.

It was deemed notable as "a cohesive group of Victorian commercial buildings. Although none are outstanding individually, collectively they gain significance as a well-preserved architectural group typical of rural communities."

Three more significant ones are:

- Johnson's Farm Service, formerly the Central of Georgia Depot
- Garrett's Pharmacy, formerly the Citizen's Bank
- Elberta Hotel
