= Winchester, Georgia =

Unincorporated community in Georgia, U.S.

Coordinates: 32°25′06″N 83°57′28″W

Winchester is an unincorporated community in Macon County, in the U.S. state of Georgia.

== History ==
A post office called Winchester was established in 1851, and remained in operation until 1935. The community's name most likely is a transfer from Winchester, in England.
