= Macon County Courthouse (Georgia) =

Historic courthouse in the US

- U.S. National Register of Historic Places
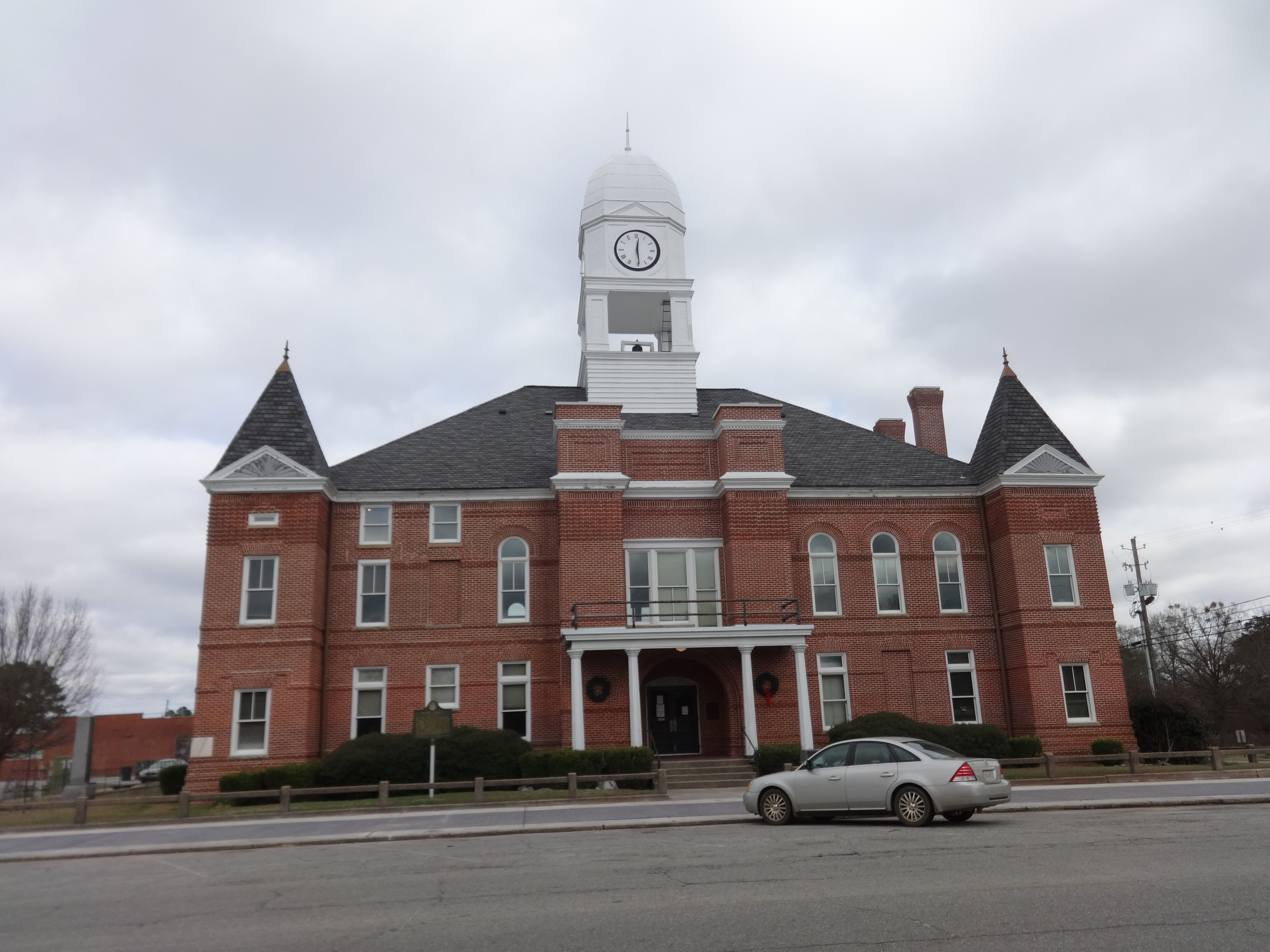

- Location within Georgia
- Location: Courthouse Sq., Oglethorpe, Georgia
- Coordinates: 32.29341°N 84.06°W
- Area: 1.5 acres (0.61 ha)
- Built: 1894
- Architectural style: Romanesque
- MPS: Georgia County Courthouses TR
- NRHP reference No.: 80001113
- Added to NRHP: September 18, 1980

Macon County Courthouse is a historic county courthouse in Oglethorpe, Georgia, county seat of Macon County. It was built in 1894. t is located in Courthouse Square. It is in the Romanesque architecture style. The facade is made of brick. The main portico seems to be a later addition. This entrance has four columns. The clock tower has several stages and contains a bell and a clock. The octagonal dome is topped with a finial. Inside, double stairways lead to the courtroom, which features a Victorian bench. The courthouse was added to the National Register of Historic Places on September 18, 1980.

== See also ==
- National Register of Historic Places listings in Macon County, Georgia
