= Montezuma, Georgia =

- City
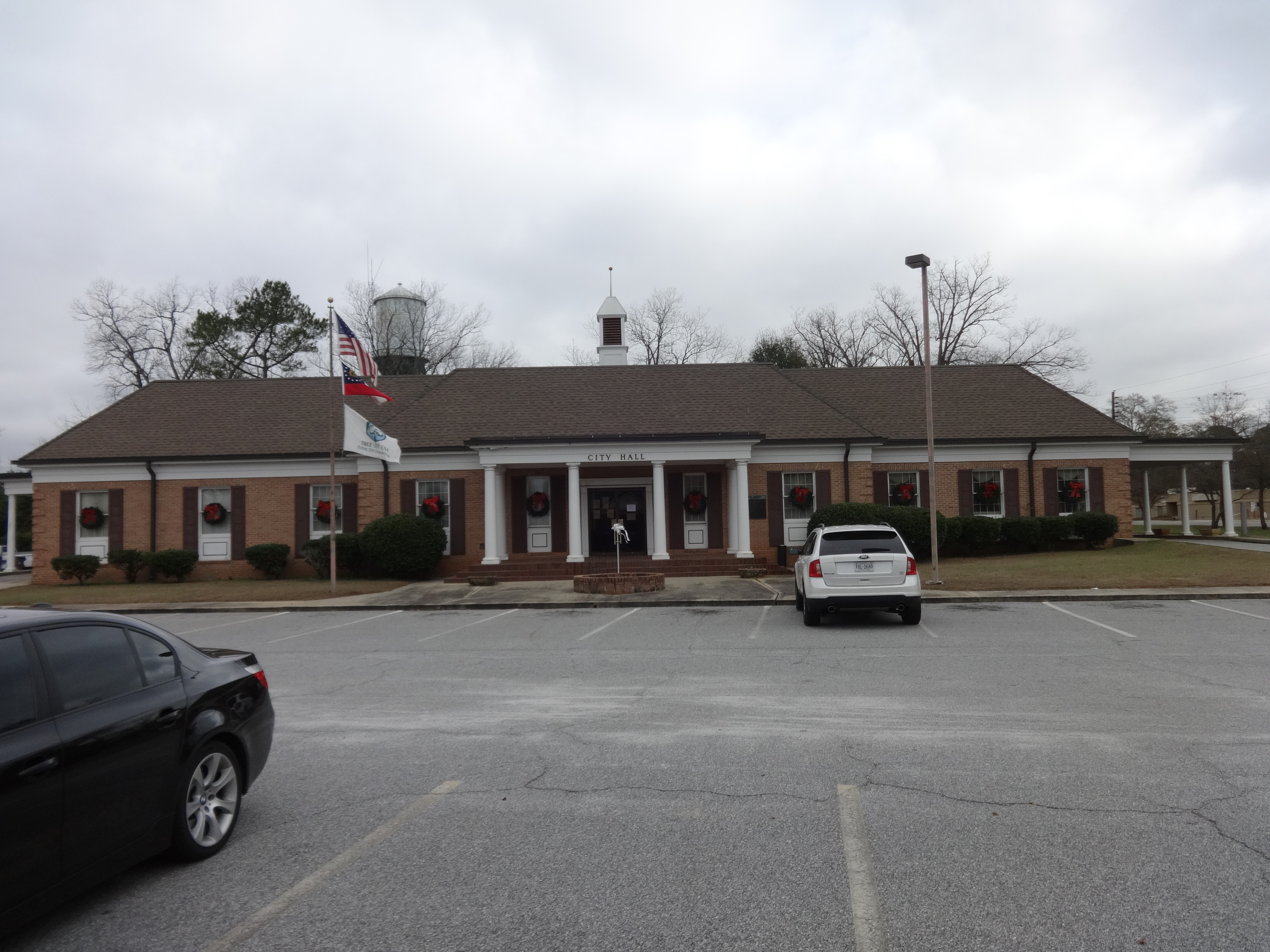
- Montezuma City Hall in Montezuma
- Motto(s): "Great future, rich past"
- Location in Macon County and the state of Georgia
- Coordinates: 32°18′10″N 84°1′38″W
- Country: United States
- State: Georgia
- County: Macon
- Named for: Moctezuma II

Area
  - Total: 4.63 sq mi (12.00 km^{2})
  - Land: 4.56 sq mi (11.82 km^{2})
  - Water: 0.069 sq mi (0.18 km^{2})
- Elevation: 364 ft (111 m)

Population (2020)
  - Total: 3,047
  - Density: 667.5/sq mi (257.73/km^{2})
- Time zone: UTC-5 (Eastern (EST))
  - Summer (DST): UTC-4 (EDT)
- ZIP code: 31063
- Area code: 478
- FIPS code: 13-52304
- GNIS feature ID: 0332410
- Website: www.montezuma-ga.org

Montezuma is a city in Macon County, Georgia (ZIP code 31063). The population was 3,047 at the 2020 census, down from 3,460 in 2010. It is home to the armory of Bravo Company, 648th Engineers of the Georgia Army National Guard.

== History ==
Montezuma had its start in 1851, when the railroad was extended to that point. The city was named after the famous Aztec leader by soldiers returning from the Mexican American War and was incorporated in 1854.

Montezuma is home to a thriving Mennonite community, founded when 10 to 15 Mennonite families moved from Virginia in the 1950s.

== Geography ==
Montezuma is in south-central Macon County, on the east side of the Flint River. It is bordered to the west across the river by Oglethorpe, the Macon county seat. Several state highways converge in Montezuma. State Route 26 (Walnut Street) passes through the south side of the city, leading east 35 miles (56 km) to Hawkinsville and west past Oglethorpe 18 miles (29 km) to Ellaville. State Route 90 passes through the center of Montezuma, leading southeast 21 miles (34 km) to Vienna and northwest 20 miles (32 km) to Rupert. State Route 49 also passes through the city center, leading northeast 13 miles (21 km) to Marshallville and southwest 11 miles (18 km) to Andersonville.

According to the United States Census Bureau, the city has a total area of 4.6 square miles (12 km^{2}), of which 0.07 square miles (0.18 km^{2}), or 1.49%, are water.

== Demographics ==
Historical population
Census	Pop.	Note	%±
1880	440		—
1890	706		60.5%
1900	903		27.9%
1910	1,630		80.5%
1920	1,827		12.1%
1930	2,284		25.0%
1940	2,346		2.7%
1950	2,921		24.5%
1960	3,744		28.2%
1970	4,125		10.2%
1980	4,830		17.1%
1990	4,506		−6.7%
2000	3,999		−11.3%
2010	3,460		−13.5%
2020	3,047		−11.9%
U.S. Decennial Census; 1850-1870 1870-1880; 1890-1910 1920-1930; 1940 1950 1960; 1970 1980 1990; 2000 2010

=== 2020 census ===
As of the 2020 census, Montezuma had a population of 3,047. The median age was 43.5 years. 22.2% of residents were under the age of 18 and 19.4% were 65 years of age or older. For every 100 females there were 85.0 males, and for every 100 females age 18 and over there were 80.2 males age 18 and over.

0.0% of residents lived in urban areas, while 100.0% lived in rural areas.

There were 1,250 households, including 898 families. Of all households, 27.7% had children under the age of 18 living in them. Of all households, 26.3% were married-couple households, 19.8% were households with a male householder and no spouse or partner present, and 48.7% were households with a female householder and no spouse or partner present. About 37.2% of all households were made up of individuals, and 14.9% had someone living alone who was 65 years of age or older.

There were 1,536 housing units, of which 18.6% were vacant. The homeowner vacancy rate was 1.9% and the rental vacancy rate was 11.1%.

Montezuma racial composition as of 2020
Race	Num.	Perc.
White (non-Hispanic)	609	19.99%
Black or African American (non-Hispanic)	2,175	71.38%
Native American	2	0.07%
Asian	91	2.99%
Pacific Islander	2	0.07%
Other/Mixed	46	1.51%
Hispanic or Latino	122	4.0%

== Education ==
Education is provided by the Macon County School District. Macon County Middle School, and Macon County High School, are both located in Montezuma.

== Notable people ==
- Jim Colzie, baseball player in the Negro leagues
- J. Griffen Greene, educator
- Roquan Smith, NFL All-Pro Linebacker for the Baltimore Ravens
- Abraham Thomas (mass murderer) Executed 1958
- Kimberly Ballard-Washington, 14th president of Savannah State University (2019 - 2023)
