= Macon County, Georgia =

County in Georgia, United States

- County
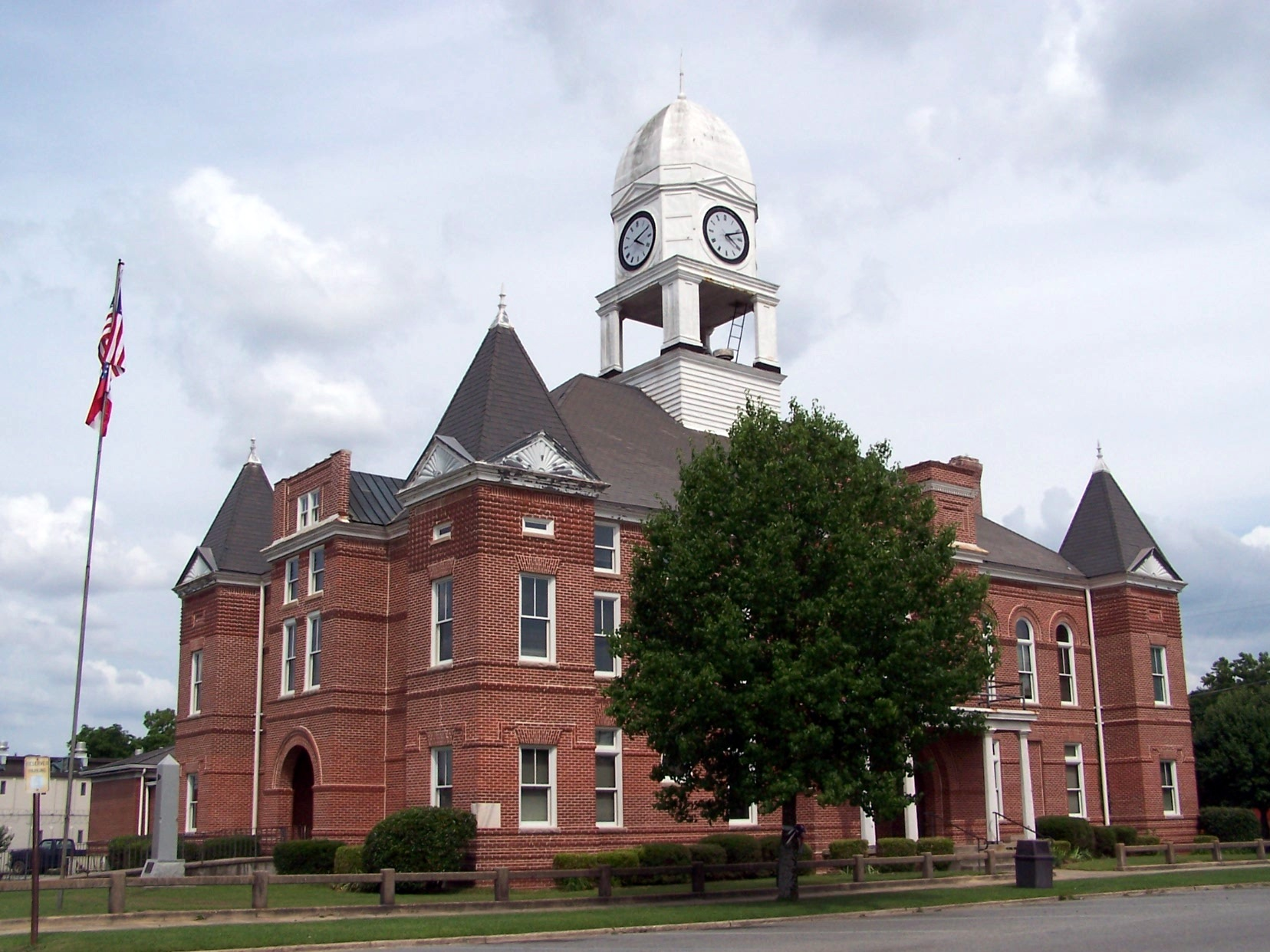
- Macon County Courthouse in Oglethorpe, Georgia

- Location within the U.S. state of Georgia
- Coordinates: 32°21′N 84°02′W
- Country: United States
- State: Georgia
- Founded: December 14, 1837; 188 years ago
- Named for: Nathaniel Macon
- Seat: Oglethorpe
- Largest city: Montezuma

Area
  - Total: 406 sq mi (1,050 km^{2})
  - Land: 401 sq mi (1,040 km^{2})
  - Water: 5.4 sq mi (14 km^{2}) 1.3%

Population (2020)
  - Total: 12,082
  - Estimate (2025): 11,756 ▼
  - Density: 30/sq mi (12/km^{2})
- Time zone: UTC−5 (Eastern)
  - Summer (DST): UTC−4 (EDT)
- Congressional district: 2nd
- Website: Macon County government

Macon County is a county located in the west central portion of the U.S. state of Georgia. As of the 2020 census, the population was 12,082. The county seat is Oglethorpe.

The Macon County Courthouse is located in Oglethorpe.

== History ==
Macon County was created in 1837 from parts of Houston ("house-ton") and Marion counties, effective December 14 of that year. The 91st county, it was named for the then-recently deceased General Nathaniel Macon of North Carolina, who served in the U.S. Congress for 37 years and ran for U.S. vice president. The city of Macon, Georgia was also named for him, but the city of Macon, Georgia, is the seat of Bibb County, a different county. The county was later reduced when parts were separated to organize Taylor and Peach counties, in 1852 and 1924, respectively.

The first county seat was not chosen until 1838, when the county's inferior court selected Lanier. The Georgia General Assembly (state legislature) designated it on December 29 of that year and incorporated it as a town.

In the 1850s, the Central of Georgia Railroad was built through Oglethorpe, changing county dynamics. As a result, the Georgia Assembly called for a referendum on moving the Macon County seat to Oglethorpe in February of both 1854 and 1856. Little is known about the first vote, but the second vote resulted in approval for a change to the county seat, and Oglethorpe was designated the following year in 1857.

During the Civil War, 13,000 Union soldiers who were prisoners of war died at the Confederate camp in Andersonville, Georgia from starvation and disease. In the late period of the war, Georgia also had difficulty supplying its own troops and people with food. Throughout the Civil War, more men on both sides died of disease than of their wounds. Commandants of the camp were prosecuted after the war for poor treatment of prisoners. The Andersonville National Cemetery, established for the many Union dead, is at the southwestern tip of the county.

The county has an active Mennonite community. The area code for Macon County is currently 478.

== Geography ==
According to the U.S. Census Bureau, the county has a total area of 406 square miles (1,050 km^{2}), of which 401 square miles (1,040 km^{2}) is land and 5.4 square miles (14 km^{2}) (1.3%) is water. The county is located in the upper Atlantic coastal plain region of the state.

Most of the southern half of Macon County, from west of Ideal to State Route 49 north of Montezuma, then running north along State Route 49 to Marshallville, and then running southeast in the direction of Unadilla, is located in the Middle Flint River sub-basin of the ACF River Basin (Apalachicola-Chattahoochee-Flint River Basin). The northern and northwestern portion of the county, from north of Marshallville heading west, is located in the Upper Flint River sub-basin of the same ACF River Basin. The northeastern corner of Macon County, east of Marshallville, is located in the Lower Ocmulgee River sub-basin of the Altamaha River basin.

=== Major highways ===
- SR 26
- SR 49
- SR 90
- SR 127
- SR 128
  - SR 128 Byp. (Oglethorpe)
- SR 224
- SR 240
- SR 329

=== Adjacent counties ===
- Peach County (northeast)
- Houston County (east)
- Dooly County (southeast)
- Sumter County (south)
- Schley County (southwest)
- Taylor County (northwest)

=== National protected area ===
- Andersonville National Historic Site (part)

== Communities ==
=== Cities ===
- Ideal
- Marshallville
- Montezuma
- Oglethorpe (county seat)

== Demographics ==
Historical population
Census	Pop.	Note	%±
1840	5,045		—
1850	7,052		39.8%
1860	8,449		19.8%
1870	11,458		35.6%
1880	11,675		1.9%
1890	13,183		12.9%
1900	14,093		6.9%
1910	15,016		6.5%
1920	17,667		17.7%
1930	16,643		−5.8%
1940	15,947		−4.2%
1950	14,213		−10.9%
1960	13,170		−7.3%
1970	12,933		−1.8%
1980	14,003		8.3%
1990	13,114		−6.3%
2000	14,074		7.3%
2010	14,740		4.7%
2020	12,082		−18.0%
2025 (est.)	11,756	▼	−2.7%
U.S. Decennial Census; 1790-1880 1890-1910; 1920-1930 1930-1940; 1940-1950 1960-1980; 1980-2000 2010 2020

=== Racial and ethnic composition ===
Macon County, Georgia – Racial and ethnic composition Note: the US Census treats Hispanic/Latino as an ethnic category. This table excludes Latinos from the racial categories and assigns them to a separate category. Hispanics/Latinos may be of any race.
Race / Ethnicity (NH = Non-Hispanic)	Pop 1980	Pop 1990	Pop 2000	Pop 2010	Pop 2020	% 1980	% 1990	% 2000	% 2010	% 2020
White alone (NH)	6,040	5,340	5,184	4,961	4,078	43.13%	40.72%	36.83%	33.66%	33.75%
Black or African American alone (NH)	7,752	7,671	8,337	8,902	7,150	55.36%	58.49%	59.24%	60.39%	59.18%
Native American or Alaska Native alone (NH)	26	15	26	19	15	0.19%	0.11%	0.18%	0.13%	0.12%
Asian alone (NH)	23	25	82	190	156	0.16%	0.19%	0.58%	1.29%	1.29%
Native Hawaiian or Pacific Islander alone (NH)	x	x	0	18	7	x	x	0.00%	0.12%	0.06%
Other race alone (NH)	10	6	9	5	20	0.07%	0.05%	0.06%	0.03%	0.17%
Mixed race or Multiracial (NH)	x	x	72	118	184	x	x	0.51%	0.80%	1.52%
Hispanic or Latino (any race)	152	57	364	527	472	1.09%	0.43%	2.59%	3.58%	3.91%
Total	14,003	13,114	14,074	14,740	12,082	100.00%	100.00%	100.00%	100.00%	100.00%

=== 2020 census ===
As of the 2020 census, the county had a population of 12,082, 4,299 households, and 3,033 families, and the median age was 41.7 years.

17.7% of residents were under the age of 18 and 19.0% were 65 years of age or older, with 118.6 males for every 100 females and 122.5 males for every 100 females age 18 and over. 0.0% of residents lived in urban areas, while 100.0% lived in rural areas.

The racial makeup of the county was 34.4% White, 59.3% Black or African American, 0.3% American Indian and Alaska Native, 1.3% Asian, 0.1% Native Hawaiian and Pacific Islander, 2.7% from some other race, and 2.0% from two or more races. Hispanic or Latino residents of any race comprised 3.9% of the population.

There were 4,299 households, of which 27.1% had children under the age of 18 living with them and 38.9% had a female householder with no spouse or partner present. About 34.0% of all households were made up of individuals and 15.5% had someone living alone who was 65 years of age or older.

There were 5,109 housing units, of which 15.9% were vacant. Among occupied housing units, 64.4% were owner-occupied and 35.6% were renter-occupied. The homeowner vacancy rate was 1.0% and the rental vacancy rate was 8.9%.

== Politics ==
Macon County is a long-time Democratic stronghold. The last Republican to win the county was Nixon in 1972, and since then it has been won by Democrats by comfortable margins. After 1972, no Republican, until Donald Trump in 2024, was able to reach even 40% of the vote.

For elections to the United States House of Representatives, Macon County is part of Georgia's 2nd congressional district, currently represented by Sanford Bishop. For elections to the Georgia State Senate, Macon County is part of District 15. For elections to the Georgia House of Representatives, Macon County is part of District 150.

United States presidential election results for Macon County, Georgia
Year	Republican		Democratic		Third party(ies)	
Year	No.	%	No.	%	No.	%
1912	85	16.50%	411	79.81%	19	3.69%
1916	97	17.38%	440	78.85%	21	3.76%
1920	68	12.34%	483	87.66%	0	0.00%
1924	52	6.93%	649	86.53%	49	6.53%
1928	258	23.96%	819	76.04%	0	0.00%
1932	55	3.67%	1,438	96.06%	4	0.27%
1936	92	8.74%	958	90.98%	3	0.28%
1940	72	7.76%	852	91.81%	4	0.43%
1944	168	15.89%	889	84.11%	0	0.00%
1948	127	10.74%	675	57.11%	380	32.15%
1952	319	17.81%	1,472	82.19%	0	0.00%
1956	363	15.47%	1,984	84.53%	0	0.00%
1960	438	22.74%	1,488	77.26%	0	0.00%
1964	1,723	61.56%	1,076	38.44%	0	0.00%
1968	598	19.22%	954	30.67%	1,559	50.11%
1972	2,005	70.55%	837	29.45%	0	0.00%
1976	638	17.47%	3,013	82.53%	0	0.00%
1980	894	22.47%	3,025	76.02%	60	1.51%
1984	1,515	37.54%	2,521	62.46%	0	0.00%
1988	1,412	38.19%	2,268	61.35%	17	0.46%
1992	944	24.80%	2,491	65.45%	371	9.75%
1996	1,006	26.54%	2,618	69.06%	167	4.41%
2000	1,566	35.96%	2,757	63.31%	32	0.73%
2004	1,851	38.72%	2,906	60.79%	23	0.48%
2008	1,712	34.35%	3,251	65.23%	21	0.42%
2012	1,545	32.28%	3,211	67.09%	30	0.63%
2016	1,540	35.92%	2,705	63.10%	42	0.98%
2020	1,783	38.24%	2,858	61.29%	22	0.47%
2024	1,916	40.89%	2,755	58.79%	15	0.32%

United States Senate election results for Macon County, Georgia2
Year	Republican		Democratic		Third party(ies)	
Year	No.	%	No.	%	No.	%
2020	1,787	38.91%	2,727	59.37%	79	1.72%
2020	1,599	37.51%	2,664	62.49%	0	0.00%

United States Senate election results for Macon County, Georgia3
Year	Republican		Democratic		Third party(ies)	
Year	No.	%	No.	%	No.	%
2020	823	18.06%	1,987	43.60%	1,747	38.34%
2020	1,591	37.21%	2,685	62.79%	0	0.00%
2022	1,460	38.82%	2,269	60.33%	32	0.85%
2022	1,361	38.38%	2,185	61.62%	0	0.00%

Georgia Gubernatorial election results for Macon County
Year	Republican		Democratic		Third party(ies)	
Year	No.	%	No.	%	No.	%
2022	1,551	41.05%	2,209	58.47%	18	0.48%

== In popular culture ==
Macon County has been an important setting for season 4 of AMC's hit TV show, The Walking Dead. Macon County was a shooting place for the 2013 movie, The Hunger Games: Catching Fire. The Mountain Goats reference Macon County, Georgia in their song, "Going to Georgia".

== See also ==
- National Register of Historic Places listings in Macon County, Georgia
- List of counties in Georgia
