= Marshallville, Georgia =

- City
- Location in Macon County and the state of Georgia
- Coordinates: 32°27′12″N 83°56′32″W
- Country: United States
- State: Georgia
- County: Macon

Area
  - Total: 3.16 sq mi (8.18 km^{2})
  - Land: 3.12 sq mi (8.09 km^{2})
  - Water: 0.031 sq mi (0.08 km^{2})
- Elevation: 515 ft (157 m)

Population (2020)
  - Total: 1,048
  - Density: 335.5/sq mi (129.52/km^{2})
- Time zone: UTC-5 (Eastern (EST))
  - Summer (DST): UTC-4 (EDT)
- ZIP code: 31057
- Area code: 478
- FIPS code: 13-49924
- GNIS feature ID: 0356378
- Website: www.cityofmarshallville.org

Marshallville is a city in Macon County, Georgia, United States. The population was 1,048 at the 2020 census, down from 1,448 in 2010.

== History ==
Marshallville was founded in the 1820s. It was incorporated as a town in 1854 and as a city in 1953.

== Geography ==
Marshallville is in northeastern Macon County. Georgia State Routes 49 and 127 pass through the city. SR 49 leads southwest 13 miles (21 km) to Montezuma, the largest city in the county, and north 8 miles (13 km) to Fort Valley. SR 127 goes southwest out of town with SR 49 but then leads west 21 miles (34 km) to Rupert, while to the east it leads 13 miles (21 km) to Perry.

According to the United States Census Bureau, Marshallville has a total area of 3.2 square miles (8.3 km^{2}), of which 0.03 square miles (0.08 km^{2}), or 1.01%, are water.

== Demographics ==
Historical population
Census	Pop.	Note	%±
1870	424		—
1880	543		28.1%
1890	1,086		100.0%
1900	879		−19.1%
1910	1,082		23.1%
1920	1,150		6.3%
1930	931		−19.0%
1940	905		−2.8%
1950	1,121		23.9%
1960	1,308		16.7%
1970	1,376		5.2%
1980	1,540		11.9%
1990	1,457		−5.4%
2000	1,335		−8.4%
2010	1,448		8.5%
2020	1,048		−27.6%
U.S. Decennial Census; 1850-1870 1870-1880; 1890-1910 1920-1930; 1940 1950 1960; 1970 1980 1990; 2000 2010

=== 2020 census ===
As of the 2020 census, Marshallville had a population of 1,048. The median age was 45.3 years. 20.7% of residents were under the age of 18 and 21.1% were 65 years of age or older. For every 100 females, there were 76.7 males, and for every 100 females age 18 and over there were 74.6 males age 18 and over.

0.0% of residents lived in urban areas, while 100.0% lived in rural areas.

Marshallville racial composition as of 2020
Race	Num.	Perc.
White (non-Hispanic)	200	19.08%
Black or African American (non-Hispanic)	814	77.67%
Native American	1	0.1%
Asian	1	0.1%
Pacific Islander	1	0.1%
Other/Mixed	17	1.62%
Hispanic or Latino	14	1.34%

There were 470 households, including 309 families, in Marshallville. Of those households, 28.1% had children under the age of 18 living in them. 27.7% were married-couple households, 22.3% had a male householder with no spouse or partner present, and 47.0% had a female householder with no spouse or partner present. About 36.1% of all households were made up of individuals, and 15.7% had someone living alone who was 65 years of age or older.

There were 532 housing units, of which 11.7% were vacant. The homeowner vacancy rate was 1.4% and the rental vacancy rate was 4.9%.
