= John L. Mostiler =

American politician

Member of the Georgia House of Representatives from the 71-2 district
- In office 1975–1983
- Succeeded by: J. Neal Shepard Jr.

Member of the Georgia House of Representatives from the 75th district
- In office 1983–1989
- Preceded by: Neal Jackson
- Succeeded by: John P. Yates

Personal details
- Born: March 9, 1923 Spartanburg, South Carolina, U.S.
- Died: December 17, 1994 (aged 71) Griffin, Georgia, U.S.
- Party: Democratic
- Spouse: Nora Elizabeth Morgan
- Children: 2
- Education: North Carolina State University

John L. Mostiler (March 9, 1923 – December 17, 1994) was an American politician. He served as a Democratic member for the 71-2 and 75th district of the Georgia House of Representatives.

== Life and career ==
Born in Spartanburg, South Carolina, Mostiler attended North Carolina State University, where he earned his Bachelor of Science degree in 1950. He served in the United States Air Force during World War II.

In 1975, Mostiler won the election for the 71-2 district of the Georgia House of Representatives, succeeding J. Neal Shepard Jr. and serving until 1983. That year he succeeded Neal Jackson for the 75th district of the Georgia House of Representatives. In 1989, he was succeeded by John P. Yates.

Mostiler died in December 1994 in Griffin, Georgia, at the age of 71. He was buried in Oak Hill Cemetery.
