= List of former members of the Georgia State Senate =

The following is a list of former members of the Georgia State Senate (1789–present) and the prior Executive Council (1777–1789).

== List ==
Member	Time in office	District	County	Party
Richard Walker	1820–1822	Appling	Appling	
Samuel E. Swilley	1823–1825	Appling	Appling	
Turby F. Thomas	1826–1832	Appling	Appling	
Benjamin Leggett	1833–1836	Appling	Appling	
Seaborn Hall	1837, 1841–1842	Appling	Appling	
Thomas Hall	1838	Appling	Appling	
William Roberuon	1839–1840	Appling	Appling	
Joseph L. Robinson	1843	Appling	Appling	
Jacob Moody	1845	6th	Appling,	
John McArthur	1847	6th	Appling,	
Daniel F. McRae	1849–1850	6th	Appling,	
John McRae	1851–1852	6th	Appling,	
J. Reddish	1853-1856	Appling	Appling	
John Bennett	1857–1858; 1863–1865	Appling (1st term), 3rd (2nd term)	Appling (1st term); Appling, (2nd term)	
John G. Ritch	1859–1860	Appling	Appling	
H. R. Fort	1861–1863	3rd	Appling,	
Silas Overstreet	1865–1866	3rd	Appling,	
Elisha D. Graham	1868–1869	3rd	Appling,	
Merritt Henderson	1870	3rd	Appling,	
John C. Nicholls	1871–1874	3rd	Appling,	
Daniel G. Hopps	1875–1877	3rd	Appling,	
Gideon J. Holton	1878–1879	3rd	Appling,	
Lemuel Johnson	1880–1881, 1884–1885	3rd	Appling,	
S. R. Harris	1882–1883; 1888–1889; 1894–1895	3rd	Appling,	
W. G. Brantley	1886–1887	3rd	Appling,	
Henry A. Brnnrtt	1890–1891	3rd	Appling,	
E. M. Crawford	1892–1893	3rd	Appling,	
Philip Hovis Comas	1896–1897; 1902–1904	3rd	Appling,	
James R. Dowling	1898–1899	3rd	Appling,	
R. B. Hopps	1900–1901	3rd	Appling,	
E. Lawton Walker	1905–1906	3rd	Appling,	
W. H. Whaley	1907–1908	3rd	Appling,	
Alvin V. Sellen	1909–1910	3rd	Appling,	
John A. Cromartie	1911–1912	3rd	Appling,	
G. W. Taylor	1913–1914; 1921–1922	3rd (1st term), 46th (2nd term)	Appling, Bacon (1st term); Bacon, (2nd term)	
James R. Thomas	1915–1917	3rd	Appling, Bacon	
James B. Moore	1917–1918	3rd	Appling, Bacon	
Z. W. Kirkand	1919–1920	3rd	Appling,	
James R. Thomas	1921–1922	3rd	Appling,	
Charles Henry Parker	1923–1924	3rd	Appling,	
John Gordon Knox	1925–1926	3rd	Appling,	
William Sedric Courson	1927	3rd	Appling,	
Aaron James Nichols	1929–1931	3rd	Appling,	
Wade Hampton Watson	1931	3rd	Appling,	
John Gordon Knox	1933	3rd	Appling,	
Joel Marvin Strickland	1935	3rd	Appling,	
Joel Price Shedd	1937–1938; 1945–1946	3rd	Appling,	
James Thomas Holt	1939–1940; 1953–1954; 1959–1960	3rd (1st term); 54th (2nd and 3rd term)	Appling,	
Samuel Wright Martin	1941–1942	3rd	Appling,	
William Harley Jones	1943–1944	3rd	Appling,	
William Clarence Parker	1947–1948	54th	Appling,	
Lawton R. Ursrey	1949–1950; 1955–1956	54th	Appling,	
A. G. Olliver	1951–1952	54th	Appling,	
Wilton Hill	1957–1958	54th	Appling,	
Gordon Knox, Jr.	1961–1962	54th	Appling,	
William A. Zorn	1963–1964	6th	Appling, Bacon,	
Roscoe Dean	1965–1972	6th	Appling, Bacon	
Joe Kennedy	1972–1990	4th	Appling,	
Frank Eldridge	1965–1982	7th	Appling, Atkinson, Bacon,	
Robert G. Dickerson	1917–1918	5th	Atkinson,	
J. E. T. Bowden	1919–1920	5th	Atkinson,	
Dan Wall	1921–1922	5th	Atkinson,	
Henry C. Morgan	1923–1924	5th	Atkinson,	
Henry Jones Carswell	1925–1926	5th	Atkinson,	
Bertram Godwin Oberry	1927	5th	Atkinson,	
George Melancthon Dame	1929–1931	5th	Atkinson,	
John William Bennett	1931	5th	Atkinson,	
Jesse S. Morris	1933	5th	Atkinson,	
Frank M. Dickerson	1935	5th	Atkinson,	
Jack Williams	1937–1938; 1943–1944	5th	Atkinson,	
Hiram Franklin Sears	1939–1940	5th	Atkinson,	
Alfonso Leo Barnhill	1941–1942	5th	Atkinson,	
Abe T. Minchew	1945–1946	5th	Atkinson,	
Iris Faircloth Blitch	1947–1948; 1953–1954	5th	Atkinson,	
Sam T. Wright	1949–1950	5th	Atkinson,	
L. A. Hargreaves	1951–1952	5th	Atkinson,	
William King Ponsell	1955–1956; 1961–1962	5th	Atkinson,	
Waldo Henderson	1957–1958	5th	Atkinson,	
Wallace L. Jernigan	1959–1960	5th	Atkinson,	Democratic
Talmadge McKinnon	1963–1964	7th	Atkinson,	
John Knox Larkins	1919–1920	46th	Bacon,	
E. L. Grantham	1923–1924	46th	Bacon,	
Samuel Forster Memory	1925–1926	46th	Bacon,	
Walter Bennett	1927	46th	Bacon,	
J. C. Brewer	1929–1931	46th	Bacon,	
James O. Waters	1931	46th	Bacon,	
Andrew Jackson Tuten	1933	46th	Bacon,	
J. Henry Milhollin	1935; 1941–1942	46th	Bacon,	
Lee Smith Purdom	1937–1938; 1949–1950	46th	Bacon,	
Homer Lee Causey	1939–1940; 1945–1946	46th	Bacon,	
Lewis Hardeman Oden	1943–1944	46th	Bacon,	
Eddie Columbus Wideinan	1947–1948	46th	Bacon,	
H. Dorsey Deen	1951–1952; 1957–1958	46th	Bacon,	
Charles M. Sims	1953–1954	46th	Bacon,	
O. W. Raulerson	1955–1956	46th	Bacon,	
Noah E. Holton Sr.	1959–1960	46th	Bacon,	
O. D. Johnson	1961–1962	46th	Bacon,	
John S. Porter	1826–1830	Baker	Baker	
Martin Miller	1831	Baker	Baker	
Samuel Howard	1832–1833	Baker	Baker	
Thomas J. Holmes	1834–1841	Baker	Baker	
John Colley	1842–1843; 1845	Baker (1st tenure); 13th	Baker (1st tenure); Baker, (2nd tenure)	
William J. Johnson	1847	13th	Baker,	
Richard H. Clark	1849–1850; 1853–1854	13th (1st term); Baker (2nd term)	Baker, (1st term); Baker (2nd term)	
Benjamin L. Wolf	1851–1852	13th	Baker,	
J. G. Sapp	1855–1856	Baker	Baker	
Charles D. Hammond	1857–1858; 1863–1865	Baker (1st tenure); 9th (2nd tenure)	Baker (1st tenure); Baker, (2nd tenure)	
Gazaway D. Lamar	1859–1860	Baker	Baker	
S. S. Stafford	1861–1863	9th	Baker,	
James Dickey	1865–1866	9th	Baker,	
R. T. Nesbitt	1868–1870	9th	Baker,	
Reuben Jones	1871–1874; 1892	9th	Baker,	
Theodore J. Perry	1875–1877	9th	Baker,	
Euzema C. Bower	1878–1879	9th	Baker,	
A. L. Hawes	1880–1881	9th	Baker,	
O. II. Paull	1882–1883	9th	Baker,	
Henry C. Sheffield	1884–1885	9th	Baker,	
I. H. Hand	1886–1887	9th	Baker,	
C. B. Woolen	1888–1889	9th	Baker,	
R. H. Lanier	1890–1891	9th	Baker,	
Thomas W. Fleming	1892–1893	9th	Baker,	
J. E. Mercer	1894–1895	9th	Baker,	
W. C. Sheffield	1896–1897	9th	Baker,	
Robert Benton Odum	1898–1899	9th	Baker,	
J. L. Boynton	1900–1901; 1905–1906	9th	Baker,	
T. E. Hightower	1902–1904	9th	Baker,	
J. S. Cowart	1907–1908	9th	Baker,	
T. B. McDowell	1909–1910	9th	Baker,	
Robert E. L. Spence	1911–1912	9th	Baker,	
Elsie Leonard Smith	1913–1914	9th	Baker,	
W. A. Buchanan	1915–1917	9th	Baker,	
J. C. Odom	1917–1918	9th	Baker,	
Z. T. Rabun	1919–1920	9th	Baker,	
Robert Howard Sheffield	1921–1922	9th	Baker,	
Albert Norman McLeod	1923–1924	9th	Baker,	
Alexander Lee Miller	1925–1926	9th	Baker,	
John D. Haddock	1927	9th	Baker,	
Willie James Kidd	1929–1931	9th	Baker,	
William Thomas Adkins	1931	9th	Baker,	
George Marvin Sparks	1933	9th	Baker,	
Albert Norman McLeod	1935	9th	Baker,	
Jerome M. Clements	1937–1938	9th	Baker,	
John Oscar Bridges	1939–1940	9th	Baker,	
Benton Odom Jr.	1941–1942	9th	Baker,	
Jerome Marcelous Clements	1943–1944	9th	Baker,	
William Henry Wall	1945–1946; 1951–1952	9th	Baker,	
Mrs. Benton Odom	1947–1948	9th	Baker,	
Frank Lunsford	1949–1950	9th	Baker,	
John B. Hall	1953–1954	9th	Baker,	
Charles E. Dews	1955–1956	9th	Baker,	
William Mobley Howell	1957–1958	9th	Baker,	
Mack C. Screws	1959–1960	9th	Baker,	
Charles E. Dews	1961–1962	9th	Baker,	
Julian Webb	1963–1972	11th	Baker,	
Michael N. Herndon	1973–1974	10th	Baker,	
Henry P. Russell Jr.	1975–1978	10th	Baker,	
Standish Thompson	1965–1967	34th	Fulton	Republican
E. Earl Patton	1969–1970	40th	Fulton	Republican
Carl Sanders	1956–1962	18th	Glasscock	Democratic
Jimmy Carter	1963–1967	14th	Chattahoochee, Quitman, Randolph, Stewart, Sumter, Terrell, Webster	Democratic
Roscoe E. Dean	1965–1978	6th		Democratic
Ford Spinks	1962–1971			Democratic
Frank Eldridge Jr.	1965–1982	7th		Democratic
Julian Webb	1963–1974	11th		Democratic
Horace Ward	1965–1974			Democratic
Leroy Johnson	1963–1975	38th		Democratic
Zell Miller	1961–1963; 1963–1965	40th; 50th		Democratic
Johnny Isakson	1993–1997	21st		Republican
Michael J. Egan	1989–2001	40th		Republican
Joseph Tribble	1963–1966	3rd	Chatham	Republican
Oliver Bateman	1964–1972	27th	Bibb	Republican
Dan MacIntyre	1963–1969	40th	Fulton	Republican
A. Perry Gordy	1963–1965	15th	Muscogee	Republican
Ivey William Gregory	1965–1969	15th	Muscogee	Republican
Charles William Kiker	1935–1936; 1941–1942; 1947–1948; 1953–1954	41st	Fannin	Republican
C. James Roper	1957–1959	41st	Fannin	Republican
Charles Emerson Waters	1955–1957; 1961–1963	41st	Fannin	Republican
Reese Samuel Thomas	1963–1965	54th	Whitfield	Republican
Duncan Ray	1826–29, 1831		Thomas	
Michael Young	1830		Thomas	
James A. Newman	1832–35		Thomas	
William H. Reynolds	1836–37		Thomas	
Henry Heath	1838–39		Thomas	
Thomas E. Blackshear	1840–42		Thomas	
Richard Mitchell	1843		Thomas	
Richard Mitchell	1845	12th	Thomas	
Martin H. Martin	1847	12th	Thomas	
Peter E. Love	1849–50	12th	Thomas	
John P. Dickinson	1851–52	12th	Thomas	
G. W. Brown	1853–54		Thomas	
W. Ponder	1855–56		Thomas	Democratic
J. C. Browning	1857–58		Thomas	
James L. Seward	1859–60		Thomas	
