= Georgia's 41st Senate district =

Georgia's 41st State Senate district
Senator
Kim Jackson; D
- Demographics: 23.28%% White; 58.46%% Black; 9.14%% Hispanic; 8.96%% Asian; 1.57%% Native American; 0.11%% Hawaiian/Pacific Islander
- Population (2020) • Voting age: 193,109; 147,908

District 41 of the Georgia Senate is located in eastern Metro Atlanta.

Former occupants of the seat include Steve Henson, former Democratic Senate minority leader.

== List of senators ==
Member	Party	Years	Residence	Electoral history	Counties
Charles William Kiker	Republican	1935–1936 1941–1942 1947–1948 1953–January 10, 1955			
Charles Emerson Waters	Republican	January 10, 1955 – January 14, 1957			
C. James Roper	Republican	January 14, 1957 – January 12, 1959			Pickens, Fannin, and Gilmer
Charles William Kiker	Republican	January 12, 1959 – January 9, 1961			
Charles Emerson Waters	Republican	January 9, 1961 – January 14, 1963			
H. E. "Gene" Sanders	Republican	– 1967	Clarkston		
H. McKinley Conway	Republican	1967 – 1969	Atlanta		
Jim Tysinger	Republican	1969 – January 11, 1999	Atlanta		
Bart Ladd	Republican	January 11, 1999 – January 13, 2003			
Steve Henson	Democratic	January 2003 – January 11, 2021		Retired.	
Kim Jackson	Democratic	January 11, 2021 – present			
