= St. Mary's Railroad =

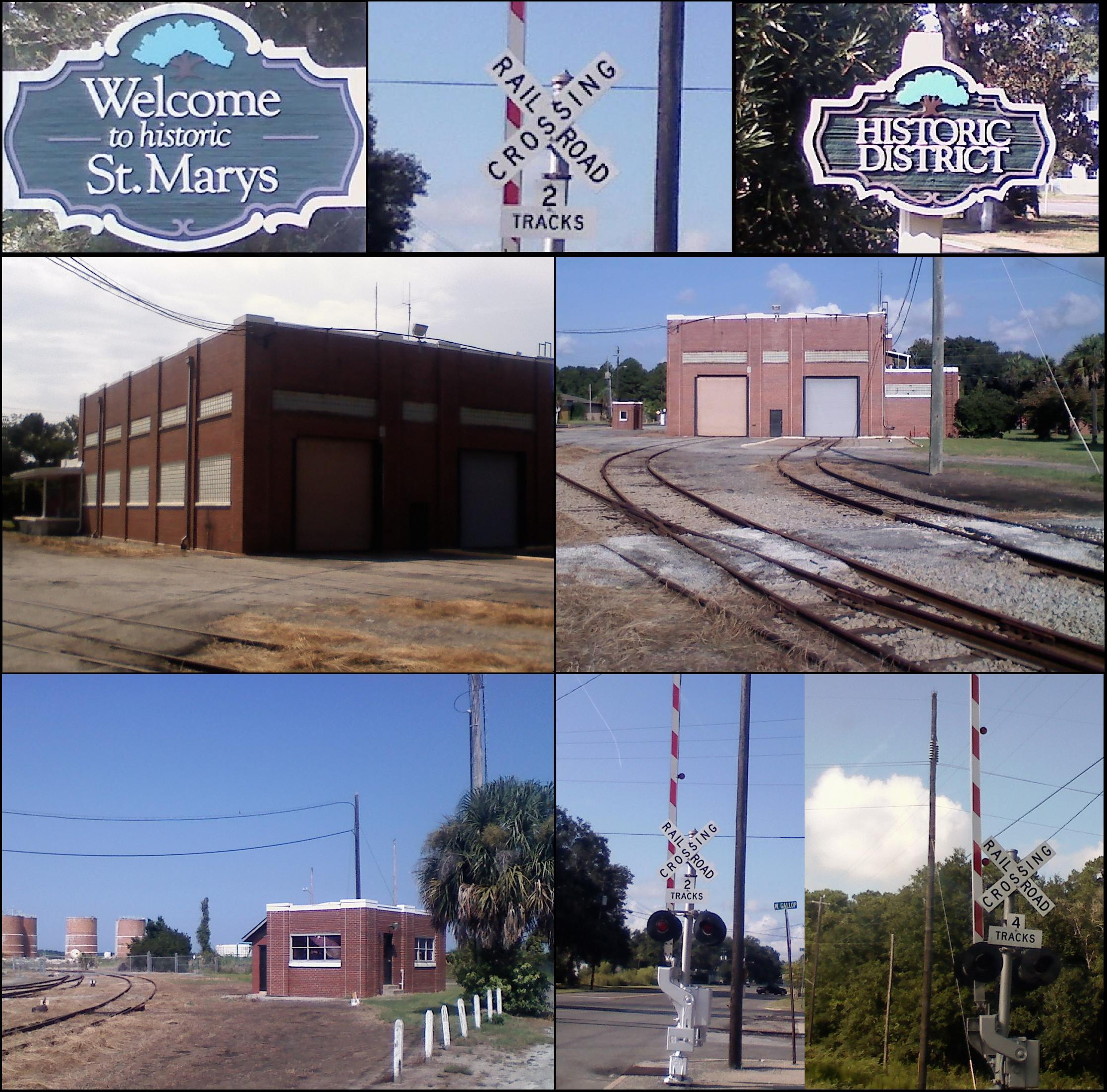
Property of the St. Marys Railroad off of Osborne Street, St. Marys, GA

The St. Marys Railroad (reporting mark SM) is a class III railroad operating in Georgia United States.

== History ==
The St. Mary's and Kingsland Railroad, incorporated on October 24, 1906, was founded in 1865 by Captain Lemuel Johnson. It received its charter from the state of Georgia, and its first two locomotives purchased were #207 and #308.

The SM&K eventually became the Atlantic, Waycross and Northern Railroad. After the death of Johnson in 1918, the railroad was sold to the Southern Fertilizer and Chemical Company in Savannah, Georgia, with the sale being completed on January 24, 1918. The AW&N was sold in 1939 to Gilman Paper Company-St. Marys Kraft Corporation and became the St. Marys Railroad. The SM purchased its first diesel locomotive #500 in 1945 which was nicknamed the "Goat." Ten years later the railroad constructed a 4-mile spur to service the US Army's Kings Bay ammunition storage facility which is now the Naval Submarine Base Kings Bay.

The SM was merged into the Gilman Paper Company on January 11, 1999, and operated initially under the Gilman name. The Gilman Paper Company separated the railroad by establishing a limited liability corporation operating under the name of Saint Marys Railroad, LLC. On December 17, 1999, the paper plant and railroad were purchased by the Durango Paper Company (changing its name in 2000 to the Durango-Georgia Company) and the railroad was renamed the Durango Railroad. All federal reporting requirements for the railroad were filed under that name. The company declined to change its reporting marks however, thus the locomotives and rolling stock continued to use the St. Marys Railroad name.

The Durango Paper Company closed its doors in 2002 after two industrial accidents at the plant resulted in nearly $200,000 in fines from OSHA. All employees of the paper plant lost their jobs, putting the future of the railroad in doubt. The railroad continues to operate and the St. Marys Railroad right-of-way and assets remain intact. The railroad has always maintained its own locomotives and cars with a fully equipped shop facility in St. Marys.

In January 2007, the St. Marys Railroad, LLC was purchased by the Birmingham, Alabama-based Boatright Companies. The railroad continues to be fully operational with no change in its reporting marks.

== Current ==
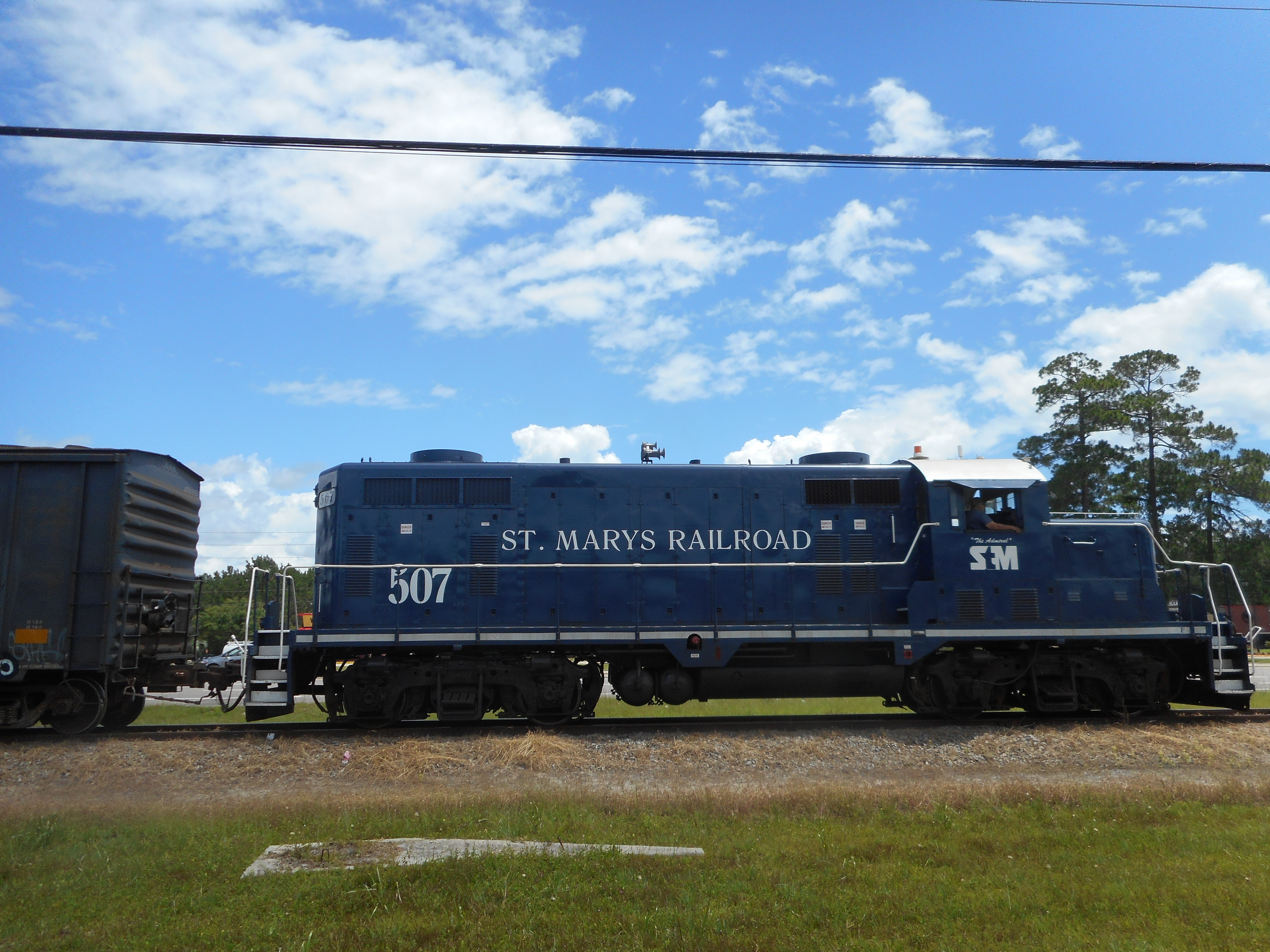
Locomotive 507 pulls a freight train in Kingsland, GA, in June 2016

Currently the St. Marys Railroad leases two locomotives; ex-NS 2379 (MP15DC, built as SOU 2379) and ex-NS 2389 (MP15DC, ex-SOU 2389). Annually, St. Marys Railroad moves approximately 1100 carloads of freight and 2000 railcars placed in and out of storage.

== Interchanges ==
The only connection to other railroads along the 11 mile route is to the First Coast Railroad at Kingsland.

== See also ==
- Georgia Coastal Railway
