= Lemuel Johnson =

Lemuel Johnson may refer to:

- Lemuel Adolphus Johnson, Sierra Leonean professor
- Lemuel Johnson (politician), American judge and politician
