= Daniel Gibson Hopps =

American politician (1814–1892)

Daniel Gibson Hopps (October 31, 1814-1892) was a state legislator in Georgia. He served in the Georgia House of Representatives and Georgia Senate. He represented Appling County.

He was born in Wayne County, Georgia the son of Richard Hopps and Margaret Gibson. He was named for his maternal grandfather Daniel Gibson.

He represented the Third Senatorial District in 1875.

== See also ==
- List of former members of the Georgia State Senate
