= Walter G. Andrews =

American politician (1889–1949)

Walter Gresham Andrews
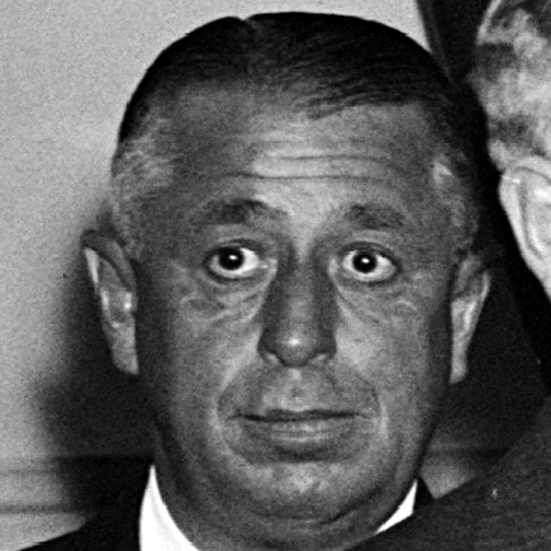

Member of the U.S. House of Representatives from New York
- In office March 4, 1931 – January 3, 1949
- Preceded by: S. Wallace Dempsey
- Succeeded by: William L. Pfeiffer
- Constituency: 40th district (1931–45); 42nd district (1945–49)

Personal details
- Born: July 16, 1889 Evanston, Illinois, U.S.
- Died: March 5, 1949 (aged 59) Daytona Beach, Florida, U.S.
- Party: Republican
- Education: Princeton University
- Profession: Football coach; politician; businessman
- Awards: Distinguished Service Cross

Military service
- Branch/service: United States Army
- Rank: Major
- Unit: Troop I, First New York Cavalry (1916); Machine Gun Group, First New York Cavalry (1917); 127th United States Infantry, 27th division (1917)
- Battles/wars: World War I

Walter Gresham Andrews (July 16, 1889 – March 5, 1949) was an American politician and a Republican member of the United States House of Representatives from New York.

== Biography ==
Andrews was born in Evanston, Illinois, the son of William Henry and Kate (Gresham) Andrews; his grandfather and namesake was U.S. Secretary of State Walter Q. Gresham. He attended the public schools of Buffalo, New York, graduated from Lawrenceville School in 1908 and from Princeton Law School in 1913.

== Career ==
Andrews was head coach of the Princeton Tigers football team in 1913.

During World War I, he served on the Mexican border as a private, Troop I, First New York Cavalry, in 1916. Commissioned second lieutenant, he was with the Machine Gun Group, First New York Cavalry, in 1917. He served in France with the 107th Infantry Regiment, Twenty-seventh Division, and was promoted to major. In 1918, he was wounded in an attack on the Hindenberg Line. He was awarded the Distinguished Service Cross.

After the war, Andrews was employed as superintendent and central sales manager, Pratt & Lambert, Inc., Buffalo, New York, until 1925.

He was supervisor of the fifteenth federal census for the seventh district of New York in 1929 and 1930, and director of the Buffalo General Hospital.

Elected to Congress in 1930, Andrews served from March 4, 1931, until January 3, 1945, for the 40th District; and from January 3, 1945, to January 3, 1949, for the 42nd District. He was chairman of the United States House Committee on Armed Services, during the 80th United States Congress. He was not a candidate for renomination, due to physicians advising him to take things easier.

== Death ==
Andrews died in a hotel at Daytona Beach, Florida, from a heart attack on March 5, 1949 (age 59 years, 232 days). He was cremated, and his ashes are interred at Old Fort Niagara Cemetery, Youngstown, New York.

== Head coaching record ==
Year	Team	Overall	Conference	Standing	Bowl/playoffs
Princeton Tigers (Independent) (1913)
1913	Princeton	5–2–1			
Princeton:		5–2–1			
Total:		5–2–1			

U.S. House of Representatives
Preceded by S. Wallace Dempsey	Member of the U.S. House of Representatives from New York's 40th congressional district 1931–1945	Succeeded by George F. Rogers
Preceded by John Cornelius Butler	Member of the U.S. House of Representatives from New York's 42nd congressional district 1945–1949	Succeeded by William L. Pfeiffer
