= Robert H. Gittins =

American politician (1869–1957)

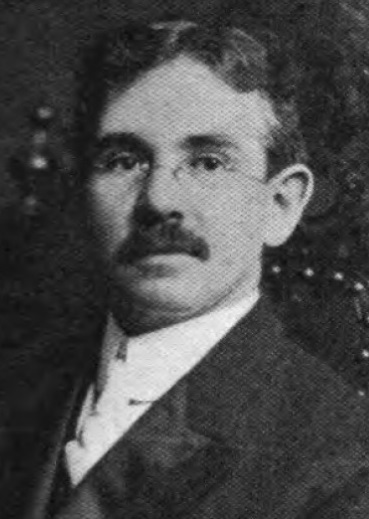

Member of the U.S. House of Representatives from New York's 40th district
- In office March 4, 1913 – March 3, 1915
- Preceded by: District created
- Succeeded by: S. Wallace Dempsey

Member of the New York Senate from the 47th district
- In office 1911–1912
- Preceded by: James P. Mackenzie
- Succeeded by: George F. Thompson

Personal details
- Born: Robert Henry Gittins; December 14, 1869 Oswego, New York, U.S.
- Died: December 25, 1957 (aged 88) Tuxedo, New York, U.S.
- Party: Democratic
- Education: University of Michigan Law School

Robert Henry Gittins (December 14, 1869 – December 25, 1957) was an American lawyer, newspaper publisher and politician from New York. He served one term in the U.S. House of Representatives from 1913 to 1915.

== Life ==
Gittins was born in Oswego, New York and attended St. Paul's Academy there. He engaged in the lumber, grain, and coal business and graduated from University of Michigan Law School in 1900.

=== Early career ===
He was admitted to the bar in Michigan and New York the same year and commenced the practice of law at Niagara Falls, New York, in 1901.

Gittins was a member of the New York State Senate (47th D.) in 1911 and 1912; and a delegate to the 1912 Democratic National Convention.

=== Congress ===
Gittins was elected as a Democrat to the 63rd United States Congress, holding office from March 4, 1913, to March 3, 1915.

=== Later career and death ===
Gittins was owner and publisher of the Niagara Falls Journal from 1914 to 1918; and was Postmaster of Niagara Falls from October 16, 1916, to January 21, 1920. Afterwards he resumed the practice of law, and was appointed commissioner of the Niagara Falls State Park in 1918, serving until 1940.

Gittins moved to New York City in 1923 and continued the practice of law until 1956. He resided in Sloatsburg, New York, until his death at Tuxedo Memorial Hospital in Tuxedo Park on December 25, 1957.

New York State Senate
Preceded by James P. Mackenzie	New York State Senate; 41st District; 1911–1912	Succeeded by George F. Thompson
U.S. House of Representatives
New district	Member of the U.S. House of Representatives from New York's 40th congressional district 1913–1915	Succeeded by S. Wallace Dempsey
