= Philip Hovis Comas =

American physician and state legislator

Philip Hovis Comas (1864-October 1934) was a physician and state legislator in Georgia. He served in the Georgia House of Representatives and Georgia Senate representing Appling County. He lived in Baxley. He married Bessie Tinley June 16, 1897.

He was born in old Holmesville. His grandfather immigrated from Barcelona, Spain.

He served as president of the Baxley Banking Company.

== See also ==
- List of former members of the Georgia State Senate
