= George F. Rogers =

American politician

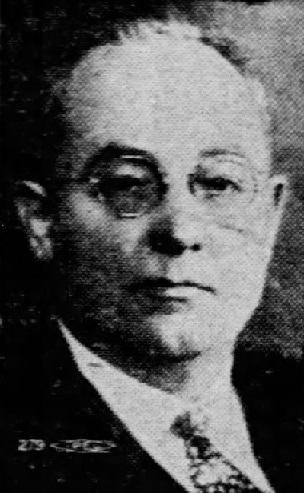

Member of the U.S. House of Representatives from New York's 40th district
- In office January 3, 1945 – January 3, 1947
- Preceded by: Walter G. Andrews
- Succeeded by: Kenneth Keating

Personal details
- Born: March 19, 1887 Harwood, Ontario, Canada
- Died: November 20, 1948 (aged 61) Cobourg, Ontario, Canada
- Party: Democratic

George Frederick Rogers (March 19, 1887 – November 20, 1948) was an American businessman and politician from New York, serving one term in the U.S. House of Representatives from 1945 to 1947.

== Life ==
Rogers was born on March 19, 1887, in Harwood, Ontario. He immigrated to the United States in 1899. He was educated in Canada and in Rochester, New York. Rogers became a merchant in Rochester. He served for three years as president of the Monroe County Retail Food Merchants' Association

=== Political career ===
He was a member of the Board of Supervisors of Monroe County from 1934 to 1935. He was a member of the New York State Senate (46th D.) in 1937 and 1938.

==== Congress ====
He was elected as a Democrat to the 79th United States Congress, holding office from January 3, 1945, to January 3, 1947. He unsuccessfully ran for re-election in 1946 against Kenneth B. Keating and was defeated again by Keating in 1948.

=== Death and burial ===
Rogers died on November 20, 1948, in Cobourg, Ontario. He was buried at Riverside Cemetery in Rochester.

== Sources ==
- United States Congress. "George F. Rogers (id: R000394)". Biographical Directory of the United States Congress.

New York State Senate
| Preceded by Norman A. O'Brien | New York State Senate; 46th District; 1937–1938 | Succeeded by Karl K. Bechtold |
U.S. House of Representatives
| Preceded by Walter G. Andrews | Member of the U.S. House of Representatives from New York's 40th congressional district 1945–1947 | Succeeded by Kenneth B. Keating |
