= 1964 Republican National Convention =

Political convention of the Republican Party

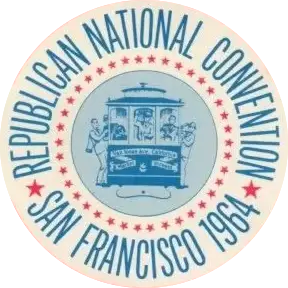
- 1964 presidential election

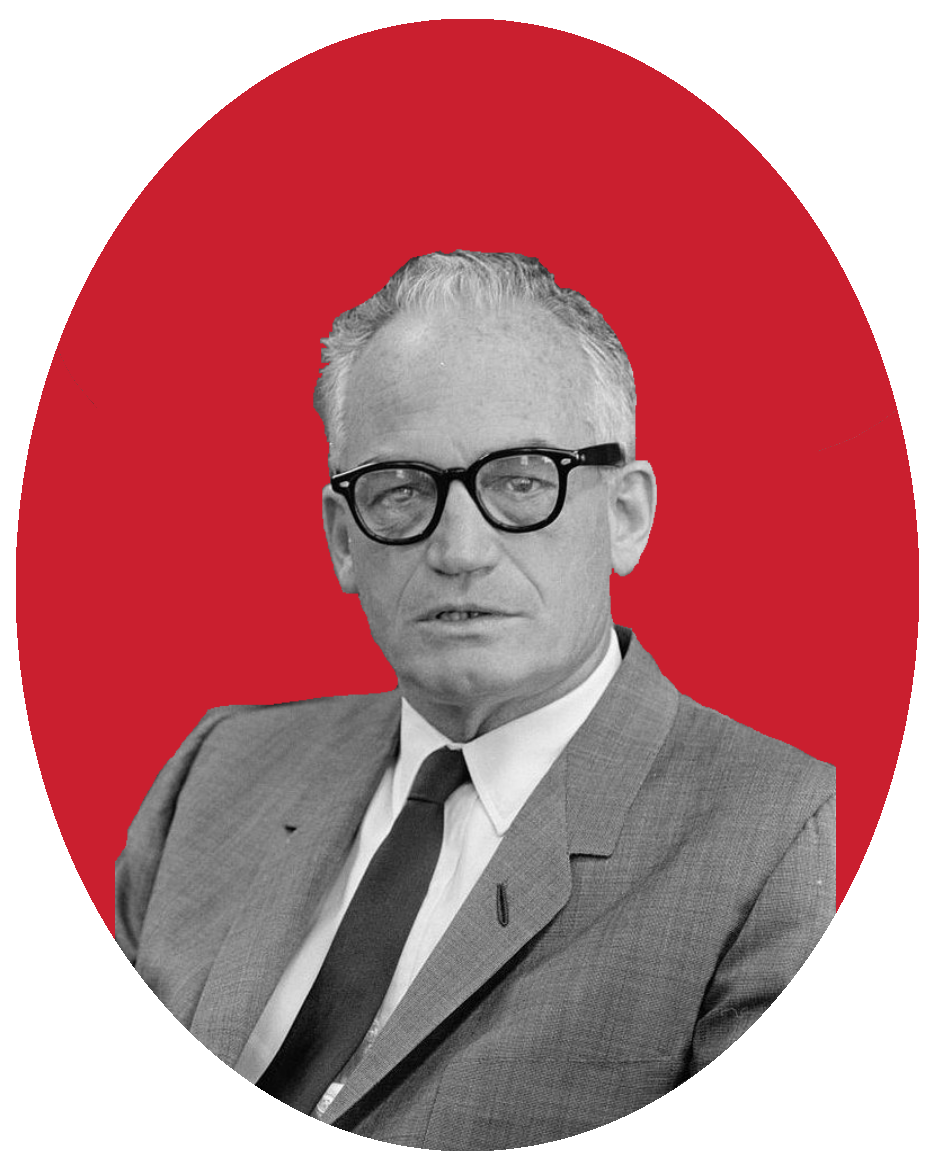
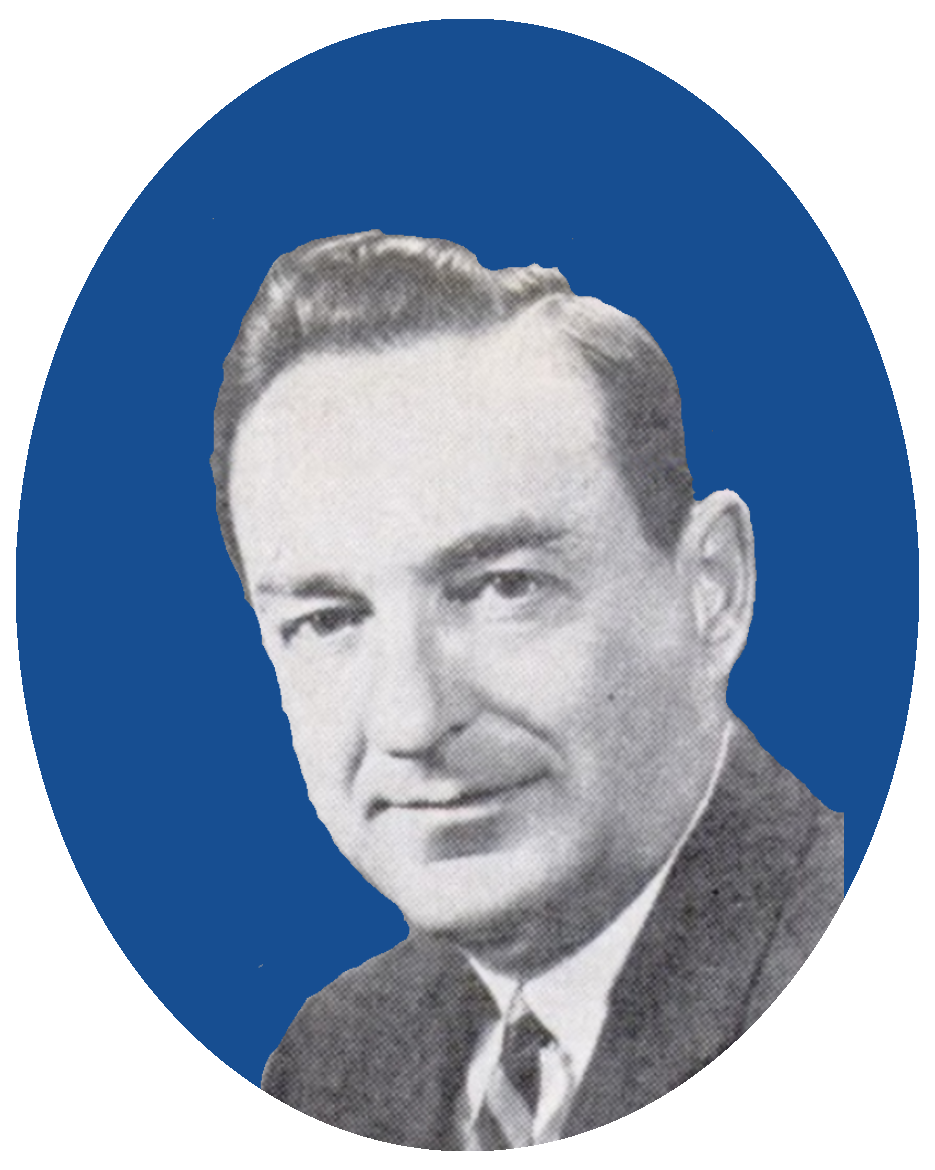
- Nominees; Goldwater and Miller

Convention
- Date(s): July 13–16, 1964
- City: Daly City, California
- Venue: Cow Palace
- Chair: Thruston Ballard Morton
- Notable speakers: Richard M. Nixon; Nelson Rockefeller

Candidates
- Presidential nominee: Barry Goldwater of Arizona
- Vice-presidential nominee: William E. Miller of New York
- Other candidates: Nelson Rockefeller; William Scranton

Voting
- Total delegates: 1,308
- Votes needed for nomination: 655
- Results (president): Goldwater (AZ): 883 (67.50%); Scranton (PA): 214 (16.36%); Rockefeller (NY): 114 (8.72%)
- Results (vice president): Miller (NY): 100% (Roll call)
- Ballots: 1

The 1964 Republican National Convention took place in the Cow Palace, Daly City, California, from July 13 to July 16, 1964. Before 1964, there had been only one national Republican convention on the West Coast, the 1956 Republican National Convention, which also took place in the Cow Palace. Many believed that a convention in San Francisco indicated the rising power of the Republican Party in the west.

== Political context ==
The Republican primaries of 1964 featured liberal Nelson Rockefeller of New York and conservative Barry Goldwater of Arizona as the two leading candidates. Shortly before the California primary, Rockefeller's wife, whom he had married the previous year after divorcing his first wife, gave birth. This event drew renewed attention to Rockefeller's family life, which hurt his popularity among conservatives. Rockefeller's divorce and remarriage were viewed by many observers as helping Goldwater win the primary. An anti-Goldwater organization called for the nomination of Governor William Scranton of Pennsylvania, but the effort failed. Although former President Dwight Eisenhower only reluctantly supported Goldwater after he won the nomination, former President Herbert Hoover gave him enthusiastic endorsement. By the end of the primaries, Goldwater's nomination was secure.

Senator Margaret Chase Smith's name was entered for nomination at the convention, the first time a woman's name was entered for nomination at a major party convention.

== The convention ==
The Republican National Convention of 1964 was a tension-filled contest. Goldwater's conservatives were openly clashing with Rockefeller's moderates. Goldwater was regarded as the "conservatives' leading spokesman." As a result, Goldwater was not as popular with the moderates and liberals of the Republican Party. When Rockefeller attempted to deliver a speech, he was booed by the convention's conservative delegates, who regarded him as a member of the "eastern liberal establishment."

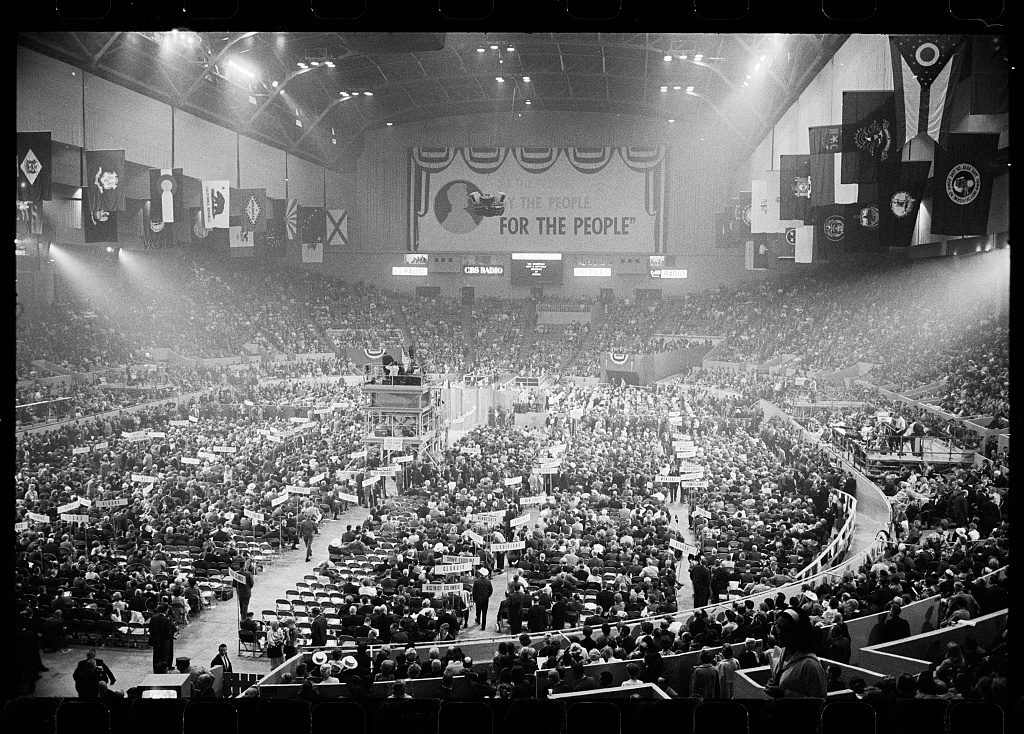
Governor Mark Hatfield appears before the convention in the Cow Palace.

Former vice president and GOP presidential nominee (and future President) Richard Nixon introduced Goldwater as "Mr. Conservative" and "Mr. Republican" and continued that "he is the man who, after the greatest campaign in history, will be Mr. President — Barry Goldwater". 1964 was the only Republican convention between 1952 and 1972 that did not result in Nixon being nominated for president or vice-president.

The newly opened San Francisco Hilton served as the headquarters of the convention.

== Civil Rights Movement ==
The 1964 Republican National Convention exposed the party's deep resentment towards the civil right's movement and the widening divide over civil rights within the GOP. As the fight for racial equality reached its most critical moment, leading Republicans who defended civil rights were shouted down, mocked, and marginalized. New York Governor, Nelson Rockefeller, a long-time advocate for social justice, warned of "the extremist threat" growing within his own party and fought to keep the GOP "the party of all people." The rejection of Rockefeller's message symbolized the Republican Party's turn away from its historic association with racial equality and toward a brand of conservatism that many African Americans viewed as openly hostile.

Jackie Robinson, attending as a delegate for Rockefeller, personally witnessed this hostility. According to the Jackie Robinson Museum, the experience transformed his political outlook; he later said he felt "like a black man in the wrong place." For Robinson and countless other Black Americans, the convention confirmed that the GOP had abandoned its role as the party of Lincoln. As civil rights leaders celebrated the passage of the Civil Rights Act, the events at the Cow Palace made clear that the Republican Party was moving in a direction that would alienate Black voters for generations.

That same summer, the Civil Rights Act of 1964 had been signed into law, outlawing segregation in public facilities and prohibiting discrimination in employment and education. Instead of uniting behind this achievement, the Republican Party split sharply. Barry Goldwater, the party's presidential nominee, voted against this act, claiming it would lead to the "destruction of free society." His opposition appealed to white voters resistant to racial change and marked a decisive break from the party's historic commitment to civil rights. As Time reports, Goldwater's stance offered a clear signal that "liberty and justice were reserved for White Americans like them."

== Platform ==
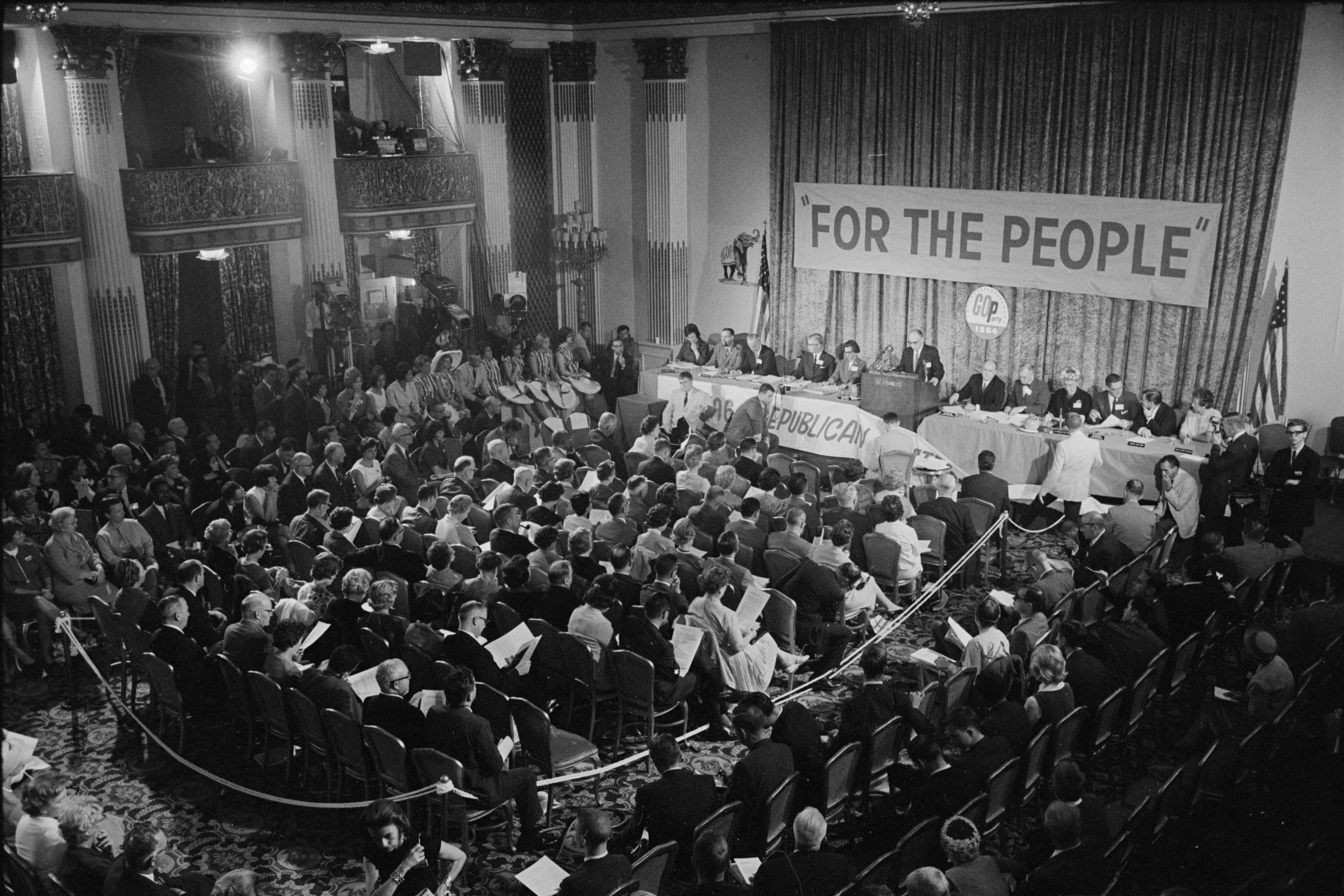
A Platform Committee meeting held ahead of the convention in on July 9

The 1964 Republican Platform was dominated by Goldwater conservatives, which meant the platform was dominated by calls for limited government, condemnations of the Kennedy and Johnson foreign and domestic policy, calls for more open space for free enterprise, a hard-line against Communist North Vietnam, calls for reform of the United Nations, a staunch support of NATO, calls for lower taxes, a hard line against international Communism, and an accusation that the Kennedy Administration was guilty of Munich-like appeasement for having opened a hotline with the Soviet Union and not with American allies.

== Presidential nomination ==
=== Presidential candidates ===
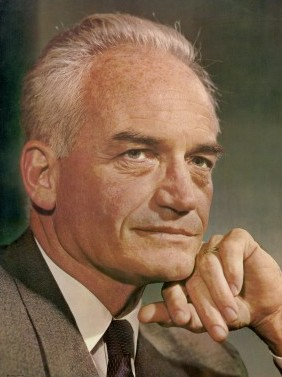
Senator
Barry Goldwater
of Arizona

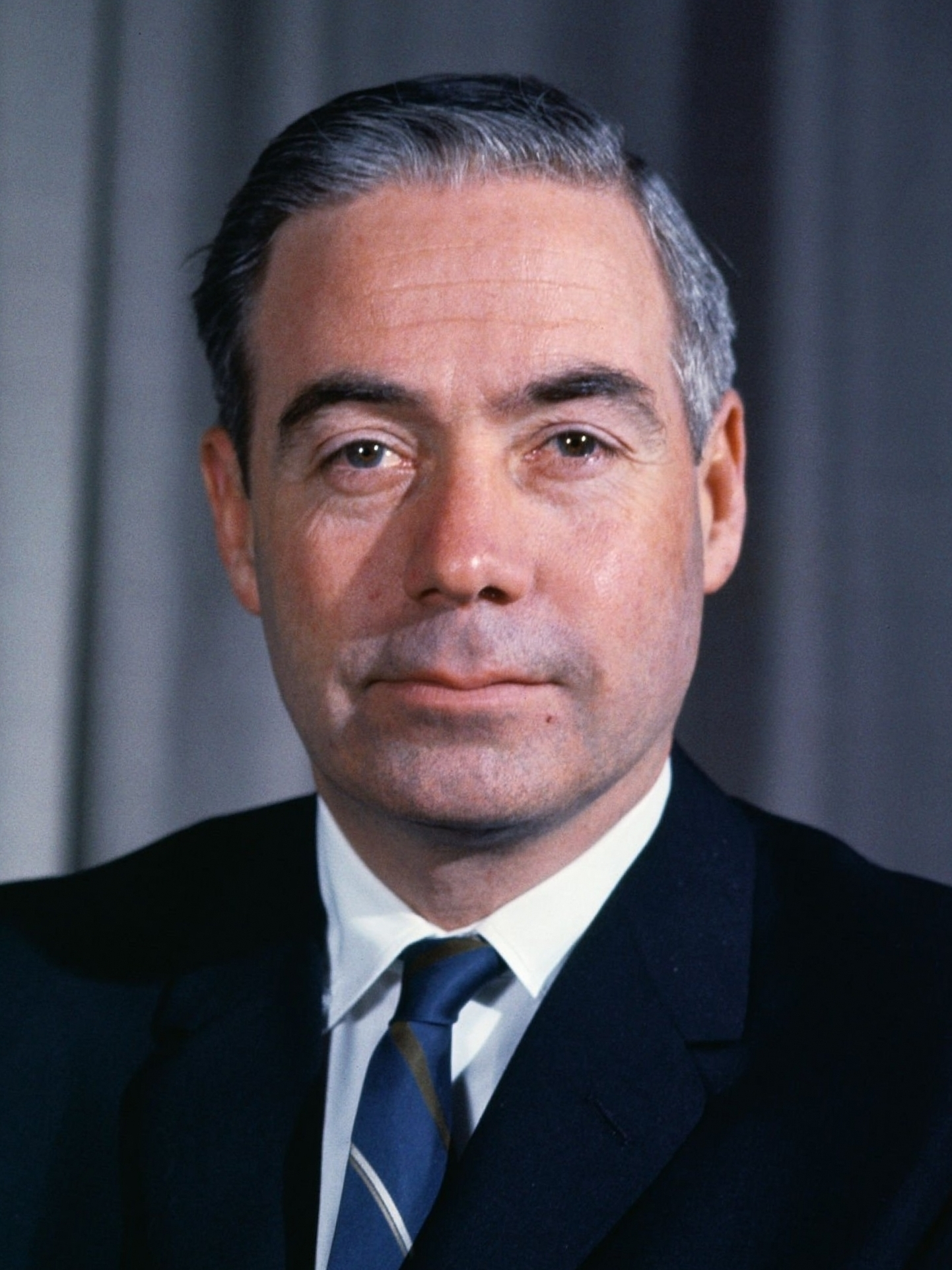
Governor
William Scranton
of Pennsylvania

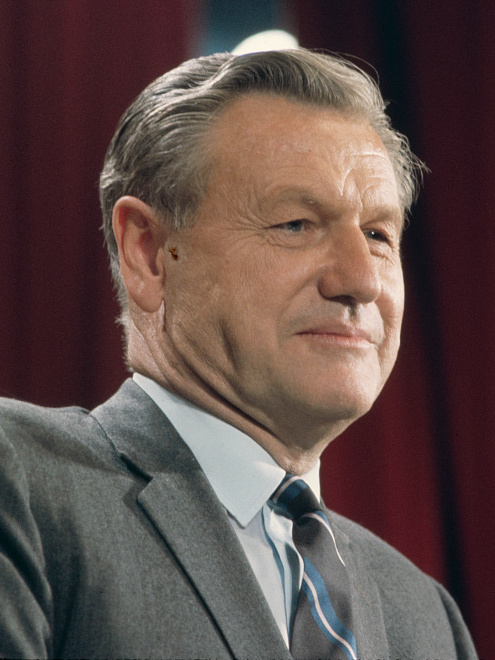
Governor
Nelson Rockefeller
of New York

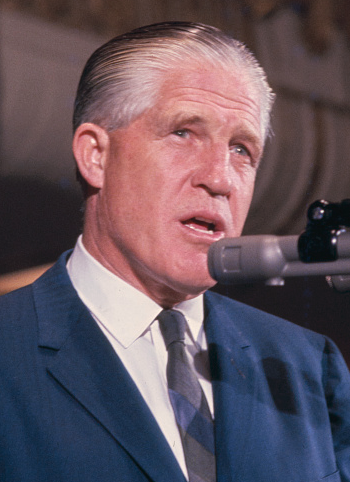
Governor
George W. Romney
of Michigan

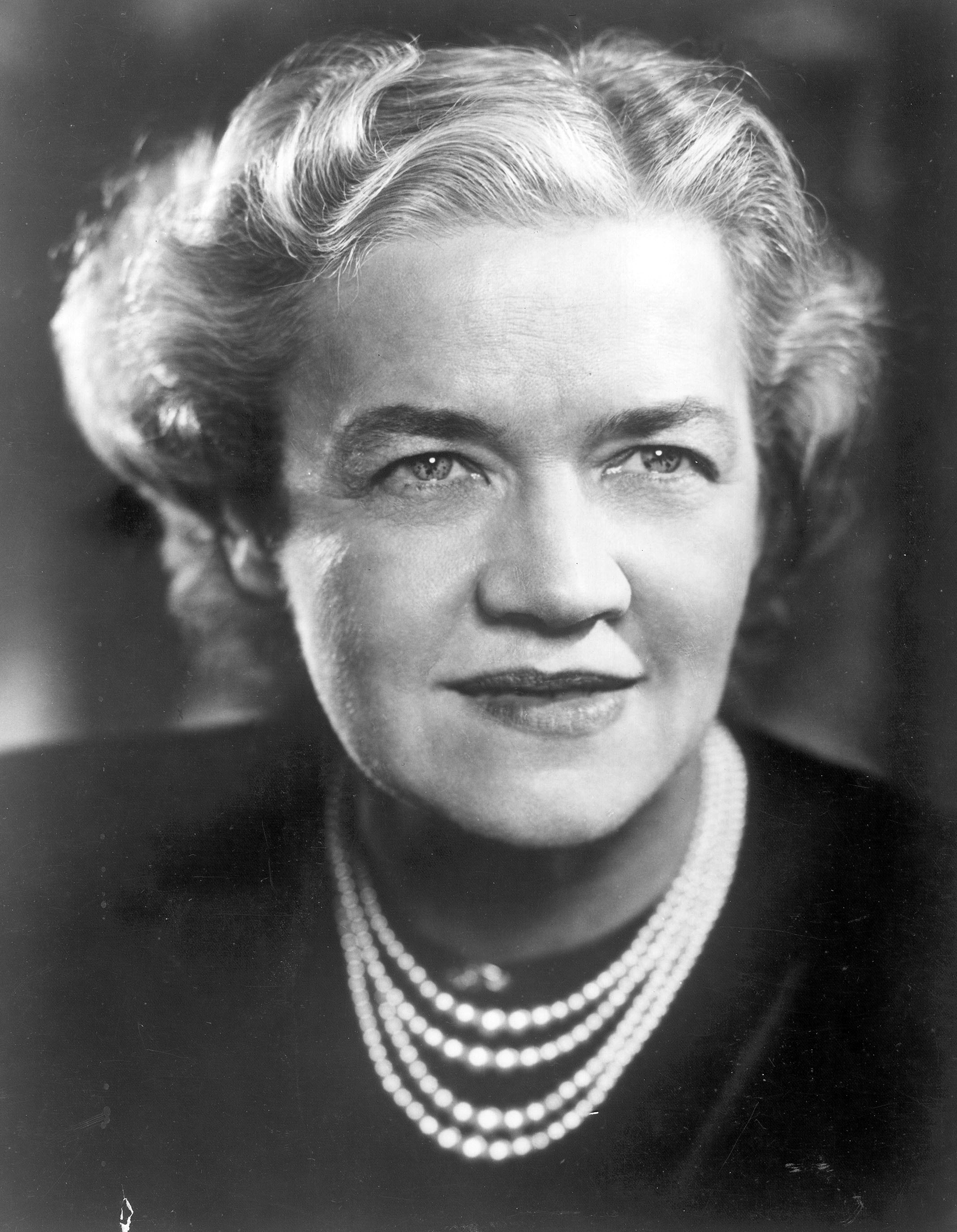
Senator
Margaret Chase Smith
of Maine

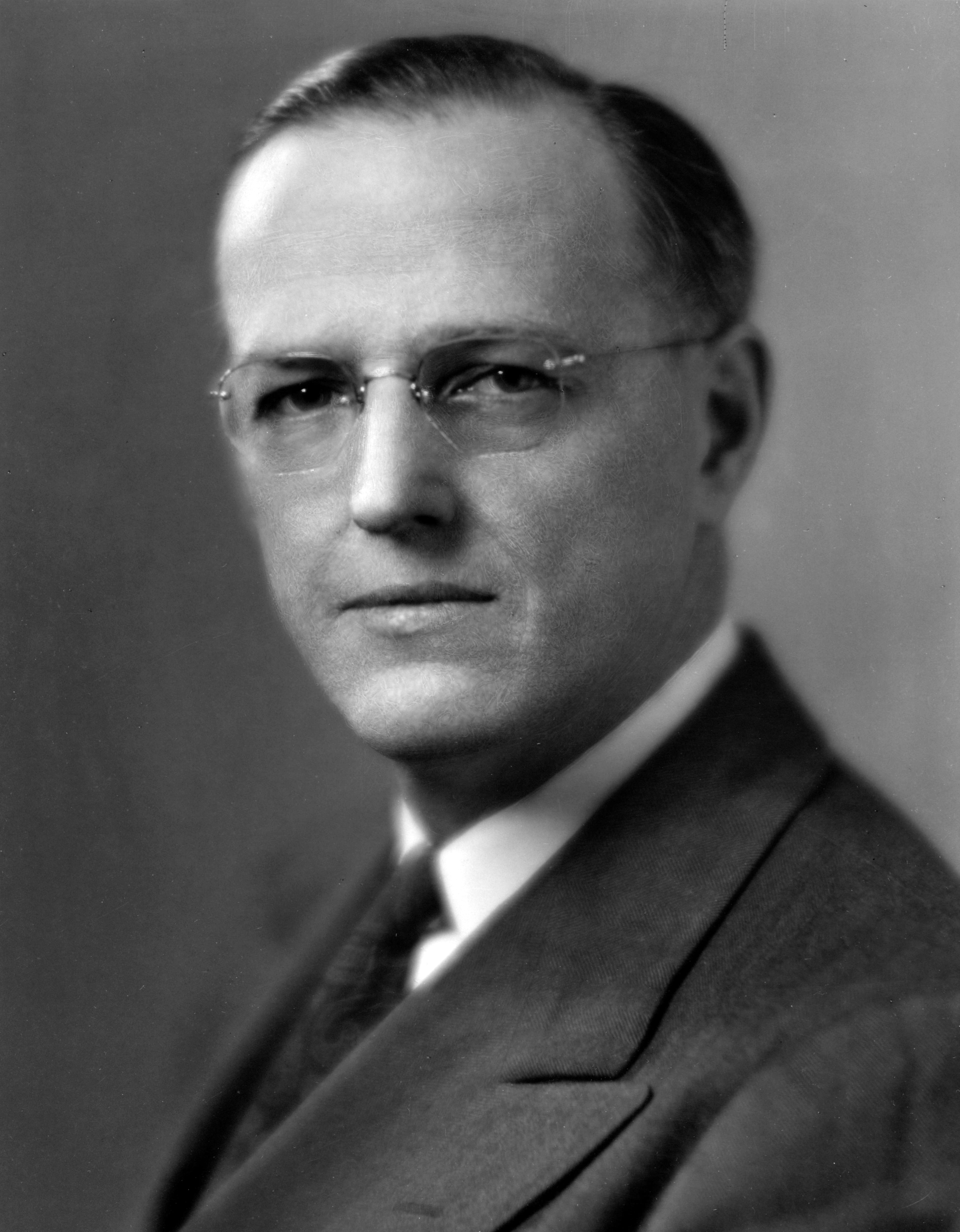
Former Representative
Walter Judd
of Minnesota

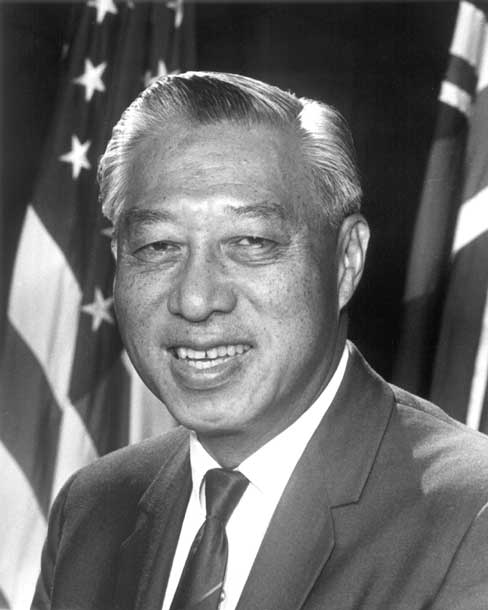
Senator
Hiram Fong
of Hawaii

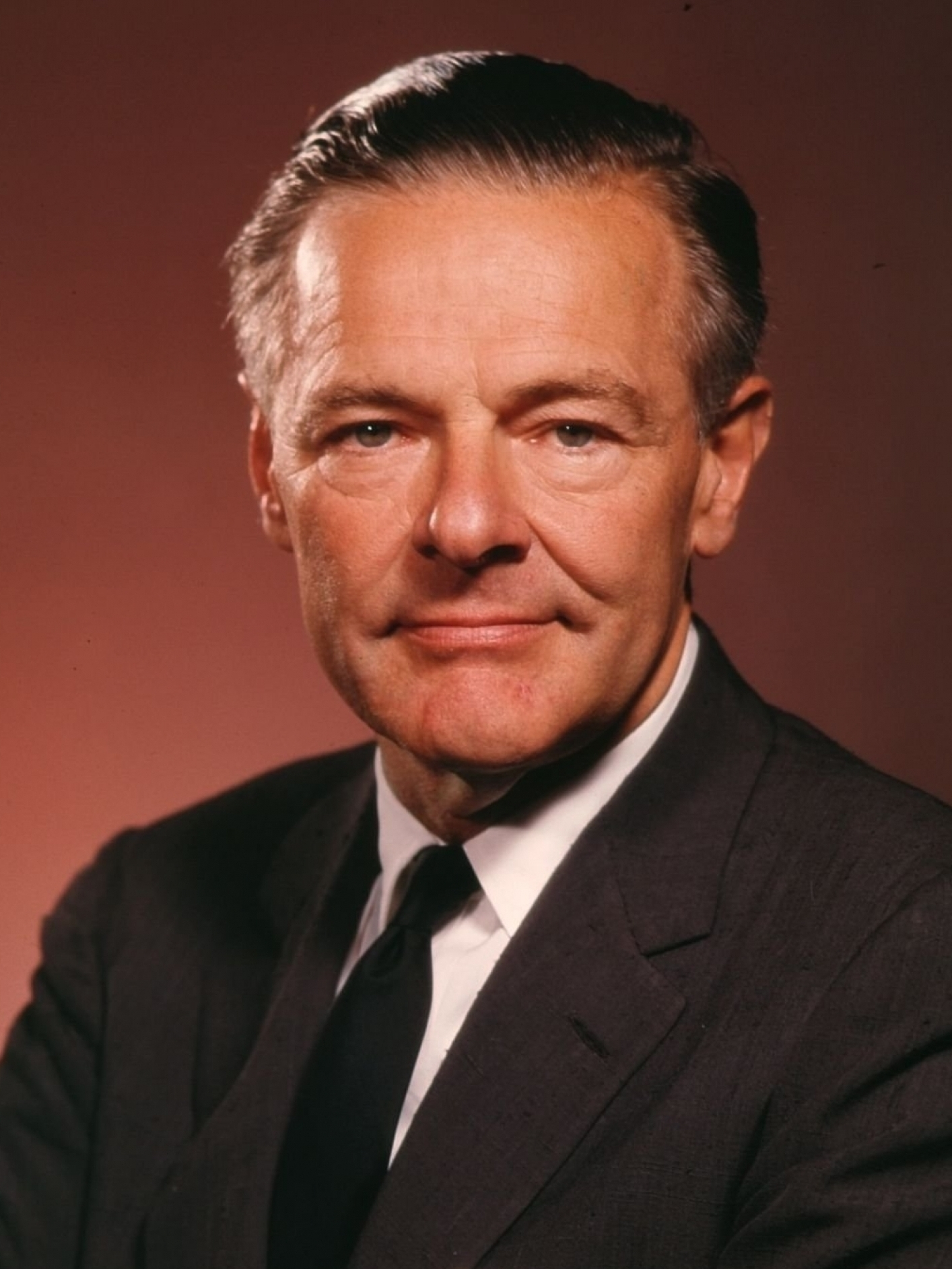
Former Ambassador
Henry Cabot Lodge Jr.
of Massachusetts

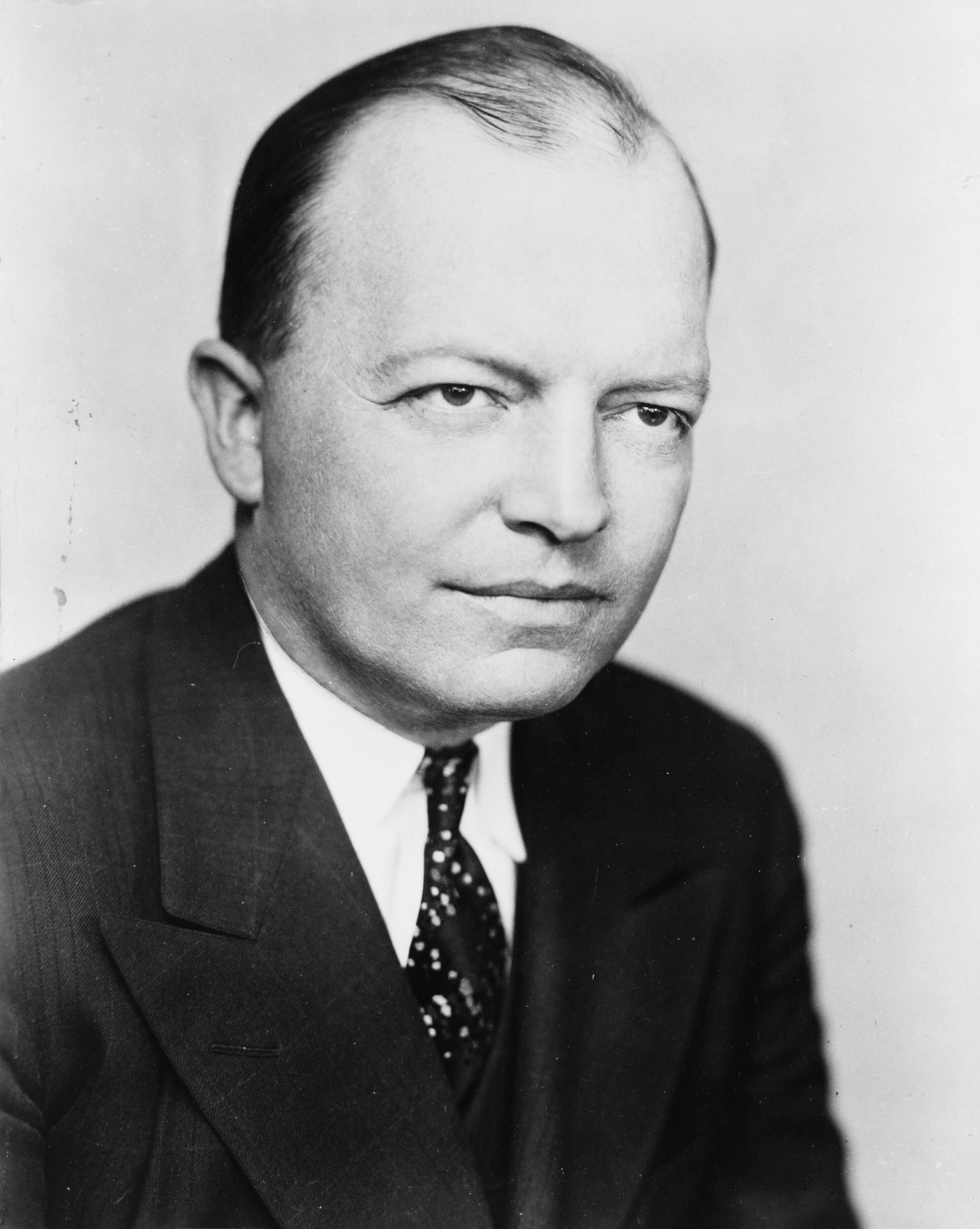
Former Governor
Harold Stassen
of Minnesota

Despite political infighting, Goldwater was easily nominated on a revised first ballot. In his acceptance speech, Goldwater declared communism as a "principal disturber of the peace in the world today" and said, "I would remind you that extremism in the defense of liberty is no vice. And let me remind you also that moderation in the pursuit of justice is no virtue." Some people, including those within his own campaign staff, believed this weakened Goldwater's chances, as he effectively severed ties with the moderates and liberals of the Republican Party.

As delegates celebrated Goldwater's nomination, Republican officials attempted to clear reporters from the convention floor. NBC reporter John Chancellor refused to leave and was escorted from the convention by police officers, leading to his famous signoff, "This is John Chancellor, somewhere in custody!" According to Emmy award-winning television journalist, Belva Davis, she and another black reporter were chased out of the convention by attendees yelling racial slurs.

| States (1st ballot - before shifts) | Goldwater | Scranton | Rockefeller | Romney | Smith | Judd | Fong | Lodge |
| Alabama | 20 | | | | | | | |
| Alaska | | 8 | | | 2 | 1 | 1 | |
| Arizona | 16 | | | | | | | |
| Arkansas | 9 | 2 | 1 | | | | | |
| California | 86 | | | | | | | |
| Colorado | 15 | 3 | | | | | | |
| Connecticut | 4 | 12 | | | | | | |
| Delaware | 7 | 5 | | | | | | |
| Florida | 32 | 2 | | | | | | |
| Georgia | 22 | 2 | | | | | | |
| Hawaii | 4 | | | | | | 4 | |
| Idaho | 14 | | | | | | | |
| Illinois | 56 | | 2 | | | | | |
| Indiana | 21 | | | | | | | |
| Iowa | 14 | 10 | | | | | | |
| Kansas | 18 | 1 | | 1 | | | | |
| Kentucky | 21 | 3 | | | | | | |
| Louisiana | 20 | | | | | | | |
| Maine | | | | | 14 | | | |
| Maryland | 6 | 13 | 1 | | | | | |
| Massachusetts | 5 | 26 | | | 1 | | | 2 |
| Michigan | 8 | | | 40 | | | | |
| Minnesota | 8 | | | | | 18 | | |
| Mississippi | 13 | | | | | | | |
| Missouri | 23 | 1 | | | | | | |
| Montana | 14 | | | | | | | |
| Nebraska | 16 | | | | | | | |
| Nevada | 6 | | | | | | | |
| New Hampshire | | 14 | | | | | | |
| New Jersey | 20 | 20 | | | | | | |
| New Mexico | 14 | | | | | | | |
| New York | 5 | | 87 | | | | | |
| North Carolina | 26 | | | | | | | |
| North Dakota | 7 | | 1 | | 3 | 3 | | |
| Ohio | 57 | | | | 1 | | | |
| Oklahoma | 22 | | | | | | | |
| Oregon | | | 18 | | | | | |
| Pennsylvania | 4 | 60 | | | | | | |
| Rhode Island | 3 | 11 | | | | | | |
| South Carolina | 16 | | | | | | | |
| South Dakota | 12 | 2 | | | | | | |
| Tennessee | 28 | | | | | | | |
| Texas | 56 | | | | | | | |
| Utah | 14 | | | | | | | |
| Vermont | 3 | 2 | 2 | | 5 | | | |
| Virginia | 29 | 1 | | | | | | |
| Washington | 22 | 1 | | | 1 | | | |
| West Virginia | 10 | 2 | 2 | | | | | |
| Wisconsin | 30 | | | | | | | |
| Wyoming | 12 | | | | | | | |
| District of Columbia | 4 | 5 | | | | | | |
| Puerto Rico | | 5 | | | | | | |
| U.S. Virgin Islands | | 3 | | | | | | |
| Total | 883 | 214 | 114 | 41 | 27 | 22 | 5 | 2 |

Presidential balloting
| Candidate | 1st (before shifts) | 1st (after shifts) |
|---|---|---|
| Goldwater | 883 | 1,220 |
| Scranton | 214 | 50 |
| Rockefeller | 114 | 6 |
| Romney | 41 | 1 |
| Smith | 27 | 22 |
| Judd | 22 | 1 |
| Fong | 5 | 1 |
| Lodge | 2 | 0 |
| Not voting | 0 | 7 |

Presidential balloting / 3rd day of convention (July 15, 1964)

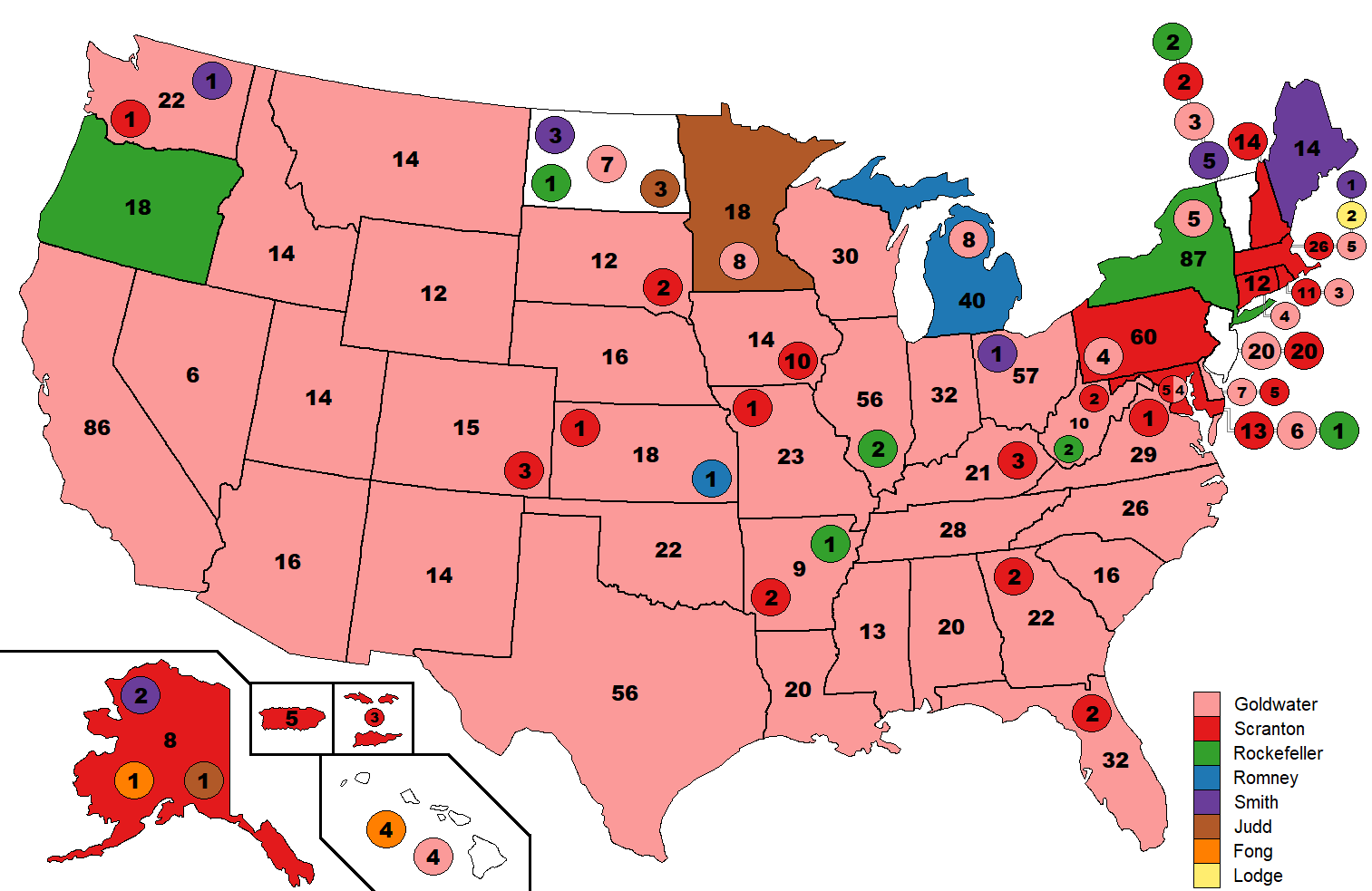
1st presidential ballot
(before shifts)

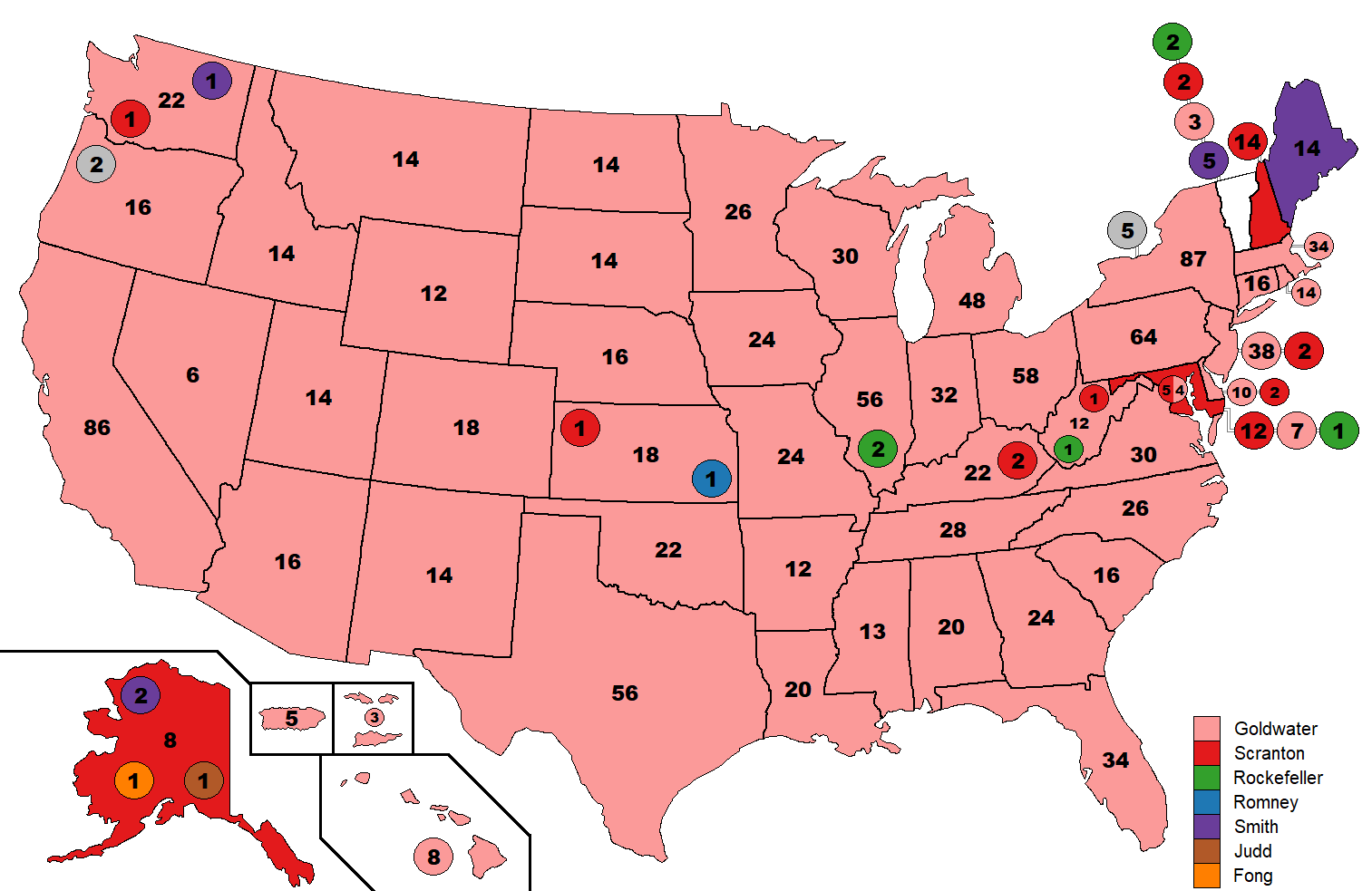
1st presidential ballot
(after shifts)

== Vice presidential nomination ==
=== Vice presidential candidates ===
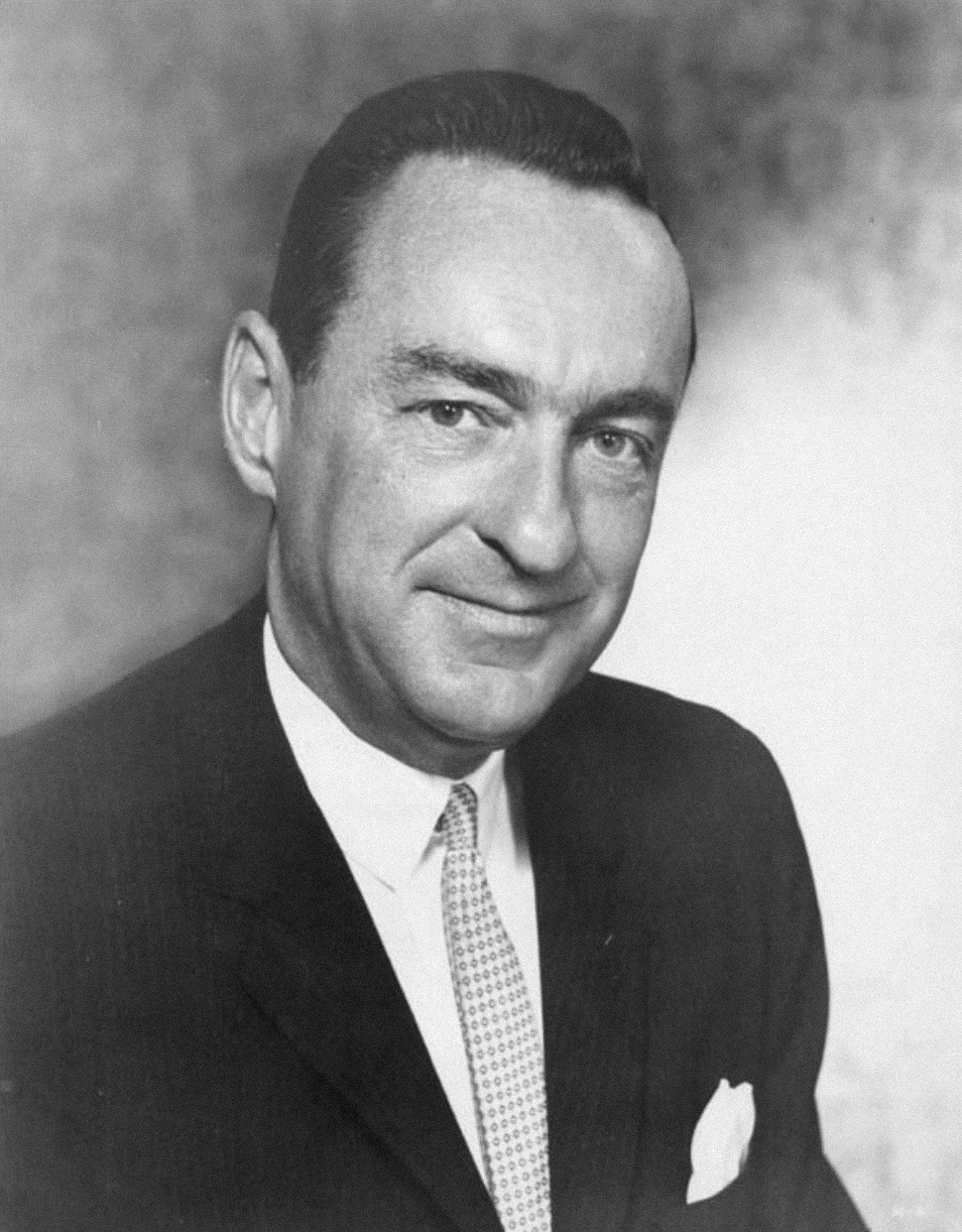
Representative
William E. Miller
of New York

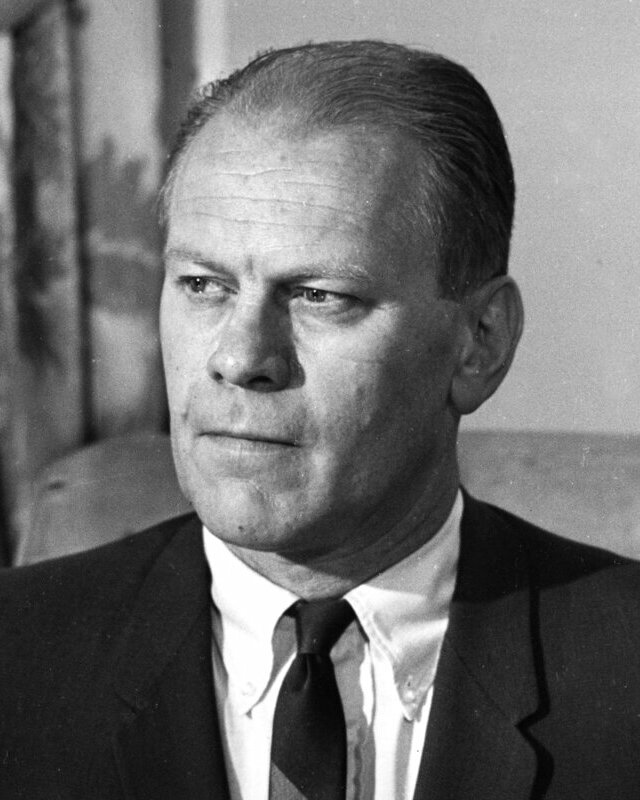
Representative
Gerald Ford
of Michigan

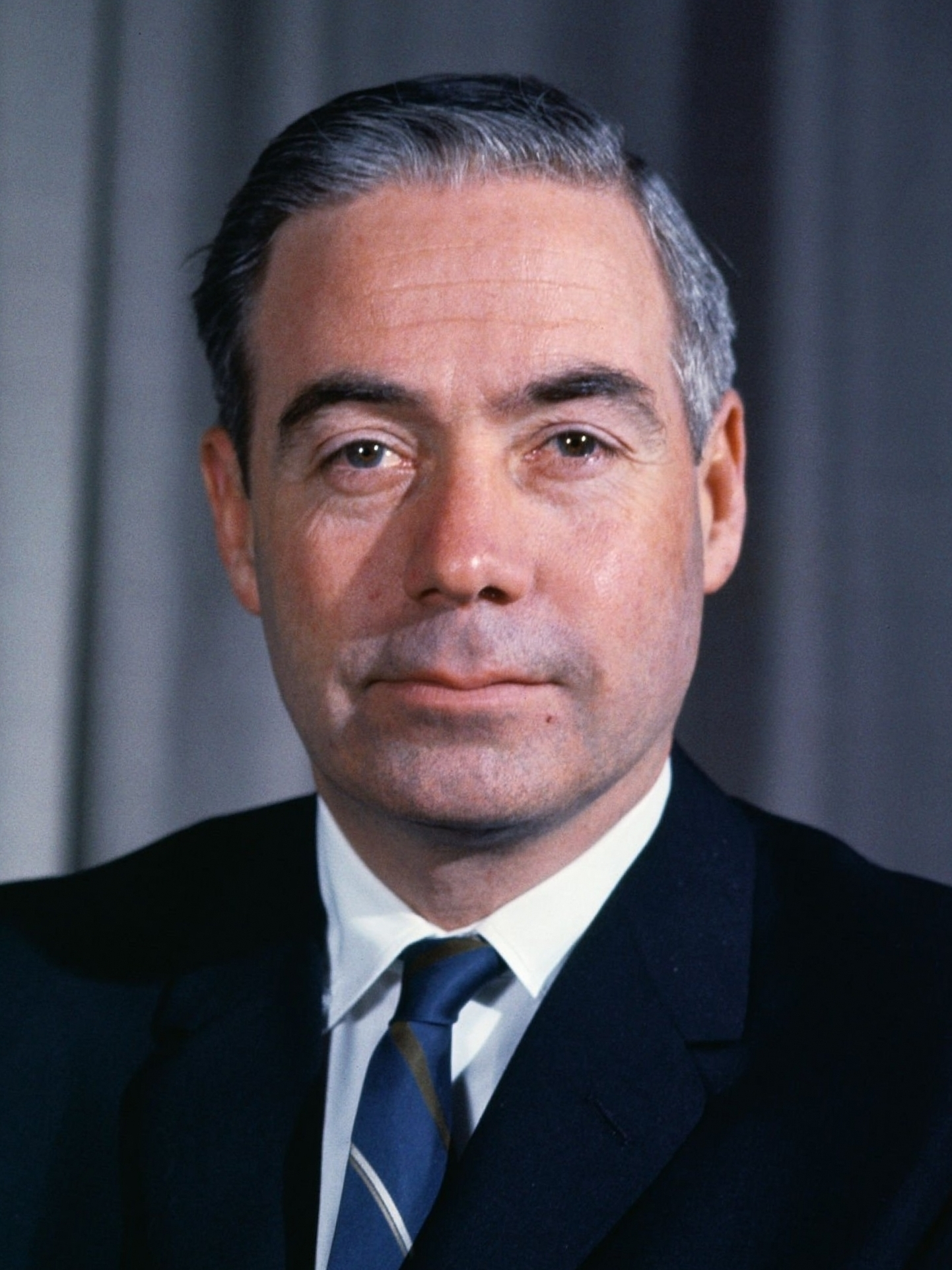
Governor
William Scranton
of Pennsylvania

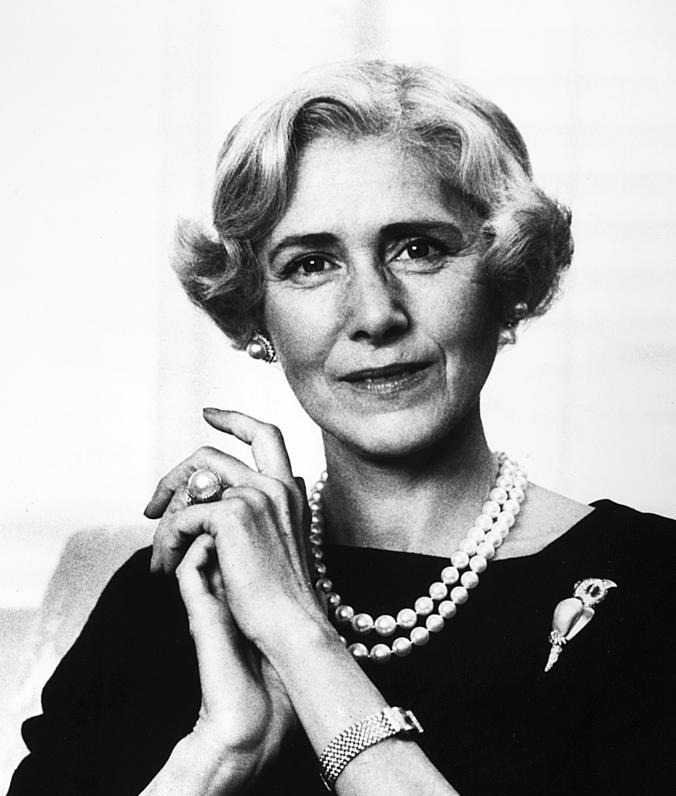
Former Representative
Clare Boothe Luce
of Connecticut

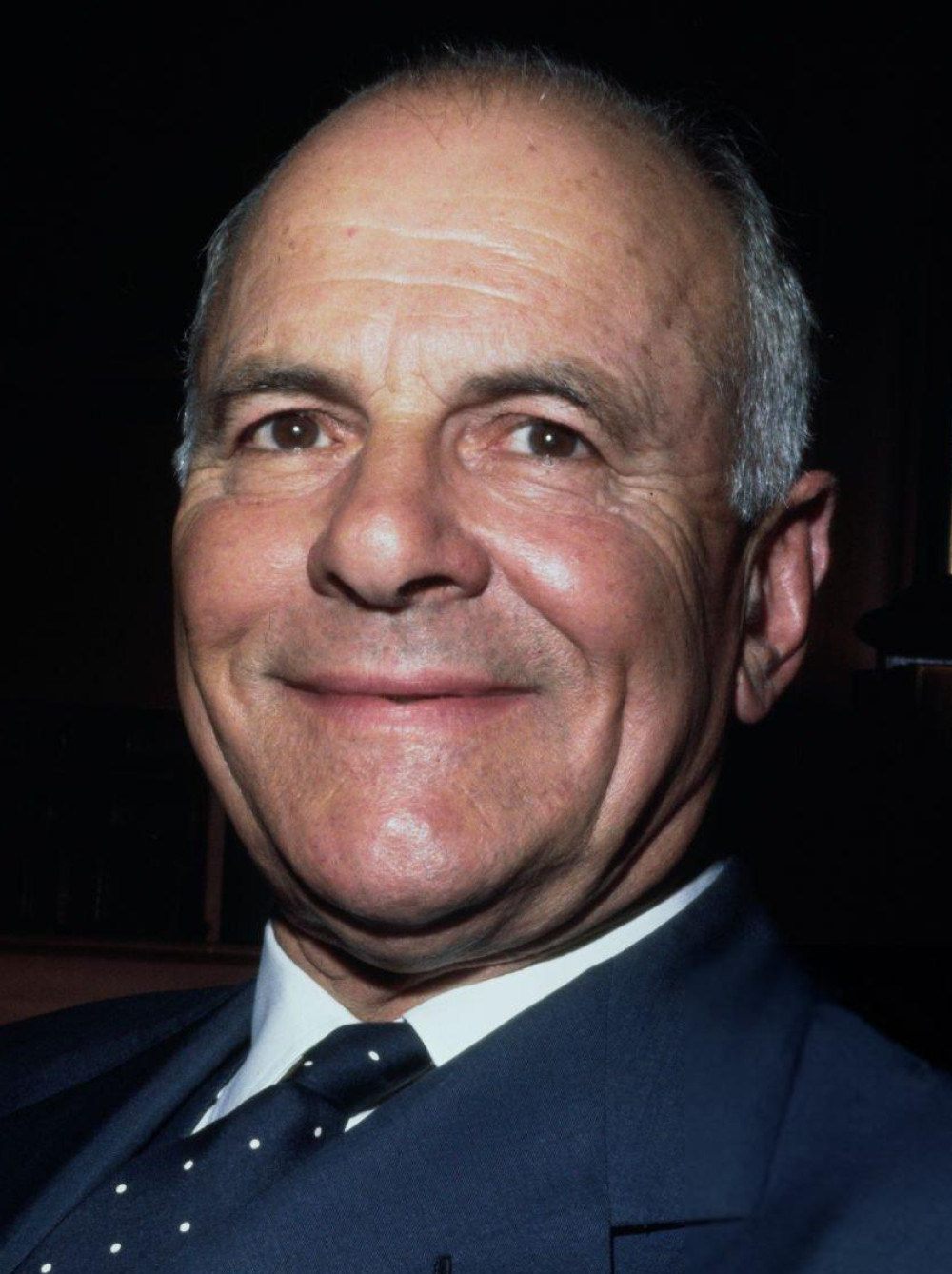
Former Governor
John Davis Lodge
of Connecticut

William E. Miller, a representative from Western New York who had served as chairman of the Republican National Committee since 1961, was nominated unanimously on a roll call vote. Goldwater stated that he chose Miller to be his running mate simply because "he drives Johnson nuts" with his Republican activism. However, by some other accounts, Johnson "was barely aware of Miller's existence." Miller's Eastern roots and Catholic faith balanced the ticket in some ways, however ideologically he was conservative like Goldwater. His relative obscurity—"he was better known for snipes at President Kennedy than for anything else"—gave birth to the refrain "Here's a riddle, it's a killer / Who the hell is William Miller?"

He was replaced as Chairman of the RNC by Dean Burch, a Goldwater loyalist from Arizona.

Vice presidential balloting
| Candidate | 1st |
|---|---|
| Miller | 1,305 |
| Abstained | 3 |

Vice presidential balloting / 4th day of convention (July 16, 1964)

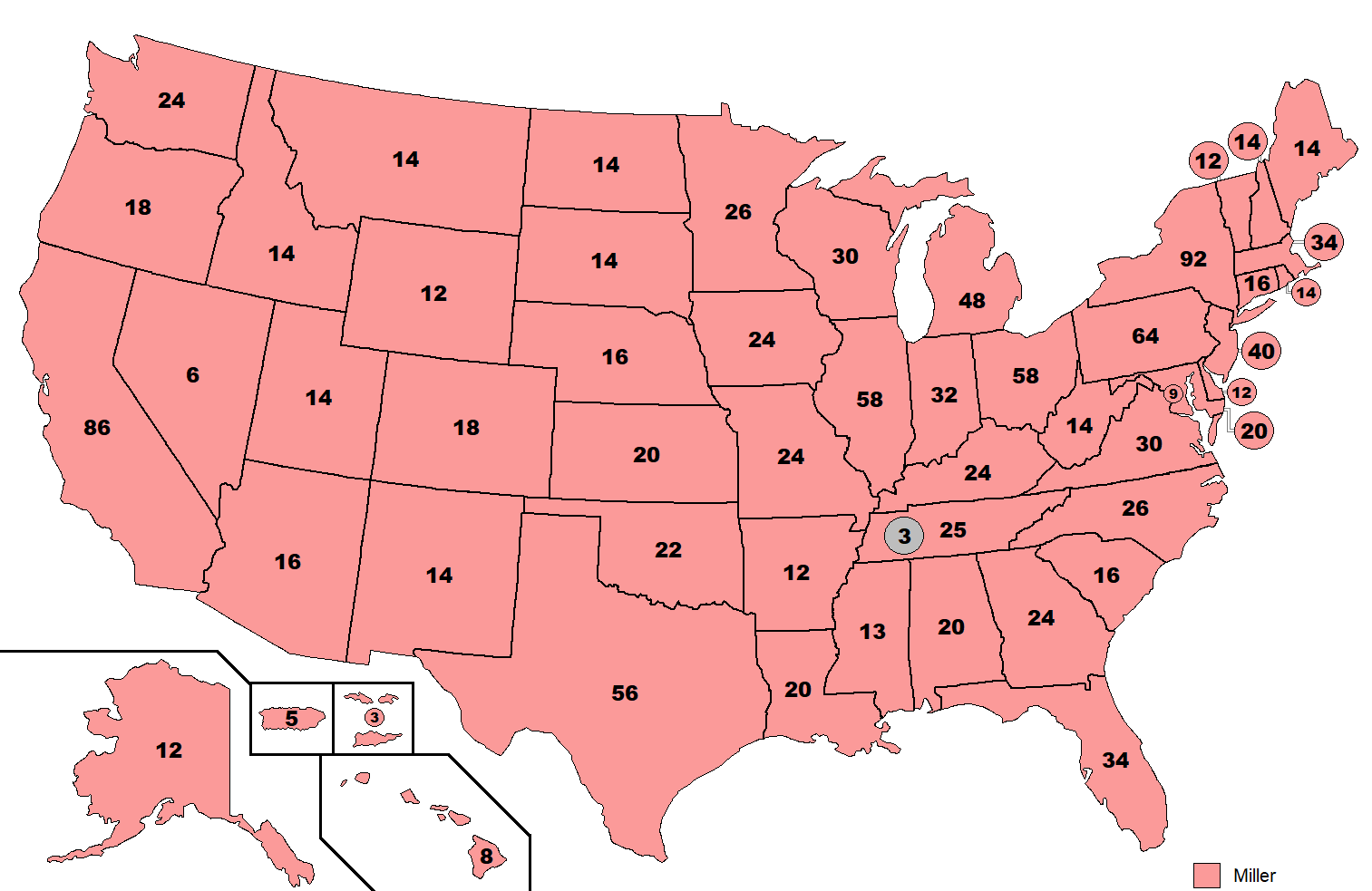
1st
vice presidential ballot

== See also ==
- History of the United States Republican Party
- List of Republican National Conventions
- United States presidential nominating convention
- 1964 Democratic National Convention
- 1964 United States presidential election
- Barry Goldwater 1964 presidential campaign

| Preceded by 1960; Chicago, Illinois | Republican National Conventions | Succeeded by 1968; Miami Beach, Florida |
