= William E. Miller =

American politician (1914–1983)

William Miller
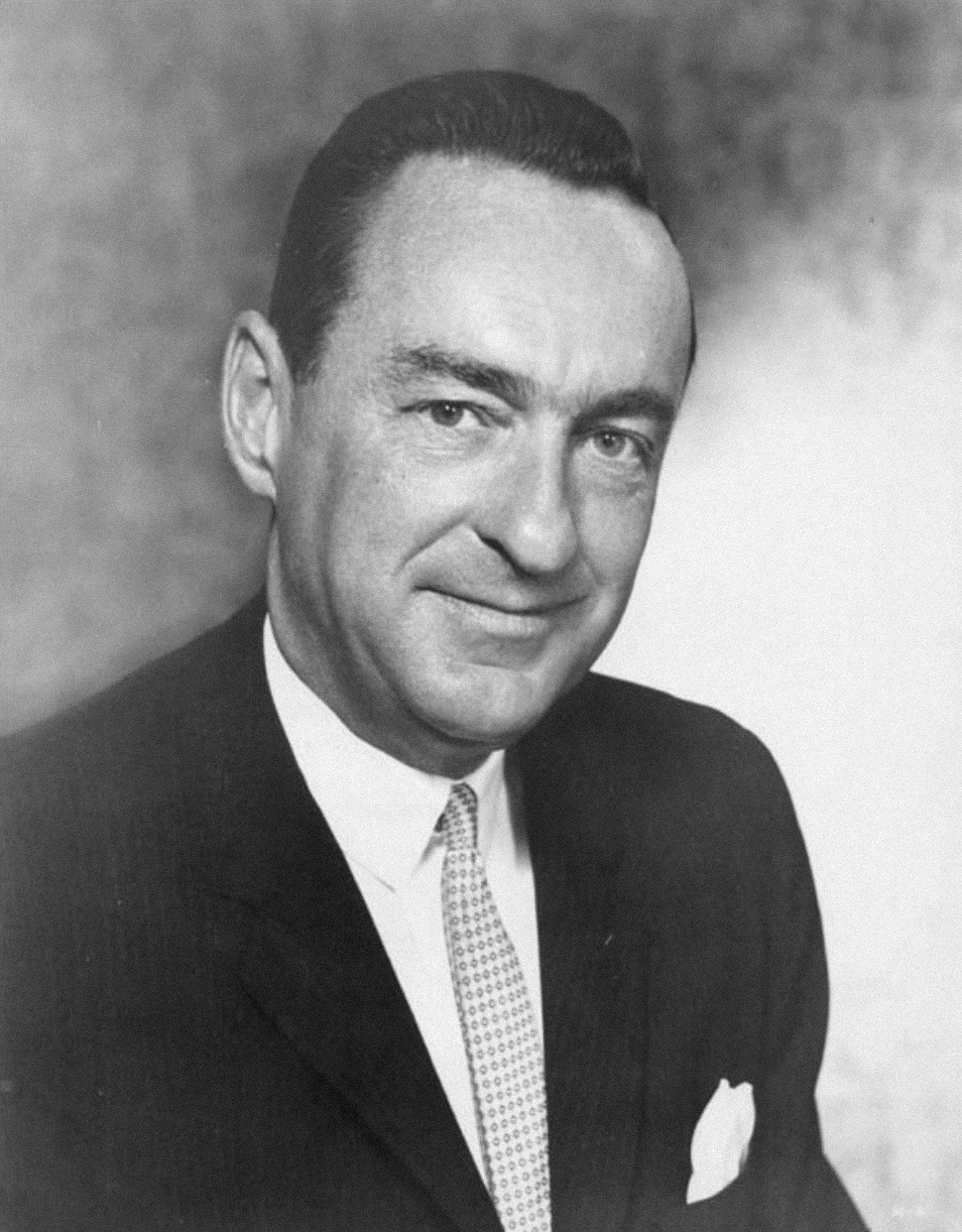
- Miller, c. 1964

44th Chair of the Republican National Committee
- In office June 2, 1961 – June 15, 1964
- Preceded by: Thruston Morton
- Succeeded by: Dean Burch

11th Chair of the National Republican Congressional Committee
- In office January 7, 1960 – January 3, 1961
- Leader: Charles A. Halleck
- Preceded by: Richard M. Simpson
- Succeeded by: Bob Wilson

Member of the U.S. House of Representatives from New York
- In office January 3, 1951 – January 3, 1965
- Preceded by: William L. Pfeiffer
- Succeeded by: Henry P. Smith III
- Constituency: 42nd district (1951–1953); 40th district (1953–1965)

District Attorney of Niagara County, New York
- In office 1948–1951
- Preceded by: John Marsh
- Succeeded by: Jack Gellman

Personal details
- Born: William Edward Miller; March 22, 1914 Lockport, New York, U.S.
- Died: June 24, 1983 (aged 69) Buffalo, New York, U.S.
- Resting place: Arlington National Cemetery
- Party: Republican
- Spouse: Stephanie Wagner (m. 1943)
- Children: 4, including Stephanie
- Education: University of Notre Dame (BA); Albany Law School (LLB)

Military service
- Branch: United States Army
- Service years: 1942–1946
- Rank: First Lieutenant
- Unit: Army Judge Advocate General's Corps
- Conflict: World War II

William Edward Miller (March 22, 1914 – June 24, 1983) was an American politician who served in the United States House of Representatives from New York as a Republican. During the 1964 presidential election, he was the Republican nominee for vice president, the first Catholic nominated for the office by the Republican Party.

A native of Lockport, New York, Miller graduated from the University of Notre Dame in 1935, and from Albany Law School in 1938, afterwards becoming an attorney in Lockport. In 1942, he was appointed a commissioner for the U.S. District Court in Buffalo, New York. Miller served in the United States Army during World War II – first as a member of an intelligence unit in Richmond, Virginia, and then as a prosecutor of Nazi war criminals during the Nuremberg trials.

Miller was an assistant district attorney in Niagara County, New York, from 1946 to 1948. In January 1948, the district attorney's position became vacant, and the governor of New York appointed Miller. Miller was elected to a full term later that year, and served as district attorney until January 1951, when he resigned.

In 1950, Miller was a successful Republican candidate for the United States House of Representatives. He was re-elected six times, and served from January 1951 until January 1965. In 1960, he was selected to lead the National Republican Congressional Committee, and led Republicans to gain more than 20 seats in that year's elections. In 1961, he became chairman of the Republican National Committee, a position he used to advocate for the party to become more conservative. In 1964, Miller was selected as the Republican nominee for vice president. The ticket of Senator Barry Goldwater and Miller for vice president lost to the Democratic nominees, President Lyndon Johnson and Senator Hubert Humphrey.

After leaving Congress, Miller resumed practicing law in Lockport. He died in Buffalo on June 24, 1983, and was buried at Arlington National Cemetery.

== Early life and education ==
William Edward Miller was born in Lockport, New York on March 22, 1914, a son of Elizabeth Hinch and Edward J. Miller. He attended the parochial schools of Lockport, and graduated from Lockport High School in 1931. Miller attended the University of Notre Dame, where he graduated with a B.A. in 1935, and Albany Law School, from which he graduated with an LL.B. in 1938. He was admitted to the bar in 1938, and practiced in Lockport. In 1942, Miller was appointed a commissioner for the U.S. District Court in Buffalo.

== Career ==
=== Military service ===
Miller enlisted for World War II; he joined the United States Army on July 1, 1942, and received training in the Military Intelligence branch. After serving with an Intelligence unit in Richmond, Virginia, in May 1945, Miller received his commission as a first lieutenant and was assigned to the War Criminals Branch of the War Department staff. In August 1945, he was assigned as assistant prosecutor of Nazi war criminals during the Nuremberg trials. Miller was discharged in March 1946, and returned to Lockport.

=== Politics ===
==== District attorney ====
Miller served as an assistant district attorney of Niagara County, New York from 1946 to 1948. Governor Thomas E. Dewey appointed Miller to fill a vacancy as district attorney in January 1948, and Miller won election to a full term in November. He served until resigning in January 1951 as he prepared to assume his seat in Congress.

==== Congressman ====
In August 1950, Miller won the Republican nomination in New York's 42nd Congressional district after defeating Melvin L. Payne and James W. Heary in a primary. He won the general election in November by defeating the Democratic nominee, Mary Louise Nice.

After redistricting placed Miller in New York's 40th Congressional District, he was easily reelected every two years from 1952 to 1962. He rose through seniority to become the second-ranking Republican on the Judiciary Committee, and received credit for two major pieces of legislation. The first was a compromise on the development of Niagara Falls hydroelectric power, and the second was a law authorizing construction of a new Lake Erie‐Lake Ontario canal east of the Niagara River. Miller voted in favor of the Civil Rights Acts of 1957, 1960, and 1964, as well as the 24th Amendment to the U.S. Constitution.

Miller became influential with respect to the internal workings of the House. In 1959, he took part in the Republican caucus' action to replace Minority Leader (and former Speaker) Joseph W. Martin Jr. with Charles Halleck. Republicans had lost House seats in the 1958 election, and decided to replace the moderate Martin with the more conservative Halleck. In 1960, Miller won election as head of the National Republican Congressional Committee. In the November election, the party gained 22 House seats, an achievement that was notable because it occurred as Republicans were losing the presidential election.

==== Republican National Committee ====
Miller's success with the 1960 House elections led to his selection as head of the Republican National Committee. He served from 1961 to 1964, and advocated for the party to become more conservative, including tacitly supporting Goldwater for the 1964 presidential nomination.

As chairman, Miller oversaw the party's efforts during the 1962 Congressional elections. Though Republicans lost five seats in the Senate, they gained four in the House. In addition, Democratic candidates in several races throughout the South experienced tougher than expected races, indicating that the domination the Democrats had enjoyed regionally since the Civil War was in peril. These included the moderate-to-liberal Senator J. Lister Hill of Alabama, who defeated business Republican businessman James D. Martin by just 50.9 percent to 49.1. Martin's strong showing demonstrated his viability as a candidate, and in 1964 he was elected to the U.S. House.

In the early 1960s, leading Republicans including Miller and Senator Barry Goldwater began advocating for a plan they called the Southern Strategy, an effort to make Republican gains in the Solid South, which had been pro-Democratic since the American Civil War. Under the Southern Strategy, Republicans would continue an earlier effort to make inroads in the South, Operation Dixie, by ending attempts to appeal to African American voters in the Northern states, and instead appeal to white conservative voters in the South. As documented by reporters and columnists including Joseph Alsop and Arthur Krock, on the surface the Southern Strategy would appeal to white voters in the South by advocating against the New Frontier programs of President John F. Kennedy and in favor of a smaller federal government and states' rights, while less publicly arguing against the Civil Rights movement and in favor of continued racial segregation.

Miller concurred with Goldwater, and backed the Southern Strategy, including holding private meetings of the RNC and other key Republican leaders in late 1962 and early 1963 so they could decide whether to implement it. Overruling the moderate and liberal wings of the party, its leadership decided to pursue the Southern Strategy for the 1964 elections and beyond.

==== Vice presidential candidate ====
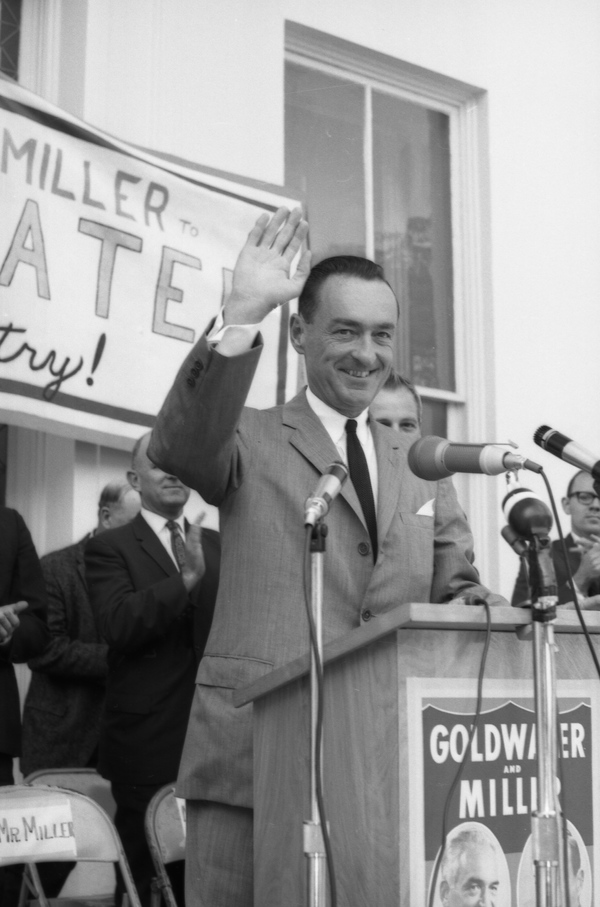
Miller speaking in Tallahassee in 1964.

After winning the Republican presidential nomination, Goldwater chose Miller to be his running mate. In Goldwater's telling, he picked Miller because "he drives Johnson nuts" with his Republican activism. But by some other accounts, Johnson "was barely aware of Miller's existence." Miller's Eastern roots and Catholic faith balanced the ticket in some ways, but ideologically he was conservative like Goldwater. His relative obscurity—"he was better known for snipes at President Kennedy than for anything else"—gave birth to the refrain "Here's a riddle, it's a killer / Who the hell is William Miller?"

In the general election, incumbent Lyndon Johnson won a landslide victory. The Goldwater/Miller ticket carried only six states − Goldwater's home state of Arizona, plus Louisiana, Alabama, Mississippi, Georgia, and South Carolina. Despite the defeat, the ticket's inroads into the previously Solid South were seen as an indication that the Southern Strategy was viable, and Republicans continued to pursue it in subsequent campaigns.

=== Later life ===
Following the defeat of the Goldwater–Miller ticket, Miller returned to his hometown of Lockport, New York, where he resumed his law practice. He also appeared in one of the first "Do you know me?" commercials for American Express. Mark Z. Barabak later wrote in the Los Angeles Times that by the time he died, Miller was "better known for his advertising appearance than his years in Congress."

He participated in an interview in 1979 in which he stated that he did not miss politics as he had "had such a saturation of it in my life".

On June 5, 1983, he was admitted to Millard Fillmore Suburban Hospital in Williamsville, New York, for diagnostic tests. He suffered a stroke in mid-June and died in Buffalo, New York, on June 24, 1983. Miller was buried at Arlington National Cemetery. In noting Miller's passing, Goldwater stated "he was one of the greatest men I have ever known and I feel his loss very deeply".

== Personal life ==
Miller and his wife, Stephanie (née Wagner; 1923–2023) were the parents of three daughters and a son. Their youngest daughter, Stephanie Miller, was a stand-up comedian in the 1980s, and CNBC late night TV host in the 1990s. Since 2004 she has hosted a nationally syndicated politically liberal radio talk show based in Los Angeles. Their son, William E. Miller Jr., was the unsuccessful 1992 and 1994 Republican nominee in New York's 29th congressional district.

== Electoral history ==
William E. Miller electoral history

1950 New York Forty Second Congressional District election
Party	Candidate	Votes	%	±%
Republican	William E. Miller	75,377	58.57%	+7.52%
Democratic	Mary Louise Nice	53,310	41.43%	−5.21%
Total votes		'128,687'	'100.00%'	

1952 New York Fortieth Congressional District election
Party	Candidate	Votes	%	±%
Republican	William E. Miller (incumbent)	102,565	59.64%	+1.07%
Democratic	E. Dent Lackey	69,087	40.17%	−1.26%
American Labor	John Touralchuk	329	0.19%	+0.19%
Total votes		'171,981'	'100.00%'	

1954 New York Fortieth Congressional District election
Party	Candidate	Votes	%	±%
Republican	William E. Miller (incumbent)	77,016	60.92%	+1.28%
Democratic	Mariano A. Lucca	46,956	37.14%	−3.03%
Liberal	Louis Longo	2,233	1.77%	+1.77%
American Labor	Nick Curtis	222	0.18%	−0.01%
Total votes		'126,427'	'100.00%'	

1956 New York Fortieth Congressional District election
Party	Candidate	Votes	%	±%
Republican	William E. Miller (incumbent)	117,051	64.34%	+3.42%
Democratic	A. Thorne Hills	64,872	35.66%	−1.48%
Total votes		'181,923'	'100.00%'	

1958 New York Fortieth Congressional District election
Party	Candidate	Votes	%	±%
Republican	William E. Miller (incumbent)	90,066	60.80%	−3.54%
Democratic	Mariano A. Lucca	54,728	36.94%	+1.28%
Liberal	Helen J. Di Pota	3,354	2.26%	+2.26%
Total votes		'148,148'	'100.00%'	

1960 New York Fortieth Congressional District election
Party	Candidate	Votes	%	±%
Republican	William E. Miller (incumbent)	104,752	53.62%	−7.18%
Democratic	Mariano A. Lucca	85,005	43.51%	+6.57%
Liberal	Albert J. Taylor	5,621	2.88%	+0.62%
Total votes		'195,378'	'100.00%'	

1962 New York Fortieth Congressional District Republican primary
Party	Candidate	Votes	%	±%
Republican	William E. Miller (incumbent)	21,579	76.49%	
Republican	Donald C. Chaplin	6,633	23.51%	
Total votes		'28,212'	'100.00%'	

1962 New York Fortieth Congressional District election
Party	Candidate	Votes	%	±%
Republican	William E. Miller (incumbent)	72,706	52.04%	−1.58%
Democratic	E. Dent Lackey	67,004	47.96%	+4.45%
Total votes		'139,710'	'100.00%'	

== See also ==
- List of members of the House Un-American Activities Committee

U.S. House of Representatives
Preceded by William L. Pfeiffer	Member of the U.S. House of Representatives from New York's 42nd congressional district 1951–1953	Succeeded by John R. Pillion
Preceded by Kenneth Keating	Member of the U.S. House of Representatives from New York's 40th congressional district 1953–1965	Succeeded by Henry P. Smith III
Party political offices
Preceded by Thruston Morton	Chair of the Republican National Committee; 1961–1964	Succeeded by Dean Burch
Preceded by Henry Cabot Lodge Jr.	Republican nominee for Vice President of the United States; 1964	Succeeded by Spiro Agnew
