= S. Wallace Dempsey =

American politician (1862–1949)

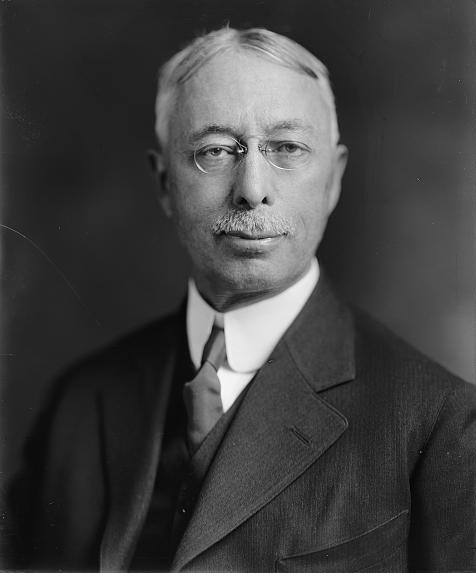
- 1915 Harris & Ewing portrait of Dempsey

Member of the U.S. House of Representatives from New York's 40th district
- In office March 4, 1915 – March 3, 1931
- Preceded by: Robert H. Gittins
- Succeeded by: Walter G. Andrews

Personal details
- Born: Stephen Wallace Dempsey; May 8, 1862 Hartland, New York, US
- Died: March 1, 1949 (aged 86) Washington, D.C., US
- Resting place: Rock Creek Cemetery
- Party: Republican
- Occupation: Politician, lawyer

Stephen Wallace Dempsey (May 8, 1862 – March 1, 1949) was an American politician and lawyer. A Republican, he was a member of the United States House of Representatives from New York. Born in Hartland, New York, he served in the House from 1915 to 1931. Politically, he was conservative.

== Biography ==
Dempsey was born on May 8, 1862, in Hartland, New York. Educated at local schools, he graduated from the Deveaux School in 1880. He studied law, and in 1886, was admitted to the bar, after which he began practicing in Lockport. He was a member of the partnership Dempsey & Fogle.

From 1889 to 1907, Dempsey was assistant to the United States Attorney for the Western District of New York, and from 1907 to 1912, was assistant to the United States Attorney General. In the latter position, he prosecuted railroad companies, as well as Standard Oil.

Dempsey was a Republican. He was a member of the United States House of Representatives, from March 4, 1915, to March 3, 1931, representing New York's 40th district. From 1921 to 1931, he was chairman of the Committee on Rivers and Harbors. On September 16, 1922, he was slapped twice in the jaw by William B. Oliver, over a dispute regarding canal development; Oliver later apologized.

Dempsey was not nominated to the following election. He was also an alternate delegate to the 1928 Republican National Convention. Politically, he was conservative, such as in his support for Prohibition.

After serving in Congress, Dempsey continued practicing law, in Washington, D.C. On June 26, 1889, he married Laura Hoag; they had a daughter together. He died at the MedStar Georgetown University Hospital there, on March 1, 1949, aged 86, and was buried at Rock Creek Cemetery, in Washington, D.C. Following his death, his wife inherited his estate.

U.S. House of Representatives
Preceded by Robert H. Gittins	Member of the U.S. House of Representatives from New York's 40th congressional district 1915–1931	Succeeded by Walter G. Andrews
