= Roscoe E. Dean =

American politician

Member of the Georgia State Senate from the 6th district
- In office 1965–1978

Personal details
- Born: September 2, 1936 Wayne County, Georgia, U.S.
- Died: November 21, 2016 (aged 80)
- Party: Democratic
- Education: University of Georgia School of Law; John Marshall University

Roscoe E. Dean (September 2, 1936 – November 21, 2016) was an American politician. He served as a Democratic Party member for the 6th district of the Georgia State Senate.

== Life and career ==
Dean was born in Wayne County, Georgia. He attended the University of Georgia School of Law and John Marshall University.

Dean served in the Georgia State Senate from 1965 to 1978, representing the 6th district.

Dean died on November 21, 2016, at the age of 80.

== See also ==
- List of former members of the Georgia State Senate
