= William L. Pfeiffer =

American politician (1907–1985)

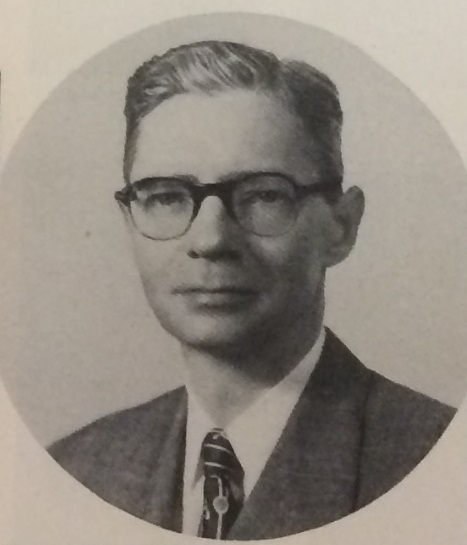

Member of the U.S. House of Representatives from New York's 42nd district
- In office January 3, 1949 – January 3, 1951
- Preceded by: Walter G. Andrews
- Succeeded by: William E. Miller

Personal details
- Born: May 29, 1907 Buffalo, New York, US
- Died: July 22, 1985 (aged 78) Glens Falls, New York, US
- Party: Republican

William Louis Pfeiffer (May 29, 1907 – July 22, 1985) was a Republican politician who served one term as a member of the United States House of Representatives from New York.

== Biography ==
Pfeiffer was born in Buffalo, New York on May 29, 1907. He attended the public schools of Buffalo and graduated from Buffalo's Technical High School.

He worked as a timekeeper for the American Radiator Company while studying accounting, and then worked as a manager for several companies in the Buffalo area. In 1938 he was appointed chief staff aide for the New York State Republican Congressional Committee. From 1939 to 1940 he was a member of the New York State Assembly journal clerk's staff.

Pfeiffer was secretary of the Erie County Republican Committee from 1941 to 1942. From 1942 to 1943 he was personnel officer for the Erie County Board of Supervisors. Pfeiffer served as executive assistant to the New York State Comptroller from 1943 to 1946, and was Deputy Comptroller from 1946 to 1948.

In 1948 Pfeiffer ran successfully for a seat in the United States House of Representatives. He served in the 81st Congress, January 3, 1949 to January 3, 1951, and was not a candidate for renomination in 1950. Pfeiffer was chairman of New York State Republican Committee from 1949 to 1953.

After leaving Congress Pfeiffer relocated to Kattskill Bay and pursued a banking career. He was a board of directors member and executive committee chairman for the Bank of North America in New York City from 1952 to 1966. From 1955 to 1982 he was a member of the board of trustees for the Albany Savings Bank. He was the bank's president from 1967 to 1971 and chairman of the board and chief executive officer from 1971 to 1975.

Pfeiffer maintained an interest in Republican politics, and successfully managed the campaigns of Nelson Rockefeller for Governor of New York in 1962 and 1966.

He was a trustee of Albany Medical College and Siena College.

He died in Glens Falls on July 22, 1985.

== Family ==
Pfeiffer was married to Olive E. Williams. Their children included Jacqueline Lueth (1928-2010) and Betty Lou Coburn.

U.S. House of Representatives
Preceded by Walter G. Andrews	Member of the U.S. House of Representatives from New York's 42nd congressional district 1949–1951	Succeeded by William E. Miller
Party political offices
Preceded by Glen R. Bedenkapp	Chairman of the New York Republican State Committee; September 1949 – September 1953	Succeeded by Dean P. Taylor
