= C. James Roper =

American physician and politician (1905–1983)

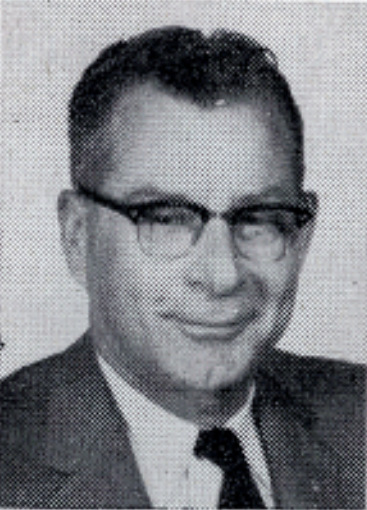

Member of the Georgia Senate from the 41st district
- In office January 14, 1957 – January 12, 1959
- Preceded by: Charles Emerson Waters
- Succeeded by: Charles William Kiker

Personal details
- Born: April 14, 1905 Jasper, Georgia, U.S.
- Died: September 18, 1983 (aged 78)
- Party: Republican
- Spouse: Helen Ellsworth (m. 1932)
- Children: 3
- Education: Berea College; Medical College of Georgia

Military service
- Branch/service: Army Air Forces
- Years of service: 1943–1946
- Rank: Major
- Battles/wars: World War II; Western Front

C. James Roper (April 14, 1905 – September 18, 1983) was an American physician and politician from Georgia. He served in the Georgia State Senate for one term, from 1957 to 1959.

== Early life ==
Roper was born April 14, 1905, in Jasper, Georgia. He attended Berea College, where he graduated in 1928. Shortly after, he began teaching science and chemistry in Austinburg, Ohio. He later attended the Medical College of Georgia, graduating in 1934 with an M.D. He served in World War II in the Army Air Forces and was sent to Europe in 1943 as a flight surgeon, with the rank of Major. He was discharged from service in 1946.

== Career ==
He served in the Georgia State Senate from 1957 to 1959, representing the 41st district, composing of Pickens, Fannin, and Gilmer counties in mountainous North Georgia. He represented an ancestrally Republican district in Georgia. He was known for introducing healthcare bills in the legislature. He was known locally as "the mountain doctor" by his constituents.

In 1982, he retired from medical practice at age 76 due to poor health.

== Personal life ==
He met his wife, Helen Ellsworth, while teaching in Austinburg. They married on June 18, 1932. They had three daughters.

He died on September 18, 1983, at age 78.
