= Wallace L. Jernigan =

American politician

Member of the Georgia State Senate from 5th district
- In office 1959–1960

Member of the Georgia House of Representatives
- In office 1961–1962

Personal details
- Born: June 1925 Wayne County, Georgia, U.S.
- Died: July 9, 2011 (aged 86)
- Party: Democratic
- Education: Georgia Tech

Wallace L. Jernigan (June 1925 – July 9, 2011) was an American politician. He served as a Democratic member of the Georgia House of Representatives. He also served as a member for the 5th district of the Georgia State Senate.

== Life and career ==
Jernigan was born in Wayne County, Georgia. He attended Homerville High School and Georgia Tech.

Jernigan was a funeral director and oil company agent.

In 1958, Jernigan was elected to represent the 5th district of the Georgia State Senate, serving until 1960. In the same year, he was elected to the Georgia House of Representatives, serving until 1962.

Jernigan died on July 9, 2011, at the age of 86.
