= Atlantic, Waycross and Northern Railroad =

Overview
- Headquarters: St. Mary's, Georgia
- Reporting mark: AW&N
- Locale: Georgia, USA
- Dates of operation: 1911–1924
- Predecessor: St. Mary's and Kingsland Railroad
- Successor: St. Mary's Railroad

Technical
- Track gauge: 4 ft 8 1/2 in (1,435 mm)
- Length: 10.75 mi (17.30 km)

Merge to St. Mary's Railroad, its successor and extant, an entry discussing this line's history

The Atlantic, Waycross and Northern Railroad (reporting mark AW&N) was formed on March 6, 1911, as a successor to the St. Mary's and Kingsland Railroad. Its charter was to build a line connecting St. Mary's to Fort Valley, Georgia. On the reorganization, stockholders approved a measure to issue $4.8 million in bonds and $1.5 million in new stock to equip the new line, pending approval by the Georgia railroad commission. The railroad was permitted to issue stocks and bonds valuing $6.2 million on June 9, 1911.

It owned 10.75 miles (17.30 km) of standard gauge track and leased another mile of track between St. Mary's and Kingsland, Georgia, USA. The AW&N served all wharves of the port of St. Mary's and interchanged with Seaboard Air Line Railway in Kingsland. In 1919 the Georgia House of Representatives directed the state railroad commission to investigate the purchase of the AW&N and other lines as a means to extend the Western and Atlantic Railroad to the Atlantic coast. The railroad had planned several extensions, none of which were completed, (Note: The line from Kingsland to Folkston was at least partially graded.) and the railroad was reorganized into the St. Mary's Railroad in 1924.
