= Lemuel Johnson (politician) =

American politician (1844–1918)

Lemuel Johnson (5 May 1844 – 1918) was an American farmer, lumber merchant, judge, and politician who served in the Georgia State Senate.

He was born in Appling County, Georgia to Hon. Dunkin Johnson, a judge who served two terms in the state legislature, and Loujoy née Sellers Johnson. Dunkin Johnson fought in the Creek War of 1836 and died in 1857.

Lemuel Johnson married Anna J. Youmans of Pierce County, Georgia in 1869 and they had five children. He was elected to the Georgia Senate in 1880 and reelected in 1884. He belonged to the Masonic fraternity and was a dictator in the Knights of Honor.

He enlisted in Company F of the 26th Georgia Regiment during the Civil War.

He founded the St. Marys and Kingsland Railroad in 1865. It became the Atlantic, Waycross and Northern Railroad after his death in 1918.

A memorial to "Captain Lemuel Johnson, Confederate Veteran and benefactor of this city" was erected in a park in St. Mary's, Georgia in 1918.

The 1885 Lemuel Johnson House at 401 Gilmore Street in Waycross, Georgia is part of the Waycross Historic District.

== See also ==
- List of former members of the Georgia State Senate
