= New York's 40th congressional district =

Former congressional district

Coordinates: 43°13′N 78°45′W

- Obsolete district
- Created: 1910
- Eliminated: 1970
- Years active: 1913–1973

The 40th congressional district of New York was a congressional district for the United States House of Representatives in New York. It was created in 1913 as a result of the 1910 census. It was eliminated in 1973 as a result of the 1970 redistricting cycle after the 1970 United States census. It was last represented by Henry P. Smith III who was redistricted into the 36th district.

== Past components ==
1953–1973:

All of Niagara
Parts of Erie

1945–1953:

Parts of Monroe

1913–1945:

All of Niagara
Parts of Erie

== List of members representing the district ==
Representative	Party	Years	Cong ress	Note
District established March 4, 1913
Robert H. Gittins (Niagara Falls)	Democratic	March 4, 1913 – March 3, 1915	63rd	Elected in 1912. Unsuccessful candidate for reelection in 1914.
S. Wallace Dempsey (Lockport)	Republican	March 4, 1915 – March 3, 1931	64th 65th 66th 67th 68th 69th 70th 71st	Elected in 1914. Re-elected in 1916. Re-elected in 1918. Re-elected in 1920. Re-elected in 1922. Re-elected in 1924. Re-elected in 1926. Re-elected in 1928. Unsuccessful candidate for renomination in 1930.
Walter G. Andrews (Buffalo)	Republican	March 4, 1931 – January 3, 1945	72nd 73rd 74th 75th 76th 77th 78th	Elected in 1930. Re-elected in 1932. Re-elected in 1934. Re-elected in 1936. Re-elected in 1938. Re-elected in 1940. Re-elected in 1942. Redistricted to the 42nd district.
George F. Rogers (Rochester)	Democratic	January 3, 1945 – January 3, 1947	79th	Elected in 1944. Unsuccessful candidate for reelection.
Kenneth B. Keating (Rochester)	Republican	January 3, 1947 – January 3, 1953	80th 81st 82nd	Elected in 1946. Re-elected in 1948. Re-elected in 1950. Redistricted to the 38th district.
William E. Miller (Olcott)	Republican	January 3, 1953 – January 3, 1965	83rd 84th 85th 86th 87th 88th	Redistricted from the 42nd district and re-elected in 1952. Re-elected in 1954. Re-elected in 1956. Re-elected in 1958. Re-elected in 1960. Re-elected in 1962. Retired to run for U.S. Vice President. [data missing]
Henry P. Smith III (North Tonawanda)	Republican	January 3, 1965 – January 3, 1973	89th 90th 91st 92nd	Elected in 1964. Re-elected in 1966. Re-elected in 1968. Re-elected in 1970. Redistricted to the 36th district.
District dissolved January 3, 1973

== Election results ==
The following chart shows historic election results. Bold type indicates victor. Italic type indicates incumbent.

Year	Democratic	Republican	Other
1970	Edward Cuddy: 50,418	**Henry P. Smith III**: 87,183	
1968	Eugene P. O'Connor: 56,201	**Henry P. Smith III**: 106,984	James A. Peck (Liberal): 1,949
1966	William Levitt: 54,303	**Henry P. Smith III**: 85,801	
1964	Wesley J. Hilts: 81,531	Henry P. Smith III: 90,745	James A. Peck (Liberal): 3,797
1962	E. Dent Lackey: 67,004	**William E. Miller**: 72,706	
1960	Mariano A. Lucca: 85,005	**William E. Miller**: 104,752	Albert J. Taylor (Liberal): 5,621
1958	Mariano A. Lucca: 54,728	**William E. Miller**: 90,066	Hel J. Di Pota (Liberal): 3,354
1956	A. Thorne Hills: 64,872	**William E. Miller**: 117,051	
1954	Mariano A. Lucca: 46,956	**William E. Miller**: 77,016	Louis Longo (Liberal): 2,233; Nick Curtis (American Labor): 222
1952	E. Dent Lackey: 69,087	**William E. Miller**: 102,565	John Touralchuk (American Labor): 329
1950	A. Roger Clarke: 52,363	**Kenneth B. Keating**: 103,710	Marie D'Amico (American Labor): 1,624
1948	George F. Rogers: 85,505	**Kenneth B. Keating**: 90,305	
1946	George F. Rogers: 55,321	Kenneth B. Keating: 84,852	
1944	George F. Rogers: 90,369	Joseph J. O'Brien: 88,782	
1942	Julian Park: 41,459	**Walter G. Andrews**: 91,222	
1940	Robert A. Hoffman: 76,468	**Walter G. Andrews**: 119,972	
1938	John L. Beyer: 50,705	**Walter G. Andrews**: 92,271	August Hein (American Labor): 3,907; George Brickner (Socialist): 551
1936	John L. Beyer: 68,241	**Walter G. Andrews**: 94,682	Melvin A. Payne (Union): 13,593; Thomas Justice (Socialist): 3,481; Edwin Richards (Communist): 408
1934	Frank S. Anderson: 50,532	**Walter G. Andrews**: 69,353	Herman J. Hahn (Socialist): 4,627
1932	Ralph W. Nolan: 54,363	**Walter G. Andrews**: 92,929	Herman J. Hahn (Socialist): 3,209
1930	Roland Crangle: 27,268	Walter G. Andrews: 61,333	Frank C. Perkins (Independent Citizen): 5,126; Thomas Justice (Socialist): 3,535
1928	John M. Powers: 46,860	**S. Wallace Dempsey**: 99,896	James Battistoni (Socialist): 5,973
1926	William F. Sheehan: 27,751	**S. Wallace Dempsey**: 60,310	Thomas Justice (Socialist): 3,689
1924	Thurman W. Stoner: 26,382	**S. Wallace Dempsey**: 66,939	Eustace Reynolds (Socialist): 5,478
1922	Philip Clancy: 21,590	**S. Wallace Dempsey**: 41,754	John W. Slacer (Prohibition): 2,530
1920	Frank S. Nicholason: 19,253	**S. Wallace Dempsey**: 56,129	Augustus Meas (Socialist): 5,389
