= Charles Emerson Waters =

American politician (1910–1979)

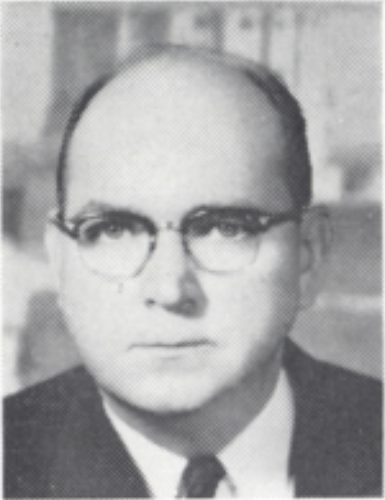

Member of the Georgia Senate from the 41st district January 10, 1955 – January 14, 1957
- In office January 9, 1961 – January 14, 1963
- Preceded by: Charles William Kiker
- Succeeded by: H. McKinley Conway Jr.

Personal details
- Born: November 25, 1910 Ellijay, Georgia, U.S.
- Died: August 29, 1979 (aged 68)
- Party: Republican
- Spouse: Emma Lee Jordan (m. 1937)
- Children: 2

Charles Emerson "Dink" Waters (November 25, 1910 – August 29, 1979) was an American politician who served in the Georgia State Senate.

== Early life ==
Waters was born on November 25, 1910, in Ellijay, Georgia, the son of Emerson Franklin Waters and Sallie (Greer) Waters. He attended Ellijay High School in 1927 and the U.S. Military Academy in 1929.

== Political career ==
Waters, a fourth generation Republican, began his political career serving as a state delegate to the 1948 Republican National Convention pledged to the Dewey–Warren ticket. He served as mayor pro temp of Ellijay from 1950 to 1951. He would later attend the 1952, 1956, 1960, and 1964 Republican Conventions. Waters served two terms in the Georgia State Senate: from 1955 to 1956 and 1961–1962. He was elected to Georgia's 41st District, representing the ancestrally Republican Fannin and Pickens counties. In 1960, he was appointed head of the Senate Administrative Affairs Committee. On February 6, 1962, he introduced a bill alongside a fellow Senator Ed Perry that would raise county officials salaries in Fannin and Evans counties. In 1964, he was initially the only uncommitted delegate in the Georgia delegation, but would later support Goldwater.

== Personal life ==
He married his wife, Emma Lee Jordan, on May 15, 1937. Together they had two children: one son (Charles Jordan) and one daughter (Catherine). He died on August 29, 1979, aged 68.
