= Charles William Kiker =

American politician (1879–1971)

Charles William Kiker Sr.
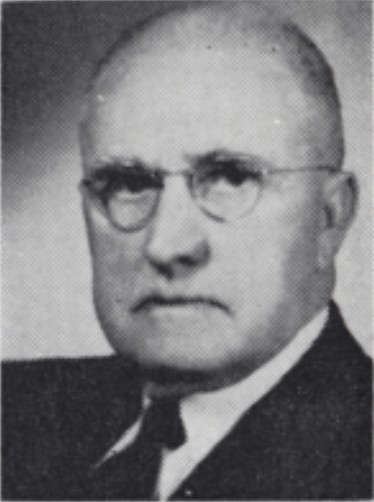

Member of the Georgia Senate from the 41st district 1935–1936 1941–1942 1947–1948 1953–1954
- In office January 12, 1959 – January 9, 1961
- Preceded by: C. James Roper
- Succeeded by: Charles Emerson Waters

Member of the Georgia House of Representatives
- In office January 14, 1929 – January 9, 1933

Personal details
- Born: December 31, 1879 Athens, Tennessee, U.S.
- Died: March 14, 1971 (aged 91) Blue Ridge, Georgia, U.S.
- Party: Republican
- Spouse: Bessie McCollum (m. 1916; died 1973)
- Children: 6

Charles William Kiker Sr. (December 31, 1879 – March 14, 1971) was an American politician who served in the Georgia State Legislature. He is notable for being one of the few lone Republicans representing the legislature in a state that was heavily Democratic.

== Early life ==
Charles William Kiker was born on December 31, 1879, in Athens, Tennessee, to Herbert Noah and Zilpha Ann (Dugger) Kiker. He was the owner of the Blue Ridge and Ellijay Lumber Companies, and was in the lumber industry for fifty years. He was a member of the Blue Ridge Baptist Church. He was a teacher who taught schools in Fannin County and Polk County, Tennessee.

== Political career ==
Kiker was notable for being a Republican legislator in a state that was heavily Democratic. He represented Fannin County which was ancestrally Republican, an outlier from the rest of Georgia. He served in the Georgia House of Representatives from 1929 to 1933, and served in the Georgia State Senate several terms: 1935–36, 1941–42, 1947–48, 1953–54, and 1959–60. On April 14, 1936, he was named chairman of the Fannin County Republican organization. At times, he was the only sole Republican in the legislature such as in 1933 and 1935. He represented the 41st Senate District which composed of Fannin, Gilmer, and Pickens counties.

== Personal life ==
He married his wife Bessie McCollum, on December 31, 1916, in Crandall, Georgia. Together they had six children. He died on March 14, 1971, in Blue Ridge, Georgia.
