= Georgia's 42nd Senate district =

American legislative district

Georgia's 42nd State Senate district
Senator
Brian Strickland; R–McDonough
- Demographics: 56.31% White; 31.85% Black; 5.94% Hispanic; 1.29% Asian; 0.16% Native American; 0.05% Hawaiian/Pacific Islander; 0.59% Other; 5.04% Multiracial
- Population (2020) • Voting age • Citizens of voting age: 191,057; 144,293; 134,112

District 42 of the Georgia Senate is located in eastern Metro Atlanta.

The district contains eastern Henry, Morgan, most of Newton, and southwestern Walton counties. The district includes several suburbs and exurbs of Atlanta, including all of Covington, Oxford, Social Circle, Porterdale, Walnut Grove, and Madison. It also includes the northern half of the city of McDonough.

The 42nd district is a largely suburban and exurban district that is a Republican stronghold; however, the district has been trending rapidly to the left in recent years.

The district is currently represented by Brian Strickland, a Republican from McDonough first elected in a special election in 2018; Strickland won the district in 2024 after redistricting in 2023. Notable former occupants of the seat include former United States Ambassador to Singapore David I. Adelman, Jason Carter, grandson of former President Jimmy Carter and the 2014 Democratic nominee for governor, and Pierre Howard, former lieutenant governor.

== List of senators ==
Member	Party	Years	Residence	Electoral history	Counties
Frank L. Baker Jr.		1947 – 1949	Rome		
Claude C. Pittman		1949 – 1951	Cartersville		
Archibald A. Farrar		1951 – 1953	Summerville		
Tom Clemmons		1953 – 1955	Rome		
Jefferson L. Davis		1955 – ?	Cartersville		
Ben F. Johnson		1962 – 1969		Retired.	
Robert H. Walling		1969 – January 1973		Retired.	
Pierre Howard	Democratic	January 1973-January 1991		retired to run for lieutenant governor.	
Cathey Steinberg	Democratic	January 1991 – 1992		Retired to run for Georgia's 4th congressional district in 1992.	
Mary Margaret Oliver	Democratic	January 11, 1993 – January 11, 1999	Decatur	Elected in 1992. Re-elected in 1994. Re-elected in 1996. Retired to run for lieutenant governor.	DeKalb County
Mike Polak	Democratic	January 11, 1999 – January 13, 2003	Atlanta	Elected in 1998. Re-elected in 2000. Retired.	DeKalb County
David I. Adelman	Democratic	January 13, 2003 – March 19, 2010	Decatur	Elected in 2002. Re-elected in 2004. Re-elected in 2006. Re-elected in 2008. Resigned to become United States Ambassador to Singapore.	DeKalb County
Jason Carter	Democratic	May 20, 2010 – January 12, 2015	Decatur	Elected to finish Adelman's term. Re-elected in 2010. Re-elected in 2012. Retired to run for governor.	DeKalb County
Elena Parent	Democratic	January 12, 2015 – January 13, 2025	Atlanta	Elected in 2014. Re-elected in 2016. Re-elected in 2018. Re-elected in 2020. Re-elected in 2022. Redistricted to the 44th district	DeKalb County
Brian Strickland	Republican	January 13, 2025 – present	McDonough	Redistricted from the 17th district and re-elected in 2024.	2025–present Northern Henry County, most of Newton County, Southern Walton County, the entirety of Morgan County
