= Mitch Skandalakis =

American politician (born 1957)

Member of the Georgia House of Representatives
- In office 1992–1993

Personal details
- Born: Demetrios John Skandalakis; July 22, 1957 (age 69) Atlanta, Georgia, U.S.
- Party: Republican
- Spouse: Kay (Saffo) Skandalakis
- Children: 2
- Education: Emory University (BA); University of Georgia (JD)

Demetrios John "Mitch" Skandalakis (born July 22, 1957) is an American lawyer and former Republican Party politician from Georgia who rose quickly to national prominence in the early-1990s. He upset Martin Luther King III to become chairman of the Fulton County Board of Commissioners and in 1998, was the unsuccessful Republican nominee for lieutenant governor of Georgia. Afterward, he became subjected to a wide-ranging federal corruption investigation of Fulton County government and admitted lying to an FBI agent. He was disbarred but later reinstated as an attorney.

== Early life and education ==
Skandalakis was born in Atlanta, the son of a Greek immigrant, Dr. John Skandalakis, who resisted the German occupation of Greece during World War II and fought in the Greek Civil War. He emigrated to the United States and became a prominent surgeon who taught at Emory University and was named by a Governor George Busbee to the Georgia Board of Regents. Skandalakis graduated from Emory University, where he founded a chapter of Young Americans for Freedom. He then graduated from the University of Georgia School of Law in 1982 and joined the law firm of conservative Georgia congressman Pat Swindall.

== Career ==
Skandalakis ran for a seat in the Georgia State Senate in 1988 but lost. In 1991, he became more active in Fulton County, Georgia's most populous county, as an anti-tax activist. In 1992, he was elected to the Georgia House of Representatives. He attracted national attention when he upset Martin Luther King III in a 1993 special election for chairman of the Fulton County Board of Commissioners.

Skandalakis was re-elected to a full term in 1994, running as a moderate Republican and performing well among gay and African American voters. He made headlines again in 1995, when he proposed that all amateur athletes be required to disclose whether they had AIDS. As a commissioner, he was most notable for cutting property taxes, even while Atlanta was expanding its budget for the 1996 Summer Olympics.

=== 1998 campaign for lieutenant governor ===
In 1998, he hired former Christian Coalition executive director Ralph Reed as his campaign manager and ran for lieutenant governor of Georgia as a right wing conservative. While earlier he had "good relations with Atlanta's gay and lesbian community", he needed stronger Christian credentials to win the primary; hiring Reed was thought to provide those credentials. Skandalakis placed first among five candidates in the Republican primary, then defeated conservative State Senator Clint Day in a bitterly contested primary run-off. Skandalakis's campaign drew criticism for running "advertisements portraying one rival in racial stereotypes and another as a drug addict". The spots from the campaign were cited years later as examples of Ralph Reed's "dirty tactics":

In the autumn of 1998, Georgians were jolted from their armchairs by television ads run by a Republican candidate for lieutenant governor with the nicely onomatopoeic name of Mitch Skandalakis. One commercial played what political writer Josh Marshall later described as "the DW Griffith card," charging gross incompetence on the part of Atlanta's predominantly black political leadership. Another featured an actor who resembled Skandalakis's opponent, state senator Mark Taylor, shuffling down a hallway at a well-known psychiatric and drug treatment facility near Atlanta. The ads were arresting, but they backfired. Skandalakis got stomped by Taylor, while a surprisingly high turnout among African Americans helped produce a victory for Democratic gubernatorial candidate Roy Barnes and other Democrats running statewide.

Although successful with Reed's help in winning the Republican primary, Skandalakis's strategy of negative campaigning backfired in the general election. The ad that suggested that his opponent, Democratic candidate and State Senator Mark Taylor, had ongoing drug problems and was being treated in a rehabilitation center, solicited a legal response from Taylor — a $1 million lawsuit for libel. In the end, Skandalakis lost in a landslide in part because he had alienated Atlanta voters and had made a habit out of insulting Atlanta's (African American) mayor Bill Campbell and other African American officials, "a classic example of racebaiting." These attacks "also offended many whites, who perceived them to be race baiting." He agreed to pay $50,000 to a charity to settle the lawsuit: "in hindsight, Skandalakis said, he regrets airing the ad." Later, Skandalakis's negative advertising was blamed for Republican losses, and he was viewed as "a drag on the [Republican] ticket."

=== Corruption investigation ===
Skandalakis, who had returned to county government after his 1998 defeat, became part of a wide-ranging federal investigation into corruption in Fulton County government in April 2000, when the FBI was in investigating payments made to another commissioner. A local businessman, George Greene, confessed to having made payments to other officials as well, including Skandalakis and his chief of staff. Apparently, from September 1997, Skandalakis was paid $5000 a month in legal fees, $75,000 in total. News of the investigation broke in the spring of 2000; by September Skandalakis had sold the family home in Alpharetta, while his family had moved to North Carolina.

Skandalakis denied, to a FBI agent, having voted on matters relating to Green or his company, but "had, in fact, voted in favor of a contract to install a video teleconferencing system on which Sable was a subcontractor." After a two and a half year investigation, he pled guilty to lying to an FBI agent and was sentenced in 2003 to six months in prison. He was also ordered to pay a $100,000 fine and spend 100 hours in community service. As a result of his conviction, in a unanimous decision by the Georgia Supreme Court in 2005, he was disbarred from practicing law in the state.

=== Reinstatement as an attorney ===
After serving his prison sentence, Skandalakis went to work for Waffle House, eventually becoming a vice president for security, risk management, and loss prevention. He then sought reinstatement as an attorney.

The fitness board of the State Bar of Georgia recommended that Skandalakis be allowed to again be admitted as a Georgia attorney after he petitioned for reinstatement in March 2012. Subsequently, on May 6, 2013, the Supreme Court of Georgia allowed reinstatement of Skandalakis subject to his again passing the bar examination, the court writing in its opinion that

The record shows that since his conviction Skandalakis has shown remorse and has strived to act with integrity and responsibility through his hard work, his devotion to family, and as a volunteer in his community.

On October 30, 2013, Skandalakis again became a member of the State Bar of Georgia, and continued his post conviction employment as an executive with Waffle House.

Party political offices
Preceded by Nancy Schaefer	Republican nominee for Lieutenant Governor of Georgia; 1998	Succeeded by Steve Stancil
