= Senator Butterworth =

Senator Butterworth may refer to:

- Benjamin Butterworth (1837–1898), Ohio State Senate
- Frank Butterworth (1870–1950), Connecticut State Senate
- Jim Butterworth (politician), Georgia State Senate
