= Mary Margaret Oliver =

American politician from Georgia

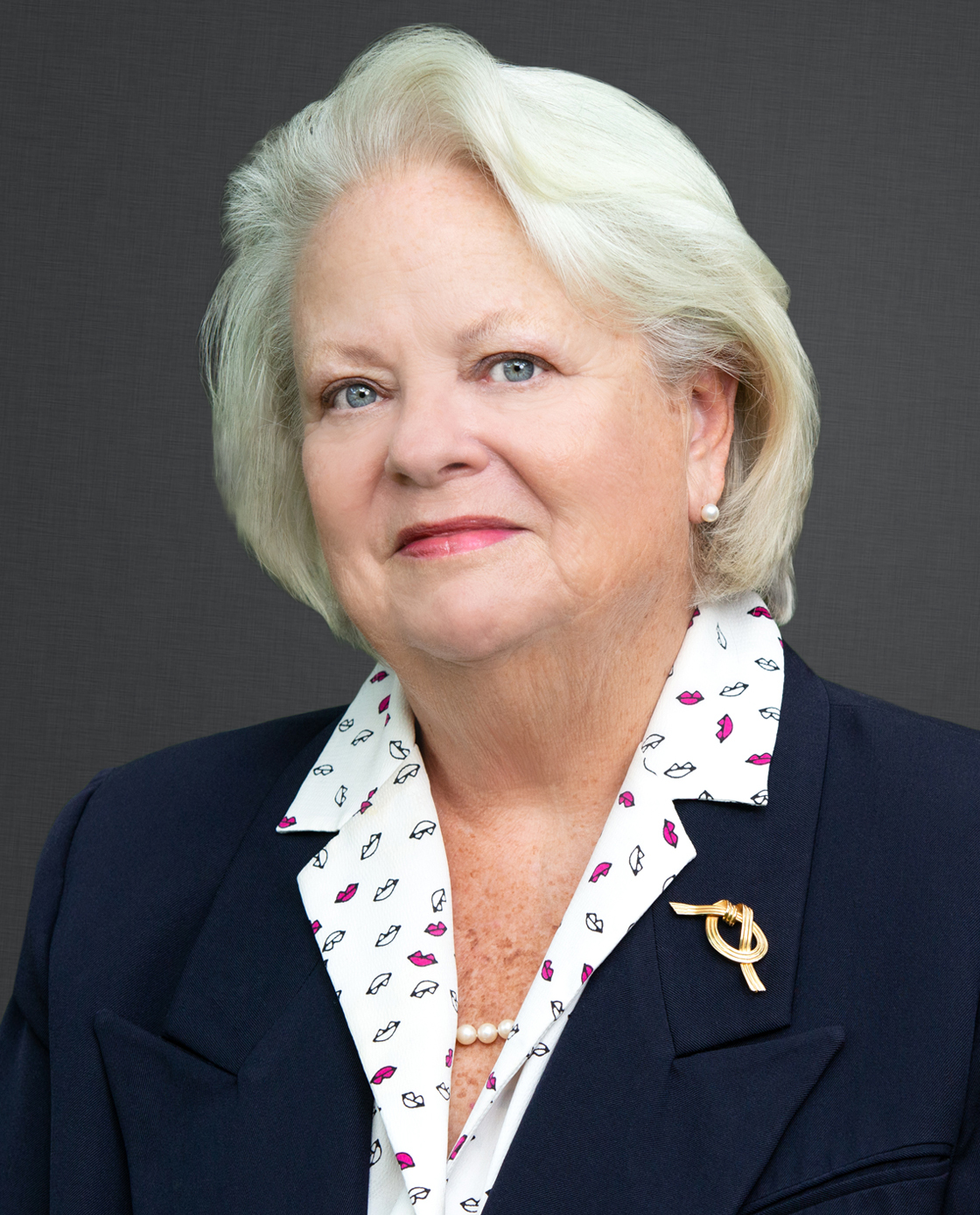

Member of the Georgia House of Representatives
- Incumbent
- Assumed office January 13, 2003
- Constituency: 56th district (2003–2005); 83rd district (2005–2013); 82nd district (2013–2025); 84th district (2025–present)
- In office October 8, 1987 – January 11, 1993
- Preceded by: Peggy Childs
- Constituency: 53rd district

Member of the Georgia State Senate from the 42nd district
- In office January 11, 1993 – January 11, 1999
- Preceded by: Cathey Steinberg
- Succeeded by: Mike Polak

Personal details
- Born: March 7, 1948 (age 78) Charleston, South Carolina, U.S.
- Party: Democratic
- Education: Vanderbilt University (BA); Emory University (JD)
- Occupation: Attorney

Mary Margaret Oliver (born March 7, 1948) is an American politician. She is a member of the Georgia House of Representatives from the 84th District, serving since 2003. She is a member of the Democratic Party. She previously served in the House from a special election in 1987 to 1993, and in the Georgia State Senate from 1993 to 1999. She ran for lieutenant governor in 1998, and led the initial primary but lost to fellow state senator Mark Taylor in a runoff.
