= 2002 Georgia lieutenant gubernatorial election =

- November 5, 2002
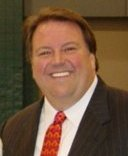

Nominee	Mark Taylor	Steve Stancil
Party	Democratic	Republican
Popular vote	1,041,231	914,312
Percentage	51.87%	45.54%
- Taylor: 40–50% 50–60% 60–70% 70–80% 80–90% >90% Stancil: 40–50% 50–60% 60–70% 70–80% 80–90% Tie: 40–50% 50% No data

The 2002 Georgia lieutenant gubernatorial election was held on November 5, 2002, to elect the lieutenant governor of Georgia, concurrently with the 2002 gubernatorial election, as well as elections to the United States Senate and elections to the United States House of Representatives and various state and local elections. Georgia is one of 21 states that elects its lieutenant governor separately from its governor.

Incumbent Democratic lieutenant governor Mark Taylor won re-election to a second term, defeating Republican nominee Steve Stancil.

== Democratic primary ==
=== Candidates ===
- Mark Taylor, incumbent Lieutenant Governor of Georgia

=== Results ===
Democratic primary results
Party	Candidate	Votes	%
Democratic	Mark Taylor (incumbent)	409,769	100.00
Total votes		409,769	100.00

== Republican primary ==
=== Candidates ===
==== Advanced to runoff ====
- Steve Stancil, State Representative from Canton
- Mike Beatty, State Senator from Holders

==== Defeated in primary ====
- Elbert Bartell, perennial candidate

=== Results ===
Republican primary results by county: Beatty: Beatty—<40%; Beatty—40–50%; Beatty—50–60%; Beatty—60–70%; Beatty—80–90%; Beatty—>90%; Stancil: Stancil—<40%; Stancil—40–50%; Stancil—50–60%; Stancil—60–70%; Stancil—>70%

Republican primary results
Party	Candidate	Votes	%
Republican	Mike Beatty	199,848	44.82
Republican	Steve Stancil	194,444	43.61
Republican	Elbert Bartell	51,610	11.57
Total votes		445,902	100.0

==== Runoff Results ====
Republican runoff results by county: Stancil: Stancil—50–60%; Stancil—60–70%; Stancil—70%-80%; Stancil—>80%; Beatty: Beatty—50–60%; Beatty—60–70%; Beatty—70–80%; Beatty—80–90%; Beatty—>90%; Tie: Tie—50%; No data: No data

Republican primary runoff results
Party	Candidate	Votes	%
Republican	Steve Stancil	90,329	50.54
Republican	Mike Beatty	88,398	49.46
Total votes		178,727	100.0

== General election ==
=== Results ===
2002 Georgia lieutenant gubernatorial election
Party	Candidate	Votes	%	±%
Democratic	Mark Taylor (incumbent)	1,041,231	51.87%	−4.47%
Republican	Steve Stancil	914,312	45.54%	+7.07%
Libertarian	Herbie Galloway	51,218	2.55%	−1.95%
Write-in		788	0.04%	+0.02%
Total votes		2,007,539	100.00%	N/A
Democratic hold				

== See also ==
- 2002 United States gubernatorial elections
- 2002 Georgia gubernatorial election
- 2002 United States Senate election in Georgia
- 2002 United States House of Representatives elections in Georgia
- State of Georgia
- Lieutenant Governors of Georgia
