= Jim Butterworth =

Jim Butterworth may refer to:

- Jim Butterworth (entrepreneur), American technology entrepreneur and documentary filmmaker
- Jim Butterworth (politician), Habersham County Georgia Commission Chairman and State Senator
