= Nancy Schaefer =

American politician

Member of the Georgia Senate from the 50th district
- In office 2004–2008
- Preceded by: Carol Jackson
- Succeeded by: Jim Butterworth

Personal details
- Born: Nancy Smith; 28 June 1936 Clayton, Georgia, U.S.
- Died: 26 March 2010 (aged 73) Habersham County, Georgia, U.S.
- Party: Republican
- Spouse: Bruce Schaefer

Nancy Smith Schaefer (28 June 1936 – 26 March 2010) was an American politician and conservative legislator who served in the Georgia State Senate from 2004 to 2008.

== Education ==
Born in Clayton, Georgia and of German descent, Schaefer went to the University of Georgia and the Atlanta College of Art; she then received her bachelor's degree from Wesleyan College.

== Political career ==
Schaefer became a prominent conservative political activist in Georgia in the 1980s. She subsequently ran for Mayor of Atlanta in 1993, before running as the Republican Party's nominee for Lieutenant governor of Georgia in 1994, where she lost to incumbent Democrat Pierre Howard. She unsuccessfully sought the Republican nomination for Governor in 1998, finishing in third place behind Guy Millner and Mike Bowers with 7.7% of the vote in the party's primary election.

She was elected to the State Senate in 2004 for the northern-state 50th district, where she served until she was defeated by Jim Butterworth in a Republican primary in 2008.

She had also sought to wrest the Republican nomination for Georgia's 10th congressional district from Paul Broun in 2008, but withdrew her candidacy before the primary election.

== Beliefs ==
Throughout her career as an activist and politician, she was a champion of Christian conservative causes, opposing the department of Child Protective Services (a.k.a. Department of Children and Families). After four years of investigation, on November 16, 2007 she published a report entitled "The Corrupt Business of Child Protective Services". After publishing the report, in a press conference she exclaimed that the report caused her to lose her position as a Georgia State Senator. In addition, she stood firmly in her support of the anti-abortion agenda, and also opposed gay marriage. In expressing her Christian beliefs she promoted the display of the Ten Commandments in public places. She was a senior official in the Baptist church, having served as a First Vice President of the Georgia Baptist Convention.

== Murder ==
Schaefer was found dead at her home in Turnerville, Georgia in Habersham County on March 26, 2010 with a single gunshot wound to her back along with her husband of 52 years, Bruce Schaefer, who was found with a single gunshot wound to his chest. Police concluded the deaths to have been a murder–suicide perpetrated by her husband, but the motive for the murder was unclear and never established.

A few years before her death she had published and promoted the report "The Corrupt Business of Child Protective Services", leading to conspiracy theories surrounding her murder.

Party political offices
| Preceded by Matt Towery | Republican nominee for Lieutenant Governor of Georgia; 1994 | Succeeded by Mitch Skandalakis |
