= Lydia Glaize =

American politician

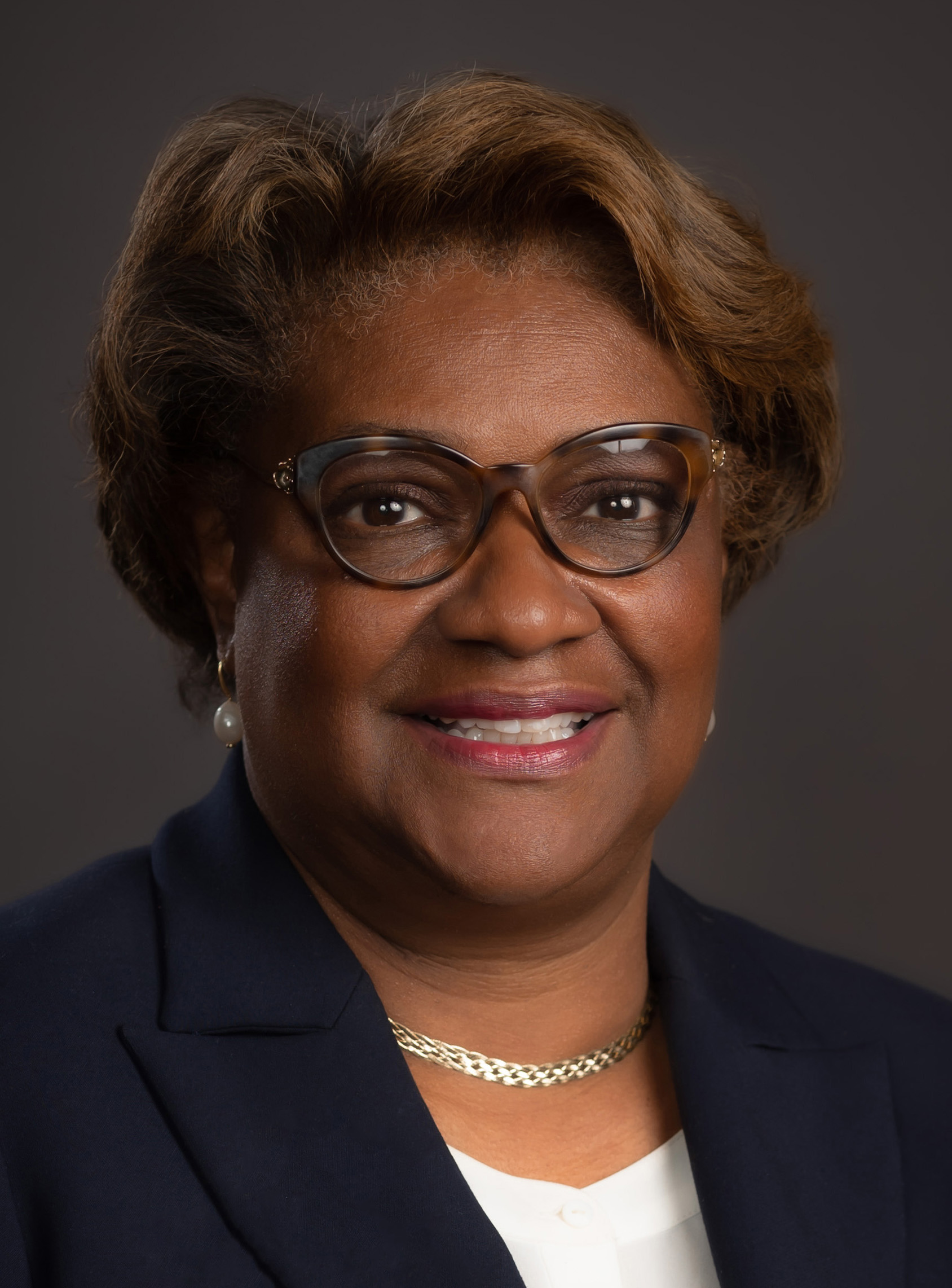

Member of the Georgia House of Representatives from the 67th district
- Incumbent
- Assumed office January 9, 2023
- Preceded by: Micah Gravley (redistricting)

Personal details
- Party: Democratic

Lydia Louise Glaize is an American politician from the Georgia Democratic Party who serves as a member of the Georgia House of Representatives representing District 67.

She has been Labor Liaison for United Way of Greater Atlanta. She is a former city council member and mayor pro-tem of Fairburn.
