= Georgia's 67th House of Representatives district =

State district in Georgia, USA

Georgia's 67th State House of Representatives district
Representative
| Lydia Glaize; D–Fairburn |
- Demographics: 69.3% White; 21.1% Black; 6.0% Hispanic; 1.2% Asian
- Population: 54,420

District 67 elects one member of the Georgia House of Representatives. It contains parts of Coweta County and Fulton County.

== Members ==
- Mike Polak (1993–1999)
- Stephanie Benfield (1999–2003)
- Bill Hembree (1999–2013)
- Micah Gravley (2013–2023)
- Lydia Glaize (since 2023)
