= 1998 Georgia lieutenant gubernatorial election =

- November 3, 1998
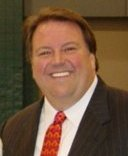

Nominee	Mark Taylor	Mitch Skandalakis
Party	Democratic	Republican
Popular vote	990,454	676,358
Percentage	56.34%	38.47%
- County results Taylor: 40–50% 50–60% 60–70% 70–80% 80–90% Skandalakis: 40–50% 50–60% 60–70%
Lieutenant Governor before election
Pierre Howard
Democratic
Elected Lieutenant Governor
Mark Taylor
Democratic

The 1998 Georgia lieutenant gubernatorial election was held on November 3, 1998, to elect the lieutenant governor of Georgia, concurrently with the 1998 gubernatorial election, as well as elections to the United States Senate and elections to the United States House of Representatives and various state and local elections. Georgia is one of 21 states that elects its lieutenant governor separately from its governor.

Incumbent Democratic lieutenant governor Pierre Howard chose to not run for re-election in order to run for governor but later dropped out of the race. Mark Taylor defeated Republican nominee Mitch Skandalakis.

== Democratic primary ==
=== Candidates ===
==== Advanced to runoff ====
- Mark Taylor, State Senator from Albany
- Mary Margaret Oliver, State Senator from Decatur

==== Defeated in primary ====
- Guy Middleton, State Senator from Dahlonega
- J. Mac Barber, Public Service Commissioner
- Floyd Griffin, State Senator from Milledgeville
- Nick Dodys

=== Results ===
Democratic primary results by county: Oliver: Oliver—20–30%; Oliver—30–40%; Oliver—40–50%; Oliver—>50%; Taylor: Taylor—20–30%; Taylor—30–40%; Taylor—40–50%; Taylor—50–60%; Taylor—60–70%; Taylor—>70%; Middleton: Middleton—20–30%; Middleton—30–40%; Middleton—40–50%; Middleton—60–70%; Middleton—70–80%; Middleton—>80%; Barber: Barber—20–30%; Barber—30–40%; Barber—>40%; Griffin: Griffin—20–30%; Griffin—30–40%; Griffin—40–50%; Griffin—50–60%; Griffin—>60%

Democratic primary results
Party	Candidate	Votes	%
Democratic	Mary Margaret Oliver	137,203	29.27
Democratic	Mark Taylor	99,578	21.24
Democratic	Guy Middleton	88,759	18.93
Democratic	J. Mac Barber	72,449	15.45
Democratic	Floyd Griffin	65,399	13.95
Democratic	Nick Dodys	5,416	1.16
Total votes		468,804	100.0

==== Runoff Results ====
Democratic runoff results by county: Taylor: Taylor—50–60%; Taylor—60–70%; Taylor—70–80%; Taylor—80–90%; Taylor—>90%; Oliver: Oliver—50–60%; Oliver—60–70%; Oliver—>70%

Democratic primary runoff results
Party	Candidate	Votes	%
Democratic	Mark Taylor	155,554	57.65
Democratic	Mary Margaret Oliver	114,284	42.35
Total votes		269,838	100.0

== Republican primary ==
=== Candidates ===
==== Advanced to runoff ====
- Mitch Skandalakis, Fulton County Commissioner
- Clint Day, State Senator from Norcross

==== Defeated in primary ====
- Chuck Clay, State Senator from Marietta
- Randy Poynter
- Pam Glanton, State Senator from Riverdale

=== Results ===
Republican primary results by county: Skandalakis: Skandalakis—20–30%; Skandalakis—30–40%; Skandalakis—40–50%; Skandalakis—50–60%; Skandalakis—>70%; Day: Day—20–30%; Day—30–40%; Day—40–50%; Day—>50%; Clay: Clay—20–30%; Clay—>30%; Poynter: Poynter—40-50%; Poynter—>90%; Glanton: Glanton—30–40%; Glanton—>40%

Republican primary results
Party	Candidate	Votes	%
Republican	Mitch Skandalakis	144,707	35.88
Republican	Clint Day	117,680	29.18
Republican	Chuck Clay	72,506	17.98
Republican	Randy Poynter	36,060	8.94
Republican	Pam Glanton	32,327	8.02
Total votes		403,280	100.0

==== Runoff Results ====
Republican runoff results by county: Skandalakis: Skandalakis—50–60%; Skandalakis—60–70%; Skandalakis—80–90%; Skandalakis—>90%; Day: Day—50–60%; Day—60–70%; Day—70–80%; Day—80–90%; Day—>90%

Republican primary runoff results
Party	Candidate	Votes	%
Republican	Mitch Skandalakis	120,251	51.55
Republican	Clint Day	113,030	48.45
Total votes		253,281	100.0

== General election ==
=== Results ===
1998 Georgia lieutenant gubernatorial election
Party	Candidate	Votes	%	±%
Democratic	Mark Taylor (incumbent)	990,454	56.34%	+2.02%
Republican	Mitch Skandalakis	676,358	38.47%	−4.02%
Libertarian	Lloyd E. Russell	79,174	4.50%	+1.30%
Reform	Michael A. Novosel	11,705	0.67%	+0.67%
Write-in		326	0.02%	+0.02%
Total votes		1,758,017	100.00%	N/A
Democratic hold				

== See also ==
- 1998 United States gubernatorial elections
- 1998 Georgia gubernatorial election
- 1998 United States Senate election in Georgia
- 1998 United States House of Representatives elections in Georgia
- State of Georgia
- Lieutenant Governors of Georgia
