= Bill Hembree =

American educator and politician from Georgia (1966–2026)

Member of the Georgia House of Representatives from the 97th district
- In office January 11, 1993 – January 13, 1997
- Preceded by: None
- Succeeded by: Tom Worthan

Member of the Georgia House of Representatives from the 67th district
- In office 1999–2013
- Preceded by: Stephanie Stuckey
- Succeeded by: Micah Gravley

Personal details
- Born: March 8, 1966 Villa Rica, Georgia, U.S.
- Died: January 15, 2026 (aged 59) Winston, Georgia, U.S.
- Party: Republican
- Spouse: Beth Hembree
- Children: 3
- Education: Johnson & Wales University, University of Glasgow
- Occupation: Educator, politician

Bill Hembree (March 8, 1966 – January 15, 2026) was an American educator and politician from Georgia. He was a Republican member of the Georgia House of Representatives for District 67 from 1999 to 2013.

Hembree represented parts of Douglas County including the large town of Douglasville and his hometown of Villa Rica.

== Career ==
As an educator, Hembree was a professor at West Georgia Technical College.

On November 3, 1992, Hembree won the election and became a Republican member of Georgia House of Representatives for District 98. Hembree defeated Thomas "Mac" Kilgore with 56.77% of the vote. On November 8, 1994, as an incumbent, Hembree won the election and continued serving District 98, defeating Bryce Williams with 59.60% of the vote.

== Personal life and death ==
Hembree's wife was Beth Hembree. They had three children. Hembree and his family lived in Douglasville, Georgia.

Hembree died in Winston, Georgia, on January 15, 2026, at the age of 59.
