= Sonny Perdue =

American politician (born 1946)

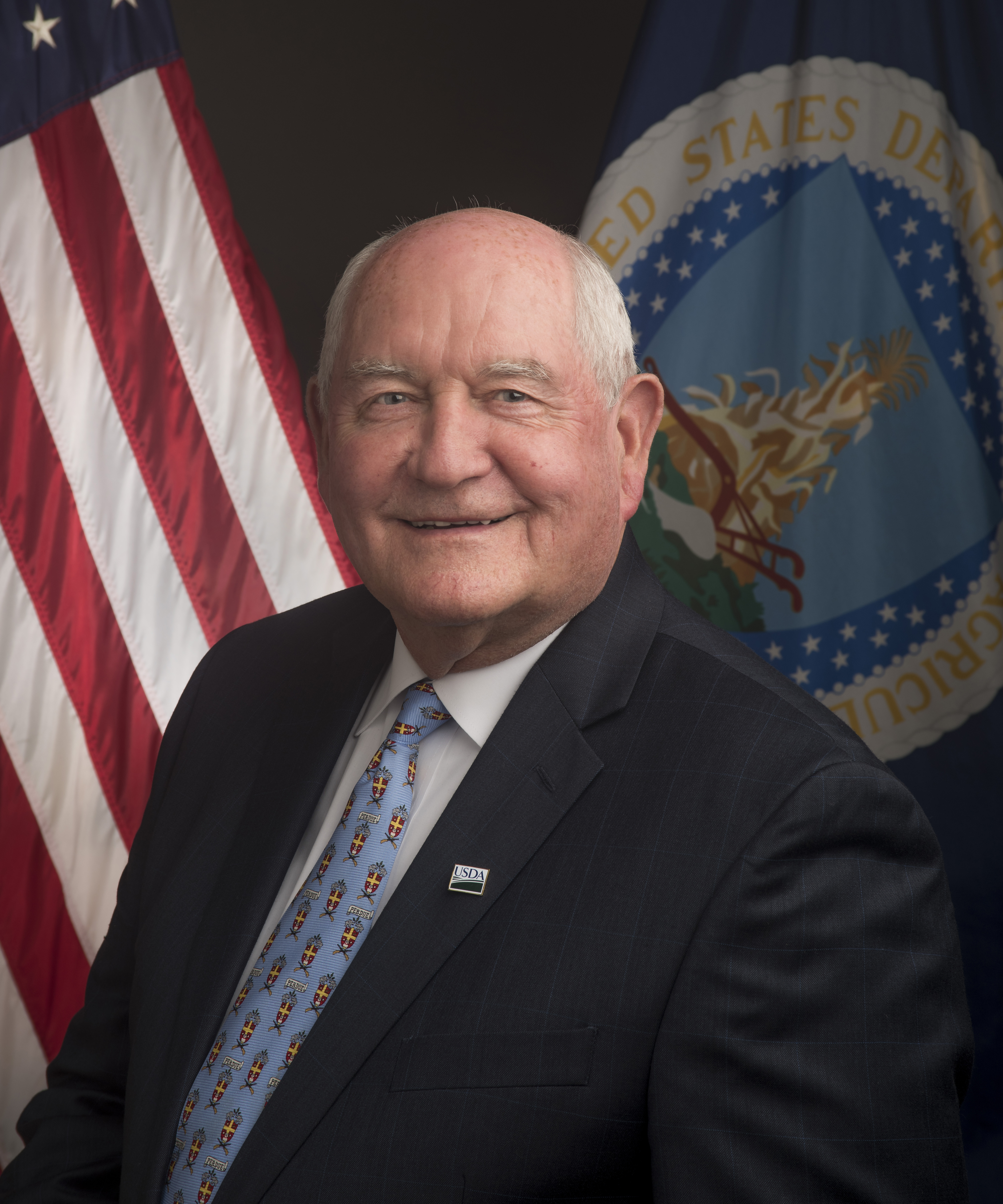
- Official portrait, 2017

14th Chancellor of the University System of Georgia
- Incumbent
- Assumed office April 1, 2022
- Preceded by: Teresa MacCartney (acting)

31st United States Secretary of Agriculture
- In office April 25, 2017 – January 20, 2021
- President: Donald Trump
- Deputy: Mike Young (acting); Stephen Censky
- Preceded by: Tom Vilsack
- Succeeded by: Tom Vilsack

81st Governor of Georgia
- In office January 13, 2003 – January 10, 2011
- Lieutenant: Mark Taylor; Casey Cagle
- Preceded by: Roy Barnes
- Succeeded by: Nathan Deal

President pro tempore of the Georgia State Senate
- In office January 13, 1997 – January 11, 1999
- Preceded by: Walter Ray
- Succeeded by: Terrell Starr

Member of the Georgia State Senate from the 18th district
- In office January 9, 1991 – January 9, 2002
- Preceded by: Ed Barker
- Succeeded by: Michael J. Moore

Personal details
- Born: George Ervin Perdue III; December 20, 1946 (age 79) Perry, Georgia, U.S.
- Party: Democratic (before 1998); Republican (1998–present)
- Spouse: Mary Ruff (m. 1972)
- Children: 4
- Relatives: David Perdue (cousin)
- Education: University of Georgia (BS, DVM)

Military service
- Branch/service: United States Air Force
- Years of service: 1971–1974
- Rank: Captain
- Perdue's voice Perdue thanking producers during the COVID-19 pandemic. Recorded March 23, 2020

George Ervin "Sonny" Perdue III (born December 20, 1946) is an American politician, veterinarian, and businessman who served as the 31st United States secretary of agriculture from 2017 to 2021. A member of the Republican Party, he previously served as the 81st governor of Georgia from 2003 to 2011 and as a member of the Georgia State Senate from 1991 to 2002.

Founder and partner in an agricultural trading company, Perdue was elected governor of Georgia in 2002, defeating incumbent Roy Barnes and becoming the first Republican to hold the office in 130 years. He was reelected in 2006 with nearly 60% of the vote. He later served from 2012 to 2017 on the Governors' Council of the Bipartisan Policy Center in Washington, D.C.

On January 18, 2017, President-elect Donald Trump announced that he would nominate Perdue to be Secretary of Agriculture. His nomination was transmitted to the U.S. Senate on March 9, 2017. His nomination was approved by the Senate Agriculture Committee by a 19–1 voice vote on March 30. His appointment was approved by an 87–11 vote by the Senate on April 24. He became the second secretary of agriculture from the Deep South, after Mike Espy of Mississippi. Perdue served as Secretary of Agriculture throughout Trump's first term.

On March 1, 2022, the Board of Regents of University System of Georgia appointed Perdue as the system's 14th chancellor, effective April 1, 2022. He announced his retirement on April 15, 2026.

== Early life and education ==
Perdue was born in Perry, Georgia, the son of Ophie Viola (Holt), a teacher, and George Ervin Perdue Jr., a farmer. He grew up and still lives in Bonaire, an unincorporated area between Perry and Warner Robins. Born George Ervin Perdue III, Perdue has been known as Sonny since childhood, and prefers to be called by that name; he was sworn in and signs official documents as "Sonny Perdue". Perdue is the first cousin of former U.S. Senator David Perdue by their grandfather George Ervin Perdue I.

Perdue played quarterback at Warner Robins High School and was a walk-on at the University of Georgia, where he was also a member of the Beta-Lambda chapter of Kappa Sigma fraternity. Perdue was named Kappa Sigma Man of the Year in 2005.

In 1971, Perdue earned his Doctor of Veterinary Medicine (DVM) from the University of Georgia College of Veterinary Medicine, and worked as a veterinarian before becoming a small business owner, eventually starting three small businesses.

Perdue is not related to the family who owns and operates Perdue Farms (commonly associated with the brand "Perdue Chicken").

== Career ==
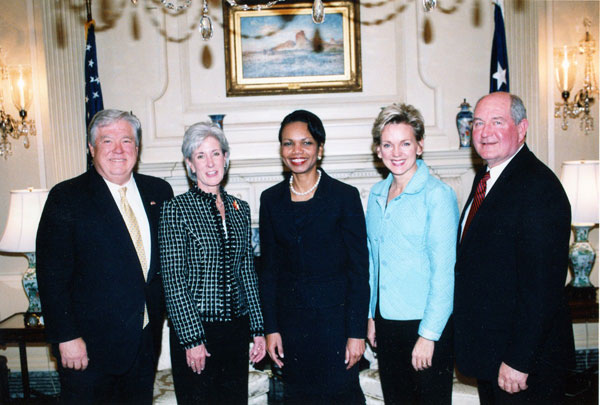
Perdue (far right) and other U.S. state governors with U.S. Secretary of State Condoleezza Rice

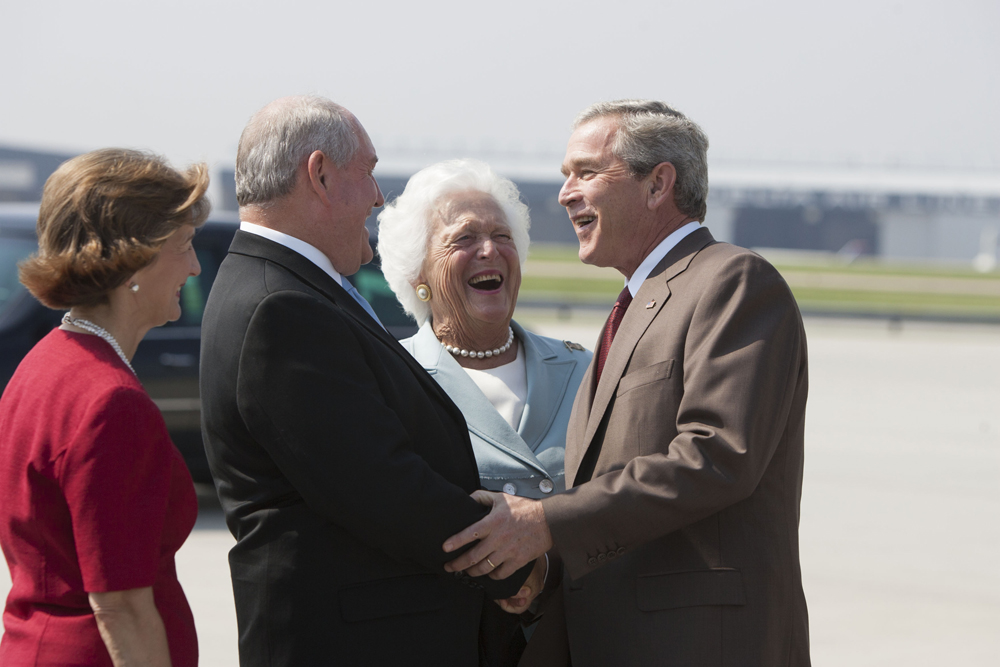
Perdue greeting President George W. Bush and former First Lady Barbara Bush in July 2005

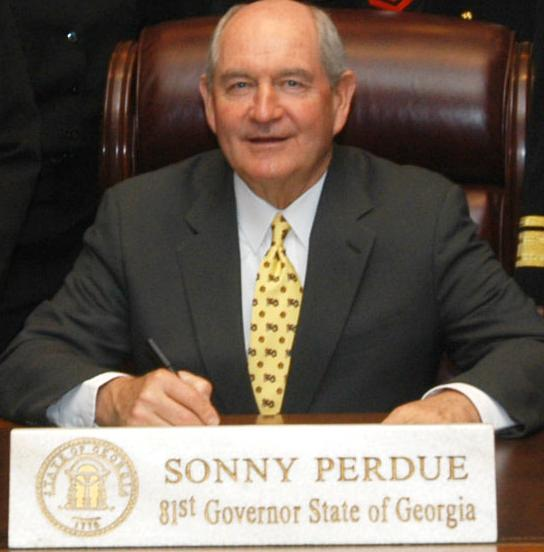
Perdue in March 2007

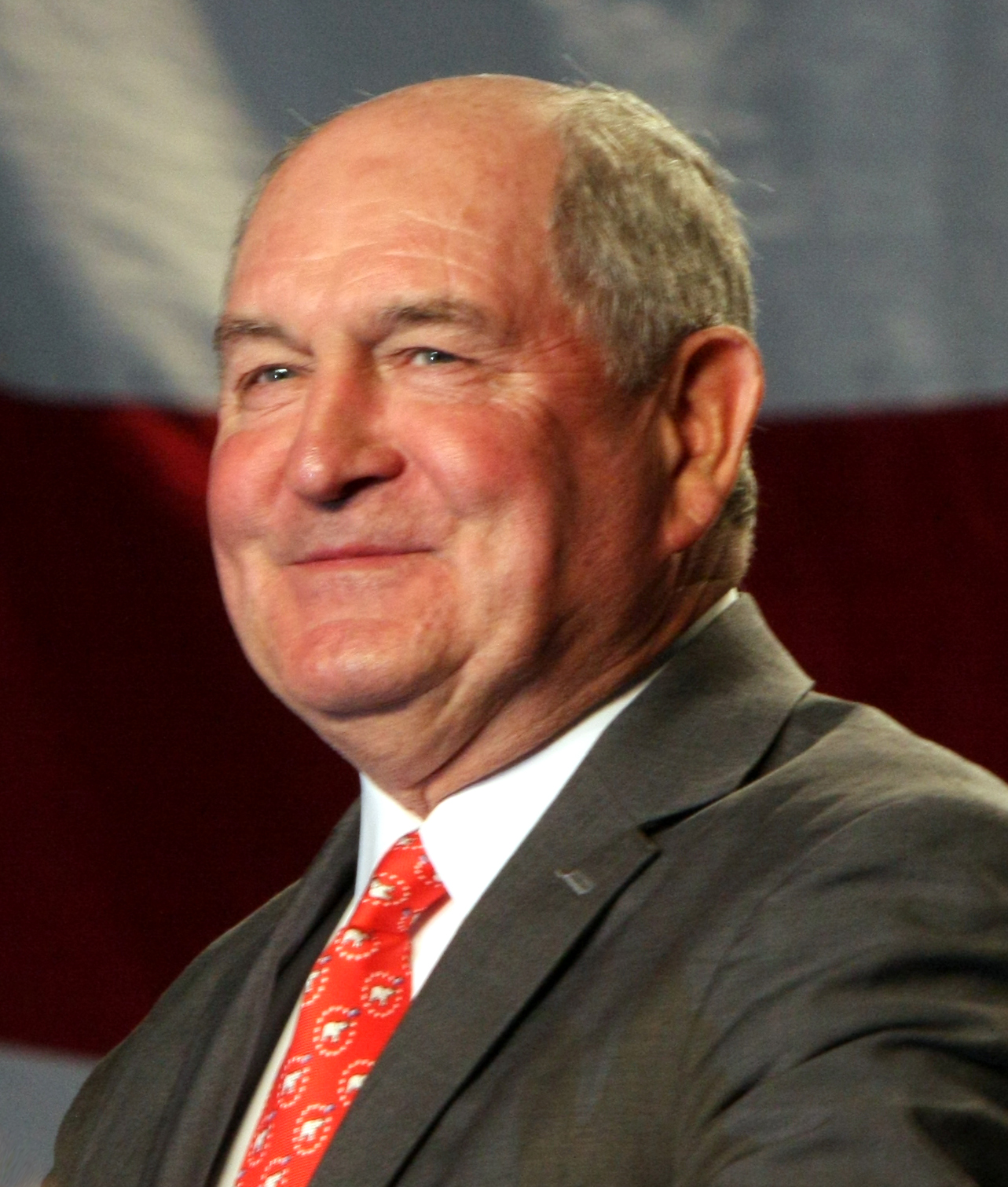
Perdue campaigning for former U.S. Sen. Saxby Chambliss (R-GA) in December 2008

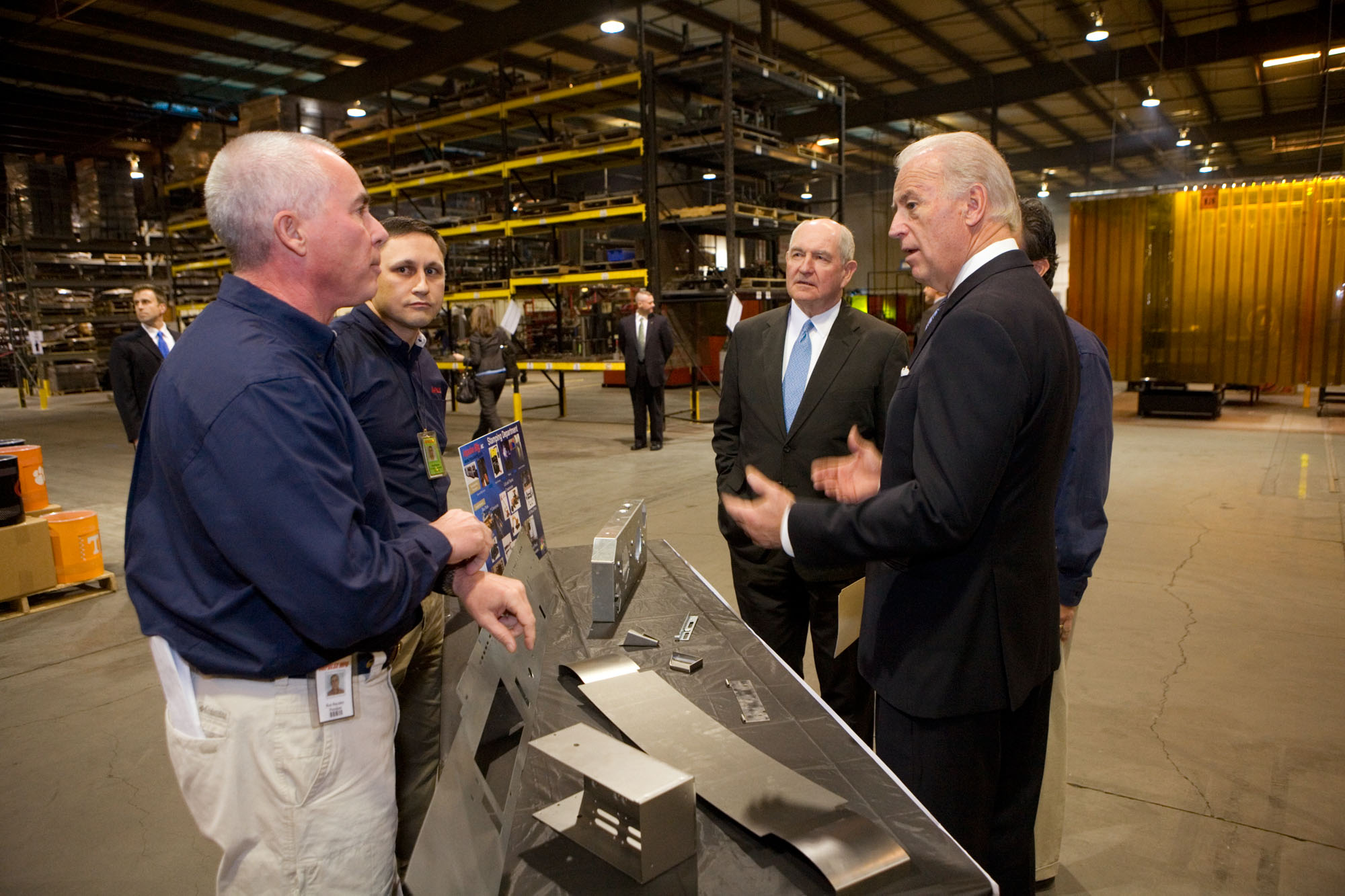
Perdue and then Vice President Joe Biden tour Impulse Manufacturing in Dawsonville, Georgia, December 2009

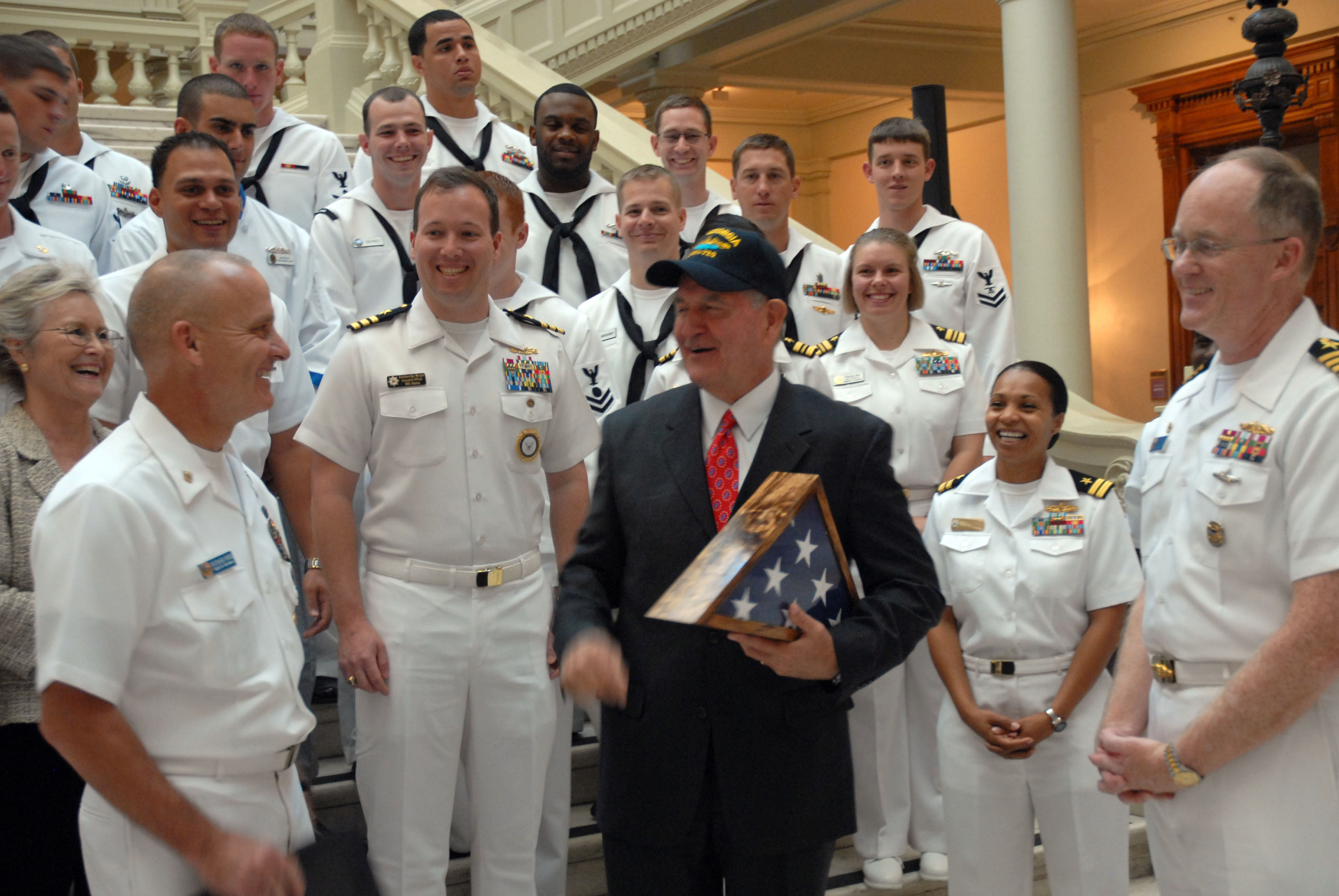
Perdue with U.S. Navy sailors in October 2010

Perdue served in the U.S. Air Force, rising to the rank of captain before his discharge.

=== State senator (1991–2002) ===
After serving as a member of the Houston County Planning & Zoning Commission in the 1980s, Perdue ran as a Democrat for a seat in the Georgia Senate. He defeated Republican candidate Ned Sanders in 1990 and succeeded Democratic incumbent Ed Barker as the senator representing the 18th district.

Perdue was elected as a Democrat in 1991, 1994, and 1996. He served as his party's leader in the Senate from 1994 to 1997 and as president pro tempore. After his first year in office, Senator Perdue wrote then Lt. Governor Pierre Howard asking for more responsibilities, and Howard obliged. He shortly thereafter became a committee chairman, then climbed the leadership ladder to majority leader and to Senate president pro tempore. Many credit Pierre Howard for helping Perdue build the early foundation of what would become his future political career.

His committee assignments included Ethics, Finance & Public Utilities, Health & Human Services, Reapportionment, and Economic Development, Tourism & Cultural Affairs.

He switched party affiliation from Democrat to Republican in 1998 amid feuding with then-Majority Leader Charles Walker and was re-elected to the State Senate as a Republican. He also won reelection in 2000.

== Governor of Georgia (2003–2011) ==
=== Elections ===
==== 2002 ====
In December 2001, Perdue resigned as state senator and devoted himself entirely to running for the office of Governor of Georgia. He won the 2002 Georgia gubernatorial election, defeating Democratic incumbent Roy Barnes 51% to 46%, with Libertarian candidate Garrett Michael Hayes taking 2% of the vote. He became the first Republican governor of Georgia in 131 years since Benjamin F. Conley.

==== 2006 ====
In 2006, Perdue was re-elected to a second term in the 2006 Georgia gubernatorial election, winning nearly 58% of the vote. His Democratic opponent was Lieutenant Governor Mark Taylor. Libertarian Garrett Michael Hayes was also on the ballot.

=== Political positions ===
==== Economic issues ====
Perdue advocated reforms designed to cut waste in government, most notably the sale of surplus vehicles and real estate. Prior to Perdue's becoming governor, no state agency had compiled an inventory of what assets were owned by the state.

In January 2003, Perdue signed an executive order prohibiting himself and all other state employees from receiving any gift worth more than $25. During his governorship, Perdue collected at least $25,000 in gifts, including sporting event tickets and airplane flights.

Late in the evening of March 29, 2005, the penultimate day of the legislative session, Representative Larry O'Neal, who also worked part-time as Perdue's personal lawyer, introduced legislation making capital gains tax owed on Georgia land sales deferrable if the income goes to purchase out-of-state land, also, unusually, making the tax break retroactive. Perdue signed the legislation into law on April 12, 2005, three days before tax day. Perdue then used the new law on his 2004 tax return to defer $100,000 in taxable gains from the sale of land.

In 2007, Perdue convinced a skeptical legislature to approve a $19 million fishing tourism program he called Go Fish Georgia. Perdue then decided that the Go Fish Education Center would be built down the road from his home.

==== Education reform ====
On education, Perdue promoted the return of most decision-making to the local level. After Perdue took office, in 2003 and 2004, Georgia moved up from last place in the country in SAT scores. Although it returned to last place in 2005, Georgia rose to 49th place in 2006 in the combined math and reading mean score, including the writing portion added to the test that year. In 2007, Georgia moved up to 46th place. In 2008, Georgia moved up again, to 45th place. Perdue also created additional opportunities for charter schools and private schools.

==== Georgia state flag ====
In 2001, Democratic governor Roy Barnes replaced the 1956 state flag, which incorporated the battle flag of the Confederacy, and which had been adopted by Georgia largely as a protest against desegregation. In his 2002 election campaign, Perdue promised that he would let the state's citizens vote to determine the state flag. The choices were a modified version of the First National Flag of the Confederate States of America, with the Georgia State Seal prominently displayed inside a circle of 13 stars, or the flag created in 2001 by the Roy Barnes administration. The design of the 2001 Georgian flag was widely unpopular, being derisively named the "Barnes flag". The North American Vexillological Association had deemed it the ugliest U.S. state flag. Perdue disappointed some Georgians by not making the 1956 flag one of the choices on the ballot, despite a campaign promise to do so. However, Perdue was faced with a Democratic House that would not allow the 1956 flag to be included in the referendum, due to its Confederate origins, and he needed support for a tobacco tax he wanted to pass to raise revenue.

==== Environmental issues ====
In 2004, Perdue sued the Environmental Protection Agency to block environmental regulations on reformulated gasoline.

In October 2007, Perdue directed the state of Georgia to sue the United States Army Corps of Engineers in an effort to withhold Lake Lanier's depleting water supply, which had been diminished by a drought affecting the region. Perdue argued that continuing the usual practice of diverting the water downstream to preserve habitat conditions for endangered mussels and other species in Florida and Alabama was an "ill-advised choice" that unfairly prioritized species of mussels and sturgeon above humans living in Georgia. Perdue dropped the lawsuit a few weeks later, citing President George W. Bush's intervention which limited the amount of water that could be released from the lake.

In a 2014 editorial published by National Review, Perdue criticized attempts by "some on the left or in the mainstream media" to connect climate change to weather events. Perdue wrote that "liberals have lost all credibility when it comes to climate science because their arguments have become so ridiculous and so obviously disconnected from reality." In 2019, he said that "we don't know" what causes climate change. When asked what could be causing it other than humans, Perdue said, “You know, I think it’s weather patterns, frankly. And you know, and they change, as I said. It rained yesterday, it’s a nice pretty day today. So the climate does change in short increments and in long increments."

==== Immigration ====
In 2006, Perdue signed a law that gave Georgia "some of the nation's toughest measures against illegal immigrants."

==== Georgia drought ====
On November 13, 2007, while Georgia suffered from one of the worst droughts in several decades, Perdue led a group of several hundred people in prayer on the steps of the state Capitol. Perdue addressed the crowd, saying "We've come together here simply for one reason and one reason only: to very reverently and respectfully pray up a storm" and "God, we need you; we need rain." According to The Atlanta Journal-Constitution, "As the vigil ended, the sun shone through what had been a cloudy morning. In fact, for the next two weeks after the prayer, the state's epic dry streak grew worse."

==== African-Americans in the Confederacy ====
According to a March 5, 2008, proclamation by Perdue, "Among those who served the Confederacy were many African-Americans, both free and slave, who saw action in the Confederate armed forces in many combat roles. According to the Georgia government's website on Confederate History Month, they also participated in the manufacture of products for the war effort, built naval ships, and provided military assistance and relief efforts ..." The proclamation was criticized by historians for its historical inaccuracies, although there were, in fact, African-Americans who served the Confederacy. However, most served in the early years of the war and were either forced at gunpoint or feared reprisals for disloyalty.

==== Disaster preparedness ====
In 2008, Perdue worked with the Georgia Emergency Management Agency to implement Ready Georgia, a campaign to increase disaster preparedness throughout the state. The next year, Georgia was affected by the September floods, which were the most severe in Georgia's recorded history. The floods resulted in Perdue declaring a state of emergency in 17 counties.

==== Go Fish Education Center criticism ====
Beginning in 2007, Governor Perdue began to pursue the goal of making Georgia the "bass-fishing tourism mecca". The administration began acquiring bond money for the Go Fish Education Center near his home in Perry, GA. According to the Atlanta Journal-Constitution, payments on the Go Fish bonds, approved by Perdue and the General Assembly in 2007, runs through December 2027 with most payments $1 million a year in bond money.

Upon the end of Perdue's term as governor, many in the Georgia General Assembly condemned the project and Perdue after an advisory council (appointed by Perdue) began to funnel additional bond money to the project located in his home county. "To me it was a boondoggle because of the amount of money they were spending and the location," said Rep. Alan Powell, R-Hartwell, a member of the House Appropriations Committee. "You have got to have stuff where there is a lot of traffic. It's a little off the beaten path."

The project overall has been scrutinized as a waste of taxpayer money due to mismanagement of bond money and extremely low visitors. The Georgia Department of Natural Resources figures showed 21,101 people visited the Perry facility in fiscal 2015, which ended June 30. It generated $102,077 in revenue or about 11 cents for every dollar it cost to run the center in years past.

==== Ethics complaints ====
During his governorship, the Georgia State Ethics Commission received 13 complaints against Perdue. The State Ethics Commission ruled against Perdue twice, finding that he had taken improper campaign contributions from donors including SunTrust Banks and that he had improperly used one of his family business's airplanes on the campaign, for which the commission fined the sitting governor.

==== Land purchases ====
In mid-2003, Perdue purchased 101 acres (0.41 km^{2}) of land next to his Houston County, Georgia, home. The land was adjacent to the 20,000 acres (81 km^{2}) Oaky Woods preserve being sold by Weyerhaeuser. The land was eventually sold to developers; however, the state was evaluating bidding on the property and keeping it as a reserve. After the state dropped out of the bidding and the land was sold to developers, the value of Perdue's property more than doubled. Perdue failed to disclose his ownership of the property in required financial disclosure forms. In December 2004, Perdue bought $2 million worth of land near Disney World from a developer who he had previously appointed to the state's economic development board. A 2005 tax bill passed by the Georgia Legislature allowed residents to gain a tax break if they sold a property in Georgia to buy similar property in another state, and made the change retroactive to 2004. The new law saved Perdue $100,000 in state taxes.

=== Post-governorship ===
Perdue was constitutionally ineligible to seek a third consecutive term as governor in the 2010 Georgia gubernatorial election. In 2011, he founded Perdue Partners, which facilitated the export of U.S. goods and services. During meetings with Georgia state port officials, then-Governor Perdue discussed his family business's use of a terminal, then started a new export company in Savannah soon after leaving office.

== U.S. Secretary of Agriculture (2017–2021) ==
=== Nomination and confirmation ===
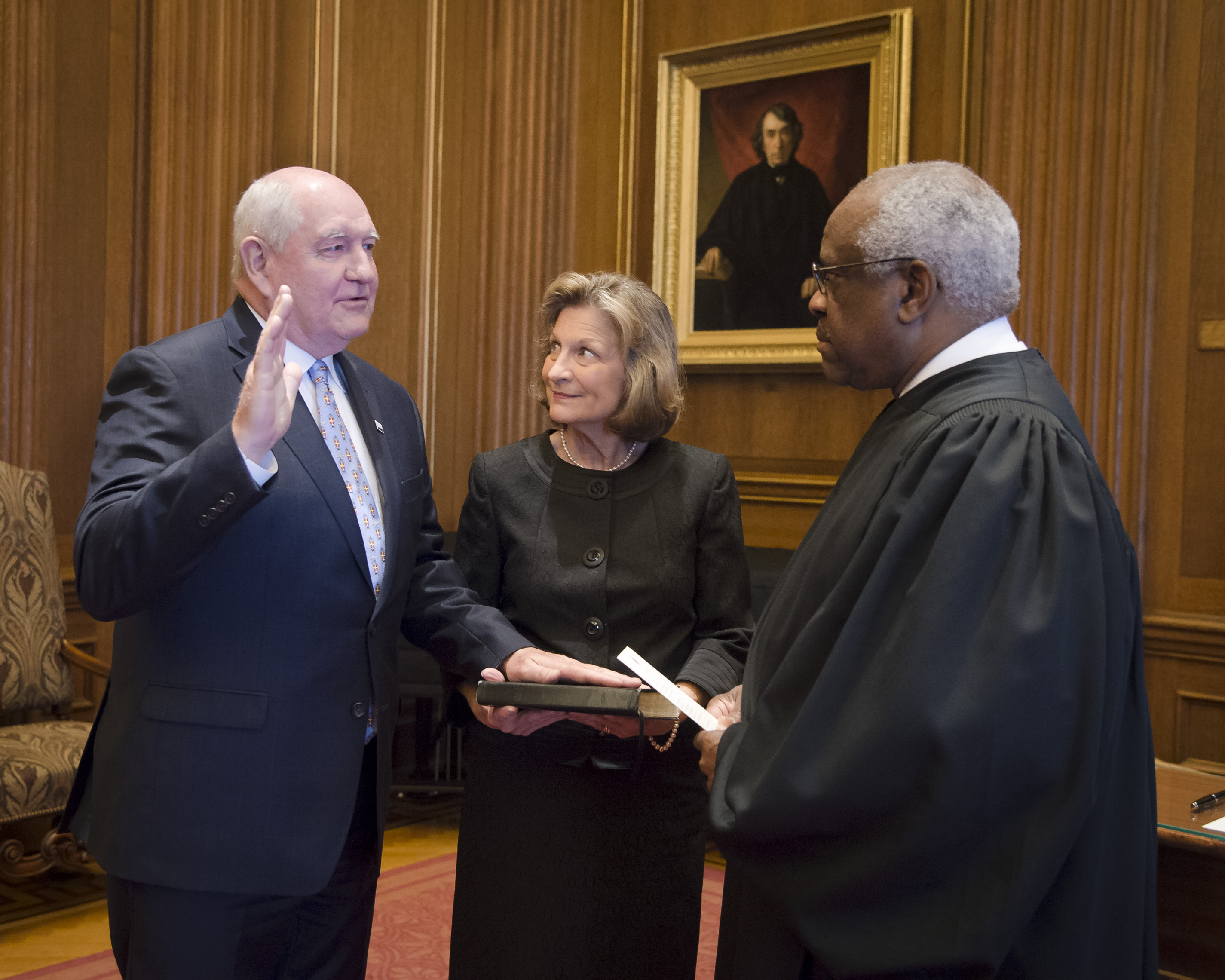
Perdue being sworn in by Justice Clarence Thomas in April 2017

On January 18, 2017, President Donald Trump announced that he would nominate Perdue to be United States secretary of agriculture. The United States Senate Committee on Agriculture, Nutrition and Forestry overwhelmingly approved his nomination on March 30, with a vote of 19–1. The sole vote against him came from Kirsten Gillibrand (D-NY). Senator David Perdue (R-GA) abstained, as they are first cousins. He was confirmed by the Senate on April 24, with Bernie Sanders and nine Democrats voting against him. He was sworn in by Supreme Court associate justice and fellow Georgian Clarence Thomas.

=== Tenure ===
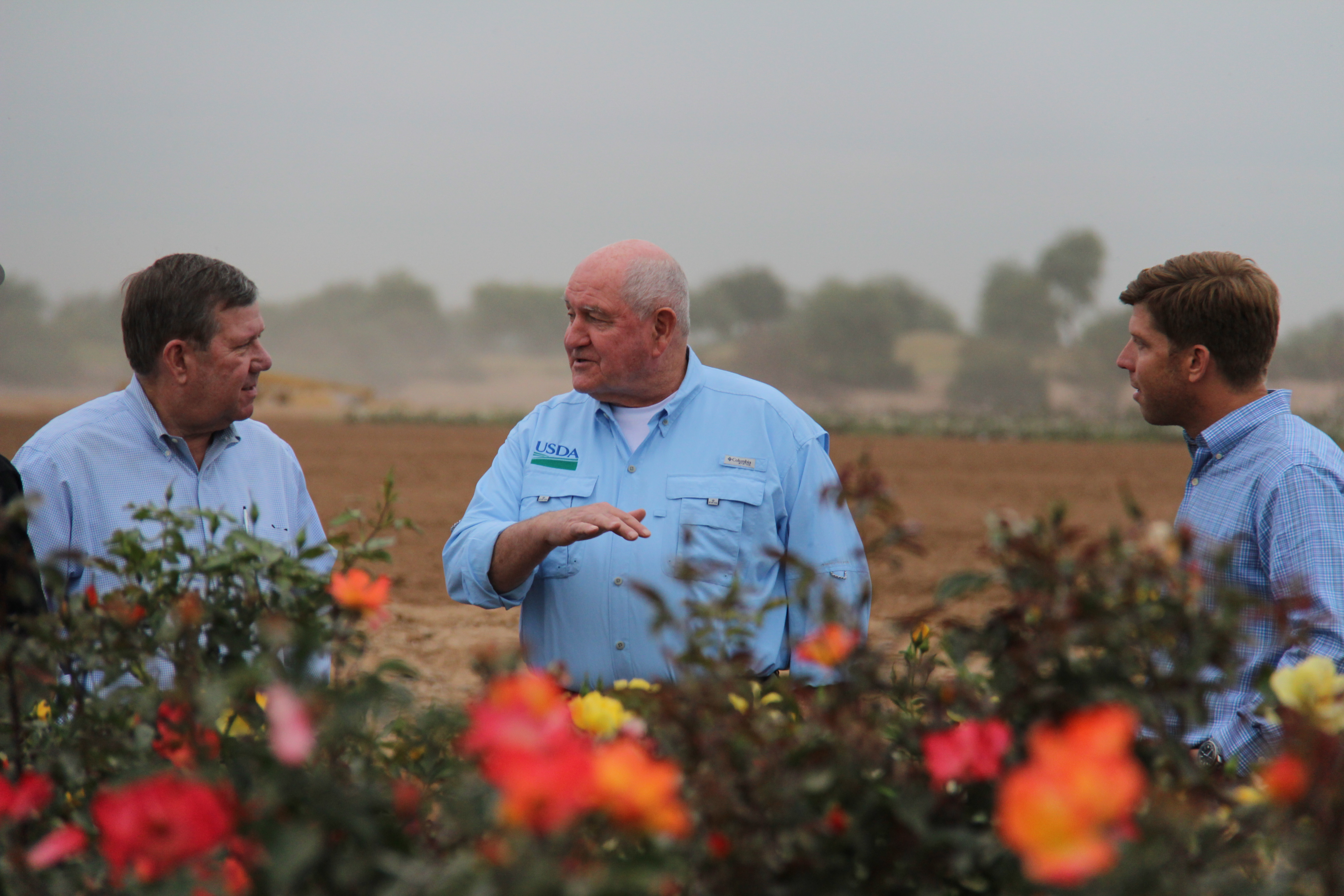
Secretary Perdue tours a family rose farm in Litchfield Park, Arizona, November 2017

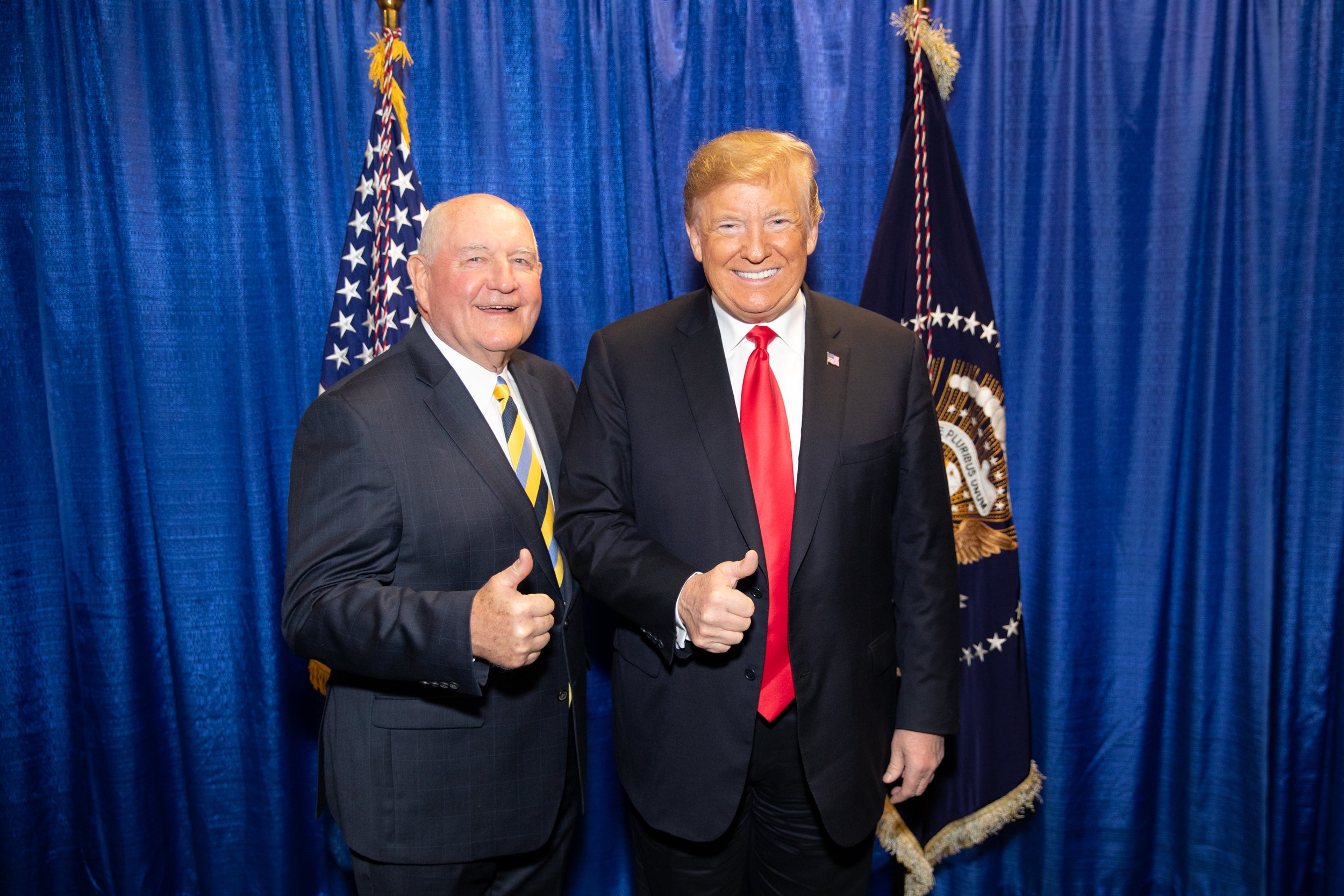
Perdue with President Donald Trump in October 2018

In September 2017, Politico reported that, according to 42 reviewed resumes, the department hired 22 former Trump campaign workers, many of which had no significant agricultural knowledge or experience with federal policies.

Perdue was the designated survivor on January 30, 2018, for President Trump's first State of the Union address.

During his tenure as Secretary of Agriculture, Perdue focused on helping new farmers get started in agriculture. In August 2017, he announced a mentoring program for new farmers. Other issues addressed by Perdue include assisting rural communities, helping farmers operate with less regulation, increasing exports, passing the 2018 farm bill, and addressing crop damage caused by dicamba. In December 2018, he changed the nutrition standards for school lunches to allow more refined grains, allow milk with added sugar, and increased sodium.

In June 2019, in an interview, Purdue said climate change can be attributed to "weather patterns".

In July 2019, Perdue ordered two USDA agencies—the Economic Research Service (ERS) and the National Institute of Food and Agriculture—to move from the USDA's headquarters in Washington, D.C. to the Kansas City metropolitan area. Two-thirds of the reassigned USDA employees chose to quit rather than accept relocation. The attrition rate was particularly high in the Resource and Rural Economics Division (90%) and in the Food Economics Division (up to 89%). Current and former employees of the ERS were strongly critical of the relocation to Kansas City, saying the resulting exodus of scientific and economic talent caused disruption to federal research, especially on climate change and food security.

Under Perdue, the Department of Agriculture (USDA) was accused of suppressing scientific publications for political reasons. Economists in the USDA's research branch were told to include disclaimers in their peer-reviewed publications stating that the findings were "preliminary" and "should not be construed to represent any agency determination or policy". In August 2019, Lewis Ziska, a USDA plant physiology climate scientist, quit after department administrators attempted to impede the publication of one of his studies in the journal Science Advances. The USDA's press office rejected CNN's request to interview Ziska, but not Politico's, where he went on to describe the department as internally fearful of Perdue's open skepticism towards climate change, which, according to Ziska, has led officials to "go to extremes to obscure their work to avoid political blowback".

In February 2020, Perdue endorsed putting a price on carbon dioxide, a climate change policy favored by many economists. He stated that “legitimate, measurable carbon trading” could spur so-called carbon sequestration by giving farmers an incentive to innovate. He was the only member of the Trump administration to endorse such a plan.

In August 2020, Perdue supported the president's re-election while promoting the Farmers to Families Food Box Program; Perdue was fined for violating the Hatch Act.

=== Financial controversies ===
In June 2021, a news story broke of financial dealings Perdue had after his nomination as Secretary of Agriculture but before his confirmation. On December 30, 2016, Perdue's company AGrowStar purchased property and a facility from Archer-Daniels-Midland (ADM), a large American agribusiness corporation that the Department of Agriculture regulates. The property (in Estill, South Carolina) had originally been purchased by ADM for 5.5 million dollars, and independent assessments and government tax assessors agree on that as a fair range; however, AGrowStar was offered the property for US$250,000, a fraction of its value. After the sale, the huge boiler on the property was sold for approximately $500,000, easily covering the cost of the purchase even if the rest of the land had been valueless. A low-ball estimate of the value of storage in the grain silos was US$3 million. Critics argued that the deal should be investigated, and speculated that ADM, which spends millions of dollars on lobbying regardless, used the property sale as a bribe for favorable treatment.

Perdue's assets during his time as Secretary were placed in blind trusts, as is common to prevent financial conflicts of interest. The complex arrangements were criticized as breaking the spirit of the rule, however, and that Perdue and his family's ties to his corporation were not distanced as much as the law intended. AGrowStar (including the assets acquired as part of the Estill deal) was sold by Perdue's trusts in 2018 for 12 million dollars, but due to the secretive nature of the trusts, this was not widely disclosed.

Regardless of whether the deal was intended to influence Perdue's actions, and if it was if it actually had any impact, the Perdue years were good ones for ADM. The Washington Post detailed several wish-list items that ADM achieved: loosening of regulations on pork production, fewer inspections, helping lobby against proposed government bans on glyphosate by Thailand and Vietnam, and promoting ethanol and biodiesel.

Perdue currently makes an annual salary of $523,900 serving as Chancellor of the University System of Georgia.

== Personal life ==
Perdue and his wife, Mary (née Ruff), were married in 1972 after dating for four years. They have four children (Leigh, Lara, Jim, and Dan), 14 grandchildren (six boys and eight girls), and have also been foster parents for many children. Perdue lives in Bonaire, Georgia.

Perdue is an avid sportsman. He enjoys flying and, in a 2003 incident, was accused of flying a state helicopter without a license.

In 2006, while still governor, Perdue made a cameo appearance as the coach of the East Carolina Pirates football team in the movie We Are Marshall, large portions of which were filmed in Georgia.

In 2006, Perdue's financial disclosure forms revealed that he had a net worth of approximately $6 million and received compensation of $700,000 that year.

== Electoral history ==
=== As state senator ===
Senator 18th district, 1990
| Party | Candidate | Votes | % | ±% |
|---|---|---|---|---|
| Democratic | Sonny Perdue | 17,932 | 70.5 | |
| Republican | Ned Sanders | 7,451 | 29.5 | |
| Turnout | | 25,383 | | |
| Democratic hold | | Swing | | |

Senator 18th district, 1996
| Party | Candidate | Votes | % | ±% |
|---|---|---|---|---|
| Democratic | Sonny Perdue (Incumbent) | 28,920 | 100 | |
| Turnout | | 28,920 | | |
| Democratic hold | | Swing | | |

Senator 18th district, 1998
| Party | Candidate | Votes | % | ±% |
|---|---|---|---|---|
| Republican | Sonny Perdue (Incumbent) | 24,543 | 100 | |
| Turnout | | 24,543 | | |
| Republican hold | | Swing | | |

Senator 18th district, 2000
| Party | Candidate | Votes | % | ±% |
|---|---|---|---|---|
| Republican | Sonny Perdue (Incumbent) | 30,681 | 69.2 | |
| Democratic | Miller Heath | 13,647 | 30.8 | |
| Turnout | | 44,328 | | |
| Republican hold | | Swing | | |

=== As Governor of Georgia ===
2002 Georgia gubernatorial election
| Party | Candidate | Votes | % | ±% |
|---|---|---|---|---|
| Republican | Sonny Perdue | 1,041,677 | 51.4 | |
| Democratic | Roy Barnes (Incumbent) | 937,062 | 46.3 | |
| Libertarian | Garrett Michael Hayes | 47,122 | 2.3 | |
| Turnout | | 2,025,861 | | |
| Republican gain from Democratic | | Swing | | |

2006 Georgia gubernatorial election
| Party | Candidate | Votes | % | ±% |
|---|---|---|---|---|
| Republican | Sonny Perdue (incumbent) | 1,229,724 | 57.9 | +6.5 |
| Democratic | Mark Taylor | 811,049 | 38.2 | −8.0 |
| Libertarian | Garrett Michael Hayes | 81,412 | 3.8 | +1.5 |
| Turnout | | 2,102,185 | | |
| Republican hold | | Swing | | |

== See also ==
- List of American politicians who switched parties in office
- List of governors of Georgia

Georgia State Senate
| Preceded by Walter Ray | President pro tempore of the Georgia State Senate; 1997–1999 | Succeeded by Terrell Starr |
Party political offices
| Preceded by Guy Millner | Republican nominee for Governor of Georgia; 2002, 2006 | Succeeded by Nathan Deal |
| Preceded by Mitt Romney | Chair of the Republican Governors Association; 2006–2007 | Succeeded by Rick Perry |
Political offices
| Preceded by Roy Barnes | Governor of Georgia; 2003–2011 | Succeeded by Nathan Deal |
| Preceded by Tom Vilsack | United States Secretary of Agriculture; 2017–2021 | Succeeded by Tom Vilsack |
U.S. order of precedence (ceremonial)
| Preceded by Rick Perry as Former U.S. Cabinet Member | Order of precedence of the United States as Former U.S. Cabinet Member | Succeeded by Alexander Acosta as Former U.S. Cabinet Member |
