= Carol Jackson (politician) =

American politician

Member of the Georgia State Senate
- In office 1998–2004
- Succeeded by: Nancy Schaefer
- Constituency: Georgia's 50th Senate district

Personal details
- Party: Democratic

Carol Jackson is an American politician who served in the Georgia State Senate. She was elected in Georgia's 50th Senate district in 1998. She served as Clerk of Courts in White County for 14 years. In 2015, she joined the faculty at North Georgia Technical College. In 2020, she was a candidate for probate judge.
