= Mike Polak =

American politician

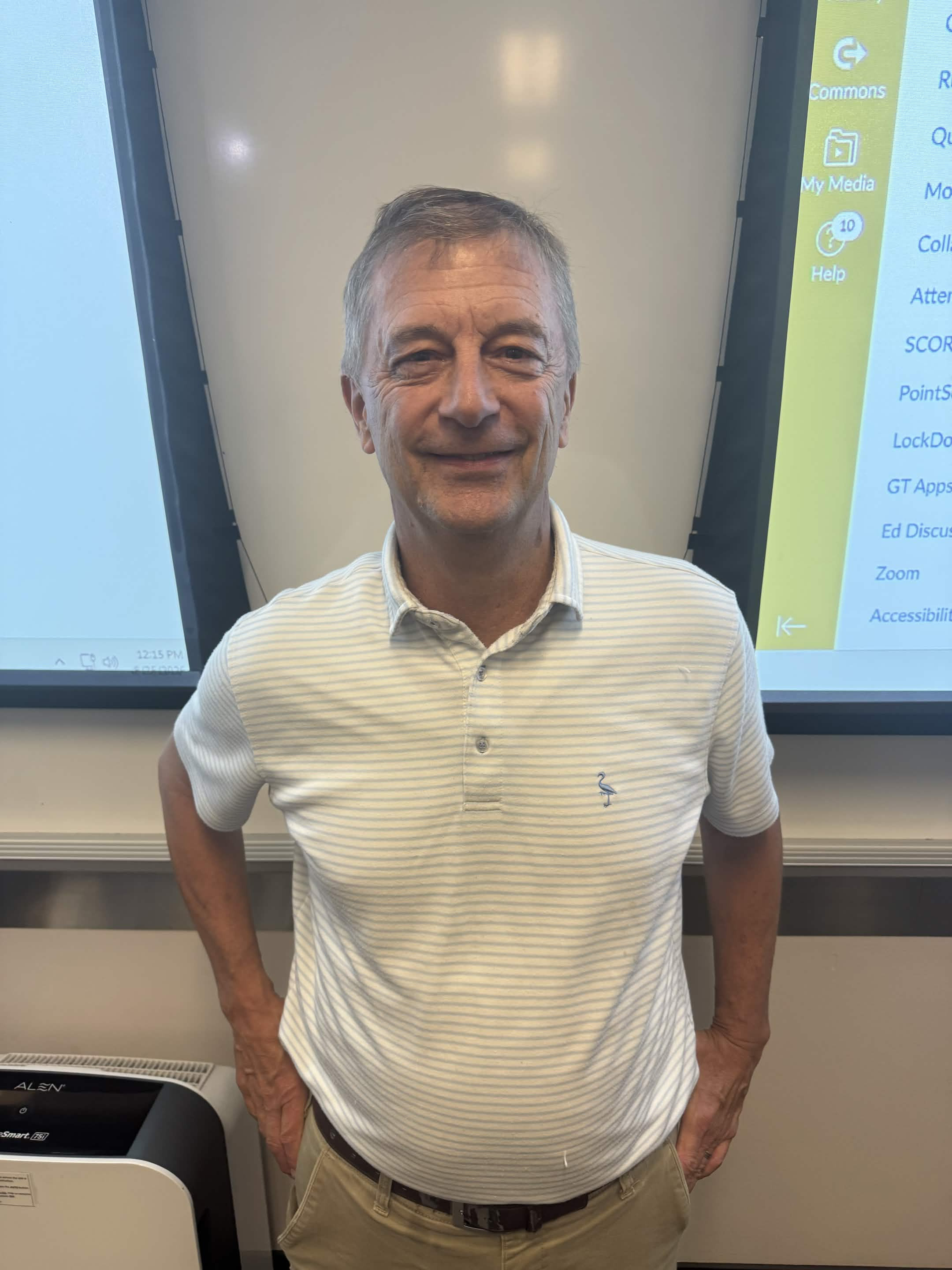
- Polak in 2026

Member of the Georgia State Senate from the 42nd district
- In office January 11, 1999 – January 13, 2003
- Preceded by: Mary Margaret Oliver
- Succeeded by: David I. Adelman

Member of the Georgia House of Representatives from the 67th district
- In office January 11, 1993 – January 11, 1999
- Preceded by: Constituency established
- Succeeded by: Stephanie Stuckey

Personal details
- Born: Michael Charles Polak; March 31, 1960 (age 66)
- Party: Democratic
- Spouse: Holly Lanford
- Education: Georgia Tech (BS); Georgia State University (MS)

Michael Charles Polak (born March 31, 1960) is an American politician who served five terms in the Georgia General Assembly from 1993 to 2003. During his time in the Assembly, Polak acted as chairman of both the Senate Science, Technology, and Defense Committee and Sub Committee on Appropriations for Science and Technology. Additionally he authored the Lottery for Education Act, allowing for the creation of the HOPE Scholarship.

He is currently a professor of the practice at Georgia Tech's School of Public Policy.

== Legacy ==
A Bridge within Fulton County, Georgia was dedicated as Michael Polak Bridge in 2016.
