= Mike Beatty =

American politician

Mike Beatty is a United States politician from Jefferson, Georgia. He is a former member of the Georgia House of Representatives and the Georgia State Senate.

== Political career ==
Beatty is a native of Jefferson, and a graduate of the University of Georgia. He was elected as the first Republican since Reconstruction from Jackson County, Georgia to the Georgia House of Representatives in 1990. While in office he strongly opposed the creation of a state lottery. After legislative redistricting placed Beatty in a district with another incumbent Republican legislator, he decided not to seek re-election in 1992 opting to focus on the small businesses he and his wife owned including a poultry and cattle farm. In the 2000 election cycle, Beatty was drafted by the Senate Republican Caucus to oppose the incumbent Democratic State Senator. He was elected State Senator in District 47 and proved instrumental in the successful battle to ban video poker in Georgia.

In 2002, he opted not to seek re-election to the Senate and declared his candidacy for Lieutenant Governor of Georgia. He finished first in a three-way Republican primary but failed to gain a majority of the votes, forcing a primary run-off in which he was narrowly defeated.

=== Commissioner of the Georgia Department of Community Affairs ===
He was then appointed Commissioner of the Georgia Department of Community Affairs (DCA) in 2003 by Governor Sonny Perdue, a post which he held until being replaced by Gretchen Corbin on August 1, 2013.

As DCA Commissioner, Beatty led the launch of several new community-building programs, including: "Team Georgia" which is designed to encourage collaboration between DCA’s divisions; The "Signature Community" which works with communities and helps them implement key portions of their plans; "Opportunity Zones" to encourage the creation of jobs and businesses in communities transitioning from blight to economic growth; Establishing "Winning Water Festivals" to teach Georgia’s young people about the importance of water to the community’s growth and prosperity; and Dream City partnerships in six Georgia cities to encourage homeownership opportunities in the state.

== Personal life ==
Beatty has been a high school teacher and football coach. His wife is Judy Garrett and they have one daughter, and three grandchildren.
