= Georgia's 50th Senate district =

State district in Georgia, USA

Georgia's 50th State Senate district
Senator
Bo Hatchett; R–Cornelia
- Demographics: 82.0% White; 6.0% Black; 8.9% Hispanic; 1.3% Asian
- Population: 174,927

District 50 of the Georgia Senate elects one member of the Georgia State Senate. It contains Banks, Franklin, Habersham, Rabun, Stephens and Towns counties, as well as parts of Hall, Jackson, and White counties.

== State senators ==
- Carol Jackson (until 2004)
- Nancy Schaefer (2004–2008)
- Jim Butterworth (2009–2011)
- John Wilkinson (2011–2021)
- Bo Hatchett (since 2021)
