= Cathey Steinberg =

American politician (born 1942)

Cathey Weiss Steinberg
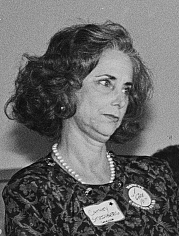
- Steinberg in 1991

Member of the Georgia Senate from the 42nd district
- In office 1991–1992
- Preceded by: Pierre Howard
- Succeeded by: Mary Margaret Oliver

Member of the Georgia House of Representatives from the 46th district
- In office 1977–1991
- Preceded by: George Petro

Personal details
- Born: October 2, 1942 (age 84) Wilkes-Barre, Pennsylvania
- Party: Democratic

Cathey Weiss Steinberg (born October 2, 1942 in Wilkes-Barre, Pennsylvania) is an American politician from Georgia. She served in both the Georgia House of Representatives and the Georgia State Senate, and was a candidate for the United States House of Representatives from Georgia's 4th congressional district in 1992.

== Political career ==
Prior to becoming a politician, Steinberg worked as an adoption caseworker and psychiatric social worker. She announced her candidacy for the Georgia House of Representatives in July 1976, running for the 46th district. She won the election, defeating Republican incumbent George Petro. In 1990, Steinberg was elected to the Georgia State Senate, representing the 42nd district formerly represented by Pierre Howard, who retired to run for lieutenant governor.

In 1992, Steinberg retired from the State Senate to run for Georgia's 4th congressional district in the United States House of Representatives. She won the Democratic primary election against DeKalb District Attorney Bob Wilson. She attained 49.5% of the vote in the general election, losing to Republican candidate John Linder.

== Personal life ==
Steinberg was born on October 2, 1942 in Wilkes-Barre, Pennsylvania. She received her Bachelor of Arts from Carnegie Mellon University in 1964, and her Master of Education from the University of Pittsburgh in 1965. She is Jewish.
