= 1994 Georgia lieutenant gubernatorial election =

- November 8, 1994
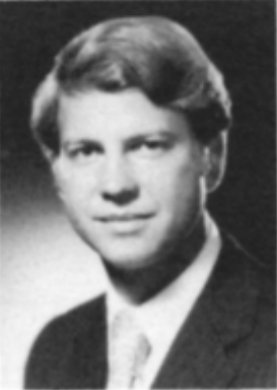

Nominee	Pierre Howard	Nancy Schaefer
Party	Democratic	Republican
Popular vote	808,664	632,490
Percentage	54.32%	42.49%
- County results Howard: 40–50% 50–60% 60–70% 70–80% Schaefer: 40–50% 50–60% 60–70%
Lieutenant Governor before election
Pierre Howard
Democratic
Elected Lieutenant Governor
Pierre Howard
Democratic

The 1994 Georgia lieutenant gubernatorial election was held on November 8, 1994, to elect the lieutenant governor of Georgia, concurrently with the 1994 gubernatorial election, as well as elections to the United States House of Representatives and various state and local elections. Georgia is one of 21 states that elects its lieutenant governor separately from its governor.

Incumbent Democratic lieutenant governor Pierre Howard won re-election to a second term, defeating Republican nominee Nancy Schaefer.

== Democratic primary ==
=== Candidates ===
- Pierre Howard, incumbent Lieutenant Governor of Georgia
- Howard Rabb

=== Results ===
Democratic primary results
Party	Candidate	Votes	%
Democratic	Pierre Howard (incumbent)	347,830	81.05
Democratic	Howard Rabb	81,325	18.95
Total votes		429,155	100.00

== General election ==
=== Results ===
1994 Georgia lieutenant gubernatorial election
Party	Candidate	Votes	%	±%
Democratic	Pierre Howard (incumbent)	808,664	54.32%	−8.38%
Republican	Nancy Schaefer	632,490	42.49%	+8.12%
Libertarian	Walker Chandler	47,594	3.20%	+0.27%
Total votes		1,488,748	100.00%	N/A
Democratic hold				

== See also ==
- 1994 United States gubernatorial elections
- 1994 Georgia gubernatorial election
- 1994 United States House of Representatives elections in Georgia
- State of Georgia
- Lieutenant Governors of Georgia
