= 2006 Georgia gubernatorial election =

- November 7, 2006
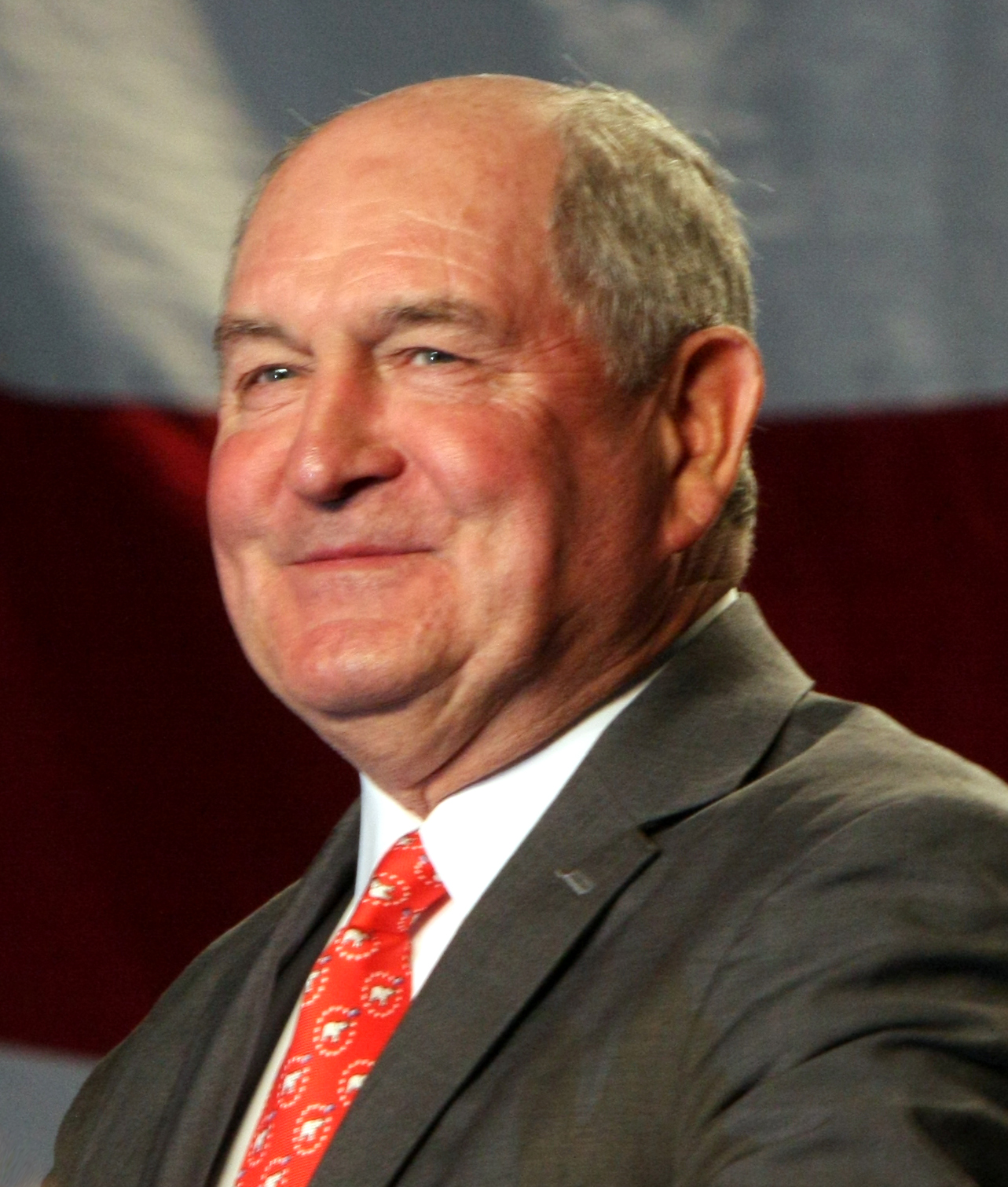

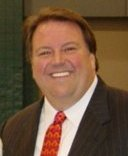
Nominee	Sonny Perdue	Mark Taylor
Party	Republican	Democratic
Popular vote	1,229,724	811,049
Percentage	57.95%	38.22%
- Perdue: 40–50% 50–60% 60–70% 70–80% 80–90% >90% Taylor: 40–50% 50–60% 60–70% 70–80% 80–90% >90% Tie: 40–50% 50% No data
Governor before election
Sonny Perdue
Republican
Elected Governor
Sonny Perdue
Republican

The 2006 Georgia gubernatorial election was held on November 7, 2006. Georgia incumbent Republican governor Sonny Perdue ran for re-election to a second and final term as governor. Governor Perdue was renominated by the Republican Party, defeating a minor opponent in the process, while Lieutenant Governor Mark Taylor narrowly emerged victorious from a competitive Democratic primary. In the general election, though Taylor ran a spirited campaign, Perdue was aided by the increasing tendency of the state to vote for Republicans and by his popularity with the public; polling showed his approval ratings above sixty percent. In the end, Perdue was overwhelmingly re-elected as governor, defeating Taylor in a landslide, becoming the first Republican governor of Georgia to ever be reelected. As of 2024, this is the last time that Muscogee, Warren, Rockdale, Chatham, and Bibb counties voted for the Republican candidate for governor and the last time that Marion, Telfair, and Wheeler counties voted for the Democratic candidate.

Exit polls showed that Perdue won white voters (68% to 27%) while Taylor won black voters (81% to 17%). As of 2025, Perdue's 17% of the African American vote is the highest showing of any Republican seeking statewide office in Georgia.

== Democratic primary ==
=== Candidates ===
- Bill Bolton
- Cathy Cox, Secretary of State of Georgia
- Mac McCarley
- Mark Taylor, Lieutenant Governor of Georgia

=== Results ===
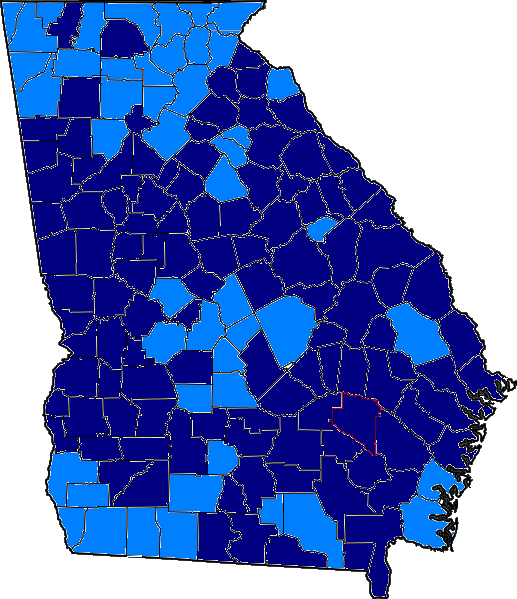
2006 Georgia Democratic gubernatorial primary. Dark blue indicates Taylor, while light blue indicates Cox.

Democratic primary results
Party	Candidate	Votes	%
Democratic	Mark Taylor	249,188	52.1%
Democratic	Cathy Cox	211,978	44.3%
Democratic	Bill Bolton	10,552	1.7%
Democratic	Mac McCarley	10,399	0.6%
Total votes		482,117	100

== Republican primary ==
=== Candidates ===
- Ray McBerry, businessman
- Sonny Perdue, incumbent governor of Georgia

=== Results ===
Republican primary results
Party	Candidate	Votes	%
Republican	Sonny Perdue (incumbent)	370,756	88.4%
Republican	Ray McBerry	48,498	12.6%
Total votes		419,254	100

== General election ==
=== Fundraising ===
Perdue had more financial resources on hand than Taylor. As of the March 31 filing, Perdue reported that he had over $8.2 million on hand, while Taylor had $4.2 million in reserve. Perdue had the added advantage of facing a weak opponent in Ray McBerry in the primary election, while Cox and Taylor engaged in a bitter struggle for the Democratic nomination. Garrett Hayes, the Libertarian candidate, reported less than $1,000 on hand, though the October 31 Zogby poll showed him attracting a surprising 9.1 percent of polled voters.

=== Advertisements ===
A minor controversy developed during the primary campaign over an ad created by Georgians for Truth, a group founded by several prominent Democratic fundraisers. The ad criticized Perdue for allegedly failing to pay his taxes for several years before becoming governor, allegations that had been made in the 2002 campaign as well. Cox and Taylor, for reasons that are not clear, requested that the group not run the ad, prompting the Georgia Democratic Party chairman, Bobby Kahn, to strongly rebuke the group's members.

=== Predictions ===
Source	Ranking	As of
The Cook Political Report	Lean R	November 6, 2006
Sabato's Crystal Ball	Safe R	November 6, 2006
Rothenberg Political Report	Safe R	November 2, 2006
Real Clear Politics	Likely R	November 6, 2006

=== Campaign issues ===
==== Education ====
- The HOPE Scholarship program and its stability and continued solvency are recurring issues in Georgia politics. Citing budget constraints, Perdue signed Republican-sponsored legislation that significantly cut the benefits conferred by the program. Cox and Taylor both severely criticized the governor for these actions, and both pointed to the fact that Perdue voted against the legislation creating the program as a state senator in 1993. Perdue backed an amendment to the state constitution that would have shifted the allocation of the lottery funds that support the program, but the legislation was defeated.

On April 19, 2006, Cox charged that Taylor had not sponsored the HOPE scholarship legislation in 1993, as he claimed. Taylor apparently sponsored a companion bill that did not pass, although he supported the bill that did pass. The incident portended a strongly negative campaign for the Democratic nomination.

- College tuition may also be an issue. During Perdue's first term, Georgia's universities substantially increased tuition fees.
- School funding: Perdue successfully backed legislation that requires Georgia schools to spend at least 65% of their budgets "in the classroom". Democrats charged that some school programs, such as music classes, do not fit the definition of "in the classroom."

==== Health care ====
- PeachCare, a state program providing medical care for needy children and families, emerged as a point of contention between Perdue and his challengers. Perdue approved a cut in the program during his administration. Taylor, a strong supporter of the program, was particularly vocal in attacking Perdue and advocating significant expansion of the program.
- Perdue made Medicaid reform a priority during his first term. Democrats were critical of the reform proposal that Perdue presented to federal officials.

==== Immigration ====
The problem presented by illegal immigrants emerged during Georgia's 2006 legislative session as an issue likely to have a large impact on the gubernatorial campaign. Perdue signed legislation restricting the ability of illegal immigrants to access state resources, including health care and public education.

==== Voting ====
- Voter identification legislation signed by Perdue requiring photo identification for voting while expanding absentee voting opportunities had a substantial impact on the campaign. Democrats strongly denounced the legislation as discriminatory against the poor and elderly, while Republicans attempted to alleviate such concerns by providing access to photo identification for those not possessing it.
- Paper ballots were a major concern of Taylor supporters, who felt that Cox made a mistake when she brought electronic voting to Georgia as secretary of state.

=== Polling ===
Source	Date	Taylor (D)	Perdue (R)	Hayes (L)
Strategic Vision	Nov. 1, 2006	36%	52%	5%
Strategic Vision	Oct. 25, 2006	32%	51%	9%
Strategic Vision	September 27, 2006	39%	51%	4%
Zogby/WSJ	September 11, 2006	34.9%	47.4%	8.1%
Zogby/WSJ	August 28, 2006	40.7%	51.3%	
Strategic Vision	August 23, 2006	41%	54%	
Rasmussen	August 4, 2006	39%	53%	
Zogby/WSJ	July 24, 2006	39.3%	52.1%	
Strategic Vision	June 28, 2006	44%	50%	
Zogby/WSJ	June 21, 2006	40%	48.6%	
Strategic Vision	May 10, 2006	39%	51%	
Rasmussen	May 6, 2006	36%	51%	
Rasmussen	March 26, 2006	41%	51%	
Strategic Vision	March 8, 2006	33%	57%	
Rasmussen	Feb 16, 2006	33%	53%	
Strategic Vision	Jan 25, 2006	36%	57%	
Strategic Vision	Dec 7, 2005	38%	55%	
Strategic Vision	Oct 26, 2005	37%	55%	
Strategic Vision	Aug 4, 2005	40%	52%	
Strategic Vision	May 13, 2005	42%	50%	
Strategic Vision	Feb 11, 2005	44%	50%	

=== Results ===
Georgia gubernatorial election, 2006
Party	Candidate	Votes	%	±%
Republican	Sonny Perdue (incumbent)	1,229,724	57.95%	+6.53%
Democratic	Mark Taylor	811,049	38.22%	−8.03%
Libertarian	Garrett Michael Hayes	81,412	3.83%	+1.50%
Majority		418,675	19.73%	+14.56%
Turnout		2,122,185		
Republican hold		Swing		

==== Counties that flipped from Democratic to Republican ====
- Early (largest city: Blakely)
- McIntosh (largest municipality: Darien)
- Lowndes (largest city: Valdosta)
- Burke (largest municipality: Waynesboro)
- Chatham (largest city: Savannah)
- Washington (largest municipality: Sandersville)
- Sumter (largest city: Americus)
- Jefferson (largest city: Louisville)
- Muscogee (largest city: Columbus)
- Meriwether (largest municipality: Manchester)
- Telfair (largest municipality: McRae-Helena)
- Bibb (largest city: Macon)
- Wheeler (largest city: Alamo)
- Wilkes (largest city: Washington)
- Grady (largest city: Cairo)
- Thomas (largest town: Thomasville)

==== Counties that flipped from Republican to Democratic ====
- Dooly (largest city: Vienna) (previously tied)

== See also ==
- U.S. gubernatorial elections, 2006
- Governors of Georgia
