= Frank Sutton (politician) =

American politician (1930–2020)

Member of the Georgia State Senate from the 9th district
- In office 1971–1983
- Preceded by: Ford Spinks
- Succeeded by: R. T. Phillips

Personal details
- Born: Jared Franklin Sutton; April 1930 Colquitt County, Georgia, U.S.
- Died: July 16, 2020 (aged 90)
- Party: Democratic
- Spouse: Bobbery Pope
- Children: 3
- Education: Abraham Baldwin Agricultural College; University of Georgia

Jared Franklin Sutton (April 1930 – July 16, 2020) was an American politician. He served as a Democratic member for the 9th district of the Georgia State Senate.

== Life and career ==
Sutton was born in Colquitt County, Georgia, the son of Martha Baker and James Young Sutton. He attended Abraham Baldwin Agricultural College and the University of Georgia.

In 1971, Sutton was elected to represent the 9th district of the Georgia State Senate. He served until 1983, when he was succeeded by R. T. Phillips.

Sutton died on July 16, 2020, at the age of 90.

Party political offices
Preceded by James W. "Jim" Webb, II	Republican nominee for Lieutenant Governor of Georgia; 1982	Vacant Title next held by Matt Towery
