= Micah Gravley =

American politician

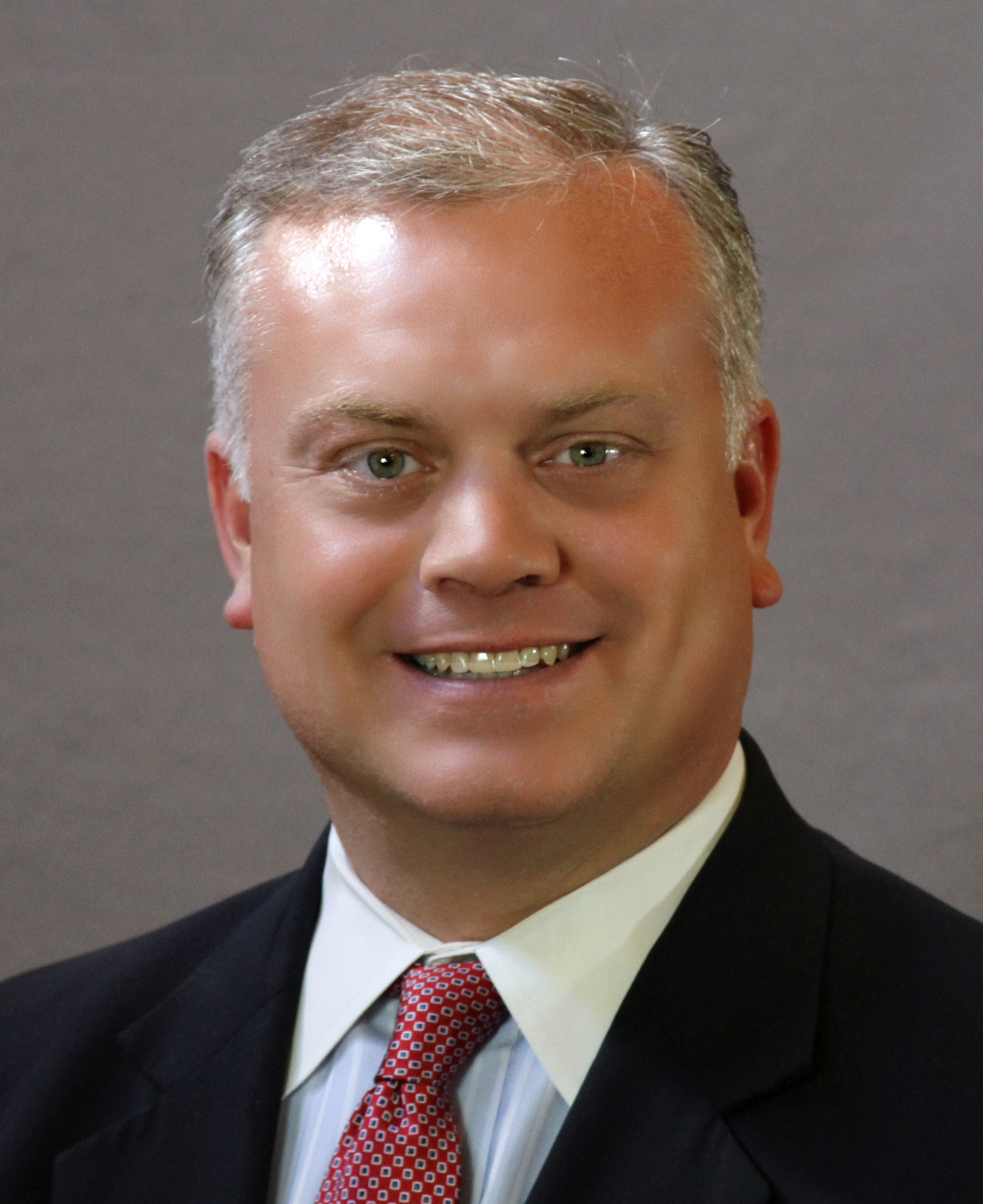

Member of the Georgia House of Representatives from the 67th district
- In office January 14, 2013 – January 9, 2023
- Preceded by: Bill Hembree
- Succeeded by: Kimberly New (Redistricting)

Personal details
- Born: May 12, 1974 (age 52) Douglasville, Georgia
- Party: Republican

Micah Thomas Gravley II (born May 12, 1974) is an American politician who served in the Georgia House of Representatives from the 67th district from 2013 to 2023. The Georgia Recorder noted that Gravley was a "key figure in promoting medical cannabis legalization" in the state.

Gravley did not seek a sixth term and left the Georgia House in 2023; Kimberly New (R) won election to the redistricted seat. Lydia Glaize won the new District 67.

Georgia House of Representatives
Preceded by Bill Hembree	Member of the Georgia House of Representatives from the 67th district 2013–2023	Succeeded by Lydia Glaize
