= Ford Spinks =

American politician (1927–2016)

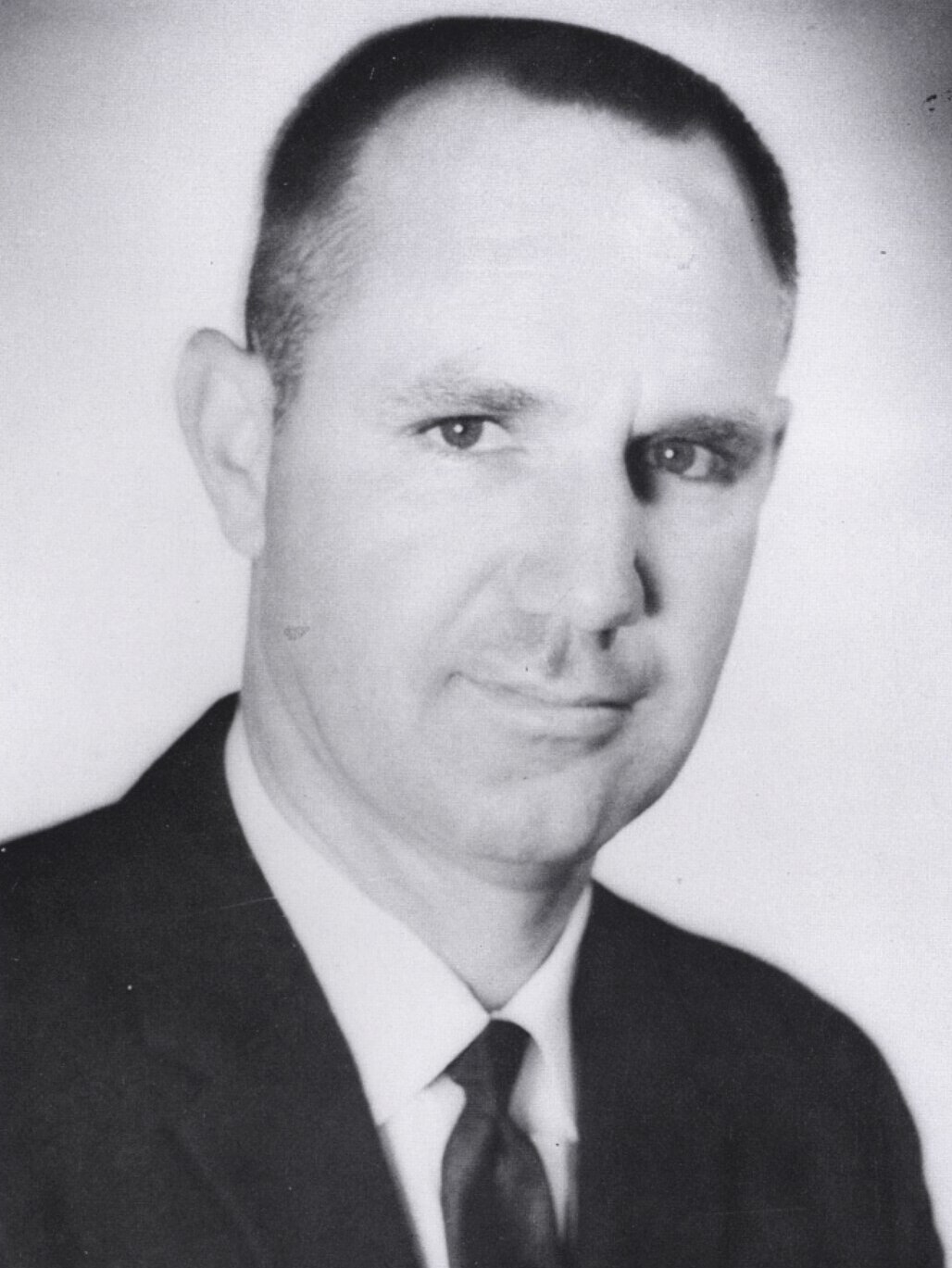
- Official portrait, 1970s

Member of the Georgia Public Service Commission
- In office 1971–1989
- Preceded by: Walter R. McDonald/ Alpha Alsbury Fowler Jr.
- Succeeded by: Robby Rowan

Member of the Georgia State Senate
- In office 1962–1971
- Succeeded by: Frank Sutton

Personal details
- Born: April 5, 1927 Tifton, Georgia, U.S.
- Died: July 27, 2016 (aged 89)
- Party: Democratic
- Spouse: Ruby Lee Pritchard (d. 2012)
- Occupation: Farm Equipment Dealer

Ford Belmont Spinks, Sr. (April 5, 1927 – July 27, 2016) was an American politician who was a Democratic member of the Georgia State Senate from 1962 to 1971. After his senate term, he was a public services commissioner of Georgia from 1971 to 1989. He was a farm equipment dealer.

Spinks died on July 27, 2016.
