= 1990 Georgia lieutenant gubernatorial election =

- November 6, 1990
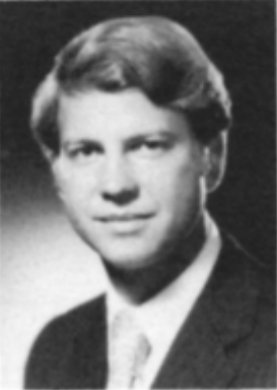

Nominee	Pierre Howard	Matt Towery
Party	Democratic	Republican
Popular vote	864,849	474,057
Percentage	62.70%	34.37%
- County results Howard: 40–50% 50–60% 60–70% 70–80% 80–90% Towery: 40–50% 50–60%
Lieutenant Governor before election
Zell Miller
Democratic
Elected Lieutenant Governor
Pierre Howard
Democratic

The 1990 Georgia lieutenant gubernatorial election was held on November 6, 1990, to elect the lieutenant governor of Georgia, concurrently with the 1990 gubernatorial election, as well as elections to the United States Senate and elections to the United States House of Representatives and various state and local elections. Georgia is one of 21 states that elects its lieutenant governor separately from its governor.

Incumbent Democratic lieutenant governor Zell Miller retired to run for governor. Democrats nominated State Senator Pierre Howard who defeated Republican nominee Matt Towery.

== Democratic primary ==
=== Candidates ===
==== Advanced to runoff ====
- Pierre Howard, State Senator from Decatur
- Joe Kennedy, State Senator from Claxton

==== Defeated in primary ====
- George Berry, State Commissioner of Industry, Trade, and Tourism, former Deputy Chief Administrative Officer for Mayor of Atlanta Ivan Allen Jr., former Chief Administrative Officer for Mayor of Atlanta Sam Massell, and former Atlanta Commissioner of Aviation
- Jim Pannell, State Representative from Savannah
- Frank I. Bailey, Jr., State Representative from Riverdale
- Lawrence 'Bud' Stumbaugh, State Senator from Stone Mountain
- J. B. Stoner, segregationist and perennial candidate
- Bobby L. Hill, former State Representative from Savannah
- James W. 'Jim' Goolsby

=== Results ===
Democratic primary results by county: Howard: Howard—20–30%; Howard—30–40%; Howard—40–50%; Howard—>50%; Kennedy: Kennedy—20–30%; Kennedy—30–40%; Kennedy—40–50%; Kennedy—50–60%; Kennedy—60–70%; Kennedy—70–80%; Kennedy—80–90%; Kennedy—>90%; Berry: Berry—30–40%; Berry—70–80%; Berry—>80%; Pannell: Pannell—20–30%; Pannell—30–40%; Pannell—50–60%; Pannell—>80%; Bailey: Bailey—30–40%; Goolsby: Goolsby—30–40%

Democratic primary results
Party	Candidate	Votes	%
Democratic	Pierre Howard	271,182	28.48
Democratic	Joe Kennedy	238,273	25.03
Democratic	George Berry	158,842	17.77
Democratic	Jim Pannell	76,374	8.02
Democratic	Frank I. Bailey, Jr.	69,625	7.31
Democratic	Lawrence 'Bud' Stumbaugh	46,132	4.85
Democratic	J. B. Stoner	30,804	3.24
Democratic	Bobby L. Hill	28,885	3.03
Democratic	James W. 'Jim' Goolsby	21,991	2.31
Total votes		952,108	100.0

==== Runoff Results ====
Democratic runoff results by county: Howard: Howard—50–60%; Howard—60–70%; Howard—>70%; Kennedy: Kennedy—50–60%; Kennedy—60–70%; Kennedy—70–80%; Kennedy—80–90%; Kennedy—>90%

Democratic primary runoff results
Party	Candidate	Votes	%
Democratic	Pierre Howard	561,105	60.89
Democratic	Joe Kennedy	360,467	39.11
Total votes		921,572	100.0

== Republican primary ==
=== Candidates ===
- Matt Towery
- Janice Horton, former Democratic State Senator from McDonough
- Ann Hall

=== Results ===
Republican primary results by county: Towery: Towery—30–40%; Towery—40–50%; Towery—50–60%; Towery—60–70%; Towery—70–80%; Towery—80–90%; Towery—90–100%; Horton: Horton—40–50%; Horton—50–60%; Horton—60–70%; Horton—70–80%; Horton—90–100%; Hall: Hall—50–60%; Hall—90–100%; Tie: Tie—30–40%; Tie—50%; No data: No data

Republican primary results
Party	Candidate	Votes	%
Republican	Matt Towery	64,731	61.41
Republican	Janice Horton	22,394	21.25
Republican	Ann Hall	18,278	17.34
Total votes		105,403	100.00

== General election ==
=== Results ===
1990 Georgia lieutenant gubernatorial election
Party	Candidate	Votes	%	±%
Democratic	Pierre Howard	864,849	62.70%	−37.29%
Republican	Matt Towery	474,057	34.37%	+34.37%
Libertarian	Walker Chandler	40,387	2.93%	+2.93%
Total votes		1,379,293	100.00%	N/A
Democratic hold				

== See also ==
- 1990 United States gubernatorial elections
- 1990 Georgia gubernatorial election
- 1990 United States Senate election in Georgia
- 1990 United States House of Representatives elections in Georgia
- State of Georgia
- Lieutenant Governors of Georgia
