= Clint Day =

American politician (born 1959)

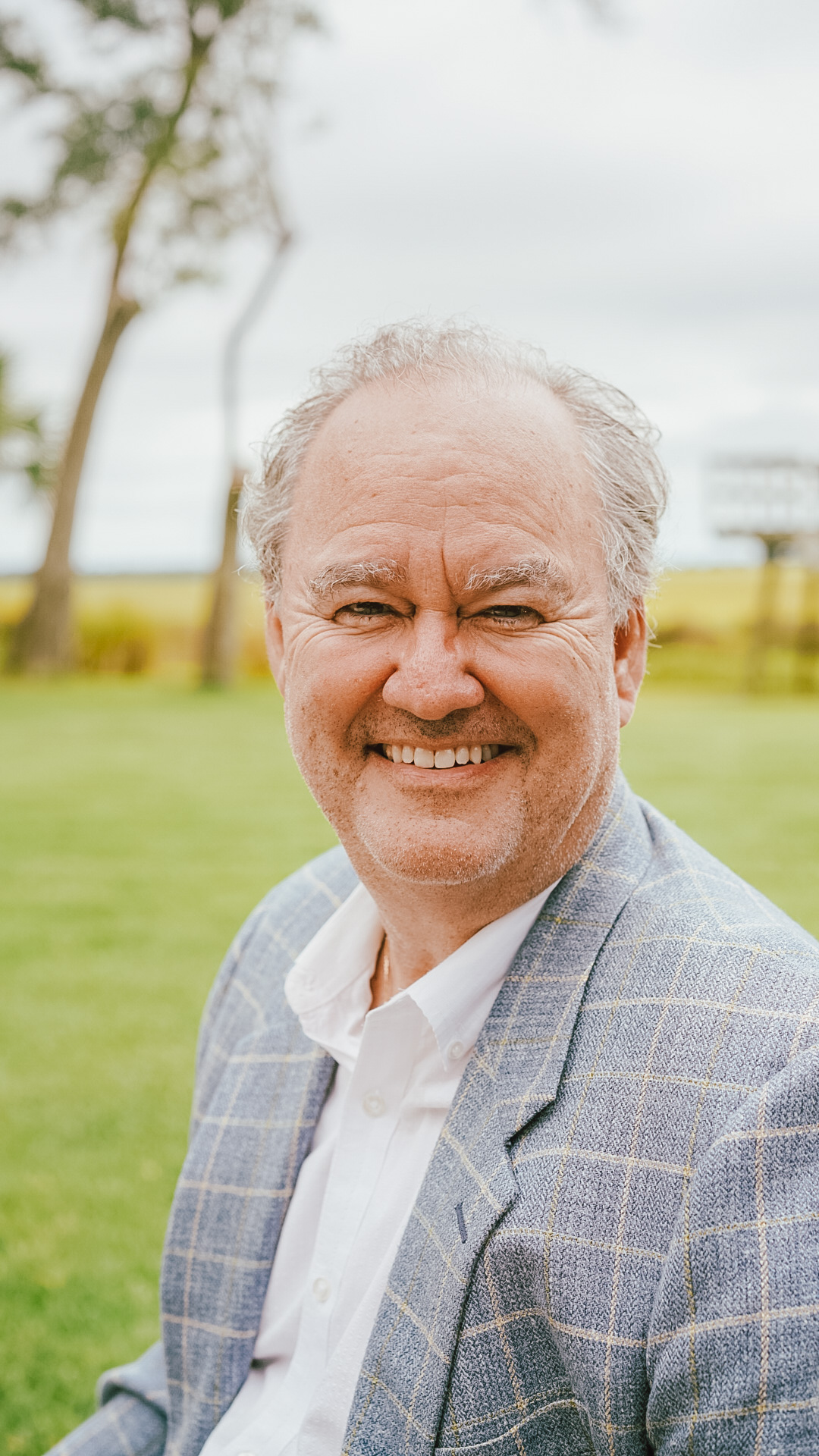

Clint M. Day (born January 28, 1959) is an American politician who served in the Georgia State Senate for District 48 from 1993 to 1997. He mounted unsuccessful campaigns for the U.S. Senate in 1996 and Lieutenant Governor in 1998, in which he lost the primary runoff election. He was considered a social and fiscal conservative Republican, and is not the insurance agent Clint Day, another Atlanta business owner.
