= Matt Towery =

American attorney, pollster, and politician

Member of the Georgia House of Representatives
- In office 1993–1997

Personal details
- Born: Matthew Allen Towery; December 6, 1959 (age 66) Atlanta, Georgia, U.S.
- Party: Republican
- Spouse: Dolle Towery
- Children: 2
- Education: University of Georgia; University of Cambridge; Stetson University College of Law
- Occupation: Political analyst and pollster, attorney, businessman

Matthew Allen "Matt" Towery (born December 6, 1959) is an American attorney, political analyst, pollster, author, and former Republican member of the Georgia House of Representatives. He served two terms in the state legislature from 1993 to 1997 and later became co-founder and chairman of InsiderAdvantage, a polling and media organization.

In late 2014, Towery encouraged Donald Trump to run for the US presidency, suggesting he would be a serious contender. His polls were among the few to call the 2016 presidential race for Trump over Democratic nominee Hillary Clinton.

== Education ==
Towery attended the University of Georgia, then earned a Master's in Philosophy from Cambridge. In 1987, he earned a Juris Doctor from Stetson University

== Career ==
Towery served in the Georgia House of Representatives and was the Republican nominee for Lieutenant Governor of Georgia in 1990. He served as Chairman of then-Speaker Newt Gingrich's political organization in the 1990s.

He has appeared on news networks and on The O'Reilly Factor and Hardball with Chris Matthews and with hosts Sean Hannity and Bill Maher. In 2011 he served as a weekly guest commentator for CNN. He has been a political analyst for the Fox affiliate in Atlanta.

In 2014, Towery predicted Donald Trump could become a serious contender for the U.S. presidency. His polling company was one of few to predict a Trump win over Clinton in 2016. Towery wrote a memo detailing the reasons he thought other pollsters were missing likely Trump voters, including over-representing Democrats and under-representing white men, and saying the other polls "were being weighted based on a conventional turnout in a very unconventional year and there is a ‘Trump vote’ that most pollsters just are not able to capture." Hannity read the memo on-air just before the election, which Trump won.

The day before the 2020 US presidential election, Towery again predicted a win for Donald Trump, saying he believed other pollsters were missing "the average guy on the street." He also predicted that Trump would carry Georgia by seven percent, but Joe Biden narrowly won the state.

As of 2020 he was Of Counsel with Hall, Booth, Smith in their Atlanta office.

== Personal life ==
Towery lives with his wife in Atlanta, Georgia and Snell Isle in St. Petersburg, Florida. He has two adult children.

Party political offices
Vacant Title last held by Frank Sutton	Republican nominee for Lieutenant Governor of Georgia; 1990	Succeeded by Nancy Schaefer
