= Jim Butterworth (politician) =

American politician

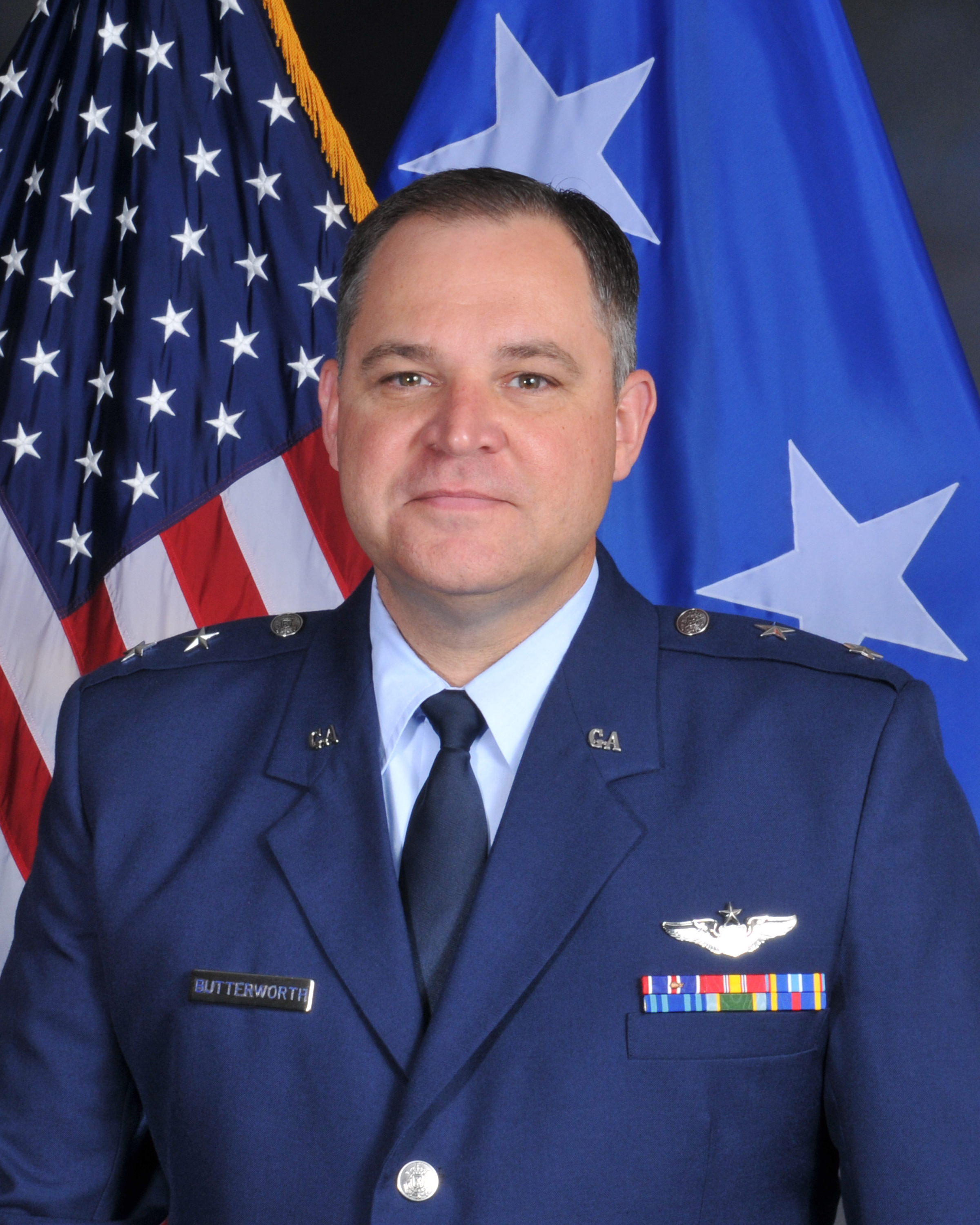
- Major General Jim B. Butterworth

Director of the Georgia Emergency Management Agency
- In office 2015–2016
- Governor: Nathan Deal
- Preceded by: Charley English
- Succeeded by: Homer Bryson

Adjutant General of Georgia
- In office 2011–2015
- Governor: Nathan Deal
- Preceded by: Terry Nesbitt
- Succeeded by: Joe Jarrard

Member of the Georgia Senate from the 50th district
- In office 2009–2011
- Preceded by: Nancy Schaefer
- Succeeded by: John Wilkinson

Member of the Habersham County Commission from the 1st district
- In office 2005–2009
- Succeeded by: Sonny James

Personal details
- Party: Republican
- Education: University of Georgia

Honorable Jim Butterworth is an American aviator, military officer, and former elected official. He has served as a Captain for Delta Air Lines and previously served as a B-1 Aircraft Commander and T-38 instructor pilot in the United States Air Force and Georgia Air National Guard. Butterworth later served in public office as a member of the Georgia State Senate, Chairman of the Habersham County Commission, Adjutant General of Georgia, and Director of the Georgia Emergency Management and Homeland Security Agency.

== Early life and education ==
Butterworth graduated from the University of Georgia in 1988 with a Bachelor of Science degree in political science. While attending Georgia, he participated in the Air Force Reserve Officer Training Corps (AFROTC).

== Aviation and military career ==
Butterworth served as an officer and pilot in the United States Air Force, the United States Air Force Reserve, and the Georgia Air National Guard. During his military aviation career, he served as a T-38 instructor pilot, a C-5 pilot in the Air Force Reserve, and later as a B-1 aircraft commander and flight lead in the Georgia Air National Guard.

In commercial aviation, Butterworth joined Delta Air Lines in 1999. He became a Boeing 757 and 767 captain and later served as a lead line check pilot. During his airline career, he also flew the MD-88, MD-90, LR-Jet, and BA-3100 aircraft and accumulated more than 10,000 flight hours as a Delta pilot.

== Political career ==
Butterworth served as chairman of the Habersham County Board of Commissioners from 2004 to 2008. He was elected to the Georgia State Senate in 2008 and represented the 50th district in northeast Georgia from 2009 until 2011.

During his Senate tenure, Butterworth served on several committees, including Chairman of Higher Education, Banking and Financial Institutions, and Chairman of State and Local Governmental Operations. He also served as an Administration Floor Leader for Governor Nathan Deal.

Butterworth participated in legislative efforts related to reform of Georgia’s HOPE Scholarship program during debates regarding the program’s long-term financial sustainability.

== Adjutant General of Georgia ==
In 2011, Governor Nathan Deal appointed Butterworth as Adjutant General of Georgia. In that role, he oversaw the Georgia Army National Guard, Georgia Air National Guard, Georgia State Defense Force, and the Georgia Department of Defense.

== Georgia Emergency Management and Homeland Security Agency ==
In January 2015, Governor Nathan Deal appointed Butterworth as director of the Georgia Emergency Management Agency/Homeland Security (GEMA/HS). He also served as Homeland Security Advisor for the State of Georgia. His responsibilities included statewide emergency preparedness, disaster response coordination, and management of the State Emergency Operations Center.
