= Pierre Howard =

American politician

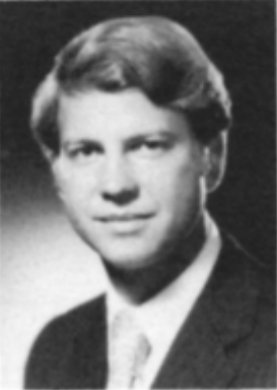

9th Lieutenant Governor of Georgia
- In office January 14, 1991 – January 11, 1999
- Governor: Zell Miller
- Preceded by: Zell Miller
- Succeeded by: Mark Taylor

Member of the Georgia Senate from the 42nd district
- In office January 1973 – January 1991
- Preceded by: Robert H. Walling
- Succeeded by: Cathey Steinberg

Personal details
- Born: Pierre DuVinage Howard Jr. February 3, 1943 (age 83)
- Party: Democratic
- Spouse: Nancy Barner (m. 1974)
- Children: 2
- Profession: Lawyer

Pierre DuVinage Howard, Jr. (born February 3, 1943) is an American politician. He served as the ninth Lieutenant Governor of the U.S. state of Georgia.

== Background ==
Howard was born into a political family, the son of Pierre DuVinage Howard (1912-1976) and Caroline Ridley Howard (1913-2013). His great-grandfather, Thomas Coke Howard, was a member of the Georgia House of Representatives. His grandfather, William S. Howard served in the Georgia House, as well as the U.S. House of Representatives. Howard attended the University of Georgia, where he was captain of the tennis team and president of Sigma Alpha Epsilon fraternity. He graduated Phi Beta Kappa and went on to receive a law degree from the University of Georgia. In 1974, Howard married Nancy Barnes. They have two children, Christopher and Caroline.

== State Senate ==
Howard entered politics in 1972. He was elected to the Georgia State Senate, representing DeKalb County's 42nd district. He was subsequently re-elected eight times, serving a total of 18 years, until 1990. During his tenure in the Senate, Howard served eight years as assistant floor leader for Governor George Busbee and 16 years as chairman of the Senate Human Resources Committee.

== Lieutenant governor ==
In 1990, Howard ran for the office of Lieutenant Governor. The metro Atlanta attorney targeted rural voters, with a campaign that reimaged the candidate with humor, stressing his "Southernness" with the slogan "Pierre is French for Bubba". In that race he defeated State Senator Joe Kennedy in the Democratic primary then subsequently beat Republican nominee Matt Towery.

Later, in March 2000 the two former political rivals formed InsiderAdvantage.com. Howard was elected to a four-year term and was re-elected in 1994 by defeating Nancy Schaefer. Howard focused on critical issues concerning Georgia families throughout his political career (i.e. graduated licenses and zero tolerance for drinking and driving for teens).

== Campaign for governor ==
In 1997, Howard announced his intention to run for governor. He was considered by many to be the front-runner for the Democratic nomination. However, prior to the primary election, after having raised over $1 million in campaign contributions, Howard abruptly exited the race, due to "family concerns". Campaign funds were returned to contributors.

== Honor ==
The Interstate 285 and Interstate 20 interchange in DeKalb County, Georgia is named in his honor.

Party political offices
Preceded by Zell Miller	Democratic nominee for Lieutenant Governor of Georgia; 1990, 1994	Succeeded by Mark Taylor
Political offices
Preceded by Zell Miller	Lieutenant Governor of Georgia; January 1991 – January 1999	Succeeded by Mark Taylor
Georgia State Senate
Preceded by Robert H. Walling	Georgia State Senator from 42nd district January 1973 – January 1991	Succeeded by Cathey Steinberg
