= Mark Taylor (American politician) =

American politician (born 1957)

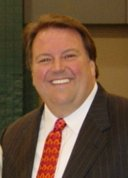
- Taylor in 2005

10th Lieutenant Governor of Georgia
- In office January 11, 1999 – January 8, 2007
- Governor: Roy Barnes; Sonny Perdue
- Preceded by: Pierre Howard
- Succeeded by: Casey Cagle

Member of the Georgia Senate from the 12th district
- In office May 1987 – January 1999
- Preceded by: Al Holloway
- Succeeded by: Mike von Bremen

Personal details
- Born: Mark Fletcher Taylor; May 7, 1957 (age 69) Albany, Georgia, U.S.
- Party: Democratic
- Spouse: Sacha Wilbanks
- Education: Emory University (BA); University of Georgia (JD)

Mark Fletcher Taylor (born May 7, 1957) is an American politician and member of the Democratic Party who served two terms between 1999 and 2007 as the 10th lieutenant governor of Georgia. Taylor was the Democratic nominee for governor of Georgia in 2006, losing in the general election to Republican incumbent Sonny Perdue.

== Early life and education ==
Taylor was born on May 7, 1957, in Albany, Georgia. He is a graduate of Deerfield-Windsor School in Albany. Taylor earned a bachelor's degree in political science from Emory University and received his Juris Doctor from the University of Georgia. At Emory, Taylor joined the Sigma Alpha Epsilon fraternity.

Taylor is married to the former Sacha Wilbanks of Lavonia, Georgia. Taylor has one adult son, Fletcher. Taylor is a member of the Porterfield Methodist Church in Albany.

== State Senate experience ==
During the administration of Governor Joe Frank Harris, Taylor was elected to the Georgia Senate. He won a special election on May 3, 1987, and succeeded to Democratic incumbent Al Holloway as the state senator representing the 12th district, which encompasses the city of Albany and Dougherty County. He won re-election in 1988, 1990, 1992, 1994 and 1996.

Taylor became floor leader under Harris' successor, Zell Miller. In that role, he marshalled bipartisan support for Miller's HOPE Scholarship program in 1993. Taylor also worked to help create the Peachcare program, which provides health care assistance to uninsured children of low income families.

During the early 1990s, Taylor made crime reduction a major priority. He secured passage of the "Victim's Bill of Rights" as well as the "Two Strikes" law, at the time the strictest anti-violent crime measure in the country. Taylor also successfully advocated for Georgia's first DNA database, which has now solved more than 300 previously unsolved crimes.

== As lieutenant governor ==
Taylor declined running for re-election as a state senator in 1998 to pursue a run for the office of Lieutenant Governor. He defeated Republican candidate Mitch Skandalakis and took office on January 11, 1999. He won re-election in 2002 over Republican nominee Steve Stancil and was sworn in for a second term on January 13, 2003.

== Gubernatorial candidacy ==
In 2005, Taylor announced his intention to seek the Democratic nomination for the office of Governor of Georgia, and officially announced his candidacy on April 18, 2006. He built his campaign around his record on education and health care issues, which he felt that incumbent Republican Sonny Perdue had not adequately addressed. Taylor was opposed by Georgia Secretary of State Cathy Cox and two other minor candidates in the Democratic primary election on July 18, 2006. Taylor garnered approximately 52 percent of the vote in the primary election, gaining him the right to oppose Governor Perdue in the 2006 Georgia gubernatorial election.

In the general election Perdue defeated Taylor, 57.94% to 38.22%.

=== Wikipedia controversy ===
On April 26, 2006, the Atlanta Journal-Constitution reported that a paragraph based on opposition research had been inserted into the Wikipedia article on Mark Taylor about the 2005 arrest of Taylor's son on charges of driving under the influence, causing an accident in which a passenger in his car was killed. According to the Associated Press, Internet entrepreneur and Wikipedia co-founder Jimmy Wales told reporters that the edit had been traced back to an IP registered to the Cox campaign, but said he had no way of knowing who made the change. After the story broke, Cox denied any knowledge of the alleged actions and said she had instructed her staff to not make the incident an issue. Her campaign manager, Morton Brilliant, resigned shortly thereafter.

== Career since 2006 ==
Taylor is chief executive officer of the Fred Taylor Company, an Albany transportation and warehousing firm, as well as several of its subsidiaries.

== See also ==
Georgia State Senate
Preceded by Al Holloway	Member of the Georgia State Senate from the 12th district 1987–1999	Succeeded by Mike von Bremen
Political offices
Preceded by Pierre Howard	Lieutenant Governor of Georgia; 1999–2007	Succeeded by Casey Cagle
Party political offices
Preceded by Pierre Howard	Democratic nominee for Lieutenant Governor of Georgia; 1998, 2002	Succeeded by Jim Martin
Preceded by Roy Barnes	Democratic nominee for Governor of Georgia; 2006	Succeeded by Roy Barnes
