= 127th Georgia General Assembly =

←	126th	128th	→
- Great Seal of the State of Georgia

Overview
- Legislative body: Georgia General Assembly
- Meeting place: Capitol Building - Atlanta

Senate
- Members: 54
- President of the Senate: Peter Zack Geer
- Party control: Democratic Party

House of Representatives
- Members: 205
- Speaker of the House: George T. Smith
- Party control: Democratic Party

Sessions
- 1st: January 14, 1963 – March 15, 1963
- 2nd: January 13, 1964 – February 21, 1964

Special sessions
- 1st: March 4, 1964 – June 25, 1965

The 127th Georgia General Assembly convened its first session on January 14, 1963, at the Georgia State Capitol in Atlanta. The 127th Georgia General Assembly succeeded the 126th and served as the precedent for the 128th in 1965.

Jimmy Carter was elected to serve his first of two terms in the Georgia State Senate this session.

== Members of the State Senate ==
District	Senator	Party	Residence
1	Frank O. Downing	Democratic	Savannah
2	William Searcey	Democratic	Savannah
3	Joseph Tribble	Republican	Savannah
4	Clinton Oliver	Democratic	Glenville
5	John M. Gayner, III	Democratic	Brunswick
6	William Zorn	Democratic	Jesup
7	Talmadge McKinnon	Democratic	Willacoochee
8	Robert Rowan	Democratic	Enigma
9	Ford Spinks	Democratic	Tifton
10	Glenn Pelham	Democratic	Cairo
11	Julian Webb	Democratic	Donalsonville
12	Al Holloway	Democratic	Albany
13	Martin Young	Democratic	Rebecca
14	Jimmy Carter	Democratic	Plains
15	A. Perry Gordy	Republican	Columbus
16	Harry Jackson	Republican	Columbus
17	Garland Byrd	Democratic	Reynolds
18	Stanley Smith	Democratic	Perry
19	Roy Noble	Democratic	Vienna
20	Hugh Gillis	Democratic	Soperton
21	Milton Carlton	Democratic	Swainsboro
22	J. B. Fuqua	Democratic	Augusta
23	Milford Scott	Democratic	Augusta
24	Wyck Knox	Independent	Thomson
25	Culver Kidd Jr.	Democratic	Milledgeville
26	William Hunt	Democratic	Macon
27	Taylor Phillips	Democratic	Macon
28	Robert H. Smalley Jr.	Democratic	Griffin
29	Roland Heard	Democratic	West Point
30	Lamar Plunkett	Democratic	Bowdon
31	Albert F. Moore	Democratic	Cedartown
32	Edward Kendrick	Democratic	Marietta
33	Kyle Yancey	Democratic	Austell
34	Charlie Brown	Democratic	Atlanta
35	Frank E. Coggin	Democratic	Hapeville
36	Joe Salome	Democratic	Atlanta
37	James Wesberry	Democratic	Atlanta
38	Leroy Johnson	Democratic	Atlanta
39	Oby Brewer	Democratic	Atlanta
40	Dan MacIntyre	Republican	Atlanta
41	McKinley Conway	Democratic	Atlanta
42	Ben F. Johnson	Democratic	Atlanta
43	William McWhorter	Democratic	Decatur
44	Thomas Ellis	Democratic	McDonough
45	Brooks Pennington	Democratic	Madison
46	Paul C. Broun Sr.	Democratic	Athens
47	Robert Lee	Democratic	Hartwell
48	Harold Harrison	Democratic	Bethlehem
49	Erwin Owens	Democratic	Dahlonega
50	Zell Miller	Democratic	Young Harris
51	Jack Fincher	Democratic	Canton
52	James Battle Hall	Democratic	Rome
53	Joseph Loggins	Democratic	Summerville
54	Charles Pannell (res.)	Democratic	Chatsworth
55	Reese Thomas	Republican	Dalton

== Members of the House ==
County	Representative	Party
Appling	Curtis Herndon	Democratic
Atkinson	Waldo Henderson	Democratic
Bacon	Hugh Deen	Democratic
Baker	J. R. Rhodes Jr.	Democratic
Baldwin	John Floyd Harrington	Democratic
Baldwin	Phillip Chandler	Democratic
Banks	John Simmons	Democratic
Barrow	James Paris	Democratic
Bartow	William Greene	Democratic
Bartow	J.R. Cullens	Democratic
Ben Hill	Arthur Dorminy	Democratic
Berrien	William Knight	Democratic
Bibb	Denmark Groover Jr.	Democratic
Bibb	Michael House	Democratic
Bibb	William Laite	Democratic
Bleckley	James Mullis	Democratic
Brantley	Hoke Wilson	Democratic
Brooks	Henry Reaves	Democratic
Bryan	Jack Shuman	Democratic
Bulloch	W. Jones Lane	Democratic
Bulloch	Paul Nessmith	Democratic
Burke	Memory Tucker	Democratic
Butts	Bailey Woodward	Democratic
Calhoun	William Jordan	Democratic
Camden	Nolan Wells	Democratic
Camden	Charles Smith	Democratic
Candler	Hines Brantley	Democratic
Carroll	Joseph Elvin	Democratic
Carroll	Hayne Waldrop (res.)	Democratic
Carroll	William Wiggins	Democratic
Catoosa	Joe Tucker	Democratic
Charlton	Henry Rodgers	Democratic
Chatham	Willis Richardson	Democratic
Chatham	Arthur Funk	Democratic
Chatham	Bart Shea	Democratic
Chattahoochee	Joseph King (dcd.)	Democratic
Chattahoochee	Floyd Hudgins	Democratic
Chattooga	James Floyd	Democratic
Cherokee	Grady Coker	Democratic
Cherokee	Marion Pope	Democratic
Clarke	Chappelle Matthews	Democratic
Clarke	William Bedgood	Democratic
Clay	Henry McKemie	Democratic
Clayton	Edgar Blalock	Democratic
Clayton	Bill Lee	Democratic
Clinch	Grover Lee	Democratic
Cobb	Elmer Teague	Democratic
Cobb	Robert Flournoy	Democratic
Cobb	Joe Wilson	Democratic
Coffee	George Williams	Democratic
Coffee	Henry Milhollin	Democratic
Colquitt	Dorsey Matthews	Democratic
Colquitt	David Newton	Democratic
Columbia	G.S. Phillips	Democratic
Cook	Wilson Wilkes	Democratic
Coweta	Henry Payton	Democratic
Coweta	D.B. Blalock	Democratic
Crawford	John Scarborough Jr.	Democratic
Crisp	Howard H. Rainey	Democratic
Dade	Maddox Hale	Democratic
Dawson	Ralph W. Bowen	Democratic
Decatur	J. Willis Conger	Democratic
Decatur	Robert Griffin	Democratic
DeKalb	James MacKay	Democratic
DeKalb	Guy Rutland	Democratic
DeKalb	J. Robin Harris	Democratic
Dodge	Williamson Stuckey	Democratic
Dooly	Thomas I. Sangster	Democratic
Dougherty	George Busbee	Democratic
Dougherty	Colquitt Odom	Democratic
Dougherty	William Lee	Democratic
Douglas	Alpha Fowler	Democratic
Early	Leon Baughman	Democratic
Echols	Louis Raulerson	Democratic
Effingham	B. Frank Arnsdorff	Democratic
Elbert	A.S. Johnson	Democratic
Emanuel	Geo Smith	Democratic
Evans	G. Ed Perry	Democratic
Fannin	A.C. Duncan	Republican
Fayette	A. Hewlette Herrel	Democratic
Floyd	Sidney Lowrey	Democratic
Floyd	J.E. Jordan	Democratic
Forsyth	A.C. Smith	Democratic
Franklin	C. Patrick Milford	Democratic
Fulton	Wilson Brooks	Democratic
Fulton	Jack Etheridge	Democratic
Fulton	Ralph McClelland	Democratic
Gilmer	B.C. Logan	Republican
Glascock	W.G. Todd	Democratic
Glynn	William R. Killian	Democratic
Glynn	Joe Isenberg	Democratic
Gordon	Troy Causby	Democratic
Grady	George T. Smith	Democratic
Greene	Allen P. Roper	Democratic
Gwinnett	Handsell Morgan	Democratic
Habersham	Richard Russel Smith	Democratic
Hall	W.M. Williams	Democratic
Hall	Howard Overby	Democratic
Hancock	Marvin E. Moate	Democratic
Haralson	Tom Murphy	Democratic
Harris	William Steis	Democratic
Hart	M. Parks Brown	Democratic
Heard	Truitt Davis	Democratic
Henry	Edward McGarity (res.)	Democratic
Henry	Ray Tucker	Democratic
Houston	David Peterson	Democratic
Houston	Paul Stalnaker	Democratic
Irwin	Harry Mixon	Democratic
Jackson	Mac Barber	Democratic
Jasper	Roy R. Kelly	Democratic
Jeff Davis	James L. Conner	Democratic
Jefferson	Roy McCracken	Democratic
Jenkins	A. Sid Newton	Democratic
Johnson	Emory Rowland	Democratic
Jones	Corbin Roberts	Democratic
Lamar	Haygood Keadle	Democratic
Lanier	Robert Pafford	Democratic
Laurens	D.W. Knight	Democratic
Laurens	WM. Malcolm Towson	Democratic
Lee	H. Goodwin Hall	Democratic
Liberty	Charles M. Jones	Democratic
Lincoln	Henry F. Partridge	Democratic
Long	J. Tyron Shaw	Democratic
Lowndes	W.J. Gibbons	Democratic
Lowndes	Fred H. Walker	Democratic
Lumpkin	Fred Jones Jr.	Democratic
Macon	J. Paul Sinclair	Democratic
Madison	Edwin Poss	Democratic
Marion	Eldridge W. Perry	Democratic
McDuffie	Leonard Lokey	Democratic
McIntosh	Daniel H. White	Democratic
Meriwether	Render Hill	Democratic
Miller	Buck Tabb	Democratic
Mitchell	Frank Twitty	Democratic
Monroe	Harold G. Clarke	Democratic
Montgomery	Joe Underwood	Democratic
Morgan	E. Roy Lambert	Democratic
Murray	Gerald Leonard	Democratic
Muscogee	Harry Dicus	Democratic
Muscogee	Milton Jones	Democratic
Muscogee	Mac Pickard	Democratic
Newton	William Ballard	Democratic
Newton	Jack H. Morgan	Democratic
Oconee	Hubert Wells	Democratic
Oglethorpe	George B. Brooks	Democratic
Paulding	George Bagby	Democratic
Peach	D. Warner Wells	Democratic
Pickens	Will Poole	Democratic
Pierce	Francis Houston	Democratic
Pike	Caleb Watson	Democratic
Polk	John Harvey Moore	Democratic
Polk	Nathan Dean	Democratic
Pulaski	John Anderson Jr.	Democratic
Putnam	Nevils Horton Jr.	Democratic
Quitman	Joe Hurst	Democratic
Rabun	Knox Bynum	Democratic
Randolph	A'Delbert Bowen	Democratic
Richmond	William Fleming	Democratic
Richmond	James Hull Jr	Democratic
Richmond	John Chapman Bell	Democratic
Rockdale	Clarence R. Vaughn Jr.	Democratic
Schley	Martin Eugene DeVane	Democratic
Screven	Henry Walstein Parker	Democratic
Seminole	J.O. Brackin	Democratic
Spalding	Arthur Key Bolton	Democratic
Spalding	Quimby Melton Jr.	Democratic
Stephens	James Allen Andrews	Democratic
Stewart	Sam S. Singer	Democratic
Sumter	William Blair	Democratic
Sumter	John William Sewell	Democratic
Sumter	Jesse Watts	Democratic
Taliferro	Wales Flynt	Democratic
Tatnall	Hogan Kirkland	Democratic
Taylor	Ralph Underwood	Democratic
Telfair	Edgar Smith Jr	Democratic
Terrell	Ed Fulford	Democratic
Thomas	James Keyton	Democratic
Thomas	Henry Russell Jr	Democratic
Tift	W. Frank Branch	Democratic
Tift	Henry Banks Allen	Democratic
Toombs	Ross Bowen	Democratic
Towns	John Acree	Democratic
Treutlen	J. Wyman Fowler	Democratic
Troup	James Crawford Ware	Democratic
Troup	Harry Spikes	Democratic
Turner	Roy Coker	Democratic
Twiggs	Homer Chance	Democratic
Twiggs	James Beck	Democratic
Union	William Meeks Jr	Democratic
Upson	Johnnie L. Caldwell	Democratic
Walker	William Shaw Abney	Democratic
Walker	Wayne Snow Jr.	Democratic
Walton	John Byrd	Democratic
Ware	William Ponsell	Democratic
Ware	Harry D. Dixon	Democratic
Ware	Bobby Ware Johnson	Democratic
Washington	Thomas Carr	Democratic
Wayne	James E. Warren	Democratic
Webster	James Black	Democratic
Wheeler	Mackie Simpson	Democratic
White	Thomas McDonald Jr.	Democratic
Whitfield	Virgil Smith	Democratic
Whitfield	Thomas Marvin Mitchell	Democratic
Wilcox	Cecil Crummey (dcd.)	Democratic
Wilcox	Joe Dennard	Democratic
Wilkes	William Lindsey (dcd.)	Democratic
Wilkes	John G. Wright	Democratic
Wilkinson	E. Brooks Lewis	Democratic
Worth	David Campbell Jones	Democratic

== See also ==
- List of Georgia state legislatures
