= 1962 Georgia State Senate election =

1962 Georgia Senate election
- November 6, 1962

All 54 seats in the Georgia State Senate 28 seats needed for a majority
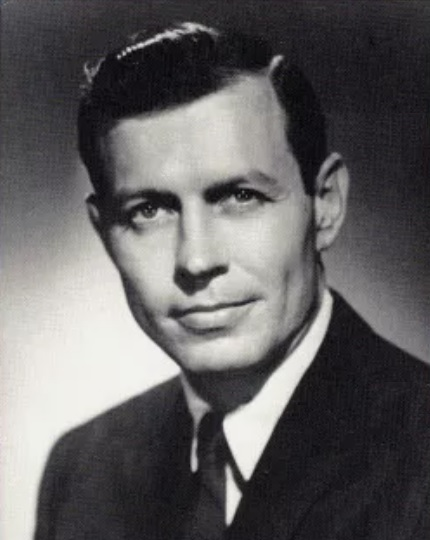

	Majority party	Minority party
Leader	Carl Sanders (retired)	None
Party	Democratic	Republican
Leader since	February 20, 1959
Leader's seat	18th–Richmond (Note: Had Sanders ran again, his home county of Richmond would have been in the 22nd district)
Last election	54 seats, 100%
Seats won	50	2
Seats after	51	2
Popular vote	86,043 (Note: Popular vote totals based on partial unofficial returns from contested districts)	55,223
	Third party
Party	Write-in
Seats won	1
Seats after	0 (Note: Jimmy Carter, elected as a write-in candidate from District 14, served as a Democrat.)
Popular vote	5,195
- Results by winning party Democratic hold Write-in Democratic gain Republican gain Result voided
President pro tempore before election
Carl Sanders
Democratic
Elected President pro tempore
Harry C. Jackson
Democratic

Georgia Senate districts till October 1962

Elections to the Georgia State Senate were held on November 6, 1962, to elect 54 candidates to serve a two-year term in the 127th Georgia General Assembly. The Democratic primary was held on September 12, though some counties held primaries earlier. A last-minute special session with the aim to reapportion the legislature began on September 27, 1962, and a new plan was passed by the Senate on October 5, in a 43 to 4 vote. For decades, the Senate had been malapportioned in a manner which heavily favored rural counties, but the new plan gave many new Senate seats to densely-populated urban areas. The new apportionment plan completely invalidated all nominations already made, and special Democratic primary elections were scheduled for October 16, with runoffs on October 23.

Despite being split up into districts, all counties with more than one seat planned to elect all of their senators in a county-wide vote, although each candidate was required to reside in their district. This was to prevent majority-Black districts, specifically Fulton County's 38th, from electing a Black senator, as White voters from the rest of Fulton County would water down the Black vote, despite winning a majority in their own district. In a suit brought up by state senate candidate George Finch, Fulton Superior Judge Durwood Pye ruled this plan unconstitutional specifically in Fulton County on October 15, 1962. While this ruling only applied to Fulton County's special primary runoff and general election, and not the six other counties that elected their senators county-wide, it directly resulted in the election of the first Black state senator in 88 years, Democrat Leroy R. Johnson of Atlanta.

Democrats retained near-total control of the chamber. Two Republicans, A. Perry Gordy of Muscogee County and Dan MacIntyre of Fulton County were elected to the chamber, alongside future Democratic Governor and U.S. President Jimmy Carter of the 14th district, who was elected on a write-in ballot.

== General election results ==
The following candidates were returned by the state's 54 Senate districts:

- District 1: Frank O. Downing (D)
- District 2: William A. Searcey (D)
- District 3: Did not return a candidate after Harris Slotin's (D) victory was vacated after he was found to not reside in the district. Slotin had initially defeated Joseph Tribble (R), 11,741 votes (50.62%) to 11,455 (49.38%). The seat was filled in a February 15 special election by Tribble, who was elected with 14,127 votes (42.43%) over three Democratic candidates, Eugene H. Gadsden, who received 8,096 (24.32%), Spence Grayson, who received 6,628 (19.91%), and John Baker, who received 4,441 (13.34%).
- District 4: Clinton Oliver (D)
- District 5: John M. Gayner (D)
- District 6: William A. Zorn (D)
- District 7: Talmadge McKinnion (D)
- District 8: Robert A. Rowan (D)
- District 9: Ford Spinks (D)
- District 10: Glenn Pelham (D)
- District 11: Julian Webb (D)
- District 12: A. L. Holloway (D)
- District 13: Martin Young (D)
- District 14: Jimmy Carter (D) was elected over Homer Moore (D), 3,013 votes (58.00%) to 2,182 (42.00%). No candidate appeared on the ballot for this election and both ran as write-in candidates after a court injunction voided the special Democratic primary over allegations of voter fraud.
- District 15: A. Perry Gordy (R) was elected over William Wickham (D), 4,628 votes (50.11%) to 4,608 (49.89%).
- District 16: Harry C. Jackson (D)
- District 17: Garland T. Byrd (D)
- District 18: Stanley E. Smith (D)
- District 19: Roy Noble (D)
- District 20: Hugh Gillis (D)
- District 21: Milton A. Carlton (D)
- District 22: J. B. Fuqua (D)
- District 23: Milford A. Scott (D)
- District 24: Wyck Knox (D)
- District 25: Culver Kidd Jr. (D)
- District 26: William J. Hunt (D) was elected over James O. Jackson (R), 8,254 votes (66.00%) to 4,253 (34.00%).
- District 27: J. Taylor Phillips (D)
- District 28: Robert H. Smalley Jr. (D)
- District 29: R. Shaefer Heard (D)
- District 30: Lamar Plunkett (D)
- District 31: Albert F. Moore (D)
- District 32: Edward S. Kendrick (D)
- District 33: Kyle Yancey (D)
- District 34: Charlie Brown (D)
- District 35: Frank E. Coggin (D)
- District 36: Joe Salome (D)
- District 37: James P. Wesberry (D) was elected over George C. Lunquist (R), 6,542 votes (71.07%) to 2,663 (28.93%).
- District 38: Leroy R. Johnson (D) was elected over T. M. Alexander (R), 7,372 votes (69.14%) to 3,291 (30.86%). Johnson was the first Black state legislator elected to the state senate since 1874, though both candidates were Black.
- District 39: Oby Brewer Sr. (D) was elected over Rod Harris (R), 5,533 votes (66.85%) to 2,744 (33.15%).
- District 40: Dan MacIntyre (R) was elected over Hamilton Lokey (D), 8,976 votes (51.16%) to 8,568 (48.84%).
- District 41: McKinley Conway (D) was elected over Earl J. Roberts (R), 4,801 votes (60.80%) to 3,095 (39.20%).
- District 42: Ben F. Johnson (D) was elected over Robert Fine (R), 8,711 votes (65.11%) to 4,667 (34.89%).
- District 43: Hugh McWhorter (D)
- District 44: S. Tom Ellis (D) was elected over H. J. Petite (R) according to incomplete vote totals, 1,428 votes (72.19%) to 550 votes (27.81%).
- District 45: Brooks Pennington Jr. (D)
- District 46: Paul C. Broun (D) was elected over Guy B. Scott Jr. (R), 4,407 votes (78.63%) to 1,198 (21.37%).
- District 47: Robert E. Lee Jr. (D)
- District 48: Harold Harison (D)
- District 49: Erwin Owens (D)
- District 50: Zell Miller (D) was elected over Zel Miller (R), 9,805 votes (62.09%) to 5,986 (37.91%).
- District 51: Jack Flincher (D)
- District 52: J. Battle Hall (D)
- District 53: Joseph E. Loggins (D)
- District 54: Charles Pannell (D) was elected over Harold Mann (R), 4,273 votes (71.34%) to 1,717 (28.66%).

== See also ==
- 1962 Georgia gubernatorial election
- 1962 United States Senate election in Georgia
