= 126th Georgia General Assembly =

| ← | 126th | 128th | → |
- Great Seal of the State of Georgia

Overview
- Legislative body: Georgia General Assembly
- Meeting place: Capitol Building - Atlanta

Senate
- Members: 54
- President of the Senate: Garland T. Byrd
- Party control: Democratic Party

House of Representatives
- Members: 205
- Speaker of the House: George L. Smith
- Party control: Democratic Party

Sessions
- 1st: 1961 – 1961
- 2nd: 1962 – 1962

The 126th Georgia General Assembly convened its first session in January 1963, at the Georgia State Capitol in Atlanta. The members were elected in the 1960 Georgia Senate and Georgia House elections. It was the last all-white General Assembly in member composition.

== Members of the Senate ==
| District | Senator | Party | Residence |
|---|---|---|---|
| 1 | Spence Grayson | Democratic | Savannah |
| 2 | Charles Warnell | | Pembroke |
| 3 | W. C. Long | | Nahunta |
| 4 | Oscar E. Raynor | | Folkston |
| 5 | W. K. Ponsell | | Waycross |
| 6 | Dan J. DeLoach | | Statenville |
| 7 | J. Roland Clanton | | Thomasville |
| 8 | J. Willis Conger | | Bainbridge |
| 9 | Charles E. Dows | | Edison |
| 10 | Jack Bell | | Leesburg |
| 11 | J. T. Dailey | | Cuthbert |
| 12 | Robert McKenzie | | Georgetown |
| 13 | John Thomas McKenzie | | Montezuma |
| 14 | James M. Dykes | | Cochran |
| 15 | John C. Peterson | | Ailey |
| 16 | William Malcolm Towson | | Dublin |
| 17 | A. Sid Newton | | Millen |
| 18 | Carl Sanders | | Augusta |
| 19 | W. Tom Veazey | | Warrenton |
| 20 | Floyd Harrington | | Milledgeville |
| 21 | J. W. Claxton | | Wrightsville |
| 22 | Robert Ogden Persons Sr | | Forsyth |
| 23 | W. T. Jones | | Roberta |
| 24 | Harry C. Jackson | | Columbus |
| 25 | Elisha Mullins Whisnant | | Hamilton |
| 26 | Robert H. Smalley Jr. | | Griffin |
| 27 | Talmadge Harden | | Commerce |
| 28 | E. R. Lambert | | Madison |
| 29 | Edgar D. Clary Jr | | Harlem |
| 30 | A. F. Seagraves | | Hull |
| 31 | C. L. Ayers | | Toccoa |
| 32 | Erwin Owens | | Dahlonega |
| 33 | Howard Overby | | Gainesville |
| 34 | W. Hugh McWhorter | | Decatur |
| 35 | Eugene Kelly | | Monroe |
| 36 | D. B. Blalock | | Newnan |
| 37 | Earl Staples | | Carrollton |
| 38 | Samuel U. Braly | | Dallas |
| 39 | J. L. White | | Douglasville |
| 40 | Zell Miller | | Young Harris |
| 41 | Charles Emerson Waters | | Ellijay |
| 42 | William Ingram | | Cartersville |
| 43 | Erwin Mitchell | | Dalton |
| 44 | Gaston V. Green | | Rising Fawn |
| 45 | Otto Griner | | Ocilla |
| 46 | O. D. Johnson | | Blackshear |
| 47 | Sam J. Gardner Jr. | | Moultrie |
| 48 | Elden Mathews | | Cordele |
| 49 | Ed Perry | | Claxton |
| 50 | Hamilton McWhorter Jr | | Lexington |
| 51 | Mark Fitzpatrick | | Jeffersonville |
| 52 | Charlie Brown | | Atlanta |
| 53 | Dan Hart | | Quitman |
| 54 | Gordon Knox | | Hazlehurst |

== See also ==
- List of Georgia state legislatures
