= Senator Gillis =

Senator Gillis may refer to:

- Hugh Gillis (1918–2013), Georgia State Senate
- James Lisle Gillis (1792–1881), Pennsylvania State Senate
- Jim L. Gillis Jr. (1916–2018), Georgia State Senate
- Neil L. Gillis (1864–1933), Georgia State Senate
