= 2013 Atlanta mayoral election =

- November 5, 2013
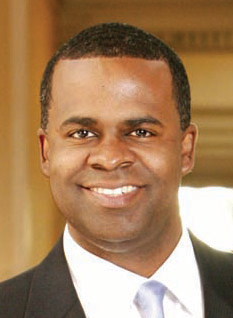

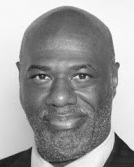
Candidate	Kasim Reed	Al Bartell
Party	Nonpartisan	Nonpartisan
Popular vote	40,157	2,550
Percentage	84.11%	5.34%
Mayor before election
Kasim Reed
Democratic
Elected mayor
Kasim Reed
Democratic

The 2013 mayoral election in Atlanta, Georgia, took place on November 5, 2013, alongside other Atlanta municipal races. Incumbent Mayor Kasim Reed faced no serious opposition and was re-elected with 84% of the vote. He was sworn in for his second term on January 6, 2014.

== Candidates ==
- Al Bartell, Green Party Candidate
- Fraser Duke, financial planner
- Kasim Reed, incumbent Mayor first elected in 2009
- Glenn Wrightson, consultant and candidate for 2005

== Results ==
Atlanta Mayoral election, 2013
Party	Candidate	Votes	%
Nonpartisan	Kasim Reed	40,157	84.11
Nonpartisan	Al Bartell	2,550	5.34
Nonpartisan	Glenn Wrightson	2,342	4.91
Nonpartisan	Fraser Duke	2,117	4.43
Nonpartisan	Write-In Votes	576	1.21
Total votes		47,742	100
