= Arthur Langford Jr. =

American politician

Member of the Georgia State Senate District 35
- In office 1984 – April 15, 1994
- Preceded by: Frank E. Coggin
- Succeeded by: Donzella James

Member of the Atlanta City Council District 9
- In office January 7, 1974 – 1982
- Preceded by: Position established
- Succeeded by: Archie Byron

Personal details
- Born: Arthur Edward Langford Jr. October 3, 1949
- Died: April 15, 1994 (aged 44)
- Party: Democratic
- Education: Morris Brown College

Arthur E. Langford Jr. (October 3, 1949 – April 15, 1994) was a Baptist minister, city councilor, and state senator (1984–1994) representing Atlanta, Georgia. He was a Democrat.

When he was a student at Morris Brown College, Langford worked against drugs and violence in poor neighborhoods, founding the United Youth Adult Conference. Langford was an ordained Baptist minister who served at West Hunter Street Baptist Church as associate minister and Rush Memorial Congregational Church as pastor.

== Memorials ==
In 1995, the Lakewood Freeway was renamed the Arthur Langford Jr. Memorial Parkway in honor of Langford. There is an Arthur Langford Park and a street, Arthur Langford Jr. Place in his old neighborhood, Joyland, in southeastern Atlanta. The United Youth Adult Conference II maintains the Arthur Langford Jr. Teen Leadership Institute.

== Family ==
Sarah-Elizabeth Langford is his daughter.
