= Senator Smalley =

Senator Smalley may refer to:

- David Allen Smalley (1809–1877), Vermont State Senate
- Jason Smalley (born 1981), Oklahoma State Senate
- Robert H. Smalley Jr. (1929–2003), Georgia State Senate
