= Atlanta's 9th City Council district =

Atlanta's 9th City Council district is one of the twelve geographic districts in the Atlanta City Council. It is represented by Dustin Hillis since 2018, who was elected in the 2017 Atlanta City Council election to succeed Felicia Moore.

The district was created in 1973 after a new city charter was passed, which replaced the former at-large six-member Board of Aldermen with a 15-member City Council of 12 districts and 6 (later 3) at-large posts. A previous Ninth Ward existed in various forms from 1854 to 1954.

== List of aldermen ==
=== 1935 ===
==== Aldermen ====
- Lester Hardy

==== Councilmembers ====
- Dean Callaway

== List of councilmembers ==
- Arthur Langford Jr. (January 7, 1974 – 1982)
- Archie Byron (1982–1990)
- Jared Samples (1990 – January 5, 1998)
- Felicia Moore (January 5, 1998 – January 2, 2018)
- Dustin R. Hillis (January 2, 2018 – present)
