= Mike Hodges (politician) =

American politician

Member of the Georgia State Senate from the 3rd district
- Incumbent
- Assumed office January 9, 2023
- Preceded by: Sheila McNeill

Personal details
- Party: Republican
- Spouse: Dana Hodges
- Children: 2
- Education: Brunswick Junior College; University of Georgia (BBA)
- Occupation: Politician

Michael D. Hodges is an American politician who is currently serving as the Georgia State Senator for the 3rd district.

== Education ==
Born in Glynn County, Hodges attended Brunswick High School and graduated in 1971. He then attended Brunswick Junior College and earned a BBA in banking and finance at the University of Georgia.

== Career ==
Hodges was a founding director of the First Bank of Brunswick, and later its CEO. The bank was purchased by Ameris Bancorp in 2001.

Hodges announced his run for the Georgia State Senate in February 2022.

In January 2024, Hodges co-sponsored S.B. 390, which would withhold government funding for any libraries in Georgia affiliated with the American Library Association.

== Elections ==
Hodges' state Senate bid was endorsed by the Georgia Chamber of Commerce.

=== Primary and general elections, 2022 ===
The primary election for District 3 was held on May 24, 2022. The two other candidates were Nora Lott Haynes and Jeff Jones.

Primary election results for Georgia State Senate district 3, 2022
| Party | Candidate | Votes | % |
|---|---|---|---|
| Republican | Nora Lott Haynes | 5,010 | 19.06 |
| Republican | Mike Hodges | 12,271 | 46.68 |
| Republican | Jeff Jones | 9,006 | 34.26 |
| Total votes | | 26,287 | 100.00 |

After no candidate won over 50% of the primary vote, a runoff between Hodges and Jeff Jones was held on June 21, 2022.

Primary runoff election results for Georgia State Senate district 3, 2022
| Party | Candidate | Votes | % |
|---|---|---|---|
| Republican | Mike Hodges | 7,259 | 67.33 |
| Republican | Jeff Jones | 3,523 | 32.67 |
| Total votes | | 10,782 | 100.00 |

In the general election, held on November 8, 2022, Hodges was unopposed.

General election results for Georgia State Senate district 3, 2022
| Party | Candidate | Votes | % |
|---|---|---|---|
| Republican | Mike Hodges | 54,807 | 100.00 |
| Total votes | | 54,807 | 100.00 |
| Republican hold | | | |

== Personal life ==
Hodges and his wife Dana have been married since the mid-1980s. They have two sons.
