= Sarah-Elizabeth Langford =

American beauty pageant contestant

- Born: September 28, 1981 (age 45); Atlanta, Georgia
- Education: University of Michigan
- Title: former First Lady of the City of Atlanta (2014-2018); Miss District of Columbia USA 2005; Miss District of Columbia 2002
- Spouse: Kasim Reed divorced 2019

Sarah-Elizabeth Langford (born September 28, 1981) is the former first lady of Atlanta and a former beauty pageant titleholder. Langford was the wife of the 59th Mayor of Atlanta, Kasim Reed. She is a member of Alpha Kappa Alpha sorority. She competed in the Miss America pageant in 2002 and the Miss USA pageant in 2005.

== Personal life ==
Langford is a native of Atlanta. Her late father, Arthur Langford Jr., was a minister and a Georgia State Senator and her mother an attorney and prominent community leader. Both her father and husband have held the same District 35 State Senate seat.

Langford attended Pace Academy where she attended kindergarten through 12th grade. She then graduated from the University of Michigan with a degree in French and received her J.D. from Howard University School of Law. While in law school, she worked for United States Congressman John Lewis. After graduating she worked for the D.C. Office of General Counsel for five years and later as an affordable housing developer for National Church Residences for eight years. As of 2014, Langford was the Executive Director of the Development Authority of Fulton County. In February 2017, Governor Nathan Deal appointed her to the Georgia Board of Regents. She is an advocate for the arts and serves on boards including the Atlanta Children's Museum and the nonprofit BIH.

Langford held the Miss District of Columbia 2002 and Miss District of Columbia USA 2005 titles and competed at Miss America 2003 and Miss USA 2005. She also won $50,000 on the NBC hit show Fear Factor, a promotional appearance for Miss USA.

Langford is believed to have married Kasim Reed in 2014, while he was serving his second term as Atlanta's mayor, before their baby was born in May/June. The Mayor's office announced their marriage and the birth of their daughter.
