= Kasim Reed =

American politician (born 1969)

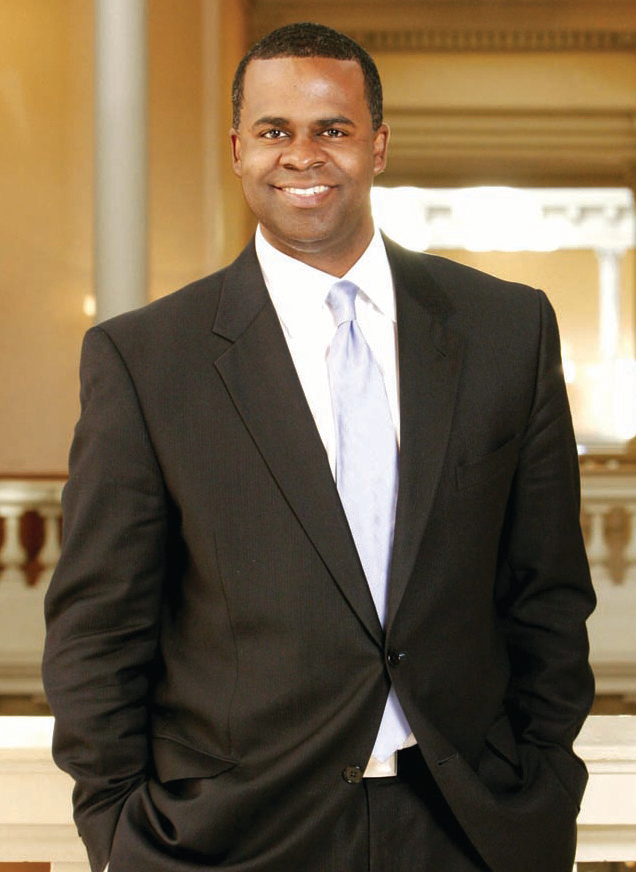
- Reed in 2011

59th Mayor of Atlanta
- In office January 3, 2010 – January 2, 2018
- Preceded by: Shirley Franklin
- Succeeded by: Keisha Lance Bottoms

Member of the Georgia Senate from the 35th district
- In office January 13, 2003 – September 1, 2009
- Preceded by: Donzella James
- Succeeded by: Donzella James

Member of the Georgia House of Representatives from the 52nd district
- In office January 11, 1999 – January 13, 2003
- Preceded by: Henrietta Canty
- Succeeded by: Fran Millar

Personal details
- Born: Mohammed Kasim Reed; June 10, 1969 (age 57) Plainfield, New Jersey, U.S.
- Party: Democratic
- Education: Howard University (AB, JD)

Mohammed Kasim Reed (born June 10, 1969) is an American lawyer and politician who served as the 59th mayor of Atlanta, Georgia's state capital and largest city, from 2010 to 2018. A Democrat, Reed was a member of the Georgia House of Representatives from 1998 to 2002 and represented the 35th District in the Georgia State Senate from 2003 to 2009. He served as campaign manager for Shirley Franklin's successful Atlanta mayoral campaign in 2001. After Franklin was term limited from the mayor's office, Reed successfully ran for the position in 2009. Inaugurated on January 4, 2010, Reed was elected to a second term in 2013.

On June 10, 2021, Reed declared that he was seeking another term as Atlanta's mayor in the 2021 election. He placed third in the November election, failing to qualify for the runoff election.

== Early life and education ==
Reed was born in Plainfield, New Jersey. His family moved to Fulton County, Georgia, when he was an infant. His family belonged to the United Methodist Church. His father had considered converting to Islam and named his son Mohammed Kasim, to the consternation of his minister grandfather. Reed graduated from Fulton County's Utoy Springs Elementary School and Westwood High School, now Westlake High School. According to a DNA analysis, he claims descent from the Igbo people of Nigeria.

=== Howard University ===
Reed attended Howard University in Washington, D.C., graduating in 1991 with a degree in political science.

Students took over the Howard administration building in 1989, protesting having Republican National Committee Chairman Lee Atwater on the university's board of trustees, saying that he had contributed to "growing anti-black sentiment in America" through his management of President George H. W. Bush's campaign. Atwater resigned from the board. Reed disagreed with their action, saying there was nothing wrong with having the Republican Party try to win the votes of black students. He felt it would have been better if Atwater had met with the protesting students, as he might have learned more about their position. For instance, "[he] might have gained insight into a generation of students portrayed as destitute and in need of more federal support." Reed noted "that 85 percent of Howard's 12,000 students receive federal aid."

An early entrepreneur, by 1989 Reed made $40,000 running a jewelry business which he started at age sixteen. In 1990 he was invited to comment on the Persian Gulf War military buildup on the MacNeil/Lehrer NewsHour. Also, in November of that year he was featured in Black Enterprise.

While at college, Reed interned for Congressman Joseph Patrick Kennedy II. During his internship he learned about a federal dollar-for-dollar matching grant program. In his senior year and as the undergraduate trustee on the university's board of trustees, he instituted a $15-per-semester student fee increase to be matched by the federal grant, with monies to be earmarked for the university's endowment. The fees were expected to total nearly $300,000 per semester. The estimate was conservative in the sense that it only assumes the fees from slightly more than 75% of the 12,000 students. The four-year totals would approach a $2.4 million addition to the endowment. Reed earned a Bachelor of Arts degree in political science in 1991. He earned his Juris Doctor degree from Howard University School of Law in 1995. In 2002 Reed was appointed as the youngest general trustee to serve on Howard's board of trustees and continues to serve on that board.

== Legal career ==
After graduation from law school Reed joined the law firm of Paul, Hastings, Janofsky & Walker LLP, and later became a partner at Holland & Knight LLP, both law firms being international firms with offices in Atlanta.

== Political career ==
=== Georgia State Representative ===
Henrietta Canty was a member of the Georgia House of Representatives for the 52nd district during 1975–80 and 1990–98, resigning in 1998 to run for Georgia State Insurance Commissioner. Seven candidates vied for her seat in the July 21, 1998 Democratic primary election. Reed was the leading vote-getter with 36.6% of the vote, finishing well ahead of community leaders Horace Mann Bond and Eric V. Thomas, the second and third-place finishers, respectively. This resulted in a head-to-head August 11 run-off election, which Reed won with 60.6% of the vote, against the second-place finisher, Horace Mann Bond II, who had received 19.1% of the vote in July. Reed ran unopposed in the November 3 general election and won the Assembly seat.

Reed ran a re-election campaign in 2000, when he was challenged by Clarence Canty, the son of Henrietta Canty. Reed won the July 18, 2000, Democratic primary by a large margin, with 77.0% of the vote, winning by a 12.7% margin. In the November 7, 2000, general election he ran unopposed. In the House of Representatives, he represented a predominately African-American constituency in south Atlanta. Reed served as a member of the House Judiciary, Education, and Congressional and Legislative Reapportionment Committees.

While in office, in 2001 Reed served as the campaign manager for Shirley Franklin's successful election campaign to become the 58th mayor of Atlanta. As a campaign manager in an election occurring in the shadow of the September 11 attacks, he surveyed potential voters' perceptions of the propriety of the campaign's advertising broadcasts. At the time certain ads were thought to focus on sensitive topics. After winning the election, Franklin chose Reed as one of two co-chairs on her transition team. In this role he was charged with identifying and reviewing candidates for cabinet-level positions.

For the 2000 election, House District 52 had been entirely contained in Fulton County. After the decennary redistricting, the 52nd district was entirely within DeKalb County for the November 5, 2002, election which was won by Fran Millar.

=== Georgia State Senator ===
In 2000 the 35th Georgia State Senate District was entirely contained in Fulton County, and State Senator Donzella James was an uncontested Democrat in the November 7 general election. In 2002 four-term incumbent senator James vacated the seat and contested David Scott and other contenders for the Georgia's 13th congressional district, which was created after the 2000 census when Georgia added two new congressional districts. When Reed first ran for election in the 35 state senate district in the 2002 Democratic primary, it included 19 precincts in Douglas County, Georgia, and 333 in Fulton County. The district includes the southern portion of Fulton County (Atlanta, Alpharetta, College Park, East Point, Fairburn, Hapeville, Mountain Park, Palmetto, Roswell, Sandy Springs, and Union City) and the northeast portion of Douglas County (Douglasville, and Lithia Springs). Reed won the district's five-way primary on August 20, 2002, with 65.8% of the vote, and then he was uncontested in the November 5, 2002 general election. In 2004 James challenged Reed for the seat she had held before him, but he won the July 20, 2004 Democratic primary election by a 58.8%–41.2% margin. He ran unopposed in the November 2, 2004 general election, and he also ran unopposed in his 2006 and 2008 primary and general elections.

In January 2006, Reed introduced a bill to authorize scholastic teaching of the textbook The Bible and Its Influence by the non-partisan, ecumenical Bible Literacy Project. The bible curriculum bill, which came a few years after Democrats opposed Republican attempts to promote teaching a translation of the scriptures, was an attempt to preempt a Republican attempt to display the Ten Commandments in schools. Faith is an area where Georgia Democrats differ from the national party. The bill passed in the State Senate by a 50–1 margin on February 3, and it eventually became law.

Reed's committee assignments were the following: Senate Judiciary Committee, Special Judiciary Committee, Ethics Committee, Transportation Committee and the State and Local Government Operations Committee. He also serves as vice-chairman of the Georgia Senate Democratic Caucus. He has also served the Georgia Democratic Senatorial Campaign Committee as its chairman. In addition, he was a partner at Holland & Knight LLP. Previously, he worked in the music industry for Paul, Hastings, Janofsky & Walker LLP.

=== Mayor of Atlanta ===
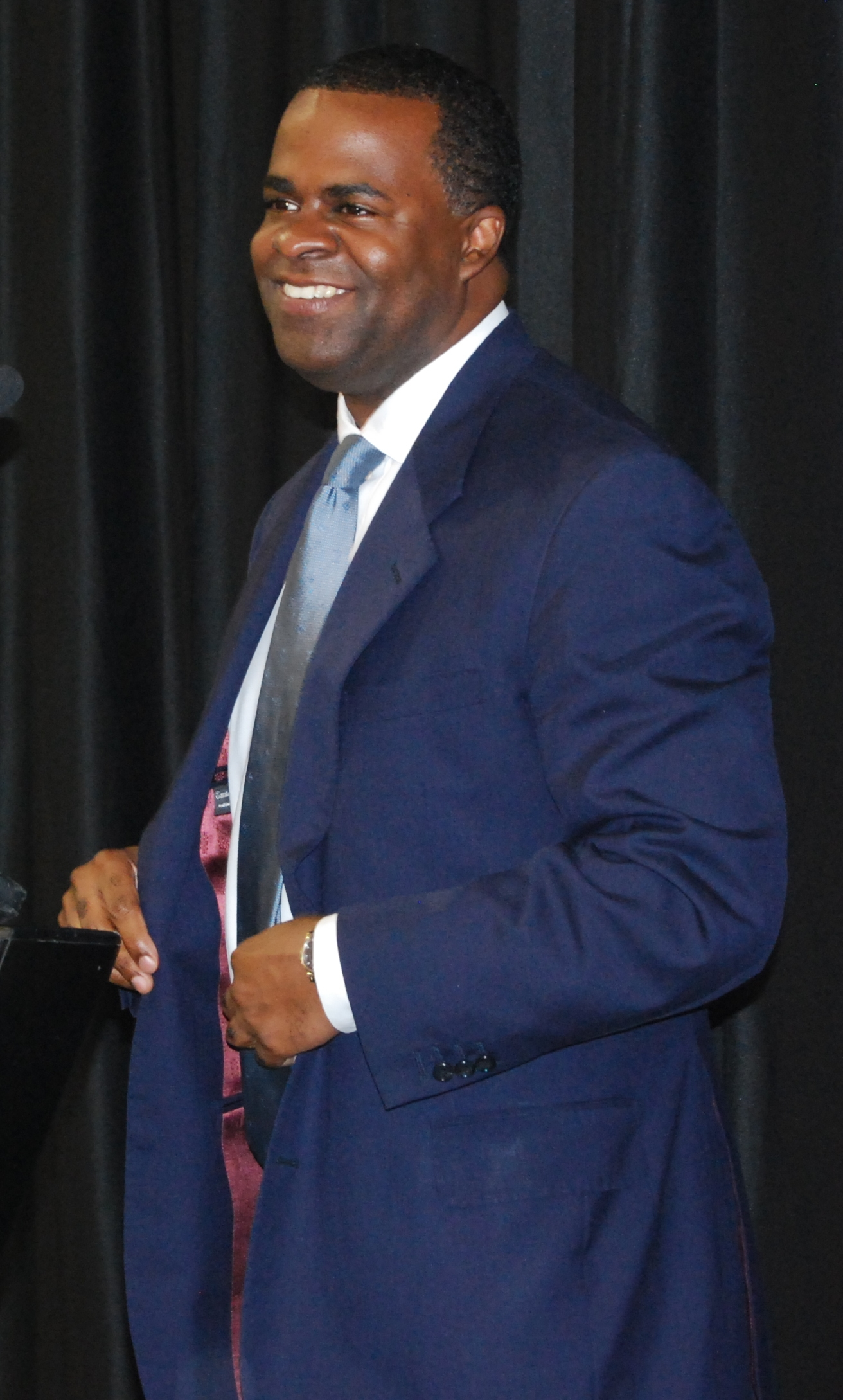
Kasim Reed in 2009

A month before the February 5, 2008 Super Tuesday Georgia Democratic primary, Reed endorsed Barack Obama. In March 2008, Reed announced an exploratory committee, named ONE Atlanta, to investigate his viability as a candidate in the 2009 Atlanta mayoral election. Two-term incumbent Mayor Franklin was term limited and could not run again. His exploratory committee announcement was coupled with an announcement that he would be pursuing a Hillary Clinton-style coalition-building tour. During the summer of 2008, ONE Atlanta announced that the exploratory committee had become a formal campaign committee.

On September 1, Reed resigned from the Georgia Senate to run for mayor. No candidate won a majority in the November 3 general election, and Donzella James defeated Torrey O. Johnson in the runoff election on December 1 to replace Reed.

In the November 3, 2009 election, Reed qualified for a December 1 runoff election against Mary Norwood. According to The Atlanta Journal-Constitution, Reed had a winning majority in the runoff election that seemed destined to be contested by a recount. The New York Times described the race as too close to call with 98 to 99 percent of the votes counted and Reed leading by only 620 of the 84,000 votes cast. On December 9 after the completion of a recount Reed was declared the winner by a margin of 714 votes, after which Mary Norwood officially conceded. Reed took office on January 4, 2010.

Thomas Friedman has praised Reed in The New York Times for balancing the city's budget by limiting the pensions of city employees. This money was instead spent on the police force, as well as on community centers in poor neighborhoods (rather than on reversing the 42% increase in property taxes passed in 2009). He praises Reed as "combining a soft touch with a hard head".

Reed announced his campaign for re-election as mayor on August 26, 2013. He was elected to a second term on November 5, 2013.

==== Bribery charges and federal indictment ====
In February 2017, Reed fired the city's chief procurement officer after two city contractors pleaded guilty to federal bribery charges. At a February 9 news conference, Reed insisted, "I have never taken a bribe", and gave reporters physical access to 406 boxes of documents that had been demanded by federal investigators.

On August 15, 2018, Katrina Taylor-Parks pleaded guilty to conspiring to accept bribe payments while serving as the City of Atlanta's Deputy Chief of Staff to the Mayor Kasim Reed for approximately eight years. She was sentenced to five years in prison. Atlanta's top purchasing officer, Adam Smith, received a reduced sentence of 27 months in prison. In a separate hearing, Mitzi Bickers, the former Human Services Director and campaign advisor of Mayor Reed is accused of taking over 2 million dollars in bribes.

== Policy positions ==
=== Georgia state flag ===
Georgia State Flag

1920–1956 state flag

1956–2001 state flag

2001–2003 state flag

2003 – current state flag

Since the 1990s, the official State Flag of Georgia had been a center of controversy as it incorporated the historic Confederate flag dating to the American Civil War, which among some people is thought to symbolize resistance to cultural changes in the state. After 2001 changes to the flag which removed this, Governor of Georgia Roy Barnes, who had led the flag-redesign effort, was defeated for re-election; many thought it was the result of the political backlash. The 1956 version with the Confederate States of America battle emblem, known as a St. Andrew's cross, was a continuing topic of debate for southern heritage proponents.

Reed served as one of Governor Sonny Perdue's floor leaders in debates that led to the ratification of the current (2003) version of the state flag. Reed's leadership in dealmaking with Senate Republicans kept the 1956 version of the flag off Perdue's statewide referendum on the flag in 2003. The referendum was originally a two-part referendum pitting the 2001 version of the flag against the proposed version and conditional on failed ratification of a new flag considering other flags including the 1956 version. Under this format if the legislators did not approve the newly designed flag over the existing one they could have pursued other designs including the one with the controversial 1956 version of the flag. Reed and a contingent of black legislators from Atlanta limited the referendum to a single vote of preference between the 2003 version and the 2001 version.

=== Gay marriage ===
On May 21, 2009, Reed caused controversy in Atlanta's LGBT community when he stated that he supported civil unions for gays, but not gay marriage. In December 2012, however, Reed announced his support for marriage equality for same-sex couples.

In January 2015, Reed fired Atlanta Fire Chief Kelvin Cochran following Cochran's self-publication and distribution of a book without permission from Reed or the city's Ethics Department. However, Cochran did obtain permission from Nina Hickson, the City of Atlanta's Ethics Officer. The book, in expressing his interpretation of Christian teaching, describes homosexuality as a "perversion." Cochran wrote and self-published the book in 2013. There remain questions regarding whether Mayor Reed knew of the book and its contents before Cochran was fired. Cochran has since filed suit in federal court alleging wrongful termination. This case has been decided in favor of Kelvin Cochran and the City of Atlanta has agreed to a $1.2 million settlement.

In June 2015, Reed praised the Supreme Court's ruling in favor of same-sex marriage and ordered Atlanta City Hall to be lit in rainbow colors in celebration of what he called "a momentous victory for freedom, equality, and love."

=== Transportation investment tax ===
Along with Georgia Governor Nathan Deal, Reed was a major proponent of a campaign for a transportation special-purpose local-option sales tax, which would have levied a 1% local sales tax for ten years, from 2013 until 2022, to fund transportation infrastructure projects. Reed said that the passage of the referendum would add jobs and alleviate congestion in the city, while "failing to pass the measure would be economically damaging" for Atlanta. The proposal was defeated in a referendum, however. Reed stated that he would "work with opponents on the next plan to ease congestion."

== Personal life ==
In 2014, Reed announced his marriage to Sarah-Elizabeth Langford; two months later, the mayor's office announced the birth of the couple's daughter. Divorce proceedings began in 2019.

== Awards and recognition ==
Mayor Reed's civic leadership and service have been nationally recognized in publications such as the Atlanta Journal-Constitution, the Washington Post, the New York Times, Ebony, and Black Enterprise. He was selected as one of Georgia Trend magazine's "40 under 40 Rising Stars" in 2001, one of "10 Outstanding Atlantans" in Outstanding Atlanta, a member of the Leadership Georgia Class of 2000, and a board member of the Metropolitan Atlanta Arts Fund. 2011, he received an honorary degree in Doctor of Laws from Oglethorpe University.

In 2017, the Atlanta Hawks retired the jersey number 59 in honor of Reed who was involved with the team throughout his tenure.

== See also ==
- List of mayors of the largest 50 US cities

Georgia House of Representatives
Preceded by Henrietta Canty	Member of the Georgia House of Representatives from the 52nd district 1999–2003	Succeeded by Fran Millar
Georgia State Senate
Preceded by Donzella James	Member of the Georgia Senate from the 35th district 2003–2009	Succeeded by Donzella James
Political offices
Preceded by Shirley Franklin	Mayor of Atlanta; 2010–2018	Succeeded by Keisha Lance Bottoms
