= Ivey William Gregory =

American politician (1906–1984)

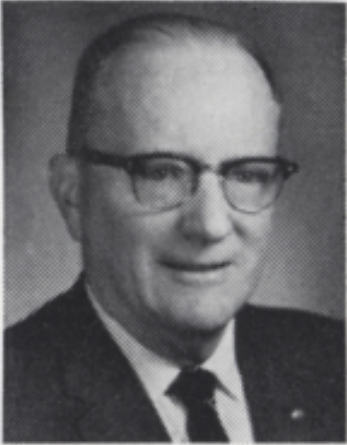
- Official portrait, circa 1966

Member of the Georgia Senate from the 15th district
- In office August 17, 1965 – January 13, 1969
- Preceded by: A. Perry Gordy
- Succeeded by: Floyd Hudgins

Personal details
- Born: May 30, 1906 Dawson, Georgia, U.S.
- Died: January 17, 1984 (aged 77) Columbus, Georgia, U.S.
- Party: Republican
- Spouse: Lucile Adele Chalaron (m. 1931)
- Children: 1
- Education: Tulane University

Ivey William "Bill" Gregory Jr. (May 30, 1906 – January 17, 1984), also known as I. W. Gregory, was an American politician from Georgia. He served in the Georgia State Senate as a Republican from 1965 to 1969, representing Georgia's 15th Senate District.

== Early life and education ==
Gregory was born on May 30, 1906, in Dawson, Georgia, to Ivey William Gregory and Mary Eliza (Jordan) Gregory. He attended the Boys High School in Atlanta, where he graduated in 1923. He earned his Bachelor of Science degree in chemistry from Tulane University in 1929. He first worked for the Curtis Publishing Company in Philadelphia and later joined the National Cash Register Company in 1936.

== Political career ==
On June 26, 1965, Gregory was unanimously appointed by Muscogee County Republicans to run for the state senate following a vacancy left by the resignation of A. Perry Gordy, who was appointed director of the Columbus Area Vocational Technical School. He was sworn in on August 17, 1965, by Judge Carlton Mobley, an associate justice of the Georgia Supreme Court.

== Personal life ==
He married his wife, Lucile Adele Chalaron, on June 10, 1931. Together they had one daughter.
