= Archie Byron =

American artist, politician, and businessman

- Archie Byron in his studio in Atlanta, Georgia
- Born: February 2, 1928; Atlanta, Georgia
- Died: August 29, 2005 (aged 77); Atlanta, Georgia
- Known for: Relief sculptures
- Movement: Modern Art

Member of the Atlanta City Council District 9
- In office 1982–1990
- Preceded by: Arthur Langford Jr.
- Succeeded by: Jared Samples

Archie Byron (February 2, 1928 – August 29, 2005) was an American sculptor, painter, small business owner, city councilman for the city of Atlanta (1982–1990), and political activist. He claimed to have co-founded the first African-American owned detective agency. He is best known for his relief sculptures which he created using sawdust, water and glue. He would just as often paint his "sawdust art" as he would allow the natural hues of the drying wood to stand alone without augmentation.

== Life ==
Byron was born on February 2, 1928 (Groundhog Day) in the Buttermilk Bottom district of Atlanta, Georgia. His father was a musician who ran a teaching studio on Auburn Avenue and his mother was a seamstress. He was named after his mother's mother, Archie, who was half English and half Native American (unidentified tribal specifics). His mother and father had nine children and Byron was raised primarily by his aforementioned grandmother, Archie. He and all of his siblings attended Catholic school in Downtown Atlanta and catechism on weekends.

Byron's father performed at the same church that Martin Luther King Jr.'s family attended. Byron and King were childhood friends. In fact, after King's assassination, Byron's security company provided bodyguards and surveillance for the King family. Despite their close relationship, Byron nor his family ever marched with King's movement because of King's stance against bearing arms, especially during peaceful protests. Byron recalled, "I always said that I would not march unless they would let me carry my shotgun."

Byron joined the U.S. Navy and served during the end of World War II. He saw combat in Okinawa. After the war, he returned to Atlanta in 1949 and attended technical college on the G.I. Bill and became certified in architectural drafting and bricklaying. He married a woman named Joyce and they raised four children together. Byron supported his family through 16 years of work as a brick mason and in the construction field.

Law enforcement always fascinated Byron. As a child, he wanted to become a police officer, despite segregation of the police force in Atlanta. Even after desegregation of the force in 1945, black officers could not arrest or subdue white citizens and were obliged to call white officers to make arrests. At age ten, Byron recalled having his life threatened by a police officer, and he knew then that he wanted to stay critically involved in the criminal justice system. Thus, in 1961, he partnered with two other black men and the Fulton County Police Department to create America's first African-American detective agency. Four years later, he created his own detective agency as well as a bait and tackle shop, a gun repair shop, a firing range, a security guard training school, and a restaurant. From 1982 to 1990 he sat on the Atlanta city council for District 9.

He died on August 29, 2005.

== Career ==
Byron recalled that his first inspiration to make art came from his wife, Joyce. While on a security detail in 1975, Byron saw a tree root that resembled a gun lodged underneath a fence. He brought it home and his wife told him to make something out of it in his shop. He carved the likeness of a gun into the wood and began the early stages of his art career, which he called "tree-limb art or nature art." Similar to his contemporaries, Bessie Harvey and Ralph Griffin, Byron would reveal a dormant form that he saw in pieces of wood through sculpture and painting.

In 1977, a second wave of inspiration came to him while working in his gun repair and wood shop. While amassing and discarding piles of sawdust, Byron decided that he could somehow use this material to make her work. After trial and error, he combined the sawdust with water and white glue to make a strong, viscous material that he could apply in layers and sculpt into detailed bas-reliefs and free standing forms. Byron called this work "sawdust art" and he explained the arduous, but rewarding process as, "messy to work with. You've got to layer it on one layer after another, and you've got to wash your hands about fifty-six times a day. It takes so long to do a piece, but that stuff is really durable. One collector I know researched it and said it would stand up for over four hundred years."

Byron's range of subject matter is boundless, traversing through surrealist landscapes, distorted figures, "religious icons, historical figures, and ordinary people," His abstracted figurative compositions are his best-known work, particularly his Anatomy series (I-IV).Anatomy I | Souls Grown Deep Foundation Anatomy II | Souls Grown Deep Foundation Anatomy III | Souls Grown Deep Foundation Anatomy IV | Souls Grown Deep Foundation His dismemberment and reconstruction of male and female forms into one form is combines cryptic symbolism with his own innovative, modern process. Byron's creation, undoing, and re-joining of fragments of black life in Atlanta "reflect the social issues that concerned the artist during his terms as a councilman."

== Exhibitions ==
- Living Traditions: Southern Black Folk Art. 17 Aug.- 27 Oct. 1991, The Museum of York County, Rock Hill South Carolina.
- Passionate Visions of the American South. 1993–5, New Orleans Museum of Art, New Orleans, LA.
- Southern Folk Art from the Permanent Collection. 28 Apr.- 22 Jul. 2012, Georgia Museum of Art at the University of Georgia, Atlanta.
- Testimony: Vernacular Art of the African-American South. Jul. 2003–2004.
- Bearing Witness: African-American Art of the South. 1997, Schaumburg Center for Research on Black Culture, New York City.
- Revelations: Art from the African American South. 3 Jun 2017- 1 Apr. 2018, Fine Arts Museum of San Francisco, San Francisco, CA.

== Permanent collections ==
Byron's work is included in the permanent collections of:

- Smithsonian American Art Museum,
- Fine Arts Museums of San Francisco,
- Minneapolis Institute of Art,
- High Museum of Art,
- Museum of Fine Arts, Houston, and
- Modern Primitive.
- Gadsden Arts Center and Museum
