= Georgia's 35th Senate district =

State senate district in Georgia

Georgia's 35th State Senate district
Senator
Jaha Howard
- Demographics: 27.60% White; 53.15% Black; 9.94% Hispanic; 4.82% Asian; 0.18% Native American; 0.04% Hawaiian/Pacific Islander; 0.71% Other; 4.51% Multiracial
- Population (2020) • Voting age: 192,472; 151,934

District 35 of the Georgia Senate is located in Metro Atlanta.

The district includes southeastern Cobb County and western Fulton County, including parts of Atlanta, Smyrna, South Fulton, and Vinings. The district includes the Atlanta neighborhoods of Adamsville, Bolton, Collier Heights, and Riverside, as well as the Fulton Industrial corridor.

The seat is currently represented by Jaha Howard.

== List of senators ==
Member	Party	Years	Residence	Electoral history	Counties
Thomas G. Callaway, Jr		1947–1949	Covington		
Gus Stark		1949–1951	Monroe		
Joseph Mann		1951–1953	Stockbridge		
Thomas G. Callaway, Jr		1953–1955	Covington		
Eugene Kelly		1955–1957	Covington		
Edward E. McGarity		1957–1959	McDonough		
C. O. Nixon		1959–1961	Covington		
Eugene Kelly		1961–1963	Monroe		
Frank E. Coggin	Democratic	1963–1967	Hapeville		
Perry J. Hudson	Democratic	1967–1983	Hapeville		
Frank E. Coggin	Democratic	1983–1984	Hapeville		
Arthur Langford Jr.	Democratic	1984 – April 15, 1994		Died in office.	
Donzella James	Democratic	1995 – January 13, 2003		Resigned to run for U.S. House.	
Kasim Reed	Democratic	January 13, 2003 – September 1, 2009	Atlanta	Resigned to run for mayor of Atlanta in 2009.	
Donzella James	Democratic	January 3, 2009 – January 13, 2025		Won in special election. Redistricted into the 28th Senate district in 2025.	
Jason Esteves	Democratic	January 13, 2025 – September 10, 2025		Redistricted from the 6th Senate district in 2025	
Jaha Howard	Democratic	December 17, 2025 – present		Won in special election.	
