= William Ligon =

American politician

William Theophilus Ligon Jr.

Member of the Georgia Senate from the 3rd district
- In office January 10, 2011 – January 10, 2021
- Preceded by: Jeff Chapman
- Succeeded by: Sheila McNeill

Personal details
- Born: April 3, 1961 (age 65) Brunswick, Georgia
- Party: Republican

William Theophilus Ligon Jr. (born April 3, 1961) is an American former politician. He served in the Georgia State Senate as the senator from the 3rd district between 2011 and 2021.

After Joe Biden won Georgia in the 2020 presidential election, Ligon pushed for a special session of the Georgia General Assembly to overturn Georgia's presidential election results.
