= Sheila McNeill =

American politician (1943–2024)

Member of the Georgia Senate from the 3rd district
- In office January 11, 2021 – January 9, 2023
- Preceded by: William Ligon
- Succeeded by: Mike Hodges

Personal details
- Born: February 15, 1943
- Died: August 5, 2024 (aged 81)
- Party: Republican

Sheila Mobley McNeill (February 15, 1943 – August 5, 2024) was an American politician from Brunswick, Georgia. McNeill was a Republican member of the Georgia State Senate for the 3rd district and a former president of the Navy League.

== Political career ==
McNeill was elected to the Georgia State Senate for the 3rd district. She was vice chair of the natural resources and the environment committee, secretary of the veterans, military and homeland security committee and a member of the education and youth committee and the state institutions and property committee. In 2022, she announced she was stepping down from being a senator to spend more time with her husband. The Governor of Georgia, Brian Kemp paid tribute to her in a gubernatorial proclamation to thank her for her supporting the military and her local area.

== Personal life ==
McNeill attended Glynn Academy in Brunswick to earn her diploma. McNeill and her husband, Arlie, resided in Kings Bay, Georgia. They had one daughter and four grandchildren. In 1995, McNeill acted as the founding president of the St. Marys Submarine Museum in Kings Bay, Georgia.

She was the National President of the U.S. Navy League from 2003 to 2005. In 2019, McNeill published the book "What are You Doing Here?", in which she chronicled her experience as the first woman to hold this position. She served as president of the Camden Partnership until 2022 when she resigned in order to focus more on her work in the Georgia Senate. McNeil died on August 5, 2024. In 2025, the President pro-tempore of the Georgia Senate, John F. Kennedy announced a scholarship fund in her name to provide funding for Navy midshipmen whilst attending the United States Naval Academy. Part of State Route 40 was also dedicated to her as the "Sen. Sheila McNeil Memorial Highway".
