= Sally Harrell =

American politician

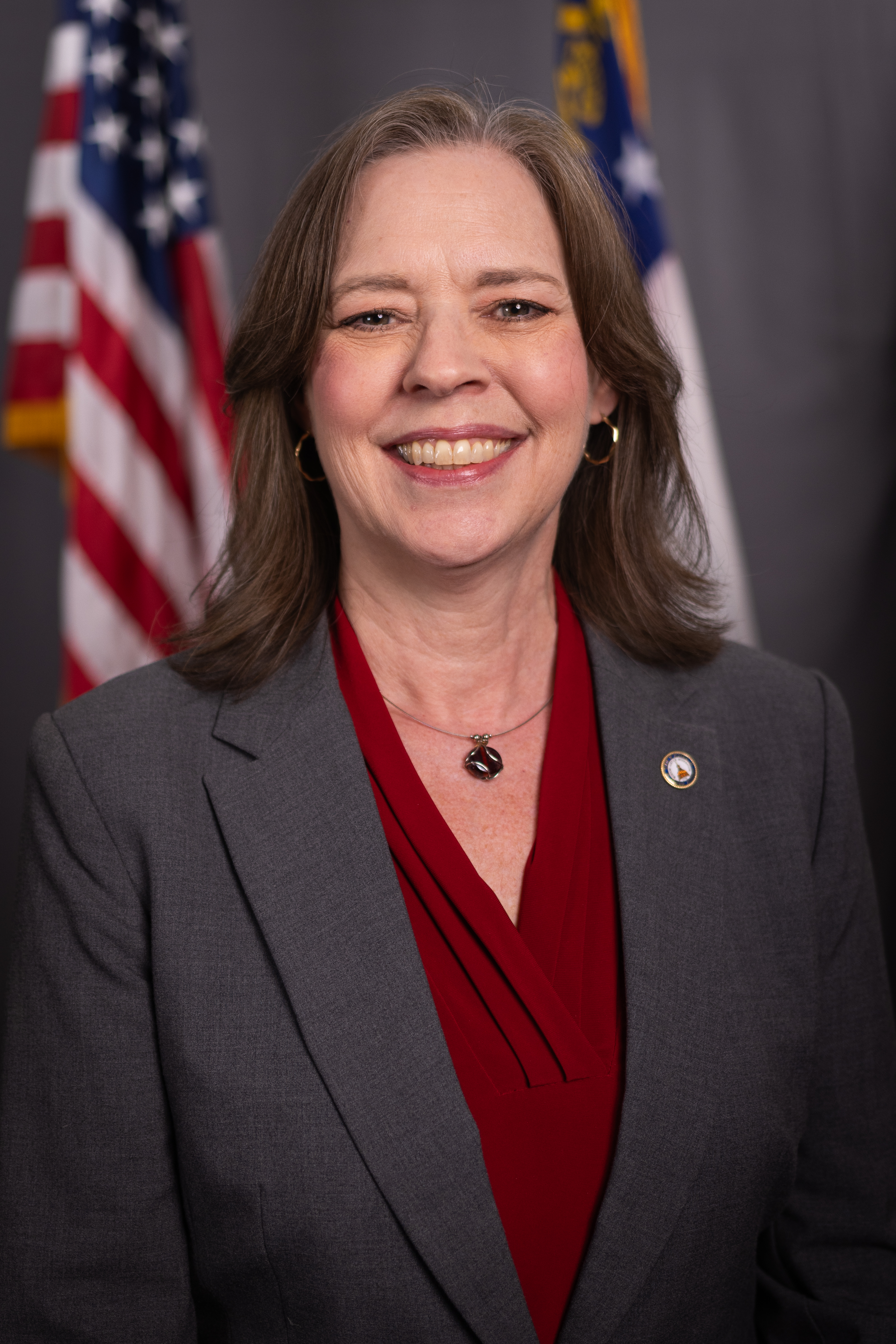

Member of the Georgia State Senate from the 40th district
- Incumbent
- Assumed office January 14, 2019
- Preceded by: Fran Millar

Member of the Georgia House of Representatives from the 54th district
- In office January 13, 2003 – April 7, 2004
- Preceded by: Tyrone L. Brooks Sr.
- Succeeded by: Don R. Thomas

Member of the Georgia House of Representatives from the 62nd district
- In office January 11, 1999 – April 11, 2002
- Preceded by: Tom Sherrill
- Succeeded by: Randal Mangham

Personal details
- Born: March 5, 1966 (age 60) Indianapolis, Indiana
- Party: Democratic
- Spouse: Jay Harrell
- Children: 2 children
- Education: University of Georgia, Georgia State University
- Profession: Politician
- Website: www.sallyharrell.org

Sally Roettger Harrell (born March 5, 1966) is an American politician from the state of Georgia. She is a Democrat and member of the Georgia Senate since 2019. She previously served in the Georgia House of Representatives from 1999 through 2005.

== Early life and career ==
Harrell was on born March 5, 1966, in Indianapolis, Indiana. She holds a Bachelor's degree from Georgia State University and a Master of Social Work from the University of Georgia. Harrell lives in Chamblee, Georgia, with her husband Jay.

Prior to serving in the legislature, Harrell served as the Executive Director of the Healthy Mothers, Healthy Babies Coalition of Georgia.

== Political career ==
Harrell was elected to the Georgia House of Representatives in 1998. In the Georgia House, she served on the Education, Human Relations & Aging, Children & Youth and Appropriations Committees (Health Sub-Committee). Harrell chose not to seek re-election to the Georgia House of Representatives in 2004 due to redistricting issues. The maps passed by the Georgia legislature in 2001 were thrown out and redrawn by the Court, blind of incumbent's addresses. Her district changed so massively geographically that she decided not to seek re-election.

Harrell explored running in the 2017 special election to represent Georgia's 6th congressional district in the United States House of Representatives but ultimately decided not to file for the seat.

Harrell ran for the 40th district seat in the Georgia State Senate in the 2018 election. Harrell defeated incumbent Fran Millar.
