= Neil L. Gillis =

American politician

Member of the Georgia Senate
- In office 1915–1916

Member of the Georgia House of Representatives from Emanuel County
- In office 1909–1910

Personal details
- Born: Neil Lee Gillis; March 12, 1864 Emanuel County, Georgia
- Died: October 27, 1933 (aged 69)
- Party: Democratic
- Spouse: Lougenia Youmans Gillis (m. 1888)
- Relations: Jim L. Gillis Sr. (son); Hugh Gillis (grandson); Jim L. Gillis Jr. (grandson)
- Children: Neil Lee Jr.; Jim L. Sr.; Kate; Annie May
- Occupation: Banker, politician

Neil Lee Gillis (March 12, 1864 – October 27, 1933) was an American banker and politician known as the "father of Treutlen County" after his efforts spearheading its creation in 1918. Gillis served in the Georgia House of Representatives from 1909 to 1910, representing Emanuel County, and in the Georgia State Senate as Treutlen County's first state senator.

Gillis was born on March 12, 1864, in Emanuel County, Georgia. He married Lougenia Youmans in 1888; she died on February 15, 1922. They had five children: Neil Lee Jr., Jim L. Sr., Kate, Annie May, and "Mrs. Jim Peterson". Gillis died on October 27, 1933.
