= Elmer W. Teague =

American politician

Member of the Georgia House of Representatives
- In office 1961–1964

Personal details
- Born: October 28, 1923 Pickens County, Georgia, U.S.
- Died: May 26, 2016 (aged 92)
- Party: Democratic

Elmer W. Teague (October 28, 1923 – May 26, 2016) was an American politician. He served as a Democratic member of the Georgia House of Representatives.

== Life and career ==
Teague was born in Pickens County, Georgia. He attended Canton High School and Dawsonville High School.

Teague served in the Georgia House of Representatives from 1961 to 1964.

Teague died on May 26, 2016, at the age of 92.
