= J. R. Rhodes Jr. =

American politician (1939–2021)

Member of the Georgia House of Representatives
- In office 1963–1965

Personal details
- Born: James Robert Rhodes Jr. February 20, 1939 Dougherty County, Georgia, U.S.
- Died: January 15, 2021 (aged 81)
- Party: Democratic
- Education: University of Mississippi

James Robert Rhodes Jr. (February 20, 1939 – January 15, 2021) was an American politician. He served as a Democratic member of the Georgia House of Representatives.

== Life and career ==
Rhodes was born in Dougherty County, Georgia. He attended the University of Mississippi.

Rhodes served in the Georgia House of Representatives from 1963 to 1965.

Rhodes died on January 15, 2021, at the age of 81.
