= Thomas I. Sangster =

American politician

Member of the Georgia House of Representatives
- In office 1961 – April 1, 1963

Personal details
- Born: July 25, 1931 Dooly County, Georgia, U.S.
- Died: July 18, 2014 (aged 82)
- Party: Democratic
- Education: Georgia State University

Thomas I. Sangster (July 25, 1931 – July 18, 2014) was an American politician. He served as a Democratic member of the Georgia House of Representatives.

== Life and career ==
Sangster was born in Dooly County, Georgia. He attended Georgia State University.

Sangster served in the Georgia House of Representatives from 1961 to 1963.

Sangster died on July 18, 2014, at the age of 82.
