= Floyd Hudgins =

American politician

Member of the Georgia State Senate from the 15th district
- In office 1969–1989
- Preceded by: Ivey William Gregory
- Succeeded by: Greg Parker

Personal details
- Born: March 11, 1930 Etowah County, Alabama, U.S.
- Died: May 11, 2010 (aged 80)
- Party: Democratic
- Spouse: Margie Louise Hand
- Children: 5

Floyd Hudgins (March 11, 1930 – May 11, 2010) was an American politician. He served as a Democratic member for the 15th district of the Georgia State Senate.

== Life and career ==
Hudgins was born in Etowah County, Alabama, the son of Ollie Belle Strickland and William Lonnie Hudgins. He attended St. Clair County High School. Hudgins served in the Georgia National Guard from 1952-1960 and was an operating engineer.

In 1964, Hudgins was elected to fill the vacant position of the Chatahoochee County Georgia House of Representatives Seat to fill the unexpired terms of Joseph N. King (deceased).

In 1969, Hudgins was elected to represent the 15th district of the Georgia State Senate. He served until 1989, when he succeeded by Gary Parker.

Hudgins died in May 2010, at the age of 80.
