= Fran Millar =

American politician (born 1949)

Member of the Georgia Senate from the 40th district
- In office 2011 – January 13, 2019
- Succeeded by: Sally Harrell

Personal details
- Born: December 9, 1949 (age 76) New London, Connecticut, U.S.
- Party: Republican
- Website: http://www.senatorfranmillar.com

Fran Millar (born December 9, 1949) is an American politician. He is a former member of the Georgia State Senate from the 40th District, serving from 2011 to 2019. He is a member of the Republican Party. Millar served in the Georgia General Assembly beginning in 1999, both in the Georgia House of Representatives and the Georgia State Senate.

== Early life ==
On December 9, 1949, Millar was born in New London, Connecticut.

== Education ==
Millar earned a Bachelor of Arts in economics from West Virginia Wesleyan College.

== Career ==
Millar was an independent consultant, and serves as an ex officio member of the Dunwoody Homeowners board of directors.

Millar is a very active member at Dunwoody United Methodist Church and Cherokee Town and Country Club.

Millar has been in public office since 1999. He has served as a representative to Georgia's 79th House District and senator for Georgia's 40th Senate District.

Millar served his first terms in the state legislature in 1998–2010 with the House of Representatives. He was recognized as Policymaker of the Year in 2008 by the Georgia Association for Career and Technical Education. He was also awarded the 2010 Advocacy Award by All About Developmental Disabilities. He was first elected to the state senate in 2010. In 2012, the National Federations of Independent Business (NFIB) awarded Senator Millar with the Guardian of Small Business Award. In 2013, Senator Millar was recognized by the American Conservative Union (ACU) for his support of bills based on conservative principles during the legislation session. In 2014 he was named the Georgia Chamber's 'Legislator of the Year'.

In 2017, Millar – chairman of the state senate's Higher Education Committee – was one of four Republican senators who voted against a bill that would allow licensed individuals to carry handguns onto public university campuses across the state of Georgia.

On November 6, 2018, Millar was defeated by Sally Harrell, a former state representative

== Controversy ==
In 2014, Millar sparked outrage when he suggested that he opposes new Sunday voting hours because they are only in 3 Democratic majority precincts (African-American majority) versus countywide. The locations were amended as a result of his complaint.

In 2017, Millar admitted to gerrymandering, saying "I'll be very blunt: These lines were not drawn to get Hank Johnson's protégé [Jon Ossoff] to be my representative. And you didn't hear that," and "They were not drawn for that purpose, OK? They were not drawn for that purpose."

Also in 2017, Millar was accused of engaging in money laundering activities for Congressman Buddy Carter; the complaint was subsequently dismissed as frivolous.

== Personal life ==
Millar's wife is Mary. They have three children, Lisa, Bill, and Meredith.
