= Charles M. Jones (Georgia politician) =

American politician

Member of the Georgia House of Representatives
- In office 1961–1970

Personal details
- Born: September 27, 1930 Liberty County, Georgia, U.S.
- Died: May 2, 2007 (aged 76)
- Party: Democratic
- Education: University of Georgia

Charles M. Jones (September 27, 1930 – May 2, 2007), also known as Charlie Jones, was an American politician. He served as a Democratic member of the Georgia House of Representatives.

== Life and career ==
Jones was born in Liberty County, Georgia. He attended Presbyterian College and the University of Georgia.

Jones served in the Georgia House of Representatives from 1961 to 1970.

Jones died on May 2, 2007, at the age of 76.
