= Robert A. Rowan =

American politician (1935–2021)

Member of the Georgia State Senate from the 8th district
- In office 1963–1974
- Succeeded by: Loyce W. Turner

Personal details
- Born: November 17, 1935 Enigma, Georgia, U.S.
- Died: August 10, 2021 (aged 85) Athens, Georgia, U.S.
- Party: Democratic
- Education: Abraham Baldwin Agricultural College; University of Georgia

Robert A. Rowan (November 17, 1935 – August 10, 2021), also known as Bobby Rowan, was an American politician. He served as a Democratic member for the 8th district of the Georgia State Senate.

== Life and career ==
Rowan was born in Enigma, Georgia. He attended Nashville High School, Abraham Baldwin Agricultural College and the University of Georgia.

Rowan served in the Georgia State Senate from 1963 to 1974, representing the 8th district.

Rowan died on August 10, 2021, in Athens, Georgia, at the age of 85.
