= James L. Conner =

American politician

Member of the Georgia House of Representatives
- In office 1959–1970

Personal details
- Born: June 20, 1927 Columbia County, Georgia, U.S.
- Died: July 24, 2005 (aged 78)
- Party: Democratic
- Education: Georgia Teachers College; University of Georgia

James L. Conner (June 20, 1927 – July 24, 2005) was an American politician. He served as a Democratic member of the Georgia House of Representatives.

== Life and career ==
Conner was born in Columbia County, Georgia. He attended Georgia Teachers College and the University of Georgia.

Conner served in the Georgia House of Representatives from 1959 to 1970.

Conner died on July 24, 2005, at the age of 78.
