= Curtis C. Herndon =

American politician

Member of the Georgia House of Representatives
- In office 1963–1966

Personal details
- Born: August 14, 1925 Appling County, Georgia, U.S.
- Died: April 22, 2009 (aged 83)
- Party: Democratic

Curtis C. Herndon (August 14, 1925 – April 22, 2009) was an American politician. He served as a Democratic member of the Georgia House of Representatives.

== Life and career ==
Herndon was born in Appling County, Georgia. He attended Surrency High School.

Herndon served in the Georgia House of Representatives from 1963 to 1966.

Herndon died on April 22, 2009, at the age of 83.
