= Marion T. Pope Jr. =

American judge and politician (born 1927)

Member of the Georgia House of Representatives
- In office 1963–1966

Judge of the Georgia Court of Appeals
- In office 1981–2002

Personal details
- Born: September 28, 1927 (age 99) Upson County, Georgia, U.S.
- Party: Democratic
- Education: South Georgia College; University of Georgia
- Occupation: Judge

Marion Thomas Pope Jr. (born September 28, 1927) is an American judge and politician. He served as a Democratic member of the Georgia House of Representatives.

== Life and career ==
Pope was born in Upson County, Georgia on September 28, 1927. He attended Canton High School, South Georgia College and the University of Georgia.

He served in the Georgia House of Representatives, representing Cherokee County from 1963 to 1966.

In 1981, Pope was appointed by Governor George Busbee to serve as a judge of the Georgia Court of Appeals, serving until 2002.
