= Howard H. Rainey =

American politician

Member of the Georgia House of Representatives
- In office 1961–1989
- Succeeded by: Johnny W. Floyd

Personal details
- Born: August 21, 1927 Crisp County, Georgia, U.S.
- Died: May 11, 2021 (aged 93)
- Party: Democratic
- Spouse: Mildred Edge
- Children: 2
- Education: Georgia Southwestern State University

Howard H. Rainey (August 21, 1927 – May 11, 2021) was an American politician. He served as a Democratic member of the Georgia House of Representatives.

== Life and career ==
Rainey was born in Crisp County, Georgia. He attended Cordele High School and Georgia Southwestern State University.

In 1961, Rainey was elected to the Georgia House of Representatives. He resigned in 1989 and was succeeded by Johnny W. Floyd.

Rainey died in May 2021, at the age of 93.
