= Jim L. Gillis Jr. =

American politician

Member of the Georgia Senate
- In office 1938–1938
- In office January 8, 1945 – January 5, 1947

Personal details
- Born: James Lester Gillis Jr. October 2, 1916 Locust Grove, Georgia, U.S.
- Died: February 26, 2018 (aged 101) Soperton, Georgia, U.S.
- Party: Democratic
- Relations: Hugh Gillis (brother); Jim L. Gillis Sr. (father); Neil L. Gillis (grandfather)
- Education: University of Georgia, 1937 (forestry)

James Lester Gillis Jr. (October 2, 1916 – February 26, 2018) was an American politician in the state of Georgia.

Gillis was born in Locust Grove to the prominent Gillis family of Soperton, Georgia. His grandfather, Neil L. Gillis, was the founder of Treutlen County, Georgia and a member of the Georgia House of Representatives. His father, Jim L. Gillis Sr., and brother, Hugh Gillis, were former members of the Georgia State Senate.

Gillis graduated from the University of Georgia in 1937 with a degree in forestry.

Gillis served on the Georgia Forestry Commission Board and was a former president of the American Turpentine Farmers Association, Georgia Forestry Commission, State Association of County Commissioners, Bank of Soperton, and Georgia Bankers Association. Gillis was a member of the board of directors at the Bank of Soperton from October 29, 1974, to September 28, 2016. He was a member of the Georgia Forestry Commission on February 14, 1977, until January 1, 2017 (being president from January 1981 to January 2007). He was the founder of the Ohoopee River Soil and Water Conservation District and a member of the National Association of Conservation Districts (NACD) Hall of Fame. He was a member of a conservation board for over 75 years, the longest term of any member ever. Gillis was the district supervisor of the Ohoopee River Soil Conservation District from 1939 to 2009.

He served in the Georgia State Senate in 1938 and from 1945 to 1946 and on the Treutlen County commission.

Gillis turned 100 in October 2016 and died in February 2018 at the age of 101, over 80 years since his first gubernatorial election.
