= Howard Overby =

American politician in Georgia (1915–1990)

Howard Thomas Overby (1915–1990) was an American lawyer, military officer, and politician.

Overby was born in Buford, Georgia, and primarily lived in Hall County. He was an officer in the United States Army during World War II, and commanded the United States Army National Guard unit in Gainesville. Overby's career as a lawyer spanned five decades, and he was also a member of the Georgia House of Representatives for ten years, followed by a sixteen-year tenure on the Georgia State Senate representing District 49.

Overby died on 9 June 1990, aged 75. In 2002, the National Guard armory in Gainesville was renamed the Howard T. Overby National Guard Armory.
