= Julian Webb =

American politician

Judge of the Georgia Court of Appeals
- In office 1974–1979

Member of the Georgia State Senate from the 11th district
- In office 1963–1974
- Succeeded by: Jimmy Hodge Timmons

President pro tempore of the Georgia State Senate
- In office 1967–1969
- Preceded by: Harry C. Jackson
- Succeeded by: Hugh Gillis

Personal details
- Born: Thomas Julian Webb; October 2, 1911 Byromville, Georgia, U.S.
- Died: October 29, 2002 (aged 91) St. Simons, Georgia, U.S.
- Party: Democratic
- Spouse: Jo Smith
- Education: Mercer University

Thomas Julian Webb (October 2, 1911 – October 29, 2002) was a member of the Georgia State Senate from 1963 to 1974. He was also a judge on the Georgia Court of Appeals from 1974 to 1979.

== Early life ==
Webb was born in Byromville, Georgia in Dooly County to Vester Otis and Flossie Irene Woodruff Webb. He graduated from Valdosta High School and then attended Mercer University where he was president of the Sigma Pi fraternity chapter and the Ciceronians debate and literature society. He graduated from Mercer with his A.B. degree in 1931 and his LL.B in 1932. In law school he was a member of Phi Alpha Delta law fraternity.

== Early career ==
After graduation Webb was admitted to the Georgia Bar in 1932. His first job was practising in Augusta, Georgia before taking a job with the legal staff of the Farm Credit Administration in Columbia, South Carolina in 1933. He would later be moved to Washington, D.C. where he stayed until 1942.

He married Jo Smith of Seminole County, Georgia on September 25, 1935, in Donalsonville. They had twin daughters, Joanna and Julianna.

Webb moved back to Donalsonville in 1943 and opened his practice. During this time he was approved to serve before the U.S. Supreme Court. He served as the city's attorney from 1945 to 1974. He was the county attorney from 1971 to 1974. He practiced for many years in the cities of Valdosta, Augusta, and Donalsonville. He would serve as president of the City Attorneys of Georgia in 1966-1967 and on the Georgia Disciplinary Board from 1964 to 1967.

== Georgia Senate ==
In 1963, Webb was elected to the Georgia Senate as a Democrat. During his time in the Senate he served as Assistant Floor Leader in 1963 and Floor Leader in 1964. He was President Pro Tem from 1967 to 1969. He served on the Georgia Constitution Revision Commission in 1963 and 1969, the Governor's Judicial Processes Commission from 1971 to 1973, the Criminal Law Study Commission from 1972 to 1974. He left the Senate in 1974.

Arthur K. Bolton, the former Attorney General of Georgia, credited Webb with being "very instrumental in securing passage of the present Appellate Court Retirement System of Georgia, and this did as much to strengthen our appellate judicial system in Georgia as anything done in recent history."

== Georgia Court of Appeals ==
In 1974 he was appointed by Governor Jimmy Carter to the Georgia Court of Appeals. He was elected to the position later that year. While on the court, he was appointed to the Governor's Commission on Court Organization and Structure in 1975. He was also a member of the National Council of State Court Representatives from 1975 to 1978 and chairman of the Judicial Council of Georgia from 1978 to 1979. He resigned from the court in 1979 after serving as the presiding judge.

== Legal career after retirement ==
In 1981, he served as the judge (pro bono) of the Juvenile Court of Seminole County, He also served as county attorney during 1985.

== Religion ==
Webb was a lifelong Methodist and volunteered for the church in several capacities. At the local level, he was a men's Sunday School teacher for over forty-five years, and chairman of the Thomasville District Trustees and the Magnolia Manor retirement home board of trustees. Regionally, he was president of the Georgia Investment Corporation of the Methodist Church and a member of the Church Court of Appeals of the Southeastern Jurisdictional Conference. He attended many conferences including the World Methodist Council in London in 1966.

== Other interests ==
Webb owned the Donalsonville News newspaper and the Seminole Drug Company for several years. He was engaged in farming and was a member of the board of directors of Chattahoochee Industrial Railroad. He served as president and deputy district governor for the Lions Club, and was director of the Chamber of Commerce.

He was a delegate to the World Peace through Law Conference in Geneva, Switzerland, in 1967 and in Washington, D.C., in 1975.

Webb was a member of these legal societies: the Atlanta Lawyers Club, the Georgia Bar Foundation, the American Bar Foundation, the American Judicature Society, and the American Law Institute. He was also a member of the Masonic Lodge, the Royal Arch Masons, the Knights Templar, the Scottish Rite Temple, the Hasan Shrine Temple, and the Royal Order of Jesters.

In 1984, his wife published her own book, Linkage: the study of a family, on the history of the Webb family.

== Awards ==
Webb was named Citizen of the Year in 1984 for Donalsonville. He received an honorary Doctorate of Law from Mercer in 1988. He was named outstanding Alumnus of the Walter F. George School of Law in 1997.

== Retirement ==
Webb eventually moved to St. Simon Island where he died a couple of months after his wife.
