= A. Perry Gordy =

American politician (1912–1983)

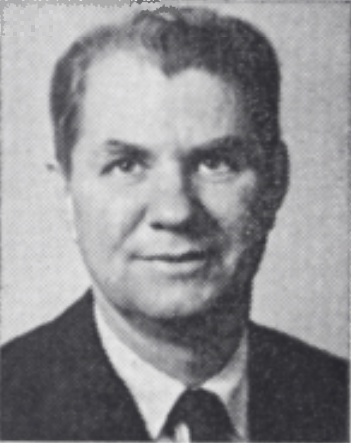
- Official portrait, circa 1965

Member of the Georgia Senate from the 15th district
- In office January 14, 1963 – May 17, 1965
- Preceded by: John C. Peterson
- Succeeded by: Ivey William Gregory Jr.

Personal details
- Born: December 16, 1912 Columbus, Georgia, U.S.
- Died: May 7, 1983 (aged 70) Columbus, Georgia, U.S.
- Party: Republican
- Spouse: Martha Louisa Trimble (m. 1948)
- Children: 3
- Relatives: Lillian Gordy Carter (first cousin); Jimmy Carter (first cousin once removed); Jason Carter (first cousin three times removed)
- Education: Alabama Polytechnic Institute; University of Georgia

Military service
- Branch/service: United States Navy
- Battles/wars: World War II

Arthur Perry Gordy Jr. (December 16, 1912 – May 7, 1983) was an American businessman and politician from Georgia. He served in the Georgia State Senate as a Republican from 1963 to 1967. He is notable for being the first Republican elected from Muscogee in the history of the state.

== Early life ==
Gordy was born on December 16, 1912, in Columbus, Georgia, to Arthur Perry Gordy Sr., a dentist and orthodontist, and Edna Adele (Spencer) Gordy. He graduated from Columbus High School in 1929. In 1936, he graduated from Alabama Polytechnic Institute with a BS degree in engineering. He earned his master's degree in education from the University of Georgia. He served in World War II from July 1942 to December 1945 in the United States Navy Reserve.

== Political career ==
In 1962, he was elected to Georgia's 15th Senate district and won. While state senator, he supported legislation that would have consolidated Georgia's small counties. He was the first Republican in the history of the state to be elected from Muscogee. In May 1965, he was named director of the Columbus Area Vocational Technical School, and resigned from his senate seat.

== Personal life ==
He married his wife Martha Louisa Trimble, on February 1, 1948. Together they had three children. He died on May 7, 1983, in Columbus. Through his paternal grandfather, he was first cousins with Lillian Gordy Carter, the mother of former U.S. President Jimmy Carter.
