= 2009 Atlanta elections =

A municipal election in the City of Atlanta was held on Tuesday, November 3, 2009. Atlanta is the capital of the state of Georgia and is the largest city in Georgia and is the center of the Atlanta metropolitan area, the largest metropolitan area in the South.

Voters filled the offices of mayor of Atlanta, members of the Atlanta City Council and members of the Atlanta Board of Education, for terms commencing January 2010 and ending January 2014. Voters also voted in retention elections on a number of Municipal Court judges. The election was non-partisan, meaning that political party affiliations did not appear on the ballot.

== Mayor ==
2009 Atlanta mayoral election
- November 3 and December 1, 2009
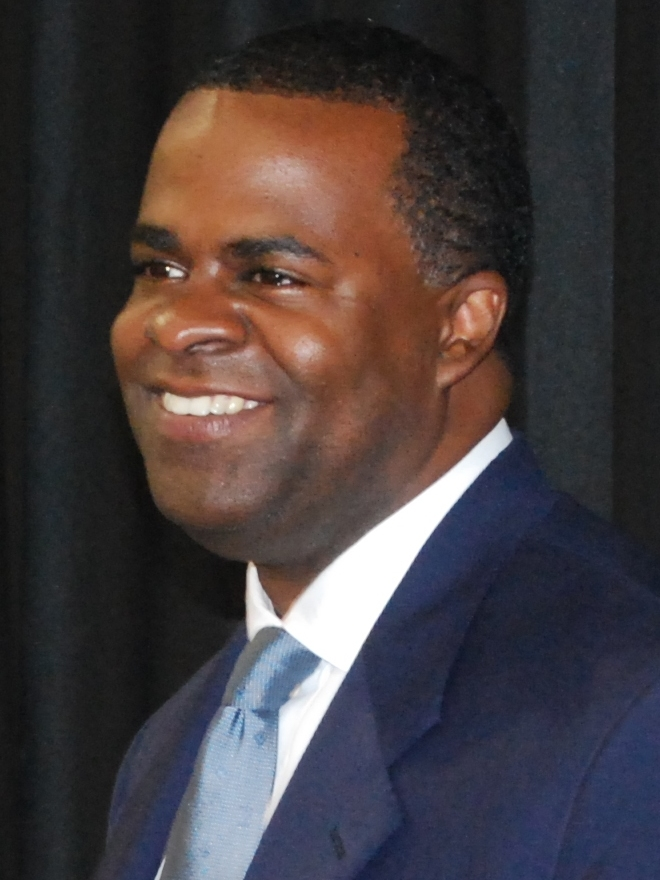

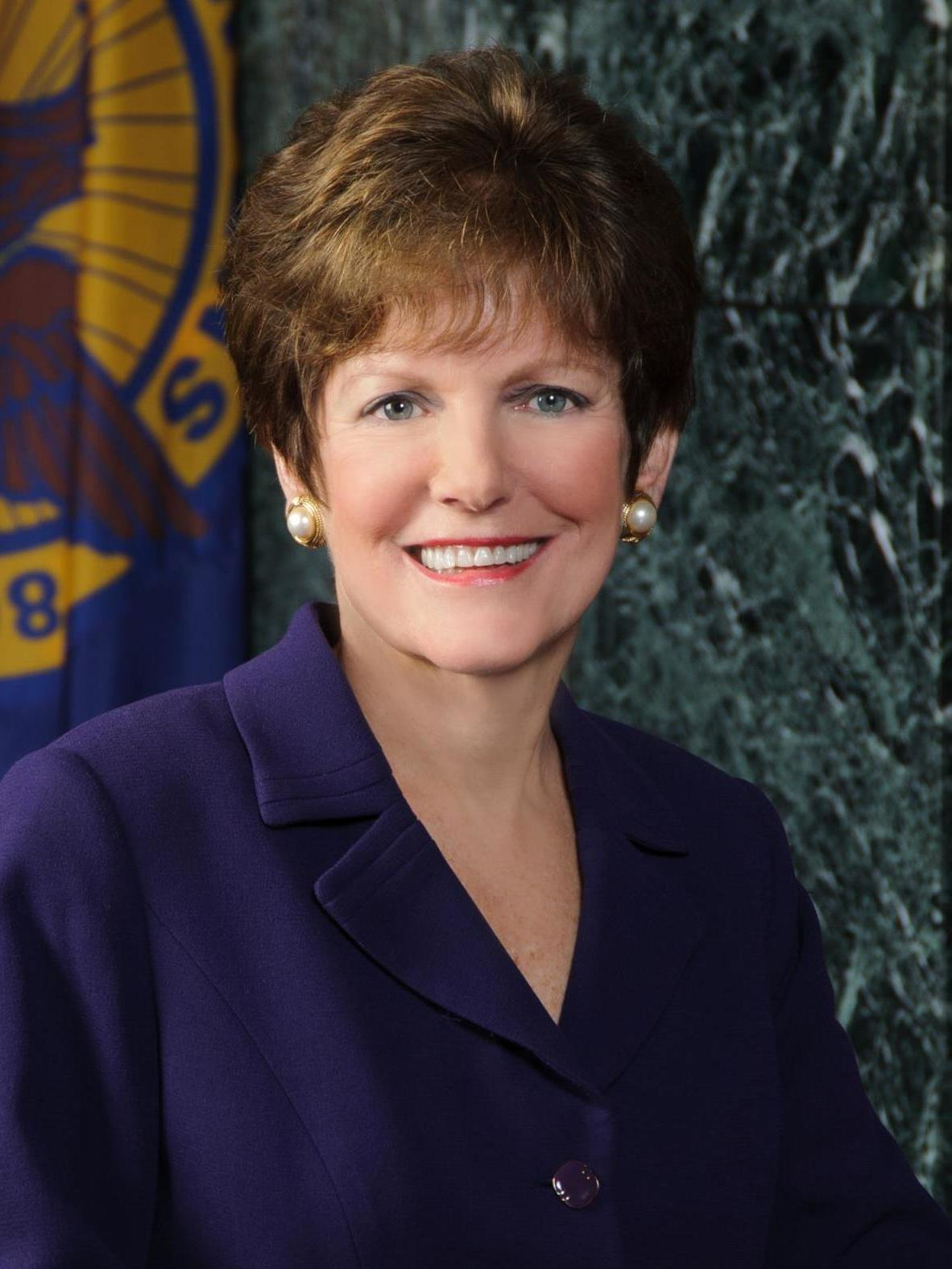

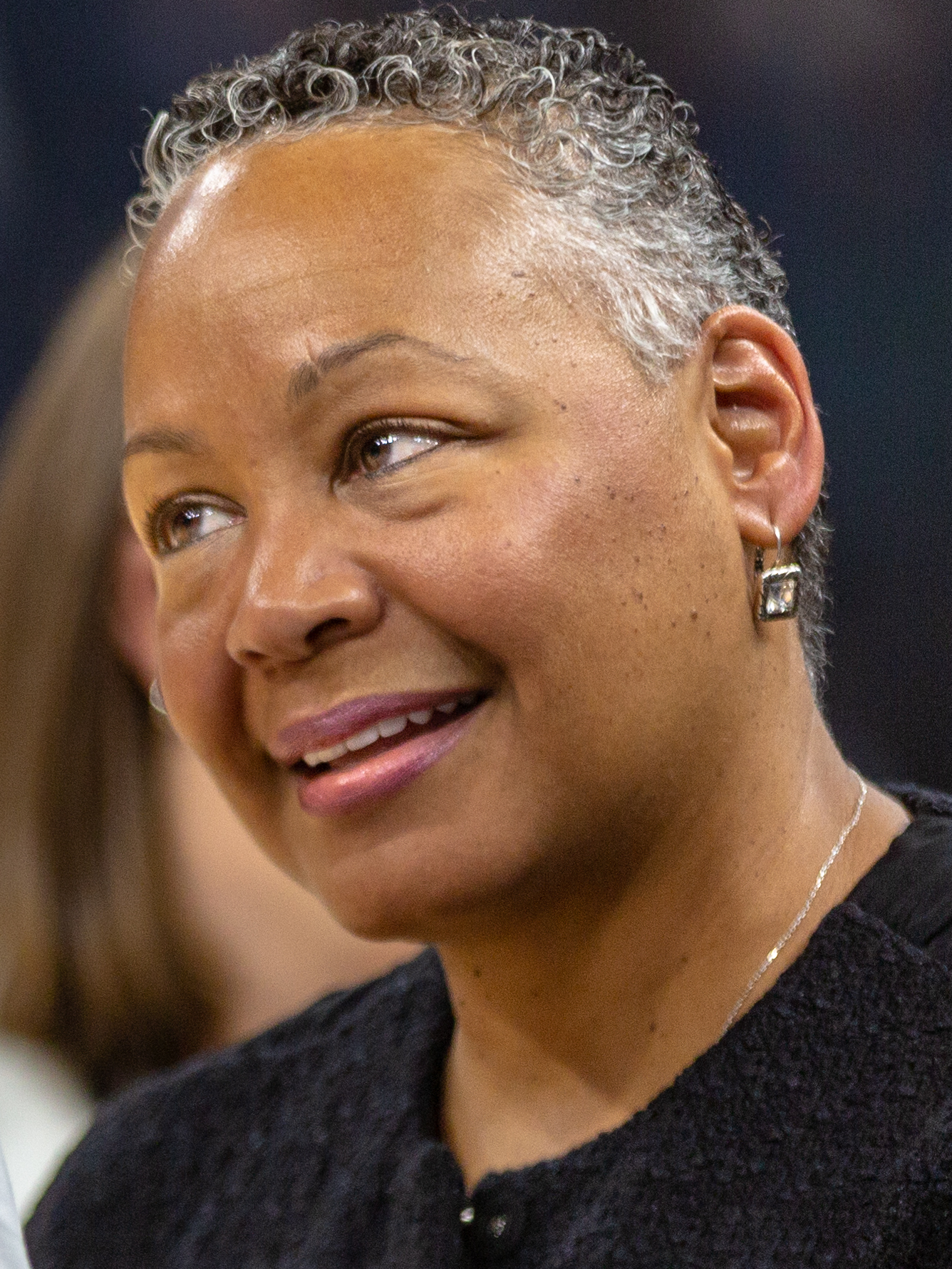
Candidate	Kasim Reed	Mary Norwood	Lisa Borders
Party	Nonpartisan	Nonpartisan	Nonpartisan
First-round vote	28,640	36,091	11,389
First-round percentage	36.35%	45.81%	14.46%
Second-round vote	42,549	41,835
Second-round percentage	50.42%	49.58%
Mayor before election
Shirley Franklin
Democratic
Elected mayor
Kasim Reed
Democratic

The mayor is the city's chief executive officer and head of the executive branch, which carries out the laws that have been instituted by the council. The mayor is responsible for the day-to-day operations of city government.

Incumbent mayor Shirley Franklin was prevented by term limits from running for another term in 2009.

The four leading mayoral candidates, based on standing in polls, took part in a final debate sponsored by the Atlanta Journal-Constitution and WSB-TV were City Council President Lisa Borders, City Councilwoman Mary Norwood, state Senator Kasim Reed, and attorney Jesse Spikes. Minor candidates included Peter Brownlowe, Kyle Keyser, and write-in candidates. Previously on October 14, 2009, Emory University sponsored a debate which included the six front running candidates.

Mary Norwood received the most votes in the November election but did not win a majority. Therefore, she and Kasim Reed, who placed second, advanced to a runoff, which Reed won.

=== Results ===
==== First round ====
Atlanta mayoral election, 2009 (first-round)
Party	Candidate	Votes	%
Nonpartisan	Mary Norwood	36,091	45.81%
Nonpartisan	Kasim Reed	28,640	36.35%
Nonpartisan	Lisa Borders	11,389	14.46%
Nonpartisan	Jesse Spikes	1,943	2.47%
Nonpartisan	Kyle Keyser	579	0.74%
Nonpartisan	Peter Brownlowe	101	0.12%
Nonpartisan	Write-in	67	0.09%
Total votes		78,790	100%

==== Runoff ====
Atlanta mayoral election, 2009 (runoff)
Party	Candidate	Votes	%
Nonpartisan	Kasim Reed	42,549	50.42%
Nonpartisan	Mary Norwood	41,835	49.58%
Total votes		84,383	100%

== City Council members and president of the City Council ==
The city council has fifteen members. The council's role is to advise the mayor and pass local ordinances. Twelve are elected in single-member districts by area, while three are elected at-large from one-third (four) of the 12 voting districts (referred to as "posts").

The President of the Council is elected from the city at-large and is the presiding officer of the Council, acting as chair of all Council meetings. The President of the Council votes on the Council only in case of a tie. The President of the Council appoints chairs and members of the various committees, subject to rejection by a majority of the council and also acts as acting mayor (exercising all powers and discharging all duties of the mayor) in case of a vacancy in that office or during the disability of the mayor.

== Board of education ==
The Atlanta Board of Education establishes and approves the policies that govern the Atlanta Public Schools. The board consists of nine members, representing six geographical districts and three "at-large" districts. One person is elected per district to represent the schools in a given district for a four-year term.

== City of Atlanta Municipal Court judges ==
The following current City of Atlanta Municipal Court judges were on the November 3, 2009 ballots for either dismissal or retention:

- Deborah S. Greene (chief judge)
- Howard R. Johnson
- Clinton E. Deveaux
- Andrew A. Mickle
- Barbara A. Harris
- Catherine E. Malicki
- Elaine L. Carlisle
- Herman L. Sloan
- Calvin S. Graves
- Gary E. Jackson
- Crystal A. Gaines

All the judges were retained.
