= Joseph Tribble =

American politician (1920–2003)

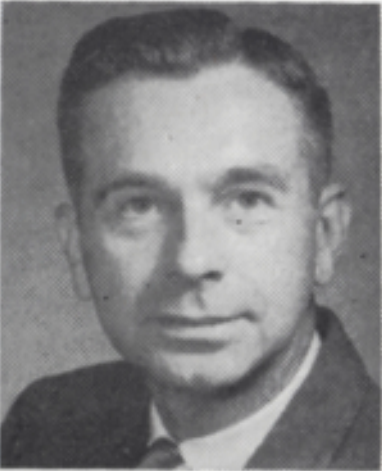

Member of the Georgia Senate from the 3rd district
- In office January 14, 1963 – January 9, 1967
- Preceded by: W. C. Long
- Succeeded by: Bart E. Shea

Chair of the Georgia Republican Party
- In office May 2, 1964 – May 29, 1965
- Preceded by: James W. Dorsey
- Succeeded by: G. Paul Jones

Personal details
- Born: August 30, 1920 Forsyth, Georgia, U.S.
- Died: July 15, 2003 (aged 82)
- Party: Democratic (until 1960); Republican (from 1960)
- Spouse: Laura Boddiford (m. 1948; died 2018)
- Children: 4

Joseph James Tribble (August 30, 1920 – July 15, 2003) was an American politician who served in the Georgia State Senate. Tribble is notable for being one of the first Republicans elected from Chatham County in the 20th century.

== Early life ==
Tribble was born on August 30, 1920, in Forsyth, Georgia. Tribble completed his education at the Georgia Institute of Technology, receiving a Bachelor of Science in Mechanical Engineering in 1942.

During World War II, from August 1943 to June 1946, he served as an engineer in the engine rooms aboard Liberty ships of the United States Maritime Service.

== Political career ==
After the war, Tribble settled in Savannah in 1946 and began his career at Union Camp Corporation. Over the years, he held various management positions and retired from Union Camp in 1981 as the Energy Coordinator for the Unbleached Division.

Throughout his life in Savannah, Tribble actively engaged in politics. He was originally a Democrat, but switched parties when John F. Kennedy was nominated. He achieved the distinction of being the first Republican State Senator elected from Chatham County in the 20th century. His political involvement led to numerous chairmanships and delegate responsibilities. In 1963, he was Chairman of the Georgia National Draft Goldwater Committee. On May 2, 1964, Tribble was elected chairman of the Georgia Republican Party and served until he resigned on May 29, 1965. He served as a delegate to the 1964, 1968, 1976, and 1980 Republican National Conventions. In 1968, he ran for Congress in Georgia's 1st congressional district, where G. Elliott Hagan defeated him 68.2%–31.8% (77,403) to (36,118).

In May 1981, Tribble reached a pinnacle in his career when President Ronald Reagan appointed him as an Assistant Secretary of Energy.

== Personal life ==
On November 25, 1948, he married Laura Boddiford, and together they raised four children. He died on July 15, 2003, aged 82.
