= Ben F. Johnson =

American politician and educator

Benjamin Franklin Johnson, Jr. (September 30, 1914 – July 1, 2006) was a member of the Georgia State Senate from 1962 to 1969, Dean of the Emory University School of Law from 1961 to 1973, and Dean of the Georgia State University College of Law from 1981 to 1985. He served as a Deputy Attorney General for Georgia from 1955 to 1961.

== Early life ==
Johnson was the son of J.D. and Jimmie Johnson. He was born in Carroll County, Georgia but grew up in Atlanta. He graduated from Atlanta Boys High School in 1932. He began attending attended Emory University on a scholarship but that ended with the start of the Great Depression. With the loss of the scholarship he transferred to what was then known as the Georgia Institute of Technology's Evening School of Commerce before graduating from the University of Georgia in 1937. While attending Emory he became a member of Sigma Pi fraternity. He was accepted into Harvard Law School but chose to stay near home and attend Emory Law School because of his father's poor health. During law school, he became a member of Phi Delta Phi legal honor society and started a Big Brother mentoring program pairing first year law students with older students. The program had the backing of the Emory administration. In 1939 he received his J.D. degree and finished first in his class. He began practicing law in Atlanta after graduation. That year he also married his wife, Stella Darnell. They had two sons, Ben F. Johnson III and Sherman D. Johnson.

== Early career ==
In 1943, Johnson enlisted in the U.S. Navy where he served as a naval intelligence officer in the Pacific during World War II. After the war, Johnson received his LL.D. degree from the Duke University School of Law. In 1949 he became a faculty member of Emory Law School. He served as Deputy Attorney General for the State of Georgia from 1955 to 1961 where he appeared in over thirty cases in front of the Supreme Court of Georgia. He also argued tax cases in front of the United States Supreme Court. During this time he served on a congressional advisory committee to study taxation of interstate commerce.

== Georgia Senate ==
In 1962 he was elected to the Georgia State Senate from DeKalb County and served there until 1969. During that time he was chair of the Banking and Finance committee, vice chair of the Judiciary committee, secretary of the Committee on Reorganization and Efficiency in Government, and a member of the Appropriations committee. From 1963 to 1964 he served on the state's Constitutional Revision Commission. As a senator, his largest accomplishment was writing the constitutional amendment that permitted the creation of the Metropolitan Atlanta Rapid Transit Authority (MARTA).

== Dean of Emory University School of Law ==
=== Integration ===
Johnson was named the fourth Dean of the Emory Law School in 1961. In 1962 he served as co-counsel with Henry Bowden (Emory Law School's Chairman of the Board of Trustees) for the school's lawsuit to permit racial integration. The case of Emory University v. Nash, successfully challenged Georgia's law that denied state tax exemptions to integrated private schools. The result opened the way for Emory and other private schools to admit minorities without imperiling their tax-exempt status.

From 1966 to 1972 Emory Law School ran a program called Pre-Start. The program was an affirmative action program that focused on Johnson's integration initiative for the school.

=== Educational philosophy ===
Johnson was focused on educational opportunities for those who were not wealthy or whose family circumstances did not allow for a full-time college attendance. As someone who had worked his way through college during the Great Depression, he earned an early appreciation for flexible, part-time education.

In 1967, Johnson opened the Emory Community Legal Services Center to provide a neighborhood law office staffed by supervised law students. Aside from providing legal services for the poor, the center drafted legislation, carried out test cases, and recruited students who were interested in providing legal services to the poor.

In the early 1970s, Johnson was forced to close the part-time student program at Emory Law School which some thought was needed to enhance the reputation of the school. This was a step Johnson knew would hurt many part-time students. He stepped down from the dean's position in 1973 and re-entered the classroom as a teacher until 1981. During his tenure as dean, the enrollment and budget of the school grew by five times what it had been when he took the position.

As a teacher, he was known to be competent in both the academic and practical aspects of the law.

== Dean of the Georgia State University College of Law ==
In 1981, Johnson was invited by Georgia State University President Noah Langdale and Vice President William Suttles to become the founding dean of the university's new law school. All three knew that a law school at GSU would make possible the return of part-time legal education to the Atlanta area. Johnson served as dean from 1981 to 1985. When he retired he had recruited faculty, admitted the first students, and secured provisional accreditation from the American Bar Association. The school began offering its first classes in the fall of 1982.

== Other activities ==
Johnson was active in the Southern Baptist Druid Hills Baptist Church where he was a Sunday School teacher for fifty years. He was also a Rotarian.
