= Enigma, Georgia =

- Town
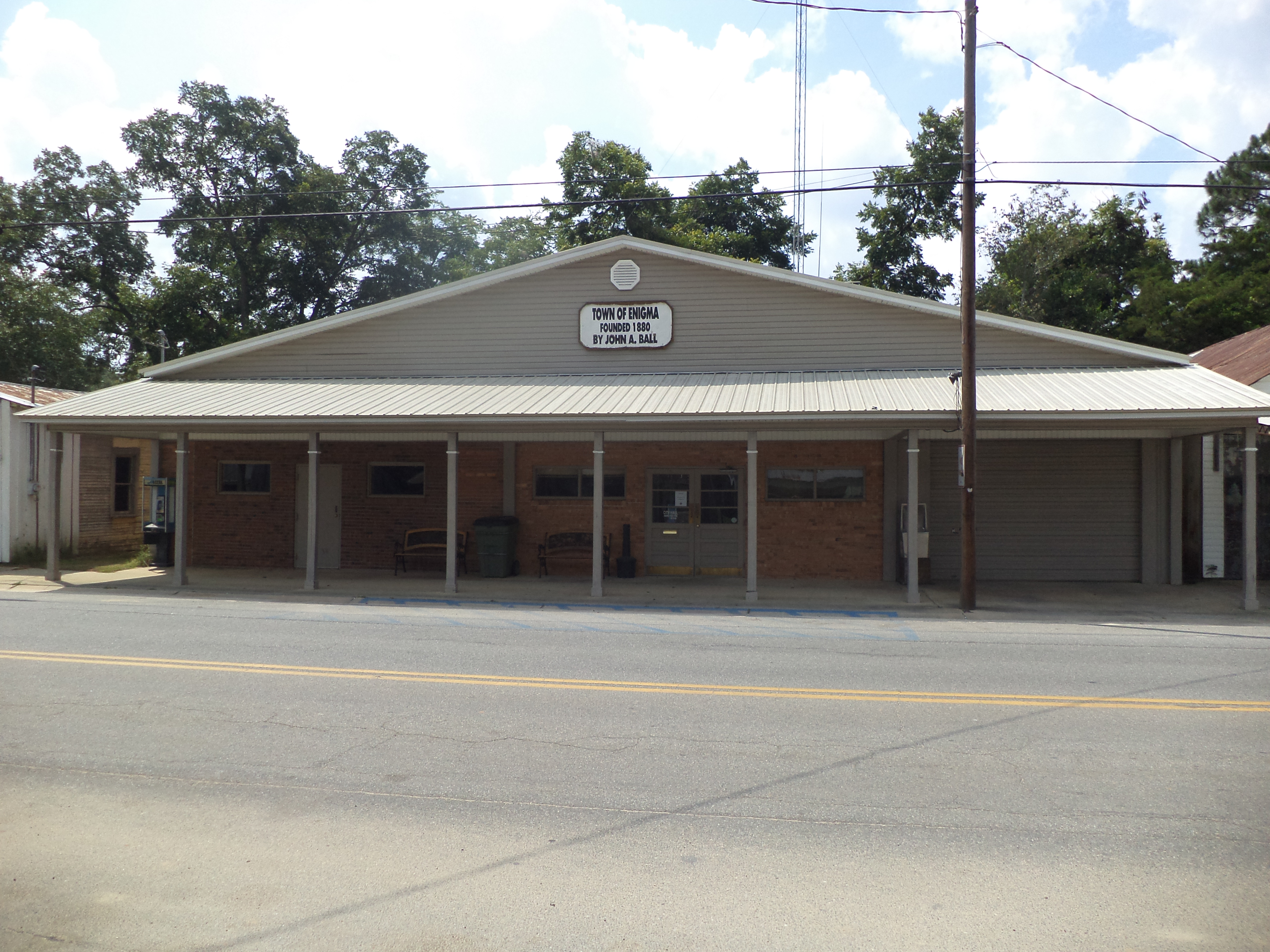
- Enigma City Hall

- Location in Berrien County and the state of Georgia
- Coordinates: 31°24′41″N 83°19′52″W
- Country: United States
- State: Georgia
- County: Berrien

Area
  - Total: 3.28 sq mi (8.50 km^{2})
  - Land: 3.25 sq mi (8.42 km^{2})
  - Water: 0.031 sq mi (0.08 km^{2})
- Elevation: 305 ft (93 m)

Population (2020)
  - Total: 1,058
  - Density: 325.3/sq mi (125.58/km^{2})
- Time zone: UTC-5 (Eastern (EST))
  - Summer (DST): UTC-4 (EDT)
- ZIP code: 31749
- Area code: 229
- FIPS code: 13-27596
- GNIS feature ID: 0313955

Enigma is a town in Berrien County, Georgia, United States. The population was 1,278 at the 2010 census, and 1,058 in 2020. Enigma has frequently been noted on lists of unusual place names.

== History ==
Enigma is a small town in South Georgia located in the northwest tip of Berrien County, 9 miles (14 km) east of Tifton, on U.S. Highway 82. The town was founded between 1876 and 1880 by John A. Ball. It was not initially named "Enigma". Originally a settlement, it was commonly referred to as "Gunn and Weston" until Ball decided he wanted a real name for this town. Two names, "Lax" and "Enigma", were proposed to state officials for review. Lax was already taken by another nearby settlement, and so "Enigma" became the official name. Enigma is an odd name for a town; by definition it means a puzzle or mystery. Ball said, "It was a puzzle what to name it anyway." The town was incorporated on August 21, 1906.

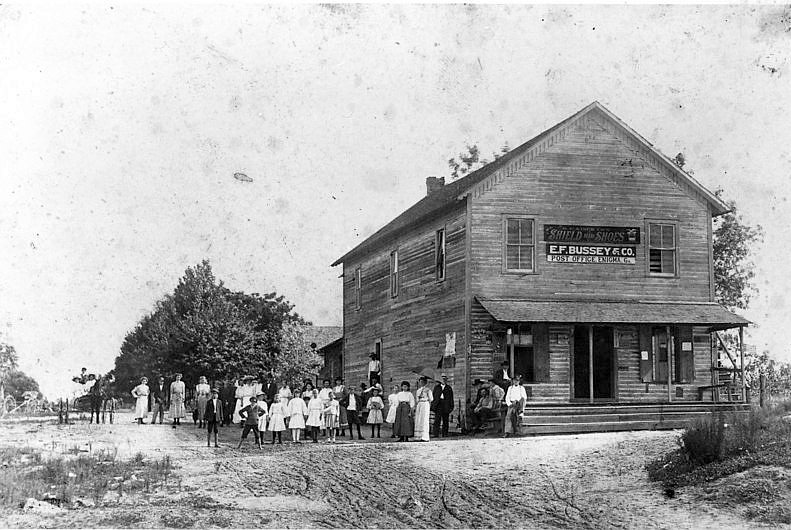
Enigma, circa 1900

Ball and his family originated in Raleigh, North Carolina, traveling to Georgia on the Brunswick and Western Railroad. He became the town's first postmaster, and not long afterward, Capt J.B. Gunn from Terrell County, Georgia, came as an assistant. Ball and his son Jim started a turpentine business around 1878. Ball returned to Raleigh to bring back a man named Tubb Daughtry and his family to help run the business. He gave them land to live on and permission to worship as they pleased. The turpentine business soon dwindled, and lumber became the main focus. Capt. J. B. Gunn and Capt. S. R. Weston built a sawmill two miles east of Enigma. H. F. Stewart came to work in the sawmill.

Other businesses opened in Enigma throughout the years, including a grocery, merchandise, and hardware stores. E.F. Bussey set up a merchandise store in a building owned at one time by Gunn. This building also housed the U.S. Post Office and sold coffins on its second story. It was located on the south side of the railroad. The railroad's closest depot was in Brookfield, 4 miles (6 km) away. Enigma had a doctor's office run by G.R. Parker. There have been three banks in Enigma throughout the years. Two banks were started around 1915 to 1917, and the other one was started in 1973. The People's Bank opened in 1915 and closed in 1916, and the Ambrose-Enigma Banking Company opened on June 5, 1917, and closed around 1920. The Bank of Alapaha opened a branch in Enigma on March 1, 1973, and is still in business.

== Geography ==
According to the United States Census Bureau, the town has a total area of 3.3 square miles (8.5 km^{2}), of which 3.2 square miles (8.3 km^{2}) is land and 0.04 square miles (0.10 km^{2}), or 1.14%, is water.

== Demographics ==
Historical population
Census	Pop.	Note	%±
1910	338		—
1920	340		0.6%
1930	360		5.9%
1940	529		46.9%
1950	499		−5.7%
1960	525		5.2%
1970	505		−3.8%
1980	574		13.7%
1990	611		6.4%
2000	869		42.2%
2010	1,278		47.1%
2020	1,058		−17.2%
U.S. Decennial Census

=== 2020 census ===
As of the 2020 census, Enigma had a population of 1,058. The median age was 33.4 years. 29.6% of residents were under the age of 18 and 14.7% of residents were 65 years of age or older. For every 100 females there were 110.3 males, and for every 100 females age 18 and over there were 101.9 males age 18 and over.

0.0% of residents lived in urban areas, while 100.0% lived in rural areas.

There were 397 households in Enigma, of which 39.0% had children under the age of 18 living in them. Of all households, 37.3% were married-couple households, 21.9% were households with a male householder and no spouse or partner present, and 28.5% were households with a female householder and no spouse or partner present. About 24.9% of all households were made up of individuals and 11.0% had someone living alone who was 65 years of age or older.

There were 455 housing units, of which 12.7% were vacant. The homeowner vacancy rate was 0.0% and the rental vacancy rate was 6.1%.

Racial composition as of the 2020 census
Race	Number	Percent
White	733	69.3%
Black or African American	94	8.9%
American Indian and Alaska Native	1	0.1%
Asian	6	0.6%
Native Hawaiian and Other Pacific Islander	2	0.2%
Some other race	103	9.7%
Two or more races	119	11.2%
Hispanic or Latino (of any race)	204	19.3%

=== 2000 census ===
As of the census of 2000, there were 869 people, 313 households, and 231 families residing in the town.

== Education ==
The Enigma school was located on the north side of town. It started as a one-room school house, then moved to a three-room school house. A large brick building was built in 1926 to serve as a new school, also on the north side, just across from Highway 82. In the fall of 1954 all county high schools were consolidated into Berrien High in Nashville, the county seat. The original Enigma school building was still in use as part of the elementary school when it burned in October 1973. The gymnasium and cafeteria were still standing, and portable classrooms were brought in so the school could continue until it was rebuilt. Enigma Elementary School was never rebuilt, and the mobile units continued serving the school until it closed at the end of the 1987–88 school year. Enigma Elementary merged with West Berrien Elementary School starting with the 1988–89 school year. The new Northwest Elementary School was housed on the old West Berrien campus. Northwest Elementary School was closed in 1994 in the final consolidation of schools in the county. Now all children are bussed to Berrien County Schools in Nashville: Berrien Primary, Berrien Elementary, Berrien Middle, and Berrien High. The Enigma School grounds now serve as the Enigma City Park.
