= Harry C. Jackson =

American politician (1915–2000)

Mayor of Columbus, Georgia
- In office 1979–1983
- Preceded by: Jack P. Mickle
- Succeeded by: J. W. Feighner

Member of the Georgia State Senate
- In office January 9, 1961 – January 13, 1975
- Preceded by: Eldridge W. Perry
- Succeeded by: H. Norwood Pearce
- Constituency: 24th district (1961–1963); 16th district (1963–1973)

President pro tempore of the Georgia State Senate
- In office January 14, 1963 – January 9, 1967
- Preceded by: Carl Sanders
- Succeeded by: Julian Webb

Personal details
- Born: Harry Cook Jackson; July 23, 1915 Columbus, Georgia, U.S.
- Died: February 12, 2000 (aged 84)
- Party: Democratic
- Education: Auburn University (BS)
- Occupation: Politician; lawyer

Harry Cook Jackson (July 23, 1915 – February 12, 2000) was an American politician, a member of the Democratic Party.

== Life and career ==
Jackson was born on July 23, 1915, in Columbus, Georgia. He graduated from Auburn University and received a Bachelor of Science degree in Mechanical Engineering. After graduation he began working as an engineer. In 1952, he became a lawyer.

From 1961 to 1975, he was a member of the Senate of Georgia. During this time, he held the post of president pro tempore for two terms.

In 1974, he ran unsuccessfully for a nomination for the Democratic candidate in the Georgia gubernatorial election. In August 1978, he won the Democratic primary for the Columbus, Georgia mayoral election over incumbent Jack P. Mickle, who had sought the nomination for a second four-year term. Jackson won the next mayoral election and held the office from 1979 to 1982. He was from 1985 a member of the board of directors of the Georgia Ports Authority, and was elected in September 1994 as its chairman.
