= Georgia's 3rd Senate district =

American legislative district

Georgia's 3rd State Senate district
Senator
Mike Hodges; R–Brunswick
- Demographics: 66.23% White; 20.92% Black; 6.82% Hispanic; 1.22% Asian; 0.26% Native American; 0.09% Hawaiian/Pacific Islander; 0.42% Other; 5.19% Multiracial
- Population (2020) • Voting age: 191,212; 148,915

District 3 of the Georgia Senate is a senatorial district in Southeast Georgia that covers most of Coastal Georgia south of Savannah.

The district is anchored in Brunswick and includes all of Brantley, Camden, Charlton, Glynn, and McIntosh counties, as well as part of Ware County including part of Waycross. This area encompasses Cumberland Island, the Golden Isles, Kings Bay, and part of the Okefenokee Swamp.

The current senator is Mike Hodges, a Republican from Brunswick first elected in 2022.

== District officeholders ==
Years	Senator, District 3	Counties in district
1963–1964	Joseph Tribble (R)	
1965–1966	Joseph Tribble (R)	
2011–2012	William Ligon (R)	
2013–2014	William Ligon (R)	
2015–2016	William Ligon (R)	
2017–2018	William Ligon (R)	
2019–2020	William Ligon (R)	
2021–2022	Sheila McNeill (R)	
2023–2024	Mike Hodges (R)	
2025–2026	Mike Hodges (R)	
