= Georgia's 15th Senate district =

American legislative district

Georgia's 15th State Senate district
Senator
Ed Harbison; D–Columbus
- Demographics: 34.07% White; 52.31% Black; 7.57% Hispanic; 1.31% Asian; 0.23% Native American; 0.27% Hawaiian/Pacific Islander; 0.44% Other; 4.97% Multiracial
- Population (2020) • Voting age: 189,446; 144,506

District 15 of the Georgia Senate is a district located in West and Southwest Georgia, anchored in Columbus.

The district includes most of Columbus-Muscogee County as well as all of Chattahoochee, Macon, Marion, Schley, Talbot, and Taylor counties. The district includes Fort Benning.

The current senator is Ed Harbison, a Democrat from Columbus first elected in 1992.

== List of state senators ==
Senator	Tenure	Party	Counties	Notes	Ref
William H. Crawford	1845		Lee, Sumter		
William A. Maxwell	1847		Lee, Sumter		
Jared Tomlinson	1849–1850		Lee, Sumter		
Addison E. Harris	1851–1852		Lee		
John McRae (Sr of Appling)	1861–1863		Irwin, Montgomery, Telfair		
D. M. McRae	1863–1865		Irwin, Montgomery, Telfair		
T. L. Wilcox	1865–1866		Irwin, Montgomery, Telfair		
Walter T. McArthur	1868–1869		Irwin, Montgomery, Telfair		
D. W. Cameron	1871–1874		Irwin, Montgomery, Telfair		
T. D. Wilcox	1875–1877; 1882–1883		Irwin, Montgomery, Telfair		
Jacob C. Clements	1878–1879		Irwin, Montgomery, Telfair		
Jesse M. Wall	1879		Irwin, Montgomery, Telfair		
Thomas Jefferson Smith	1880–1881		Irwin, Montgomery, Telfair		
Allen McArthur	1884–1885		Irwin, Montgomery, Telfair		
John D. McLeod	1886–1887		Irwin, Montgomery, Telfair		
Manasseh Henderson	1888–1889		Irwin, Montgomery, Telfair		
John McRae (Jr of Irwin?)	1890–1891		Irwin, Montgomery, Telfair		
T. J. Smith	1892–1893		Irwin, Montgomery, Telfair		
George K. Wilcox	1894–1895		Irwin, Montgomery, Telfair		
John A. Wooten	1896–1897		Irwin, Montgomery, Telfair		
Eli K. Wilcox	1898–1899		Irwin, Montgomery, Telfair		
B. E. Wilcox	1900–1901		Irwin, Montgomery, Telfair		
Gabriel M. Clements	1902–1904		Irwin, Montgomery, Telfair		
George M. Wilcox	1905–1906		Irwin, Montgomery, Telfair		
James Andrew Jackson Henderson	1907–1908		Ben Hill, Dodge, Irwin, Montgomery, Telfair		
Marcus B. Calhoun	1909–1910		Ben Hill, Dodge, Irwin, Montgomery, Telfair		
W. S. Mann	1911–1912		Ben Hill, Dodge, Irwin, Montgomery, Telfair, Wheeler		
O. H. Elkins	1913–1914		Ben Hill, Dodge, Irwin, Montgomery, Telfair, Wheeler		
M. J. Paulk	1915–1917				
David Roscoe Peacock	1917				
C. H. Peacock	1918		Ben Hill, Dodge, Irwin, Montgomery, Telfair, Webster		
John C. Calhoun	1919–1920		Montgomery, Toombs, Wheeler		
D. C. Colson	1921–1922		Montgomery, Toombs, Wheeler		
George W. Lankford	1923–1924; 1929–1931		Montgomery, Toombs, Wheeler		
John Martin Dasher McGregor	1925–1926		Montgomery, Toombs, Wheeler		
Reese Frederick Jordan	1927; 1939–1940		Montgomery, Toombs, Wheeler		
Hugh Peterson Jr.	1931		Montgomery, Toombs, Wheeler		
Robert Ernest Rivers	1933		Montgomery, Toombs, Wheeler		
James Ellis Pope	1935		Montgomery, Toombs, Wheeler		
William James Peterson	1937–1938; 1943–1944		Montgomery, Toombs, Wheeler		
Austus Led Mosley	1941–1942		Montgomery, Toombs, Wheeler		
Guy Orlando Stone	1945–1946		Montgomery, Toombs, Wheeler		
James F. Darby Sr.	1947–1948		Montgomery, Toombs, Wheeler	Died in office	
John C. Peterson	1949–1950; 1961–1962		Montgomery, Toombs, Wheeler		
Wallace Adams	1951–1952		Montgomery, Toombs, Wheeler		
Steve M. Hall	1953–1955		Montgomery, Toombs, Wheeler		
Walter B. Morrison	1955–1956		Montgomery, Toombs, Wheeler		
Wallace Adams	1957–1958		Montgomery, Toombs, Wheeler		
James F. Darby Jr.	1948, 1959–1960		Montgomery, Toombs, Wheeler		
A. Perry Gordy II	1963–1965	Republican	Muscogee	Resigned	
I.W. "Bill" Gregory	1965–1969	Republican	Muscogee		
Floyd Hudgins	1969–1989	Democrat	Muscogee		
Gary Parker	1989–1991	Democrat	Muscogee	First African-American to represent the district	
Sanford Bishop	1991–1993	Democrat	Muscogee		
Ed Harbison	1993–present	Democrat	Muscogee		
