= Hugh Gillis =

American politician

Hugh M. Gillis
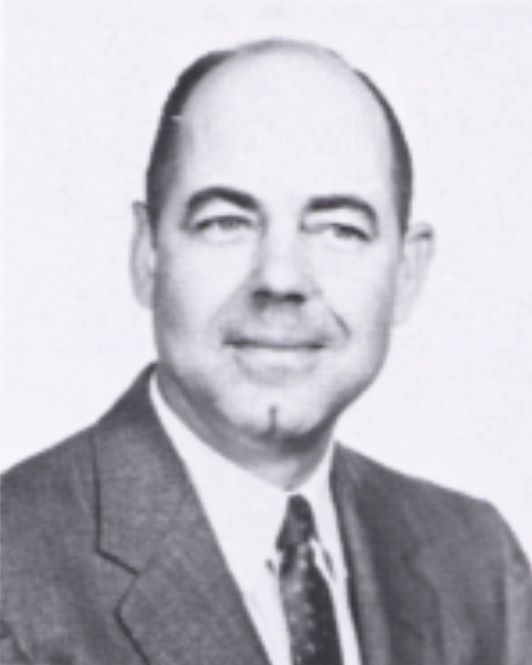

Member of the Georgia State Senate from the 20th district
- In office January 14, 1963 – January 10, 2005
- Preceded by: J. Floyd Harrington
- Succeeded by: Ross Tolleson

President pro tempore of the Georgia State Senate
- In office January 13, 1969 – January 1975
- Preceded by: Julian Webb
- Succeeded by: Al Holloway

Member of the Georgia State Senate from the 16th district
- In office January 14, 1957 – January 12, 1959
- Preceded by: Herschel Lovett
- Succeeded by: Henry C. Edenfield

Member of the Georgia House of Representatives from Treutlen County
- In office January 10, 1949 – January 14, 1957
- Preceded by: I. Howell Hall
- Succeeded by: J. Wyman Fowler
- In office January 13, 1941 – January 8, 1945
- Preceded by: James Fowler
- Succeeded by: I. Howell Hall

Personal details
- Born: Hugh Marion Gillis; September 6, 1918 Soperton, Georgia, U.S.
- Died: January 1, 2013 (aged 94) Vidalia, Georgia, U.S.
- Party: Democratic
- Spouse: Laura Jean Gillis
- Relations: Jim L. Gillis Jr. (brother); Jim L. Gillis Sr. (father); Neil L. Gillis (grandfather)
- Education: University of Georgia (BS, 1939)

Hugh Marion Gillis (September 6, 1918 – January 1, 2013) was an American politician.

== Early life and education ==
Born in Soperton, Georgia, Gillis was a farmer and timber grower. He graduated from Soperton High School and then from University of Georgia with a degree in agriculture in 1939.

== Political career ==
Gillis served as a Democrat in the Georgia House of Representatives for twelve years and then the Georgia State Senate from 1962 to 2004 before retiring; when he retired, Gillis was the longest-serving member of the Georgia General Assembly. He died in Vidalia, Georgia on January 1, 2013.
