= Georgia's 40th Senate district =

Georgia's 40th State Senate district
Senator
Sally Harrell; D–Atlanta
- Demographics: 43.69% White; 16.42% Black; 24.81% Hispanic; 10.84% Asian; 0.12% Native American; 0.04% Hawaiian/Pacific Islander; 0.65% Other; 4.44% Multiracial
- Population (2020) • Voting age: 190,544; 147,000

District 40 of the Georgia Senate is located in Metro Atlanta.

The district includes northern DeKalb and western Gwinnett counties, including all or parts of Brookhaven, Chamblee, Doraville, Dunwoody, Norcross, and Peachtree Corners. While the district includes many neighborhoods in DeKalb County with Atlanta addresses, there is no part of the city of Atlanta within the district.

The current senator is Sally Harrell, a Democrat from Atlanta first elected in 2018.

Former occupants of the seat include Zell Miller, former governor and U.S. senator, and Paul Coverdell, former U.S. senator.

== List of senators ==
Member	Party	Years	Residence	Electoral history	Counties
L.T. Mitchell		1947–1949	Clayton		
Osbon L. Foster		1949–1951	Hiawassee		
Bonnell Akins		1951–1953	Blairsville		
Harry L. Brown		1953–1955	Mountain City		
W. K. Dean		1955–1957	Young Harris		
H. M. Edge		1957–1959	Blairsville		
Russell Ellis Cannon		1959 – January 9, 1961	Clayton		
Zell Miller		January 9, 1961 – January 14, 1963			
Dan MacIntyre		January 14, 1963 – April 6, 1969			
E. Earl Patton		June 4, 1969 – January 8, 1973			
Paul D. Coverdell		January 8, 1973 – May 2, 1989			
Michael J. Egan		June 1989 – January 2001			
Rusty Paul		January 3, 2001 – January 3, 2003			
Liane Levetan		2003–2005			
Dan Weber		2005–2011			
Fran Millar		2011 – January 13, 2019			
Sally Harrell		January 14, 2019 – present			
