= Frank E. Coggin =

American politician

Member of the Georgia State Senate
- In office 1963–1974
- In office 1983–1984

Personal details
- Born: October 2, 1927 Coweta County, Georgia, U.S.
- Died: March 10, 2016 (aged 88)
- Party: Democratic
- Education: Woodrow Wilson Law School

Frank E. Coggin (October 2, 1927 – March 10, 2016) was an American politician. He served as a Democratic member of the Georgia State Senate.

== Life and career ==
Coggin was born in Coweta County, Georgia. He attended Woodrow Wilson Law School.

Coggin served in the Georgia State Senate from 1963 to 1974 and again from 1983 to 1984.

Coggin was a city attorney.

Coggin died on March 10, 2016, at the age of 88.
