= Robert H. Smalley Jr. =

American politician

Member of the Georgia State Senate
- In office 1961–1974

Personal details
- Born: August 1, 1929 Hart County, Georgia, U.S.
- Died: June 27, 2003 (aged 73)
- Party: Democratic
- Education: University of Georgia

Robert H. Smalley Jr. (August 1, 1929 – June 27, 2003) was an American politician. He served as a Democratic member of the Georgia State Senate.

== Life and career ==
Smalley was born in Hart County, Georgia. He attended the University of Georgia.

Smalley served in the Georgia State Senate from 1961 to 1974.

Smalley died on June 27, 2003, at the age of 73.
