= 128th Georgia General Assembly =

Term of state legislature in US state of Georgia

←	127th	129th	→
- Great Seal of the State of Georgia

Overview
- Legislative body: Georgia General Assembly
- Meeting place: Capitol Building - Atlanta

Senate
- Members: 54
- President of the Senate: Peter Zack Geer
- Party control: Democratic Party

House of Representatives
- Members: 205
- Speaker of the House: George T. Smith
- Party control: Democratic Party

Sessions
- 1st: January 11, 1965 – January 22, 1965
- 2nd: January 10, 1966 – February 18, 1966

Special sessions
- 1st: February 8, 1965 – March 12, 1965

The 128th Georgia General Assembly convened its first session on January 13, 1965, at the Georgia State Capitol in Atlanta. The 128th Georgia General Assembly succeeded the 127th and served as the precedent for the 129th in 1967.

Governor Carl Sanders, who was elected in 1962 as the first governor elected by popular vote since 1908, spearheaded a massive reapportionment of Georgia's General Assembly and 10 U.S. Congressional districts, providing more proportional representation to the state's urban areas. This, as well as passage of the Civil Rights Act of 1964 and Voting Rights Act of 1965 had opened voter registration to blacks, saw eleven African Americans elected to the Georgia House of Representatives in special elections in 1965 and 1966. By ending the disfranchisement of blacks through discriminatory voter registration, African Americans regained the ability to vote and entered the political process. This was the first time that African-Americans had sat in the House since W. H. Rogers of McIntosh resigned his seat in 1907 during the 99th Assembly. Among them were six from Atlanta (William Alexander, Julian Bond, Benjamin D. Brown, Julius C. Daugherty Sr., J. D. Grier, Grace Towns Hamilton, John Hood) and one each from Columbus (Albert Thompson) and Augusta (Richard Dent). Horace T. Ward also joined Leroy Johnson as the second African-American in the State Senate.

== Controversy ==
On January 10, 1966, Georgia state representatives voted 184–12 not to seat Julian Bond, one of the eleven African-American members, because he had publicly endorsed SNCC's policy regarding opposition to United States involvement in the Vietnam War. They disliked his stated sympathy for persons who were "unwilling to respond to a military draft". A three-judge panel on the United States District Court for the Northern District of Georgia ruled in a 2–1 decision that the Georgia House had not violated any of Bond's constitutional rights. In 1966, the Supreme Court of the United States ruled 9–0 in the case of Bond v. Floyd (385 U.S. 116) that the Georgia House of Representatives had denied Bond his freedom of speech and was required to seat him.

== Party standing ==
=== Senate ===
- Republicans: 9
- Democrats: 44
- Independents: 1

== Officers ==
=== Senate ===
- President: Peter Zack Geer
- President pro tempore: Harry C. Jackson
- Administration Floor Leader: Julian Webb
- Secretary: George T. Stewart
- Assistant Secretary: Lamont Smith

=== House ===
- Speaker: George T. Smith
- Speaker pro tempore: Maddox Hale
- Administration Floor Leader: George Busbee
- Assistant Floor Leader: J. Robin Harris

== Members of the State Senate ==
District	Senator	Party	Residence
1	Frank O. Downing	Democratic	Savannah
2	William Searcey	Democratic	Savannah
3	Joseph Tribble	Republican	Savannah
4	Berry Avant Edenfield	Democratic	Statesboro
5	John M. Gayner, III	Democratic	Brunswick
6	Roscoe E. Dean Jr.	Democratic	Jesup
7	Frank Eldridge Jr.	Democratic	Waycross
8	Robert A. Rowan	Democratic	Enigma
9	Ford Spinks	Democratic	Tifton
10	William H. Flowers	Democratic	Thomasvile
11	Julian Webb	Democratic	Donalsonville
12	Al Holloway	Democratic	Albany
13	Martin Young	Democratic	Rebecca
14	Jimmy Carter	Democratic	Plains
15	A. Perry Gordy	Republican	Columbus
16	Ivey William Gregory	Republican	Columbus
17	John Thomas McKenzie	Democratic	Montezuma
18	Stanley Smith	Democratic	Perry
19	Roy Noble	Democratic	Vienna
20	Hugh Gillis	Democratic	Soperton
21	Roy G. Foster	Republican	Wadley
22	Rudolph Holley	Democratic	Augusta
23	Michael Padgett	Independent	McBean
24	Sam P. McGill	Democratic	Washington
25	Culver Kidd Jr.	Democratic	Milledgeville
26	John W. Adams III	Republican	Macon
27	Oliver Bateman	Republican	Macon
28	Robert H. Smalley Jr.	Democratic	Griffin
29	Render Hill	Democratic	Greenville
30	Lamar Plunkett	Democratic	Bowdon
31	Albert F. Moore	Democratic	Cedartown
32	Edward Kendrick	Democratic	Marietta
33	Kyle Yancey	Democratic	Austell
34	Standish Thompson	Republican	East Point
35	Frank E. Coggin	Democratic	Hapeville
36	Joe Salome	Democratic	Atlanta
37	James Wesberry	Democratic	Atlanta
38	Leroy Johnson	Democratic	Atlanta
39	Horace Ward	Democratic	Atlanta
40	Dan MacIntyre	Republican	Atlanta
41	Gene Sanders	Republican	Tucker
42	Ben F. Johnson	Democratic	Atlanta
43	Frank G. Miller	Republican	Decatur
44	Kenneth Kilpatrick	Democratic	Forest Park
45	Brooks Pennington	Democratic	Madison
46	Paul C. Broun Sr.	Democratic	Athens
47	Robert Lee	Democratic	Hartwell
48	J. Albert Minish	Democratic	Commerce
49	Erwin Owens	Democratic	Dahlonega
50	Robert Ballew	Democratic	Blue Ridge
51	Jack Fincher	Democratic	Canton
52	James Battle Hall	Democratic	Rome
53	Joseph Loggins	Democratic	Summerville
54	W.W. (Bill) Fincher, Jr.	Democratic	Chatsworth

== Members of the House ==
District	Representative	Party	Residence
1-1	Maddox Hale	Democratic	Trenton
1-2	Billy Shaw Abney	Democratic	LaFayette
1-3	Wayne Snow Jr.	Democratic	Chickamauga
2	Joe T. Clark	Democratic	Ringgold
3-1	Thomas M. Mitchell	Democratic	Dalton
3-2	Virgil T. Smith	Democratic	Dalton
3-3	Gerald H. Leonard	Democratic	Chatsworth
4	A.C. Duncan	Democratic	McCaysville
5	Carlton H. Colwell	Democratic	Blairsville
6	Fulton Lovell	Democratic	Clayton
7	James H. Floyd	Democratic	Trion
8	J. C. Maddox	Democratic	Calhoun
9	Charles B. Watkins	Democratic	Ellijay
10	James Otwell	Democratic	Cumming
11	Thomas Irvin	Democratic	Mt. Airy
12	Don C. Moore	Democratic	Toccoa
13-1	Sidney Lowrey	Democratic	Rome
13-2	Jerry Lee Minge	Democratic	Rome
13-3	Dick Starnes	Democratic	Rome
14-1	Joe Frank Harris	Democratic	Cartersville
14-2	David N. Vaughan Jr.	Democratic	Cartersville
15	Thomas A. Roach	Democratic	Ball Ground
16-1	Bill Williams	Democratic	Gainesville
16-2	Howard T. Overby	Democratic	Gainesville
16-3	Joe Terrell Wood	Democratic	Gainesville
17	Thomas Stovall	Democratic	Danielsville
18	A.T. Mauldin	Democratic	Carnesville
19	M. Parks Brown	Democratic	Hartwell
20-1	J. Harvey Moore	Democratic	Cedartown
20-2	Nathan D. Dean	Democratic	Rockmart
21	George Bagby	Democratic	Dallas
22-1	Earl P. Story	Democratic	Lawrenceville
22-2	Tom O. Watson	Democratic	Lawrenceville
23	James W. Paris	Democratic	Winder
24	Mac Barber	Democratic	Commerce
25	Albert Sidney Johnson, Sr.	Democratic	Elberton
26	Tom Murphy	Democratic	Bremen
27	Kent Dickinson	Democratic	Douglasville
28	J.T. Byrd	Democratic	Loganville
29-1	Chappelle Matthews	Democratic	Athens
29-2	W. Randall Bedgood	Democratic	Athens
30	Hubert H. Wells	Democratic	Watkinsville
31	Ben B. Ross	Democratic	Lincolnton
32-1	William Wiggins	Democratic	Carollton
32-2	Herschel L. Reid	Democratic	Villa Rica
33-1	D.B. Blalock	Democratic	Newnan
33-2	Truitt Davis	Democratic	Franklin
34-1	Quimby Melton	Democratic	Griffin
34-2	George Clark Gaissert	Republican	Griffin
35-1	Bill Lee	Democratic	Forest Park
35-2	Arch Gray	Democratic	Riverdale
35-3	A. Hewlette Harrell	Democratic	Fayetteville
36	Ray Tucker	Democratic	McDonough
37	Otis Spillers	Democratic	Covington
38	E. Roy Lambert	Democratic	Madison
39	Asa Marshall	Democratic	Eatonton
40	Bobby Ware Johnson	Democratic	Warrenton
41	Glenn Phillips	Democratic	Harlem
42-1	J. Crawford Ware	Democratic	Hoganville
42-2	Harry Spikes	Democratic	LaGrange
43	Jimmy NeSmith	Democratic	Manchester
44	J.R. Smith	Democratic	Barnesville
45	Harold G. Clarke	Democratic	Forsyth
46	John Hadaway	Democratic	Hillsboro
47-1	J. Floyd Harrington	Democratic	Milledgeville
47-2	Phillip Chandler	Democratic	Milledgeville
48-1	Tom C. Carr	Democratic	Sandersville
48-2	Emory Rowland	Democratic	Wrightsville
49	J. Roy McCracken	Democratic	Jefferson
50-1	Preston B. Lewis	Democratic	Waynesboro
50-2	A. Sid Newton	Democratic	Millen
51	Johnnie L. Caldwell	Democratic	Thomaston
52	Daniel Grahl	Democratic	Fort Valley
53	Alf Truitt Land	Democratic	Allentown
54	George L. Smith	Democratic	Swainsboro
55	H. Walstein Parker	Democratic	Sylvania
56	J. Lucius Black	Democratic	Preston
57	Rainey Taylor	Democratic	Butler
58	Carl Savage	Democratic	Montezuma
59-1	Paul Stalnaker	Democratic	Warner Robins
59-2	David Peterson	Democratic	Kathleen
60-1	Bill Knight	Democratic	Dexter
60-2	W. Herschel Lovett	Democratic	Dublin
61	Joe Underwood	Democratic	Mount Vernon
62	John Collins	Democratic	Vidalia
63	Hines Brantley	Democratic	Metter
64-1	W. Jones Lane	Democratic	Statesboro
64-2	Paul E. Nessmith	Democratic	Statesboro
65	J. Terrell Webb	Republican	Springfield
66	Jake Dailey	Democratic	Cuthbert
67	Ed Fulford	Democratic	Dawson
68-1	William Blair	Democratic	Americus
68-2	Janet Merritt	Democratic	Americus
69-1	Howard H. Rainey	Democratic	Cordele
69-2	Rooney Bowen	Democratic	Vienna
70	Frank Holder	Democratic	Eastman
71	John Henry Anderson	Democratic	Hawkinsville
72	Brad Dorminy	Democratic	Fitzgerald
73	Norman Doster	Democratic	Rochelle
74	Curtis C. Herndon	Democratic	Surrency
75	Dewey Rush	Democratic	Glennville
76	Charles M. Jones	Democratic	Hinesville
77	Glenn Thomas	Democratic	Jesup
78	W. Harvey Jordan	Democratic	Leary
79-1	George Busbee	Democratic	Albany
79-2	Colquitt Odom	Democratic	Albany
79-3	Dick Hutchinson	Democratic	Albany
79-4	William Spencer Lee	Democratic	Albany
80	William Crowe	Democratic	Sylvester
81	Harry Mixon	Democratic	Ocilla
82	George Williams	Democratic	Axson
83-1	Ottis Sweat	Democratic	Waycross
83-2	Harry Dixon	Democratic	Waycross
84	Francis Houston	Democratic	Blackshear
85-1	Reid W. Harris	Democratic	St. Simons
85-2	Alan Smith	Democratic	Brunswick
86	William Mobley Howell	Democratic	Blakely
87	J.O. Brackin	Democratic	Iron City
88	Marcus Collins	Democratic	Pelham
89-1	Hubert Dollar	Democratic	Brainbridge
89-2	J. Willis Conger	Democratic	Bainbridge
89-2	Anthony Cato	Democratic	Bainbridge
90	George T. Smith	Democratic	Cairo
91	James L. Conner	Democratic	Hazlehurst
92-1	Henry Russell	Democratic	Boston
92-2	Jamie Oglesby	Republican	Thomasville
93	Henry Allen	Democratic	Tifton
94-1	David Newton	Democratic	Norman Park
94-2	Dorsey Matthews	Democratic	Moultrie
95-1	Berry Sullivan	Democratic	Valdosta
95-2	Hurram Barfield	Democratic	Hahira
95-3	James Bennett	Democratic	Valdosta
96	Allen Parrish	Democratic	Adel
97	Robert Pafford	Democratic	Lakeland
98	Robert Harrison	Democratic	St. Marys
99	Henry L. Reaves	Democratic	Quitman
100	William Steis	Democratic	Hamilton
101-1	Gerald Howard	Democratic	Marietta
101-2	Hugh McDaniel	Democratic	Smyrna
102-1	Joe Wilson	Democratic	Marietta
102-2	Jack Henderson	Democratic	Marietta
103	Bennie Jordan	Republican	Mableton
104-1	William Snellings	Democratic	Augusta
104-2	James Hull	Democratic	Augusta
105-1	R. Luke DeLong	Republican	Augusta
105-2	John H. Sherman	Democratic	Augusta
106-1	William M. Fleming	Democratic	Augusta
106-2	Leroy Simkins	Republican	Augusta
107	James Elliott	Republican	Macon
108	Wallace Bryant	Republican	Macon
109-1	Giles Paul Jones	Republican	Macon
109-2	George Knapp	Republican	Macon
109-3	John F. Stewart	Republican	Macon
109-4	Roger W. Wilson	Republican	Macon
110-1	Charles Berry	Democratic	Columbus
110-2	Albert Thompson	Democratic	Columbus
111-1	Lawrence Shields	Democratic	Columbus
111-2	Roscoe Thompson	Democratic	Columbus
112-1	Mac Pickard	Democratic	Columbus
112-2	Milton Jones	Democratic	Columbus
112-3	Jack Brinkley	Democratic	Columbus
113-1	Arthur M. Gignilliat Jr.	Democratic	Savannah
113-2	Eugene Powers	Democratic	Savannah
114-1	Alan Gaynor	Democratic	Savannah
114-2	W. Lance Smith	Democratic	Savannah
115-1	John Tye	Democratic	Savannah
115-2	Albert Kiley	Democratic	Savannah
116-1	Dick Richardson	Democratic	Savannah
116-2	Lionel Drew	Democratic	Savannah
116-3	Arthur Funk	Democratic	Savannah
117-1	Clarence R. Vaughn Jr.	Democratic	Conyers
117-2	Tom Palmer	Democratic	Chamblee
117-3	W.B. Malone	Democratic	Chamblee
117-4	George H. Carley	Democratic	Stone Mountain
118-1	J. Robin Harris	Democratic	Decatur
118-2	Bob Farrar	Democratic	Avondale Estates
118-3	Robert Walling	Democratic	Atlanta
118-4	Elliott Levitas	Democratic	Atlanta
119-1	Jack Bean	Republican	Decatur
119-2	Robert Evensen	Republican	Decatur, Georgia
119-3	James Westlake	Republican	Ellenwood
119-4	Joseph Higginbotham	Republican	Decatur
120	Charlie Brown	Democratic	Atlanta
121	Guy Hill	Democratic	Atlanta
122	Young Longing	Democratic	Fairburn
123-1	Rodney Mims Cook Sr.	Republican	Atlanta
123-2	Jack Etheridge	Democratic	Atlanta
123-3	Shag Cates	Democratic	Atlanta
124	John Hood	Democratic	Atlanta
125	George Adams	Democratic	Atlanta
126	Frank Lea	Democratic	Hapeville
127	William Cox	Democratic	Atlanta
128	Thomas Dillon	Democratic	Atlanta
129	Charles L. Carnes	Democratic	Atlanta
130	Nick Lambros	Democratic	Atlanta
131	Bill Sims	Democratic	Atlanta
132	J. D. Grier	Democratic	Atlanta
133	William Alexander	Democratic	Atlanta
134	Julius C. Daughtery Sr.	Democratic	Atlanta
135	Benjamin D. Brown	Democratic	Atlanta
136	Julian Bond	Democratic	Atlanta
137	Grace Towns Hamilton	Democratic	Atlanta
138	Devereaux McClatchey	Democratic	Atlanta
139	Herb Hawkins	Democratic	Roswell
140	Kiliaen Townsend	Republican	Atlanta
141	Michael J. Egan	Republican	Atlanta

== See also ==
- List of Georgia state legislatures
