= Pillars of fire and cloud =

One of the manifestations of the presence of Yahweh in the Torah

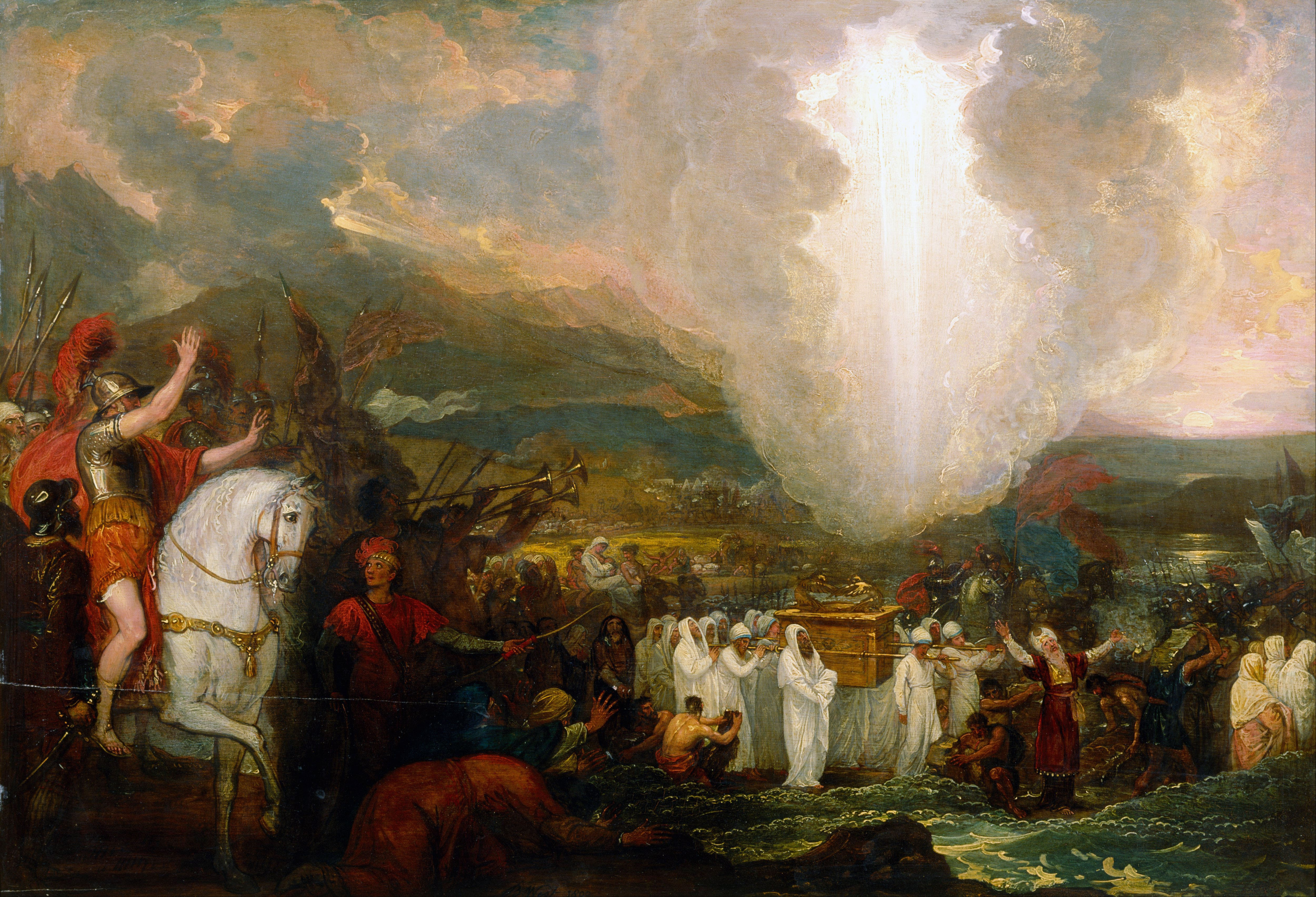
Joshua passing the River Jordan with the Ark of the Covenant, 1800, by Benjamin West.

The pillar of fire (Hebrew: עמוד אש, romanized: ‘ammuḏ ’ēš) and pillar of cloud (Hebrew: עמוד ענן, romanized: ‘ammūḏ ‘ānān) are a dual theophany (manifestation of God) described in various places in the first five books of the Hebrew Bible. The pillars are said to have guided the Israelites through the desert during the Exodus from Egypt. The pillar of cloud provided a visible guide for the Israelites during the day, while the pillar of fire lit their way by night.

== Biblical narrative ==
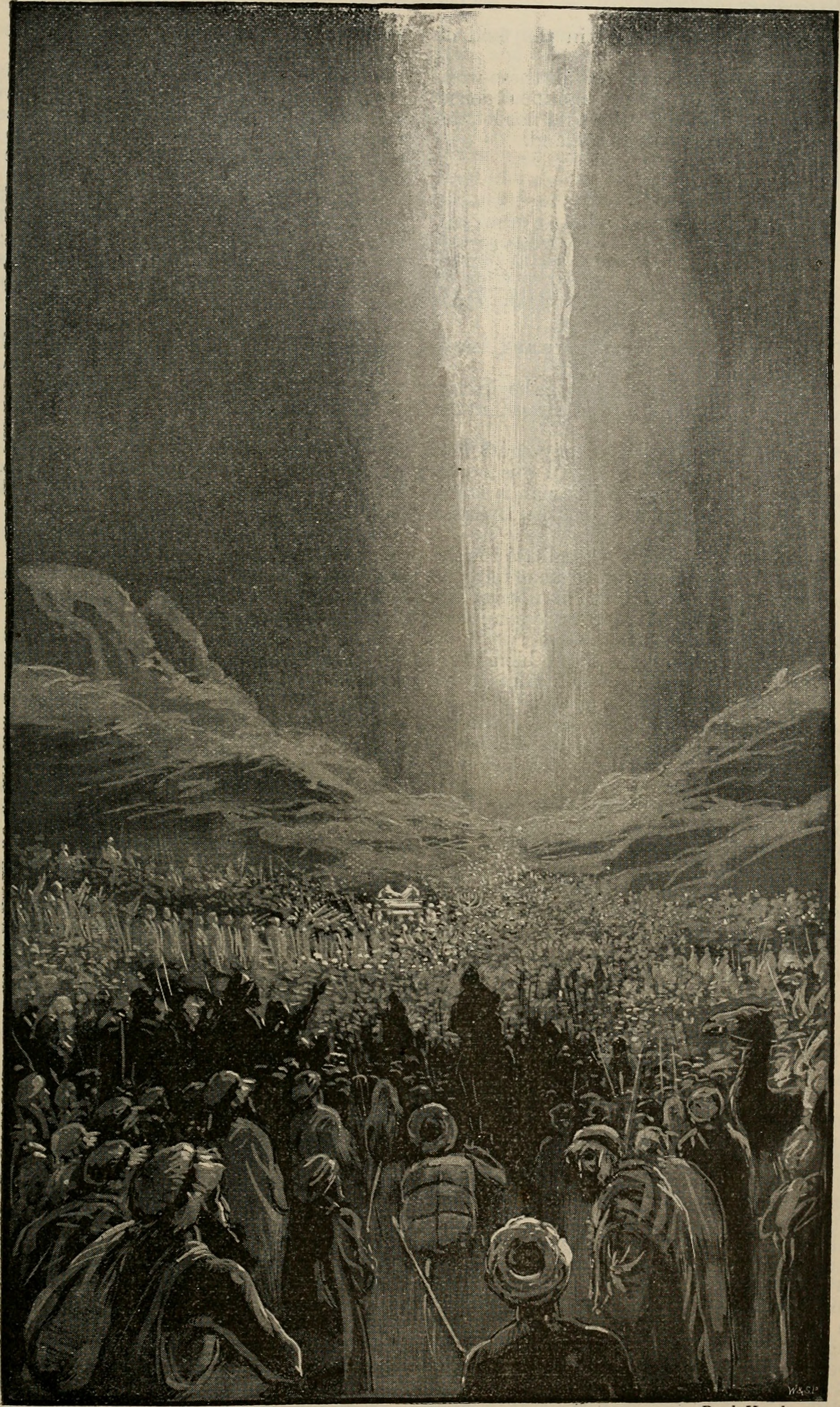
The Pillar of Fire by Paul Hardy, The Art Bible (1896)

The pillars of cloud and fire are first mentioned in Exodus 13, shortly after Moses leads the Israelites out of their captivity in Egypt. The narrative states that the pillar of cloud went ahead of them by day to guide their way, and the pillar of fire by night, to give them light.

The Pharaoh, however, brings an army in pursuit of the Israelites and catches up to them at their encampment beside the Red Sea. The pillar of cloud intervenes to keep the army from approaching during the night; it positions itself behind the Israelites, casting light upon their camp while leaving the Egyptian army in darkness. Then Moses parts the Red Sea, and the Israelites cross the dry riverbed. The Egyptians follow them, but God looks down upon them from the pillar of fire and cloud and throws their forces into confusion.

When the Israelites arrive at Mount Sinai, the cloud covers the mountain, and Moses enters into it to receive the commandments. To the observers below, the cloud appears as a "devouring fire" on top of the mountain. Later, after the Tabernacle (or "tent of meeting") has been constructed, the pillar of cloud descends to the entrance of the tent, where God talks with Moses "face to face".

From this point on, the narrative states that whenever the Israelites made camp, the cloud would descend and cover the Tabernacle (looking like fire by night). When it lifted again, they would set out on the next stage of the journey, with the cloud leading the way. Sometimes the cloud would remain a long time over the Tabernacle; sometimes only from evening until morning. Whether it lingered for "two days, or a month, or a year", the Israelites would not break camp until the cloud lifted up and moved on. (Note: Other mentions of the pillars of cloud and fire in the Pentateuch include: Exodus 16:10; Leviticus 16:2; Numbers 11:25, 12:5, 12:10, 14:14, 16:42; Deuteronomy 1:32–33, 31:15)

Elsewhere in the Bible, there are references to the pillars of cloud and fire in the Book of Psalms, and the Book of Nehemiah. The theme is built upon in the Book of Isaiah; in chapter 4, the prophet describes his vision of the holy city of Zion in the post-apocalyptic era, and says that the city will be canopied by a cloud of smoke by day and a fire by night. There is also reference to a fire inside a cloud in the first chapter of the Book of Ezekiel, and this chapter has been traditionally linked to the story of the revelation at Sinai.

== Traditional interpretations ==
Christian commentators have generally considered that the narrative describes not two pillars (one of cloud and one of fire), but a single pillar which changes its appearance by day or by night. Carl Friedrich Keil, for example, wrote: "[W]e have to imagine the cloud as the covering of the fire, so that by day it appeared as a dark cloud in contrast with the light of the sun, but by night as a fiery splendour." As evidence for this, Keil cites Exodus 40:38, and interprets that the fire was in the cloud (a rendering followed by most modern translations). He also points to Exodus 14:20, which suggests that the cloud had a bright side and a dark side, being able to simultaneously illuminate the Israelite camp while spreading darkness over the Egyptians. This point is explicitly stated in an ancient Jewish version of the text, Targum Pseudo-Jonathan, which reads: "a cloud, one half of which was light and one half darkness."

On the other hand, the medieval Jewish commentator Nachmanides held that there were two pillars, and that in the passage under discussion, the pillar of cloud interposed itself between the pillar of fire and the Egyptian army, thus preventing the light of the fire from reaching them. Rashi, likewise, believed that there were two pillars, writing that "before one set, the other rose".

Another interpretative tradition centers on the idea that an angel may have been concealed within the cloud. James Kugel sees the basis of this tradition in the fact that in several places (for example, in Exodus 23), the Bible suggests that the Israelites were led out of Egypt by an angel, but no actual manifestations of this angel are described. Therefore, commentators such as Philo have located the angel within the cloud. Kugel also suggests that early commentators identified the angel with the personification of Wisdom, who is said in Sirach 24 to have her throne in a pillar of cloud, and in Wisdom 10 to have guided the Israelites, being a shelter to them by day, and a "starry flame" by night. The divine presence within the cloud has also been connected with the Shekhinah.

Louis Ginzberg's Legends of the Jews records a tradition that the cloud entirely surrounded the Israelites, and "shed sunlight by day and moonlight by night, so that Israel ... might distinguish between night and day". It also states that within the cloud were the Hebrew letters Yod and He (the first two letters of YHWH), which moved about ceaselessly above the camp, only coming to a standstill on the Sabbath.

Another Jewish legend claims that as the cloud travelled ahead of the Israelites, it would flatten hills and raise up valleys, creating a level path.

== Symbolic significance ==
Some writers have suggested that the description of the pillars of fire and cloud may be an obscure reference to an actual signalling device employed by the Israelites. A historic parallel to such a practice can be found in Quintus Curtius's History of Alexander. Curtius explains how Alexander would ready his camp for the march:

When he wished to move his camp, he used to give the signal with the trumpet, the sound of which was often not readily enough heard amid the noise made by the bustling soldiers; therefore he set up a pole on top of the general's tent, which could be clearly seen from all sides, and from this a lofty signal, visible to all alike, was watched for, fire by night, smoke in the daytime.

Arab caravans have also commonly made use of braziers as a guiding signal.

Among the authors analysing the imagery from a literary perspective, some have suggested that the "fire and smoke" motifs are derived from the account of the Revelation at Sinai, in which God descends upon the mountain "in fire", and smoke rises up "as the smoke of a furnace". Martin Noth claims that this story was based upon an ancient observation of an active volcano, and that the pillars represent an evolution of this volcanic imagery. Jack Miles agrees that the events at Mount Sinai bear a resemblance to a volcanic eruption; he also suggests that the subsequent descent of the cloud into the Tabernacle is intended to emphasise the personal relationship between God and the Israelites, through "the extraordinary image of a volcano brought into a tent."

Frank Cross argues that the references to thunder and lightning in the Sinai narrative indicate a stormcloud rather than a volcano. He claims that the imagery has its origin in a Canaanite Ba'al myth, which, removed from its original context, has been altered and "historicized", so that "the storm cloud ... on which the god rides, or which he drives as a chariot, has become a column of cloud".

Carey Walsh, on the other hand, believes that the pillars are not merely extensions of the Sinai myth, but represent "a new form of theophany", in which the divine presence takes on a more subtle and nebulous form than previously, but at the same time becomes accessible to the whole assembly of Israelites, who have previously only received their instructions through an intermediary.

Walter Bayerlin suggests that the imagery is primarily derived from an ancient incense-burning ritual, which in turn was developed around the idea that God must always be concealed in a cloud of smoke, because no mortal can set eyes on him and live.

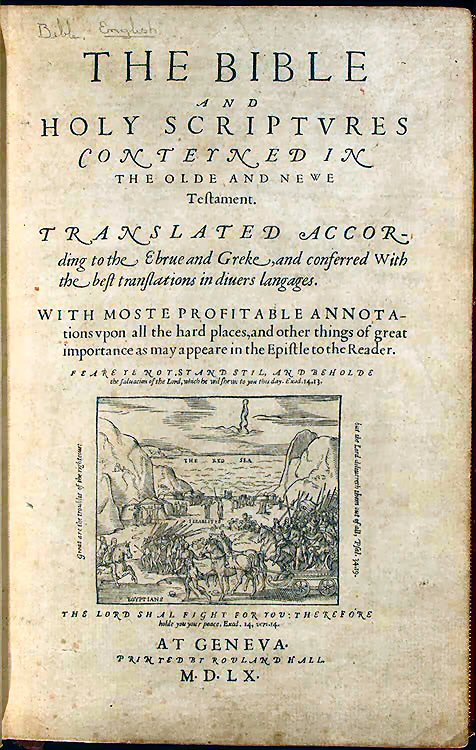
Frontispiece of the 1560 Geneva Bible, showing the pillars of fire

The image was selected for the frontispiece of the Geneva Bible published by Sir Rowland Hill in 1560, itself picked up by Benjamin Franklin as a possible inspiration for the first Great Seal of the United States of America.

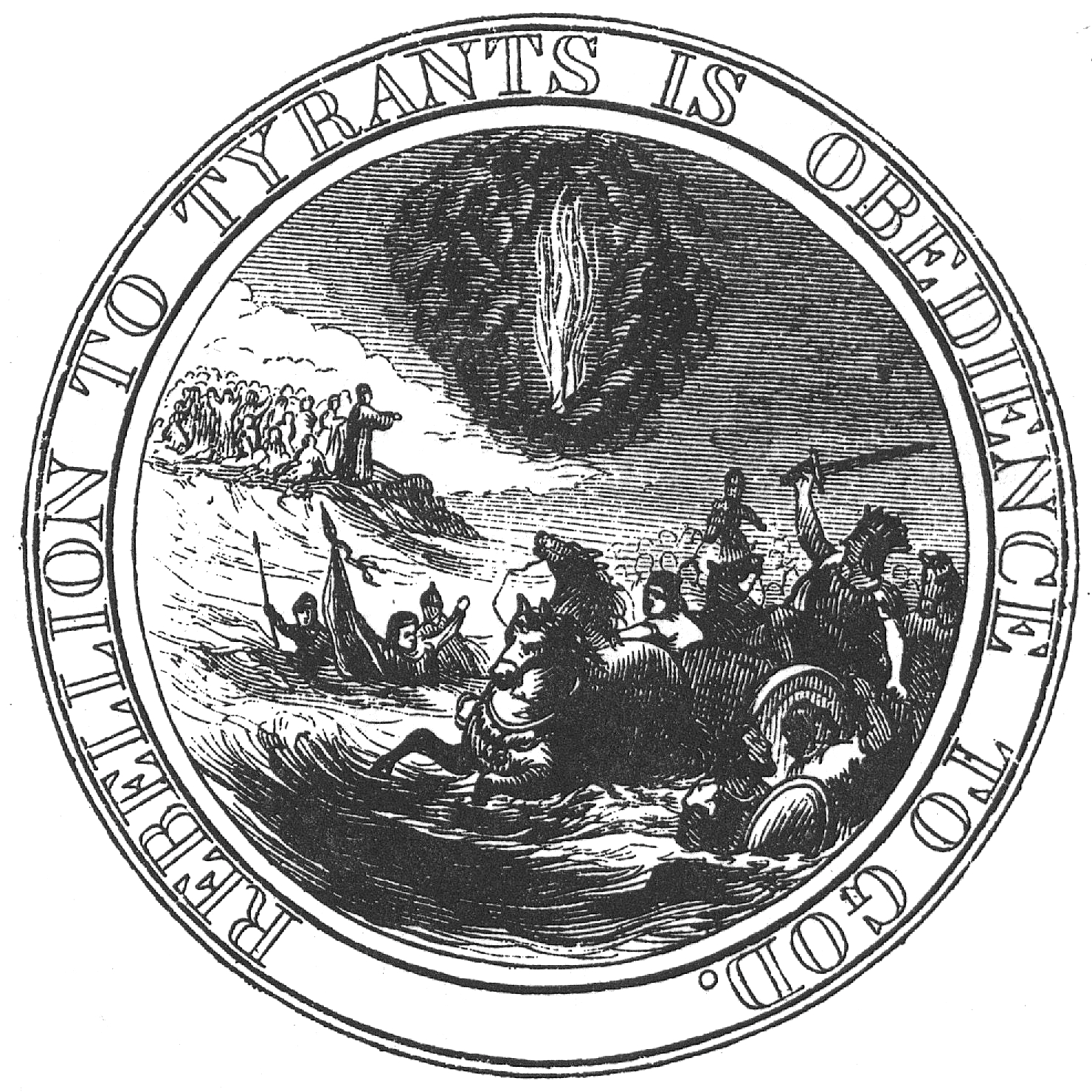
Franklin's design for the First Great Seal of America, inspired by the Geneva Bible

== Bibliography ==
- Beyerlin, Walter (1965). Origins and History of the Oldest Sinaitic Traditions. Oxford: Blackwell.
- Cross, Frank M. (1997). Canaanite Myth and Hebrew Epic: Essays in the History of the Religion of Israel. Harvard University Press. ISBN 9780674091764.
- Etheridge, J. W. (1862). The Targums of Onkelos and Jonathan ben Uzziel on the Pentateuch. London: Longman, Green, Longman and Roberts.
- Gabriel, Richard A. (2003). The Military History of Ancient Israel. Praeger. ISBN 9780275977986.
- Ginsberg, Louis (1909). "Chapter IV". Legends of the Jews, Vol. 3. Translated by Paul Radin. Internet Sacred Text Archive.
- Keil, Carl F.; Delitzsch, Franz (1864). Biblical Commentary on the Old Testament, Volume II. Translated by James Martin. Edinburgh: T. and T. Clark.
- Kugel, James L. (2009). Traditions of the Bible. Harvard University Press. ISBN 9780674039766.
- Miles, Jack (1995). God: A Biography. Simon & Schuster. ISBN 9780679418337.
- Noth, Martin (1962). Exodus: A Commentary. Philadelphia: Westminster Press.
- Peake, Arthur S., ed. (1920). Peake's Commentary on the Bible. London: T. C. & E. C. Jack.
- Rolfe, John C. (1971) [1946]. Quintus Curtius' History of Alexander. Loeb classical library. Harvard University Press / William Heinemann.
- Teugels, Lieve (1996). "Did Moses See the Chariot?". In Vervenne, Marc (ed.). Studies in the Book of Exodus. Leuven University Press. ISBN 9789061867555.
- Unterman, Alan (1997). "Pillar of Cloud and of Fire". Dictionary of Jewish Lore and Legend. Thames & Hudson. ISBN 9780500279847.
- Walsh, Carey (July 10, 2013). "Where Did God Go? Theophanic Shift in Exodus". Biblical Theology Bulletin. 43 (3): 115–123. doi:10.1177/0146107913493560. S2CID 171039413.
