= Richard Hutchinson =

Richard Hutchinson may refer to:

- Richard A. Hutchinson (1853–1921), American politician
- Richard Hutchinson (MP), English politician, MP for Rochester
- Richard Hutchinson, film producer, of The Secret Adventures of Tom Thumb
- Richard Hutchinson (composer) (1590–1646), English organist and composer
- Dick Hutchinson (1890–1977), Australian rules footballer

== See also ==
- Richard Hutchison (1812–1891), Canadian businessman and politician
- Richard Hely-Hutchinson (disambiguation)
