= Grace Towns Hamilton =

American politician

Member of the Georgia House of Representatives from the 137th, 112th and 31st district
- In office 1966 – January 14, 1985
- Succeeded by: Mable Thomas

Personal details
- Born: February 10, 1907 Atlanta, Georgia, U.S.
- Died: June 17, 1992 (aged 85) Atlanta, Georgia, U.S.
- Resting place: South View Cemetery
- Party: Democratic
- Spouse: Henry Cooke Hamilton
- Children: Eleanor
- Education: Atlanta University; Ohio State University

Grace Towns Hamilton (February 10, 1907 – June 17, 1992) was an American politician who was the first African-American woman elected to the Georgia General Assembly. As executive director of the Atlanta Urban League from 1943 to 1960, Hamilton was involved in issues of housing, health care, schools and voter registration within the black community. She was 1964 co-founder of the bi-racial Partners for Progress to help government and the private sector effect compliance with the Civil Rights Act of 1964. In 1973, Hamilton became a principal architect for the revision of the Atlanta City Charter. She was advisor to the United States Civil Rights Commission from 1985 to 1987.

== Early life and background ==
Grace Towns was born in Atlanta, Georgia, on February 10, 1907, to community activist parents George Alexander Towns Sr. and Nellie McNair Towns. She was the second of five children. Her sister Helen had died in 1905. Grace was followed by siblings George Jr. in 1909, Myron in 1910 and Harriet in 1920. The Towns family lived at University Place at Atlanta University, where the children's playmates were racially mixed. Atlanta University had been integrated since the 19th century. The family belonged to the First Congregational Church, where the members were active in civic affairs. Nellie Towns was involved in many outreach endeavors of the church. Grace joined the church's Atlanta Interracial Student Forum, and also became an active member of the YWCA.

=== Father's background ===
George Alexander Towns Sr. was an educator, poet and playwright who received degrees from both Atlanta University and Harvard University. At Atlanta University he taught English, Pedagogy and debate skills until his 1929 retirement. His professional colleagues included James Weldon Johnson and W. E. B. Du Bois. Towns was active in civic affairs, an officer of the NAACP, and an advocate for voter registration drives in the black community. He was born one of six children on March 5, 1870, in Albany, Georgia, to former slave Luke Towns Jr. and Mary Colt, said to be of Indian blood. Luke Towns Sr., born to an enslaved woman, was fathered by a white man named John Towns, who was also the father of George Washington Towns. Luke Towns Sr. wed a Cherokee woman named Maria. George Alexander Towns Sr. died December 20, 1960.

=== Mother's background ===
Harriet Eleanor "Nellie" McNair had been a student of George Alexander Towns Sr., and later entered the teaching profession. She was born in 1879 to parents Felix and Hattie Cherry McNair, but at some point her father had left, and Hattie was the sole parent in the family. The McNair family were all members of the First Congregational Church in Atlanta. After marrying George Towns in 1902, she engaged in community outreach programs sponsored by her church. She also helped found the Gate City Free Kindergarten Association for the children of working black parents. She was the first black woman to serve on the board of Atlanta's YWCA. Her mother Hattie McNair lived with the family until her death. Nellie McNair Towns died on May 11, 1967.

=== Marriage ===
In Ware Memorial Chapel on the grounds of Atlanta University, 23-year-old Grace Towns married 31-year-old Henry Cooke "Cookie" Hamilton on June 7, 1930. Both the Towns and Hamilton families had backgrounds with the university, as well as with Atlanta's First Congregational Church. Cookie's father and grandfather were prominent African-American building contractors in Atlanta. The couple's only child, Eleanor, was born in 1931. Cookie died on January 2, 1987.

=== Education ===
Oglethorpe Practice School was established on Atlanta University's campus in 1905. It offered grades K–7, with the senior class gaining experience in the teaching profession. After several years of having a private tutor in her parents' home, Grace Towns transferred to Oglethorpe for her last two years at that level. Her high-school education was the preparatory school at the university, the era's only city high school available to black students. She earned a Bachelor of Arts from Atlanta University in 1927. In 1929, she was awarded her master's degree in psychology from Ohio State University. Her brief sojourn as a student in Ohio was her initial experience with segregation. While she was aware of the effect of segregation on the African-American community, Atlanta University's integrated campus had sheltered her from being a part of it. Living in Columbus, Ohio, and working as a secretary at the YWCA brought her face-to-face with the effects of segregation and tokenism. After she and her husband Cookie Hamilton returned to live in Atlanta in 1941, she took two graduate courses at Atlanta University, one taught by family friend W. E. B. Dubois, and the other taught by former Director for Research at the National Urban League, Ira De Augustine Reid.

== Early career (1930–1942) ==
Prior to her marriage, Grace Towns had taught at both Clark College and the Atlanta School of Social Work. At the time of the marriage, Cookie Hamilton served in the capacity of both professor and dean at LeMoyne–Owen College in Memphis, Tennessee. The new Mrs. Hamilton joined the faculty at LeMoyne as a professor of psychology. In 1934, she became a statistic of the Great Depression when she was one of several employees laid off. Until 1941, she associated herself with the Memphis branch of the YWCA where she helped to establish the first Negro YWCA in the city. In 1935, she was hired to supervise a survey for the WPA on the black labor force in Shelby County. The result was published by the United States Government Printing Office in 1938 as The Urban Negro Worker in the United States, 1925–1936. In 1941, Cookie Hamilton accepted a position at Atlanta University, and the couple returned to their home city where Grace took advantage of her career downtime to enhance her education.

== Atlanta Urban League (1943–1960) ==
An affiliate of the National Urban League, the Atlanta Urban League (AUL) had been established in 1919 by Jesse O. Thomas. When the organization's executive director William Y. Bell left for other opportunities in 1943, civil rights attorney A.T. Walden suggested his friend Hamilton be named to fill the position. She held this position until 1960, and under her guidance the organization's board of directors became integrated to include influential whites among the members.

=== Housing ===
Hamilton and AUL housing secretary Robert A. Thompson made housing the organization's top priority. The goal was better housing in black communities, preferably on newly purchased land. Hamilton wished to move families out of ghettos into improved conditions in better neighborhoods. In 1947, they organized the Temporary Coordinating Committee on Housing to scout out potential development areas for the black community. Hamilton and Thompson, sometimes accompanied by others, made repeated trips to Washington D.C. to convince the Federal Housing Administration to provide insured mortgages to the black community. In July 1950, the federally insured 452-unit High Point apartment rental complex opened as a result of the AUL's efforts. Successes also included the detached single-family home development of Fairhaven, as well as Carver Public Housing and Perry Homes.

=== Education ===
In 1944, Hamilton directed a study be conducted by experts to assess the condition of black education in Atlanta. The Citizens Committee on Public Education was organized in 1945 to disseminate the study to the Atlanta Board of Education in particular, and to the public in general. The education board responded slowly by opening four kindergartens for black children between 1945 and 1948.

=== Voter registration ===
In 1944, the United States Supreme Court ruled against the exclusive white primary in Texas in the Smith v. Allwright case. In 1946, the Supreme Court ruled in King v. Chapman that Georgia's white primary violated the rights guaranteed in the Fourteenth Amendment to the United States Constitution. Hamilton and Thompson organized a voter registration drive in 1946 that registered 24,137 new black voters in Atlanta.

=== Health care ===
In December 1947, Hamilton and the AUL issued A Report on Hospital Care of the Negro Population of Atlanta, Georgia. The report detailed the lack of black physicians in Atlanta, and the limited health care available to Atlanta's black community. Although indigent black patients had been treated in Atlanta, no facility administered care to members of the black community who were able to pay for their care. The AUL's recommendation was the designation of a city hospital specific to the training and administering of health care to meet the needs of Atlanta's black citizens. Highlighting the tragedy of insufficient care available to blacks was the 1931 death of Juliette Derricotte, Dean of Women at Fisk University, following an automobile crash near Dalton, Georgia. Denied emergency care in Georgia, she was transported to a hospital in Chattanooga, Tennessee, where she died.

The Citizens Committee for Negro Hospital Care that included Hamilton and R. Hughs Wood of Emory University School of Medicine, as well as Benjamin Mays and Rufus Early Clement, was charged with finding a remedy for medical care for paying black patients. Atlanta was under served by black physicians, who trained and served elsewhere. Most trained at Meharry Medical College in Nashville, Tennessee. The Committee wanted to make inroads specifically at the segregated institution of Emory. The Hill-Burton Act of 1946, otherwise known as the National Hospital Survey and Construction Act, provided federal funding for new construction of facilities, and for expansion of medical services. Amended in 1949, it included a provision allowing segregated facilities on a "separate but equal" basis.

Towards this end, Hamilton added to the Committee local attorney Hughes Spalding, chairman of the Fulton-DeKalb Hospital Authority, which owned and operated Grady Memorial Hospital. Hamilton and Spalding proposed the separate but equal black facility, in spite of leaders in the black community pressing for full integration in society. Hamilton saw it as a beginning, but black leaders saw it as being out of touch with the reality of the times. The Hospital Authority donated the land for the hospital site, adjacent to Grady. Spalding won endorsements from county commissioners of Fulton and DeKalb, as well as the Fulton County Medical Society and area newspapers, which helped promote the concept. By 1949, $1.725 million in funds had been raised, with the remaining funding to come from the state and the Hospital Authority. Ground was broken on February 1, 1950. Named the Hughes Spalding Pavilion, it was dedicated May 29, 1952. Hamilton was named as secretary to the advisory board of trustees. In 1955, Hamilton and black members of Atlanta's legal and medical community organized Foundation for the Advancement of Medical and Nursing Education, with Hamilton as secretary. The foundation raised $10,000. No one applied for the money. Black interns could not serve at Grady. The United States Public Health Service provided $40,000 in surgery grants.

By 1960, Hamilton had decided to move forward with her life and career, and tendered her resignation to AUL. It was not until 1962 that Asa G. Yancey, Sr. became the first African-American physician at Emory.

== Post urban league (1961–1966) ==
She operated Hamilton and Associates consulting firm from 1961 through 1967. Her most notable client was Eli Ginzberg from Columbia University. He hired her to interview black college students in Atlanta as part of a study on career expectations of middle-class black youth. The report was published by Columbia University Press in 1967 under the title The Middle-Class Negro in the White Man's World. In 1964, Hamilton and Mrs. Edward M. Vinson founded the bi-racial Partners for Progress. Hamilton became vice-chair of the organization. The organization's mission was to help effect equal opportunity compliance with the Civil Rights Act of 1964. Affiliated with the National Women's Committee on Civil Rights, the organization worked through personal visitations, correspondence and telephone calls, monitoring and encouraging compliance with the law in all sectors of government, private enterprise and society. She also received multiple local, state and national appointments during these years. When Lyndon B. Johnson signed an executive order in 1966 to create the President's Council on Recreation and Natural Beauty, Hamilton was one of the council appointees. On July 8, 1964, armed police officers arrested and jailed Hamilton on an outstanding traffic court summons. When she appeared before court, she was fined $25.

== Georgia House of Representatives (1966–1984) ==
Hamilton was the first African-American woman elected to the Georgia General Assembly. In 1965, the General Assembly reapportioned the Georgia House of Representatives, adding twenty-one seats in Fulton County. A special election was held in 1965, and in 1966 Hamilton became one of eight African Americans elected to join Leroy Johnson, who had been serving in the lower house since 1963. The others were Horace T. Ward, Benjamin D. Brown, John Hood, Julian C. Daugherty, Albert W. Thompson, J. D. Grier Jr., William H. Alexander and Julian Bond. All but Bond were sworn in January 1966. The legislature refused to seat Bond because of his endorsement of the SNCC statement criticizing United States policy during the Vietnam War. Bond filed suit, and the Supreme Court agreed with Bond in December 1966, ordering the legislature to seat him.

The office holders elected in the 1965 special election were required to run for office in the 1966 election. Hamilton was re-elected, defeating opponent Helen Howard. Hamilton's district bore three different numbers, due to redistricting. She was originally elected to District 137. In 1969, that area became District 112. In 1973, it was changed to District 31 and remained so for the rest of her government service.

Hamilton began her legislative career on the committees for appropriations, education and health. One of her first bills was aimed at providing for the Georgia Highway Department to apply for federal matching funds to assist relocation of any resident displaced by new road construction. She also co-sponsored bill with Janet Merritt authorizing Georgia Arts Commission to extend its authority to encompass additional artistic genres. She was able to get legislation passed to revamp the electoral process in Fulton County by creating the County Board of Registration and Elections.

In 1965, the Public Service Administration of Chicago recommended restructuring the Atlanta City Council. Based upon that recommendation, Hamilton introduced a bill to establish Atlanta Charter Commission. Her goal was to bring city representation into compliance with the 1965 Voting Rights Act and apportion the council seats relative to the demographics of the city. This would give blacks fair representation in the city government. Commission chair Emmet J. Bondurant and vice-chair Hamilton began work July 1, 1971. Governor Jimmy Carter signed the new charter into law on March 16, 1973. The new charter separated the city's legislative and executive branches, but shrunk the size of the City Council. Protests were raised by those with a vested interest in the number of city council seats, and a compromise was worked out.

What eventually led to Hamilton being defeated for re-election in 1984, was a 1980 reapportionment battle against the Black Caucus, who wanted the reapportionment figured to their advantage. Hamilton felt so strongly they were wrong, that she ended up testifying before the United States District Court for the District of Columbia in 1982. The Black Caucus were so angered by what they believed to be a betrayal by Hamilton, that they put Mable Thomas against her in the primary. Hamilton lost to Thomas in the run-off election and never held elected office again.

== Final years ==
Following her election defeat, Hamilton served as advisor to the United States Civil Rights Commission (1985–87). She died on June 17, 1992, and was buried at South-View Cemetery in Atlanta.
