= Rashad Taylor =

American politician (born 1981)

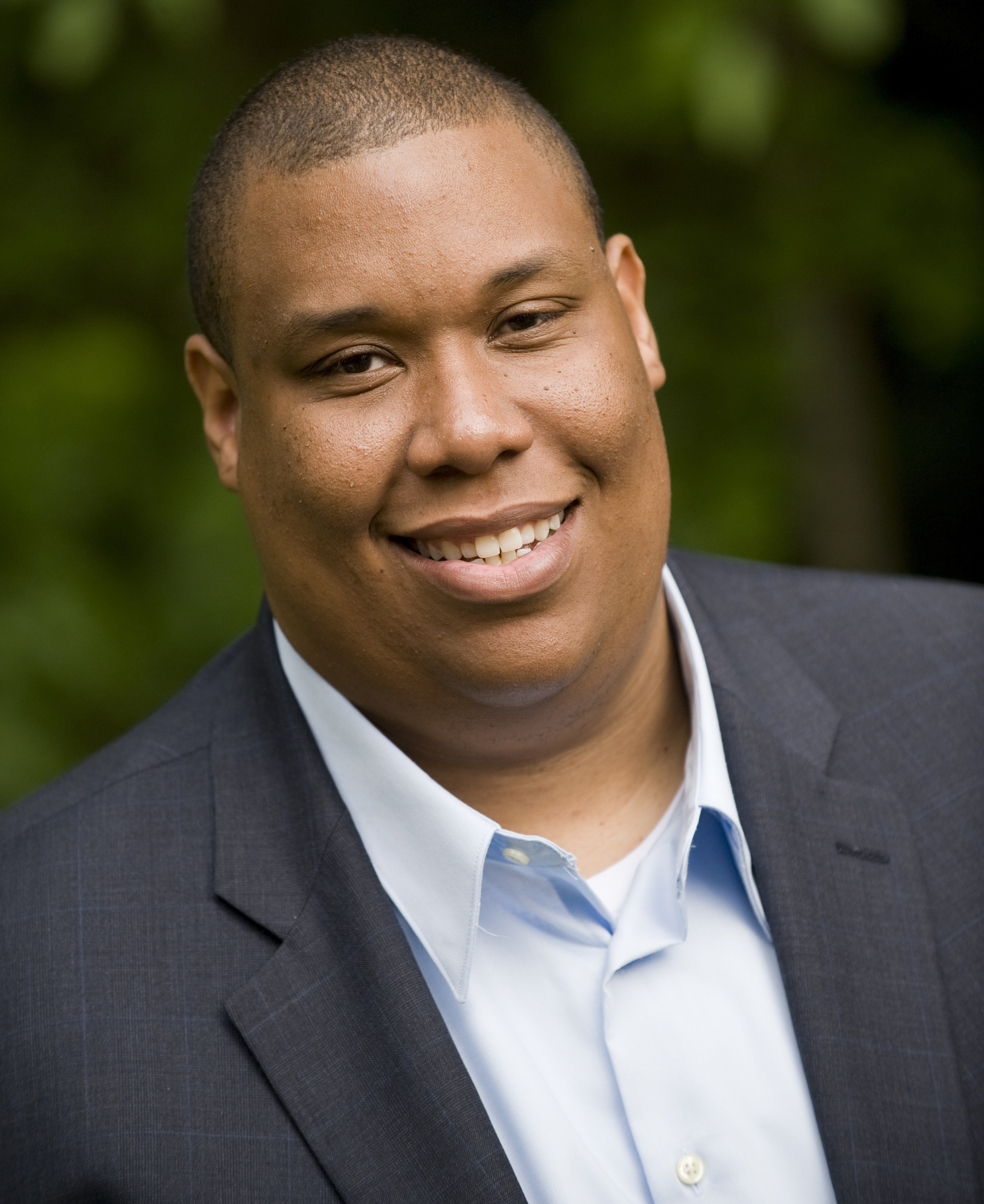
- Georgia House Minority Vice Chairman

Member of the Georgia House of Representatives from the 55th district
- In office January 12, 2009 – January 2013
- Preceded by: Mable Thomas
- Succeeded by: Tyrone Brooks

Personal details
- Born: March 21, 1981 (age 45) Washington, D.C.
- Party: Democratic
- Website: rashadtaylor.com

Rashad Jamal Taylor (born March 21, 1981) is a political consultant and former politician from Atlanta, Georgia. A Democrat, he served from 2009 to 2013 in the Georgia House of Representatives, representing the City of Atlanta from the 55th House District. He was first elected in November 2008. After re-election in 2010, he was elected Vice Chairman of the House Democratic Caucus, the fourth highest ranking leadership position in the House. At 31, Taylor was the youngest member of the General Assembly leadership, House or Senate, Democrat or Republican.

== Early life and career ==
Taylor was born and raised in Washington, D.C., where he graduated from Woodrow Wilson High School. He was selected for an internship via the Congressional Black Caucus College Internship Program, and interned in the office of Rep. John Lewis (D–Georgia) before moving to Atlanta where he attended college. He moved to Atlanta to attend Morehouse College, and also worked as a Finance Assistant for US Senator Max Cleland.

Taylor worked as a political consultant and campaign manager, managing the campaigns of Alisha Thomas Morgan, elected to the Georgia House in 2002, and Khaatim S. El, elected to the Atlanta Board of Education in 2003. In 2006, he became a lobbyist and legislative coordinator for Planned Parenthood of Georgia. In May 2006, Rashad Taylor was named one of ten Democratic "Rising Stars" in national politics by Campaigns and Elections. In June 2007, Taylor was appointed political director of the Democratic Party of Georgia, a position he held until joining the Legislature in January 2009.

In 2009, Rep. Taylor was deputy campaign manager for Atlanta Mayor Kasim Reed's mayoral campaign and worked on Mayor Reed's transition team. In 2010, Taylor managed the successful re-election campaign of Fulton County Commission Chairman John Eaves.

== In politics ==
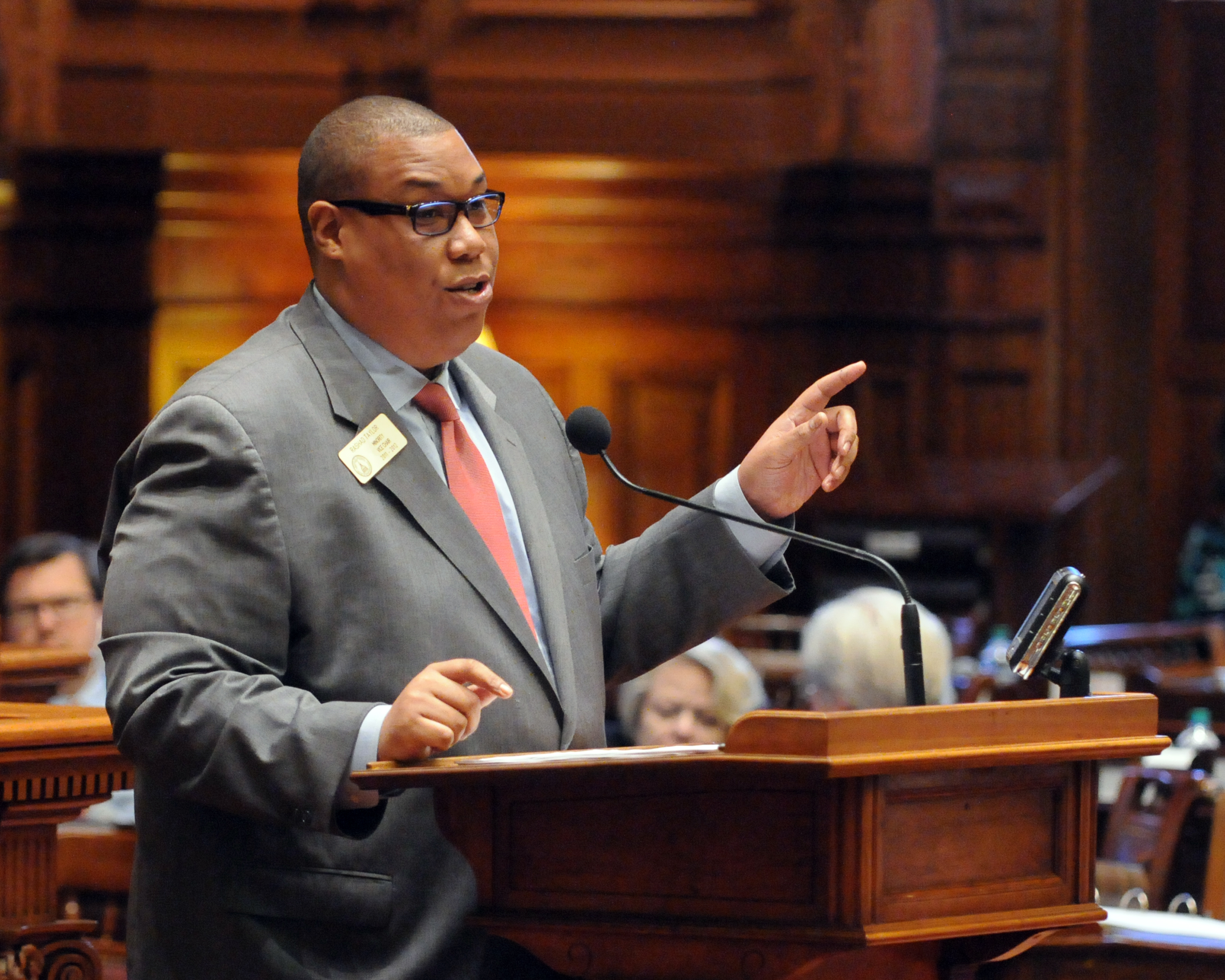
Rep. Rashad Taylor in 2012

In 2008, state representative Mable Thomas decided against seeking re-election, choosing instead to mount an unsuccessful primary challenge to John Lewis in the 5th congressional district. Her decision created an open seat in the Georgia House, which attracted two candidates, both Democrats, one of whom was Taylor. In the primary election held on July 15, 2008, Taylor earned 62.8% of the vote and won the Democratic nomination. He faced no opposition in the general election and took office on January 12, 2009. He ran for re-election in 2010, facing a primary challenge from Mable Thomas, his predecessor in office. In the Democratic primary election held on July 20, 2010, Taylor won 56.1%, winning by a margin of 349 votes. Once again, he won the general election unopposed. His second term expired in January 2013.

After re-election in 2010, Taylor was elected Vice Chairman of the House Democratic Caucus, handily defeating three other colleagues without a run-off election. Taylor was also appointed Chairman of the Atlanta-Fulton Legislative Delegation Subcommittee on Housing and Economic Development. Taylor sponsored legislation for the City of Atlanta to extend its hotel/motel tax to help fund the construction of a new Georgia Dome.

== Personal life ==
On May 27, 2011, Taylor came out as gay following the circulation of an e-mail that accused Taylor of being gay and of using his official position to solicit sexual relationships. Taylor's accuser later admitted he had no proof for his allegations.
