= Bryce Berry =

American politician (born 2001)

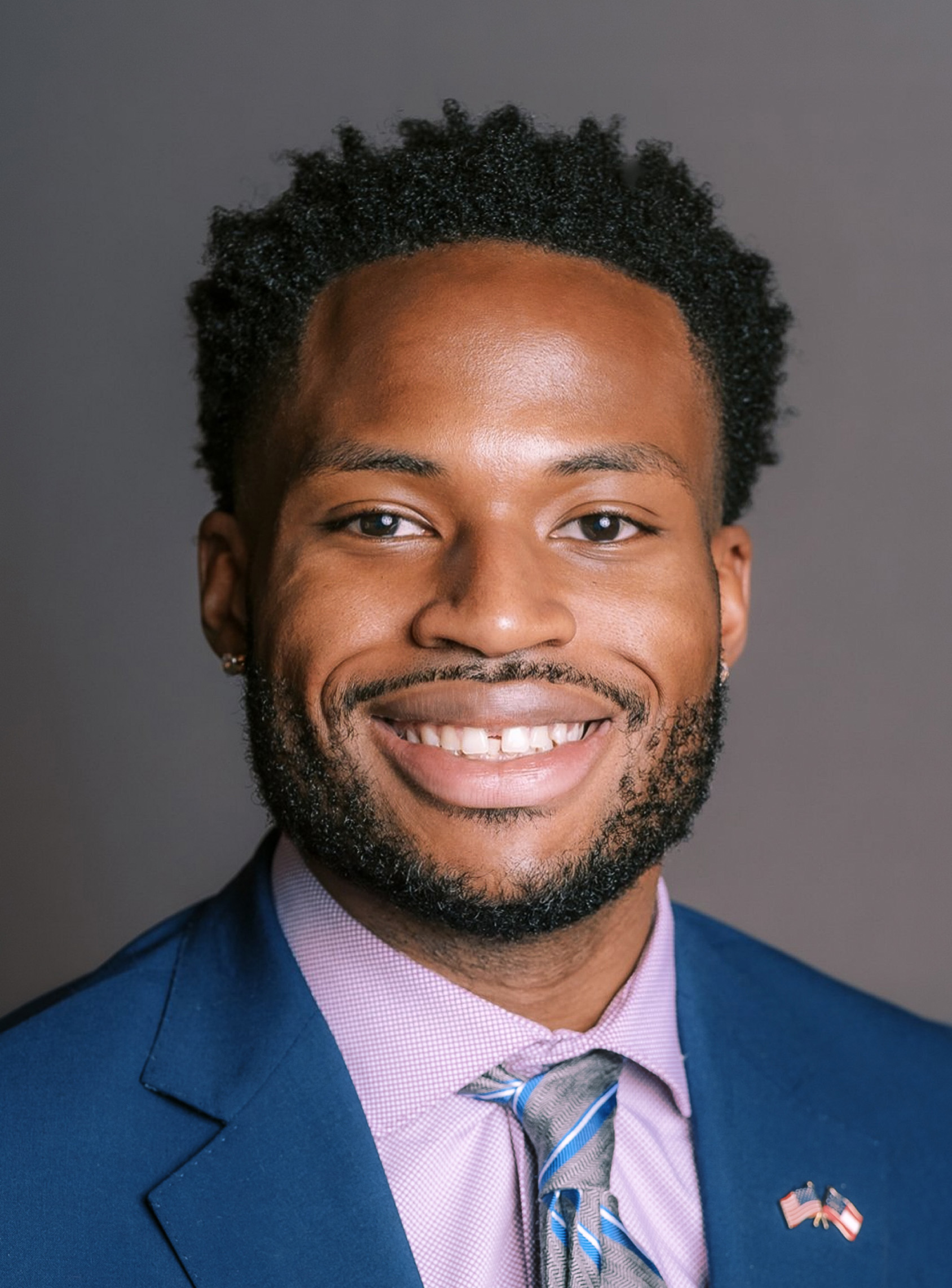

Member of the Georgia House of Representatives from the 56th district
- Incumbent
- Assumed office January 13, 2025
- Preceded by: Mesha Mainor

Personal details
- Born: June 16, 2001 (age 25)
- Party: Democratic
- Education: Morehouse College

Bryce Vernon Berry (born June 16, 2001) is an American politician and member of the Georgia House of Representatives for the 56th district. A member of the Democratic Party, he defeated incumbent Republican candidate Mesha Mainor in 2024. He graduated from Morehouse College and works as a math teacher at a public school in Atlanta.

Berry received 83.8% of votes in the 2024 general election against Mainor.
