= Richard Hely-Hutchinson =

Richard Hely-Hutchinson may refer to:

- Richard Hely-Hutchinson, 1st Earl of Donoughmore (1756–1825), Irish peer and politician
- Richard Hely-Hutchinson, 4th Earl of Donoughmore (1823–1866), Irish peer and Conservative politician
- Richard Hely-Hutchinson, 6th Earl of Donoughmore (1875–1948), Irish peer and politician
- Richard Hely-Hutchinson, 8th Earl of Donoughmore (born 1927), Irish peer

== See also ==
- Richard Hutchinson (disambiguation)
