= Mable Thomas =

American politician (born 1957)

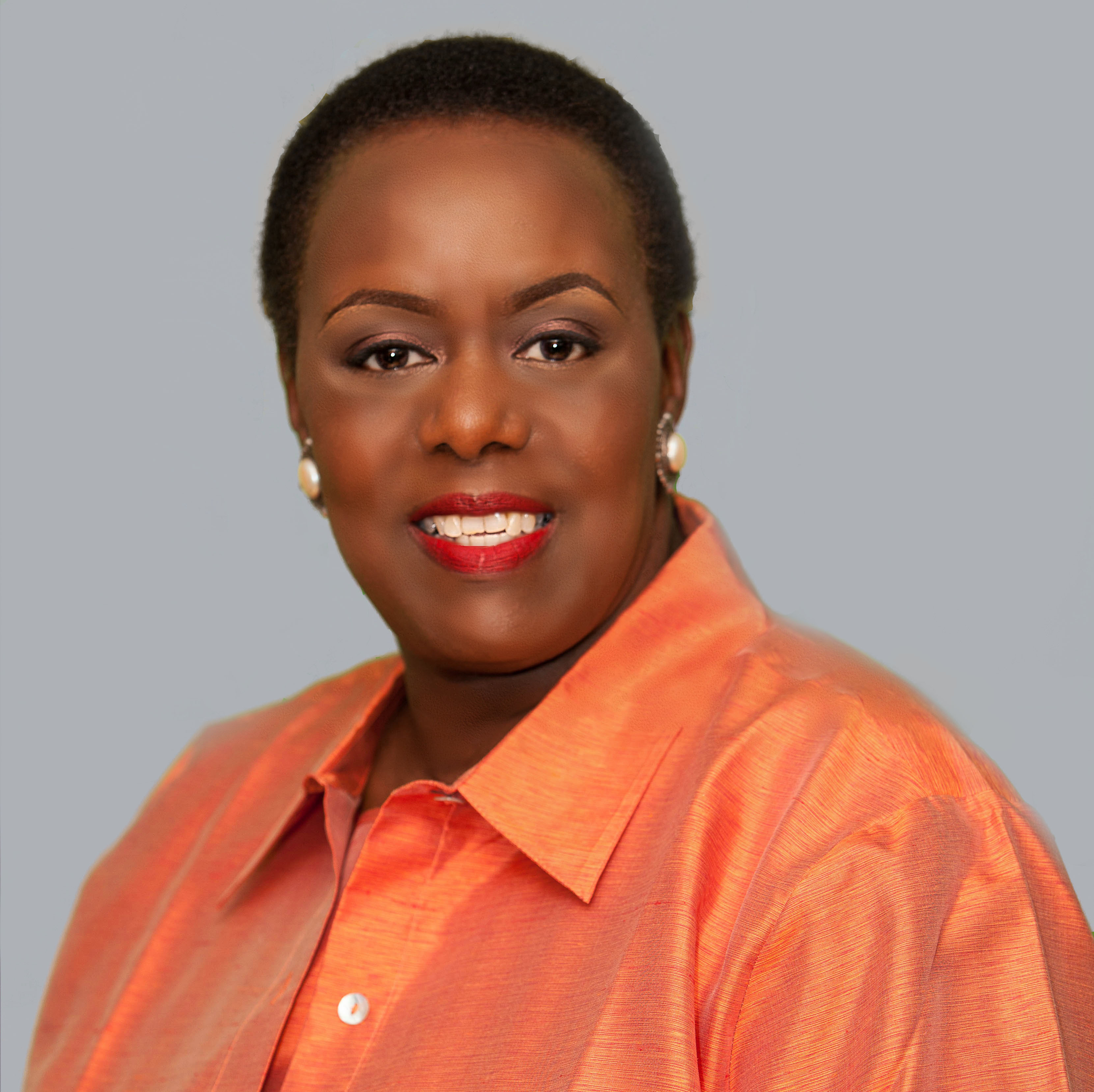

Member of the Georgia House of Representatives
- In office January 14, 2013 – January 11, 2021
- Preceded by: Kathy Ashe
- Succeeded by: Mesha Mainor
- Constituency: 56th district
- In office January 13, 2003 – January 12, 2009
- Succeeded by: Rashad Taylor
- Constituency: 43rd district (2003–2005); 55th district (2005–2009)
- In office January 14, 1985 – January 11, 1993
- Preceded by: Grace Towns Hamilton
- Constituency: 31st district

Member of the Atlanta City Council At-large Post 1
- In office 1997 – January 7, 2002
- Preceded by: Position established
- Succeeded by: Ceasar Mitchell

Personal details
- Born: November 8, 1957 (age 69) Atlanta, Georgia, U.S.
- Party: Democratic
- Education: Georgia State University (BS)

Mable Able Thomas (born November 8, 1957) is an American politician who served as a member of the Georgia House of Representatives for District 56. She previously represented District 55, which includes areas immediately west and southwest of Downtown Atlanta and areas west and northwest of Midtown Atlanta.

== Early life and education ==
The daughter of Bernard and Madie Thomas, Mable Thomas was born on November 8, 1957, and raised in the English Avenue neighborhood of Atlanta, Georgia, the youngest of five children. Her father was a boiler operator.

Thomas graduated from Booker T. Washington High School in 1975. She then earned a scholarship to Georgia State University to play for the Georgia State Panthers women's basketball team, and earned a Bachelor of Science in public administration in 1982.

== Career ==
Thomas' political career started when she was chosen as a presidential delegate for candidate Jesse Jackson at the 1984 Democratic National Convention. In the same year, she won a seat in the Georgia House of Representatives, defeating incumbent Grace Towns Hamilton in the Democratic primary, thus becoming the youngest member of the Georgia General Assembly. She served four terms. In 1997, she launched a successful campaign for a seat on the Atlanta City Council. In 2003, she returned to the Georgia House for six years.

In 1992 and 2008, Thomas challenged John Lewis to represent Georgia's 5th congressional district. Both times, Lewis defeated her in the Democratic primary. In July 2010, she ran for her old Georgia House seat but lost to Rashad Taylor in the primary. On October 27, 2019, Thomas announced her candidacy for United States Senate at the SisterSong Let's Talk about Sex Reproductive Justice conference. In March 2020, Thomas announced she would not seek re-election. After the death of incumbent Congressman John Lewis, Thomas was mentioned as a possible candidate to replace Lewis on the November general election ballot. State Senator and State Democratic Party Chair Nikema Williams was eventually selected to succeed Lewis on the November ballot. Thomas was a candidate for the special election to serve Lewis's full term in Congress, but did not advance to the December 2020 runoff election.

== Personal life ==
Thomas is often referred to by the nickname "Able" or "Able Mable", which was coined by a colleague around 1984. She later made it her legal middle name. Thomas is a member of the Cosmopolitan African Methodist Episcopal Church in Atlanta.
