= Eli Ginzberg =

American academic

Eli Ginzberg (April 30, 1911 – December 14, 2002) was born in New York City and earned an A.B., an A.M., and a Ph.D. from Columbia University between 1931 and 1934. He was son of Louis Ginzberg, Professor of Talmud, at the Jewish Theological Seminary of America in New York, and his wife Adele.

== Career ==
Ginzberg became a professor of economics at Columbia University in 1935. It was in this capacity that he became acquainted with General Dwight D. Eisenhower shortly after Eisenhower assumed the presidency there in 1948. Ginzberg and Eisenhower envisioned a project that would undertake extensive research of the military records documenting the rejection of two million men from active duty during World War II, with the intention of applying the findings to a variety of manpower problems in both military and civilian life. The Conservation of Human Resources Project became the fulfillment of that vision in 1950 when adequate funds were raised to get the study off of the ground." Having helped in the initiation of the project, Eisenhower secured Ginzberg's position as director of the project and placed Howard M. Snyder on the project's staff as an advisor prior to his departure from Columbia. Snyder came to replace Eisenhower as the chief fundraiser for the CHR project in the years that followed. He also came to be Eisenhower's continuing link to the project, often serving as a liaison between Ginzberg and the president.

== Publications ==
=== Books ===
- The House of Adam Smith (1934)
- Grass on the Slag Heaps: The Story of the Welsh Miners (1942)
- Agenda for American Jews (1950)
- Human Resources: The Wealth of a Nation (1958)
- The Nation's Children (1960) in 3 volumes, edited by Eli Ginzberg. Committee on Studies, the Golden Anniversary White House Conference on Children and Youth. New York: Columbia University Press.
- The Troublesome Presence: American Democracy and the Negro (1964), with Alfred S. Eichner.
- Keeper of the Law (1966)

Biography of his father.

- My Brother's Keeper (1989)

=== Book contributions ===
- Preface to Eisenhower at Columbia by Travis Beal Jacobs. New Brunswick, NJ: Transaction Publishers (2001). ISBN 978-0765800367. pp. ix-viii.

== See also ==
- Grace Towns Hamilton
- UK labour law
