= Mesha Mainor =

American politician (born 1975)

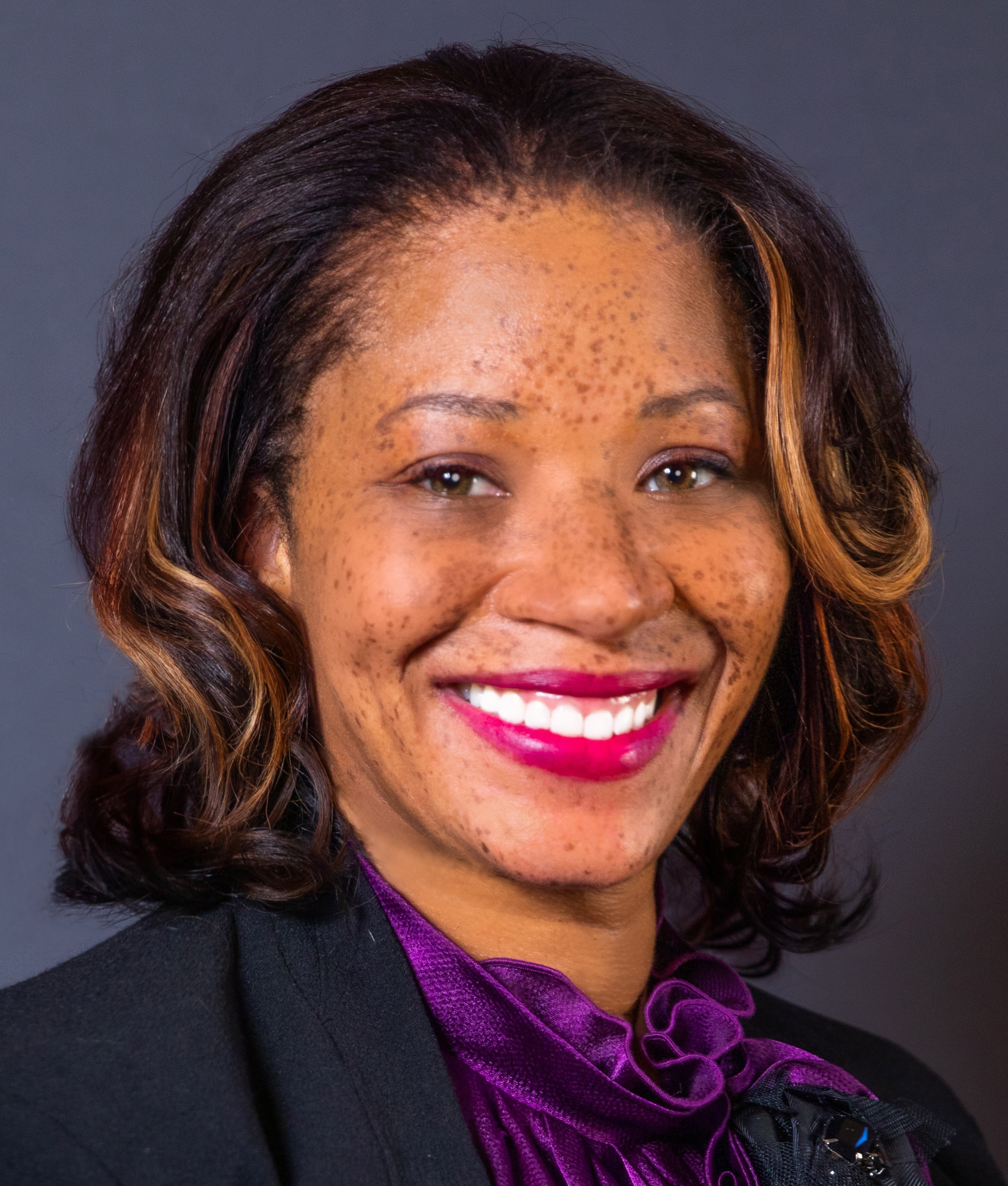

Member of the Georgia House of Representatives from the 56th district
- In office January 11, 2021 – January 13, 2025
- Preceded by: Mable Thomas
- Succeeded by: Bryce Berry

Personal details
- Born: May 17, 1975 (age 51) Atlanta, Georgia, U.S.
- Party: Democratic (until 2023); Republican (2023–present)
- Children: 2
- Education: Howard University (BS, MPT)
- Website: Campaign website

Mesha K. Mainor (born May 17, 1975) is an American politician who served as a member of the Georgia House of Representatives for the 56th district from 2021 to 2025.

On July 11, 2023, Mainor announced that she was leaving the Democratic Party for the Republican Party. She left due to her stances on "funding the police, public safety and education" that were at odds with the rest of her party. Mainor made history as the first Black Republican woman to serve in the Georgia House of Representatives.

== Early life and education ==
Of African-American heritage, Mainor was born in Atlanta, Georgia, and graduated from Benjamin Elijah Mays High School. She received a BS in Health Science and Master's degree in physical therapy at Howard University. As of 2023, Mainor is working on a doctorate in business administration at National University.

== Early Career ==
Mainor began her career in Washington, D.C. working with Congressman John Lewis. She later worked at the United States Agency for International Development in the Global Health division.

In 2000, she began working at the Centers for Disease Control and Prevention as a speechwriter and research analyst for Assistant Surgeon General Helene D. Gayle. In this role, she was responsible for foreign and domestic public-health presentations, legislative testimonies, film and radio productions, and co-authored journal articles.

In Atlanta, she has served the physical-therapy community in leadership positions at Emory Healthcare and Children’s Healthcare of Atlanta. She worked at Emory until 2019, when she resigned to run for the Atlanta City Council's District 3 special election. She also founded and trademarked the Junior Business League, a program to teach children entrepreneurship and advocacy.

== Georgia House of Representatives ==
As a member of the Georgia House, Mainor represented Midtown Atlanta, Ansley Park, Castleberry Hill, English Avenue, Atlantic Station, Hunter Hills, Vine City, Dixie Hills, Mozley Park, Sherwood Forest, West Midtown, West End, and the last residing neighborhood of Martin Luther King Jr. before he died, in the Sunset Avenue Historical District.

Mainor was the lead sponsor of HB 762 which created the Fulton Technology and Energy Authority to address the root causes of poverty in Fulton County by bridging the digital and energy divides, with broad powers to tackle various issues that impede improvements in struggling neighborhoods.

On July 11, 2023, Mainor announced that she was leaving the Democratic Party for the Republican Party. She left due to her stances on "funding the police, public safety and education" that were at odds with the rest of her party.

Mainor was defeated in the 2024 general election as a Republican to Democrat Bryce Berry.

== Post-state legislature ==
=== 2026 Georgia State Superintendent of Schools campaign ===
Mesha Mainor ran in the 2026 Georgia State Superintendent of Schools election primarying Republican incumbent Richard Woods. Mainor is being endorsed by the Georgia Republican Assembly and many of her colleagues from the Georgia General Assembly.

She was defeated in the Republican primary placing fourth with only 4.08% of the vote.

== Personal life ==
Mainor has two daughters who attended Atlanta Public Schools in Fulton County. She is an active member of a Baptist church in her community.

== See also ==
- List of American politicians who switched parties in office
