= Georgia's 56th House of Representatives district =

State district in Georgia, USA

Georgia's 56th State House of Representatives district
Representative
Bryce Berry; D–Atlanta
- Demographics: 30.0% White; 53.8% Black; 3.5% Hispanic; 10.0% Asian
- Population: 59,630

District 56 elects one member of the Georgia House of Representatives. It contains parts of Fulton County.

== Members ==
- Kathy B. Ashe (1991–2013)
- Mable Thomas (2013–2021)
- Mesha Mainor (2021–2025)
- Bryce Berry (since 2025)
