= J. D. Grier =

American religious and civil rights leader and politician

Georgia House of Representatives
- In office 1965–1966
- In office 1967–1968

Atlanta Personnel Board
- In office March 1970 – April 1973
- Preceded by: J. Marshall Weaver

Personal details
- Born: 1929/1930 Henry County, Georgia
- Died: February 4, 1998 Crawford W. Long Memorial Hospital, Atlanta, Georgia
- Cause of death: Complications from pneumonia
- Party: Democratic

J. D. Grier (1929/1930 – February 4, 1998), was a religious, civil rights, and political leader in Georgia. He served in the Georgia House of Representatives for two terms from 1965 to 1968. He chaired the Atlanta Personnel Board and was a member of the Atlanta civil service board. He was president of the Southern Christian Leadership Conference.

== Biography ==
Grier was born 1929 or 1930 in Henry County, Georgia to J. D. Grier Sr. He was educated at Morris Brown College where he obtained his degree in sociology then went to Gammon Theological Seminary for his masters in divinity. He was photographed giving his senior sermon in 1956 as part of his requirement for his seminary graduation.

He was elected May 1964 to the co-ordinating council of the Methodist Church at the Pittsburgh General Conference, he also returned to work as the pastor of the Fort Street Memorial United Methodist Church.

Grier qualified to run as a Democrat candidate for the 132nd district representing Fulton County, Georgia in the Georgia House of Representatives April 1965. Three black candidates stood unopposed, and four others were only opposed by other black candidates including Grier who stood against the Republican Mrs. Ella R. Martin. Grier was successful against Mrs. Martin, and was one of several black members elected to the house for the first time since 1907. Grier was one of several black members that later stated that they had been well received by the non-black member of the house. He ran again un-opposed in November 1966 for his second session in the house. In 1968 he co-introduced a bill with John Hood to outlaw burning crosses on both public and private property. After his second term he did not stand for re-election so that he could become the superintendent of the United Methodist Church.

In a press conference on September 13, 1966 he insisted the Housing Authority make apartments available to "negros" in all parts of the city to alleviate overcrowding and improve conditions. He also called for a recreation center, playground, and jobs. In 1967 he was part of a panel with state senator Leroy Johnson and attorneys Horace T. Ward and William H. Alexander that called for action from the Board of Education in Atlanta.

He was a member and former president of the Southern Christian Leadership Conference and worked with Martin Luther King Jr. and others in the leadership.

In March 1970 he was appointed as one of three members of the Atlanta Personnel Board by Mayor Sam Massell.

He appeared with Joseph Lowery and Atlanta police chief John Inman at a press conference calling for the hiring of more black police officers in 1973.

Grier died February 4, 1998 aged 68, he had been suffering with pneumonia. He had been married to Henrietta Johnson Grier and had two children, Lisa G. Newton Williams and Joseph D. Grier III.

== See also ==
- 128th Georgia General Assembly
- Georgia Legislative Black Caucus
