= Adele Ginzberg =

American Conservative Jewish leader

Adele Katzenstein Ginzberg (May 11, 1886 – May 10, 1980) was an American leader in Conservative Judaism.

Born Adele Katzenstein in Frankfurt, Ginzberg was the daughter of Michael and Sophie Katzenstein; she was the eldest of three, with one brother, Max, and one sister, Martha. At eight she moved to Berlin after her mother died suddenly. She received a basic education, but was unable to study nursing, which was her desire; instead, she took a position in her father's real estate office. In 1909 she married Louis Ginzberg and moved with him to New York. The couple had two children, Sophie (later Gould) and Eli.

Adele Ginzberg was for many years a monthly columnist for Outlook, the magazine of the National Women's League; it was she who initiated creation of what later became the Menorah Award badge for the Girl Scouts. She was a vocal supporter of women's equal participation in the ritual of the synagogue. With her husband, she took on the unofficial post of "Mr. and Mrs. Seminary" at the Jewish Theological Seminary, succeeding Solomon and Mathilde Roth Schechter; in this capacity the couple hosted open houses on Shabbat and on holidays. Ginzberg received numerous awards during her career; in 1966 she was named New York State Mother of the Year, and ten years later she was made a member of the Seminary's Honorary Society of Fellows. In 1980 she was posthumously awarded the Mathilde Schechter Award for her accomplishments.
