= Robert Evensen =

Norwegian football defender (born 1982)

Personal information
- Date of birth: 28 August 1982 (age 44)
- Height: 1.94 m (6 ft 4 1/2 in)
- Position: Defender

Team information
- Current team: Sprint-Jeløy (on loan)

Youth career
- Moss

Senior career*
Years	Team	Apps	(Gls)
2002–2003	Moss		
2004–2014	Sprint-Jeløy		
2015–	Tronvik		
2015	→ Sprint-Jeløy (loan)		
- * Club domestic league appearances and goals

Robert Evensen (born 28 August 1982) is a Norwegian football defender.

After a stint in Moss FK, where he played in the 2002 Tippeligaen and featured for the Norwegian under-21 team, he joined minnows SK Sprint-Jeløy ahead of the 2004 season. In 2015, he joined Tronvik, but rejoined Sprint on loan in the summer.

He is an electrician by profession.
