= J. C. Maddox =

American politician

Member of the Georgia House of Representatives
- In office January 10, 1983 – January 12, 1987
- Preceded by: Ernest Ralston
- Succeeded by: James Beverly Langford
- Constituency: 7th district
- In office January 11, 1965 – January 9, 1967
- Preceded by: Troy Causby
- Succeeded by: Thomas Lawrence Shanahan
- Constituency: Gordon County (1965–1966); 8th district (1966–1967)

Personal details
- Born: Jessie Cleveland Maddox; April 5, 1932 Jackson, Georgia, U.S.
- Died: January 29, 2009 (aged 76) Calhoun, Georgia, U.S.
- Party: Democratic
- Spouse: Dorothy Powers (m. 1955)
- Children: 2
- Education: West Georgia College; University of Georgia (BS); Atlanta's John Marshall Law School (LLB)

Military service
- Allegiance: United States
- Branch/service: United States Coast Guard
- Years of service: 1951–1954

Jessie Cornelius Maddox (April 5, 1932 – January 29, 2009) was an American politician who served two separate stints in the Georgia House of Representatives.

== Early life and education ==
Maddox was born in Jackson, Georgia, in 1932. He graduated from Porterdale High School in 1949.

After three years of service in the United States Coast Guard, Maddox briefly attended West Georgia College, and then earned his Bachelor of Science from the University of Georgia in 1957. In 1961, he obtained his Bachelor of Laws degree from Atlanta's John Marshall Law School. That year, he became a partner at his law own office, the Chance & Maddox Firm.

== Political career ==
A Democrat, Maddox was first elected to the Georgia House of Representatives in 1964. He served a single term, midway through which the state redistricted to better equalize population across districts.

After leaving office, Maddox continued to practice law and served as a judge on the Cherokee Judicial Circuit in 1978. He also served as Chairman of the Gordon County Board of Commissioners.

Maddox returned to the state house in 1982, serving an additional two terms. In his final term, he sat on three committees: Banks & Banking, Special Judiciary, and Transportation.

== Personal life ==
Maddox died on January 29, 2009, at Gordon Hospital in Calhoun, Georgia. He was survived by his wife of 54 years.
