= Louis Ginzberg =

Russian-born American Conservative rabbi and Talmudic scholar (1873-1953)

- Louis Ginzberg in 1921

Personal life
- Born: November 28, 1873 Kaunas, Vilna Governorate, Russian Empire
- Died: November 11, 1953 (aged 79) New York City, United States
- Children: Eli Ginzberg

Religious life
- Religion: Judaism
- Denomination: Conservative

Louis Ginzberg (Hebrew: לוי גינצבורג, Levy Gintzburg; Russian: Леви Гинцберг, Levy Ginzberg; November 28, 1873 – November 11, 1953) was a Russian-born American rabbi and Talmudic scholar of Lithuanian-Jewish descent, contributing editor to numerous articles of The Jewish Encyclopedia (1906), and leading figure in the Conservative movement of Judaism during the early 20th century.

== Early life ==
Ginzberg was born in Kaunas, Vilna Governorate (then called Kovno). His religious Lithuanian-Jewish family's piety and erudition were renowned, seeing that they traced their lineage back to the Gaon of Vilna's brother. Ginzberg received a traditional Jewish education, and later studied in German universities.

== Career ==
Ginzberg first arrived in the United States in 1899. He began teaching the Talmud at the Jewish Theological Seminary of America (JTS) from its reorganization in 1902 until his death in 1953. During this time, he trained two generations of future Conservative rabbis, influencing almost every rabbi of the Conservative movement in a personal way. Ginzberg was highly praised by his colleagues; JTS leader Louis Finkelstein described him as a "living symbol of love for Torah". Leading Israeli Conservative posek David Golinkin has written prolifically on Ginzberg and published a collection of his responsa.

Ginzberg's knowledge made him the expert to defend Judaism both in national and international affairs. In 1906, he defended the Jewish community against antisemitic accusations that Jews ritually slaughtered Gentiles. In 1913, Louis Marshall requested that Ginzberg refute the Beilis blood libel charge in Kiev. On account of his impressive scholarship in Jewish studies, Ginzberg was one of 66 scholars honored with a doctorate by Harvard University in celebration of its tercentenary in 1936.

== Views ==
In his opening address to students, Ginzberg spoke of the need to keep Conservative Jewry under the rubric of Halakha.

The conception that in religious matters anyone, however ignorant, can judge for himself, is the direct denial of the old Jewish maxim, 'The ignorant cannot be pious' (Avot 2:5) ... The majority vote of a Board of Directors of a synagogue is, after all, a negligible quantity when it is in opposition to the vote of historical Judaism with its myriad of Saints and thousands of Sages ... The sorting, distributing, selecting, harmonizing and completing can only be done by experienced hands.

Ginzberg's initiative to make halakhic decisions with law committees of rabbis, rather than with laypeople, is the method the Conservative movement describes as its present approach to this day.

In 1918, at the Sixth Annual Convention, Ginzberg, as the acting president, declared that United Synagogue of Conservative Judaism stood for "historical Judaism" and thus elaborated:

Now let us understand the exact meaning of the expression historical Judaism ... Looking at Judaism from a historical point of view, we become convinced that there is no one aspect deep enough to exhaust the content of such a complex phenomenon as Judaism ... Accordingly, Torah-less Judaism ... would be an entirely new thing and not the continuation of something given ...

Ginzberg sought to emulate the Vilna Gaon's intermingling of "academic knowledge" in Torah studies under the label "historical Judaism"; for example, in his book Students, Scholars and Saints, Ginzberg quotes the Vilna Gaon's instruction, "Do not regard the views of the Shulchan Aruch as binding if you think that they are not in agreement with those of the Talmud."

In 1943, Ginzberg predicted that after the war, only two centers of Jewish culture would remain in the world: The United States and Palestine—with the latter depending upon the former for support. He foresaw problems for the Jews remaining in Europe due to their being perceived as those who caused Germany to lose the war.

== Responsa ==
One of Ginzberg's responsa concerns the use of wine in the Jewish community during the Prohibition Era. The Eighteenth Amendment to the United States Constitution, ratified on January 16, 1920, declared that "the manufacture, sale, or transportation of intoxicating liquors within ... the United States ... for beverage purposes is hereby prohibited." The subsequent Volstead Act defined "intoxicating liquors" and provided for several exceptions, one of which as for sacramental use. The Christian Church was able to successfully regulate the use of ceremonial wine. The clergy could easily monitor the nominal amount of sacramental wine that each worshipper drank, especially because it was usually drunk only in Church and only on Sundays (for the communion or Eucharist ceremony). This was not the case for the Jews, who needed a greater quantity of wine per person. Furthermore, the wine was drunk in the privacy of the home on Shabbat, Jewish holidays, weddings, and brit milah (circumcision) ceremonies. This alone would have made the regulation of ceremonial wine complicated. It was not difficult for crooks to rig illegal "wine synagogues" to trick the government to receive their wine which would then be bootlegged.

While contemporary Orthodox Jewish authorities are generally permissive of grape juice as a wine substitute, Orthodox rabbis of the 1920s soundly rejected its use. The Reform movement in 1920 proclaimed that grape juice be used instead of wine to eliminate future complaints. Shortly afterwards, on January 24, 1922, the Conservative movement publicized the 71-page response written by Ginzberg tackling the halakhic aspects of drinking grape juice instead of wine in light of the historical circumstances. Besides Ginzberg's well-grounded decision to permit grape juice, he includes meta-halakhic reasoning:

The decision of the author of Magen Abraham that the commandment is honored best by the use of old wine is rejected. Even this authority would admit that it is better to pronounce the kiddush over new wine than to desecrate the Divine Name and to disgrace the Jewish people, and we well know the damage caused the Jewish people by the trafficking in sacramental wine.

At the time of Ginzburg's responsum, the Orthodox rabbinate had exclusive authority to sanction sacramental wine for Jews, and the responsum was thought by the Orthodox community to be tainted by self-interest.

== Works ==
Ginzberg was the author of a number of scholarly Jewish works, including a commentary on the Jerusalem Talmud and his six-volume (plus a one-volume index) The Legends of the Jews (1909), which combined hundreds of legends and parables from a lifetime of midrash research. The Legends of the Jews is an original synthesis of a vast amount of aggadah from all of classical rabbinic literature, as well as apocryphal, pseudopigraphical and even early Christian literature, with legends ranging from the creation of the world and the fall of Adam, through a huge collection of legends on Moses, and ending with the story of Esther and the Jews in Persia.

Ginzberg also write Geonica (1909), an account of the Babylonian Geonim containing lengthy extracts from their responsa, as discovered in the form of fragments in the Cairo Genizah. He continued this work in the similar collection entitled Ginze Schechter (1929).

Ginzberg wrote 406 articles and several monograph-length entries for the Jewish Encyclopedia (Levy 2002), some later collected in his Legend and Lore. He was also founder and president of the American Academy of Jewish Research.

Many of his halakhic responsa are collected in The Responsa of Professor Louis Ginzberg, edited by David Golinkin.

== Personal life ==
Ginzberg had a long-term platonic relationship with Henrietta Szold, his editor at the Jewish Publication Society. She was in love with him but 13 years his senior.

Ginzberg visited Berlin in 1908 and became engaged to Adele Katzenstein while there. Katzenstein was about 22 at the time. They had two children: a son, Eli Ginzberg (1911–2002), who was a professor of economics at Columbia University, and a daughter, Sophie Ginzberg Gould (1914–1985).
