= Joe T. Wood =

American politician (1922–2019)

Member of the Georgia House of Representatives
- In office January 10, 1966 – January 9, 1989
- Preceded by: District established
- Succeeded by: E. Wycliffe Orr
- Constituency: 16th district (1966–1969); 11th district (1969–1973); 9th district (1973–1989)

Personal details
- Born: Joe Terrell Wood; October 23, 1922 Gainesville, Georgia, U.S.
- Died: April 27, 2019 (aged 96) Gainesville, Georgia, U.S.
- Party: Democratic
- Spouse: Helen Thrasher (m. 1942; died 1997)
- Children: 1
- Education: University of Georgia

Military service
- Allegiance: United States
- Branch/service: United States Army
- Battles/wars: World War II

Joe Terrell Wood Sr. (October 23, 1922 – April 27, 2019) was an American politician in the state of Georgia. Wood served in the United States Army during World War II. He was an alumnus of the University of Georgia and worked in the field of general insurance. He was a member of the firm Turner Wood & Smith Insurance, in Gainesville. Wood served in the Georgia House of Representatives from 1966 to 1989 and was a Democrat. He was married to Helen Thrasher. Wood died on April 27, 2019.
