= J. Terrell Webb =

American politician

Member of the Georgia House of Representatives
- In office 1966–1967

Personal details
- Born: July 11, 1930 Tattnall County, Georgia, U.S.
- Died: June 29, 2014 (aged 83)
- Party: Republican
- Education: University of Georgia

J. Terrell Webb (July 11, 1930 – June 29, 2014) was an American politician. He served as a Republican member of the Georgia House of Representatives.

== Life and career ==
Webb was born in Tattnall County, Georgia. He attended the University of Georgia.

Webb served in the Georgia House of Representatives from 1966 to 1967.

Webb died on June 29, 2014, at the age of 83.
