= David N. Vaughan Jr. =

American politician

Member of the Georgia House of Representatives
- In office 1965–1968

Personal details
- Born: February 2, 1935 Gordon County, Georgia, U.S.
- Died: June 11, 2020 (aged 85)
- Party: Democratic
- Education: North Georgia College; University of Georgia

David N. Vaughan Jr. (February 2, 1935 – June 11, 2020) was an American politician. He served as a Democratic Party member of the Georgia House of Representatives.

== Life and career ==
Vaughan was born in Gordon County, Georgia. He attended North Georgia College and the University of Georgia.

Vaughan served in the Georgia House of Representatives from 1965 to 1968.

Vaughan died on June 11, 2020, at the age of 85.
