= James Roy McCracken =

US politician

Member of the Georgia House of Representatives
- In office January 14, 1935 – January 13, 1975
- Preceded by: John P. Rabun
- Succeeded by: District abolished
- Constituency: Jefferson County (1935–1966); 49th district (1966–1969); 36th district (1969–1973); 77th district (1973–1975)

Personal details
- Born: December 26, 1903 Avera, Georgia, U.S.
- Died: January 22, 1979 (aged 75) Augusta, Georgia, U.S.
- Party: Democratic
- Spouse: Rosa Kirbo (m. 1937)
- Children: 2
- Education: Mercer University (LLM)

James Roy McCracken (December 26, 1903 – January 22, 1979) was an American politician and attorney from Georgia. He served 40 years in the Georgia House of Representatives, making him the fourth-longest ever serving member of that body.

== Early life and education ==
McCracken was born in 1903 in Avera, Georgia. Both of his grandfathers were Confederate soldiers who served during the Civil War.

In 1925, McCracken earned his Master of Laws from Mercer University. He began practicing law in Louisville, Georgia, in April 1931.

== Political career ==
McCracken entered politics by serving as Mayor of Avera from 1933 to 1934, during which time he also served as chairman of the Avera school board.

In 1934, McCracken ran for and won an election to the Georgia House of Representatives from his native Jefferson County. He served in the chamber continuously until 1975. At the time he left office, McCracken had served longer in the chamber than any other individual. His record has since been surpassed by Calvin Smyre, Tom Murphy, Bill Lee, and Gerald Greene. While in office, he practiced law as an attorney with Harris, Chance & McCracken in Augusta.

== Death ==
McCracken died in Augusta on January 22, 1979. He was survived by his wife Rosa, who died in 1999.
