= Reid W. Harris =

American politician

Member of the Georgia House of Representatives
- In office 1965–1970

Personal details
- Born: July 6, 1930 Glynn County, Georgia, U.S.
- Died: October 16, 2010 (aged 80)
- Party: Democratic
- Education: University of North Carolina at Chapel Hill; Emory University

Reid W. Harris (July 6, 1930 – October 16, 2010) was an American politician. He served as a Democratic member of the Georgia House of Representatives.

== Life and career ==
Harris was born in Glynn County, Georgia. He attended the University of North Carolina at Chapel Hill and Emory University.

Harris was a Brunswick attorney.

Harris served in the Georgia House of Representatives from 1965 to 1970.

Harris died 9n October 16, 2010, at the age of 80.
