= Thomas A. Roach =

American politician (1924–2021)

Member of the Georgia State Senate from 39th district
- In office 1959–1960

Member of the Georgia House of Representatives
- In office 1966–1974

Personal details
- Born: March 13, 1924 Cherokee County, Georgia, U.S.
- Died: March 4, 2021 (aged 96)
- Party: Democratic
- Education: West Georgia College; Mercer University

Thomas A. Roach (March 13, 1924 – March 4, 2021) was an American politician. He served as a Democratic member of the Georgia House of Representatives. He also served as a member for the 39th district of the Georgia State Senate.

== Life and career ==
Roach was born in Cherokee County, Georgia. He attended West Georgia College and Mercer University.

In 1959, Roach was elected to represent the 39th district of the Georgia State Senate, serving until 1960. In 1966, he was elected to the Georgia House of Representatives, serving until 1974.

Roach died on March 4, 2021, at the age of 96.
