= Lawrence Shields (politician) =

American politician (died 1976)

Member of the Georgia House of Representatives
- In office 1966–1968
- In office 1945–1949

Mayor of Columbus, Georgia
- In office 1952–1953

Personal details
- Born: I. Lawrence Shields Thomson, Georgia, U.S.
- Died: October 9, 1976 (aged 82) Columbus, Georgia, U.S.
- Resting place: Parkhill Cemetery; Columbus, Georgia, U.S.
- Spouse: Reba Meadows (m. 1930)
- Children: 3
- Occupation: Politician; theater manager

I. Lawrence Shields (died October 9, 1976) was an American politician from Georgia. He was a member of the Georgia House of Representatives and served as mayor of Columbus, Georgia.

== Early life ==
I. Lawrence Shields was born on July 1, 1894, in Thomson, Georgia, to Georgia Anna and Octavious Shields. He graduated from Thomson High School in 1911.

== Career ==
Shields began his service in the Special Training Detachment at the University of Georgia in April 1918. In July 1918 he was transferred to Camp Meade, Maryland, and in the same month from Philadelphia, Pennsylvania via Romsey and Southampton in England, shipped to Le Havre in France. There he served as a private in Company E of the 304th Ammunition Train. He served in World War I. He was a member of the American Expeditionary Forces in France and served during the Meuse-Argonne Offensive. Starting in the 1920s, he was active in the theater scene. In 1930, he managed seven theaters in Columbus, Georgia, and surrounding cites. By 1946, he was city manager of six theaters in Columbus.

Shields was a Democrat. He served as Post I, District III representative in the Georgia House of Representatives, representing Muscogee County, from 1945 to 1949 and from 1966 to 1968. He was a member of the ways and means committee, committee on banks and banking and the committee of the state of the republic.

Shields was elected as city commissioner of Columbus in 1951 and served one term. From 1952 he was a member of the Columbus City Commission. In the same year, he held the office of mayor pro tempore under Mayor B.F. Register. He served as mayor of Columbus from 1952 to 1953. In 1965, he was appointed to the Columbus Safety Board.

Shields was a life member of the Civilian Military Council and served on the USO Board. He was a captain of the Georgia State Guard of Muscogee County.

== Personal life ==
Shields divorced in 1928 and had one child from that marriage. He married Reba Meadows, daughter of W. S. Meadows of Glennville, on September 8, 1930. They had two daughters, Reba June and Syliva. He was a member of Rose Hill Baptist Church and was a member of the American Legion.

Shields died on October 9, 1976, aged 82, at St. Francis Hospital in Columbus. He was buried at Parkhill Cemetery in Columbus.
