= Charles L. Carnes =

American judge and politician

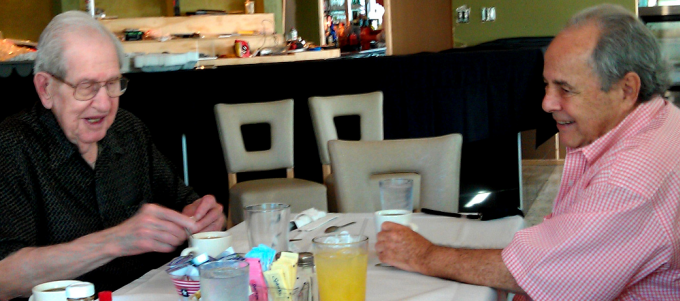
- Carnes (left) with his friend, 2011

Member of the Georgia House of Representatives
- In office 1966–1980

Personal details
- Born: December 14, 1926 Murray County, Georgia, U.S.
- Died: October 14, 2013 (aged 86)
- Party: Democratic
- Education: University of Georgia; Woodrow Wilson School of Law
- Occupation: Judge

Charles L. Carnes (December 14, 1926 – October 14, 2013) was an American judge and politician. He served as a Democratic member of the Georgia House of Representatives.

== Life and career ==
Carnes was born in Murray County, Georgia. He attended the University of Georgia and Woodrow Wilson School of Law.

Carnes served in the Georgia House of Representatives from 1966 to 1980.

Carnes was a chief judge of the Fulton County State Court during the 1990s.

Carnes died on October 14, 2013, at the age of 86.
