= Legends of the Jews =

1909 compilation by Louis Ginzberg

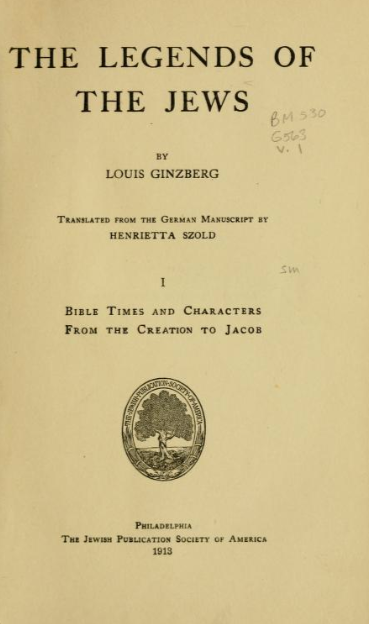
- Title page for Legends of the Jews (1913)
- Author: Louis Ginzberg
- Translator: Henrietta Szold
- Language: German; English
- Subject: Biblical legends
- Genre: Legend, religion
- Published: 1909
- Publication place: United States

Legends of the Jews is a chronological compilation of aggadah (folklore found in rabbinic literature) from hundreds of biblical legends in Mishnah, Talmud and Midrash. The compilation consists of seven volumes (four volumes of narrative texts and two volumes of footnotes with a volume of index) synthesized by Louis Ginzberg in a manuscript written in the German language. In 1913, it was translated into English by Henrietta Szold. It was published in Philadelphia by the Jewish Publication Society of America from 1909 to 1938.

== Structure ==
The narrative is divided into four main volumes, Volume I covering the period from the Creation to Jacob; Volume II covering the period from Joseph to the Exodus; Volume III covering the period from the Exodus to the death of Moses; and Volume IV covering the period from Joshua to Esther.

- Volume 1: Bible Times and Characters from the Creation to Jacob
- Volume 2: Bible Times and Characters from Joseph to the Exodus
- Volume 3: Bible Times and Characters from the Exodus to the Death of Moses
- Volume 4: Bible Times and Characters from Joshua to Esther
- Volume 5: Notes to Volumes 1 and 2
- Volume 6: Notes to Volumes 3 and 4
- Volume 7: Index

== Reactions and influence ==
According to Ginzberg's son Eli, Clarence Darrow consulted Ginzberg while preparing for the Scopes Trial in order to find out who Cain had married, a subject on which Darrow later cross-examined William Jennings Bryan during the trial. Ginzberg referred Darrow to the Legends of the Jews, which relates legends about Cain's wife having been one of Adam and Eve's daughters not mentioned in the Bible.

Nahum Glatzer wrote in 1956, "The first four volumes of ... Legends of the Jews, which present the non-legal traditions of the Talmud and the Midrash, make pleasurable reading, which does not prevent the two volumes of 'Notes' that follow them from being documents of meticulous research into the original texts and their variants, as well as into general and Jewish folklore, into comparative religion and ancient Near Eastern thought." In 2014, Benjamin Ivry wrote, "If any work of stunning erudition can be called loveable, then surely Legends retains this allure. ... [T]he work and its author have attracted ecstatic praise."

In 2009, the Legends of the Jews was the subject of a colloquium held by the World Association for Jewish Studies, papers from which were published as Louis Ginzberg's Legends of the Jews: Ancient Jewish Folk Literature Reconsidered. In 2019, painter Joel Silverstein presented an exhibition of paintings inspired by Ginzberg's work, titled The Ginzberg Variations.

== See also ==
- Jewish folklore

== Bibliography ==
- The Legends of the Jews Vol. 1, 2, 3, 4 at Project Gutenberg
- "The Legends of the Jews". Online Books Page.
- Legends of the Jews (PDF)
- The Legends of the Jews; HathiTrust
