= Frank Eldridge Jr. =

American politician

Member of the Georgia State Senate from the 7th district
- In office 1965–1982
- Succeeded by: Ed Perry

Personal details
- Born: July 29, 1932 Ware County, Georgia, U.S.
- Died: February 4, 2006 (aged 73)
- Party: Democratic
- Spouse: Leland Eldridge
- Children: 2
- Education: Gordon State College

Frank Eldridge Jr. (July 29, 1932 – February 4, 2006) was an American politician. He served as a Democratic member for the 7th district of the Georgia State Senate.

== Life and career ==
Eldridge was born in Ware County, Georgia. He attended Gordon State College.

In 1965, Eldridge was elected to represent the 7th district of the Georgia State Senate. He served until 1982, when he was succeeded by Ed Perry. In 1993, he was appointed by Pierre Howard to complete Hamilton McWhorter’s unfinished term as the Senate's secretary.

Eldridge died in February 2006 of a heart attack, at the age of 73.
