= Albert Thompson (Georgia politician) =

American politician

Member of the Georgia House of Representatives for District 110-2

Personal details
- Born: June 29, 1922
- Died: December 26, 2004 Columbus, Georgia
- Profession: lawyer

Albert William Thompson (June 29, 1922 –December 26, 2004) was an American politician and jurist for the state of Georgia. In 1965, he became one of the first African Americans to serve in the desegregated Georgia House of Representatives, and continued to serve seven terms. He later servied as a Superior Court judge in Georgia.

== Education and military service ==
During World War II, Thompson served in North Africa and Europe with the 41st Combat Engineers. Receiving his undergraduate degree from Savannah State College in 1942 and his law degree from Howard University School of Law.

== Career ==
In 1951, Thompson became the first African American admitted to the bar in Columbus, Georgia.

In 1965 he became one of the first African-Americans elected to the Georgia House of Representatives, representing district 110–2 in Muscogee County. In 1974, he also became the first African-American chair of a Georgia House of Representatives committee, the House Special Judiciary Committee. In 1980 he was appointed a Superior Court Judge, again becoming the first African-American state-appointed judge in Georgia history, and retired in 1991 as an Administrative Law Judge. He died in 2004 and is buried at Riverdale Cemetery in Columbus.
