= Benjamin D. Brown (Georgia politician) =

American politician

Member of the Georgia House of Representatives
- In office 1966–1967
- In office 1969–1976

Personal details
- Born: November 14, 1939 Macon County, Georgia, U.S.
- Died: February 1, 1999 (aged 59)
- Party: Democratic
- Education: Clark College; Howard University

Benjamin D. Brown (November 14, 1939 – February 1, 1999) was an American politician. He served as a Democratic member of the Georgia House of Representatives.

== Life and career ==
Brown was born in Macon County, Georgia. He attended South Fulton High School, Clark College and Howard University.

Brown served in the Georgia House of Representatives from 1966 to 1967 and again from 1969 to 1976.

Brown died on February 1, 1999, at the age of 59.

== See also ==
- Georgia Legislative Black Caucus
