= Dick Hutchinson =

Australian rules footballer

Personal information
- Full name: Dick Hutchinson
- Born: 17 February 1890
- Died: 1 June 1977 (aged 87)

Playing career^{1}
| Years | Club | Games (Goals) |
| 1917 | South Melbourne | 11 (17) |
- ^{1} Playing statistics correct to the end of 1917.

Dick Hutchinson (17 February 1890 – 1 June 1977) was an Australian rules footballer who played with South Melbourne in the Victorian Football League (VFL).
