= 2004 United States House of Representatives elections in Georgia =

- November 2, 2004

All 13 Georgia seats to the United States House of Representatives
	Majority party	Minority party
Party	Republican	Democratic
Last election	8	5
Seats won	7	6
Seat change	▼1	▲1
Popular vote	1,819,817	1,140,869
Percentage	61.46%	38.53%
Swing	▲3.91%	▼3.91%

Republican
50–60%
60–70%
70–80%
80–90%
>90%
Democratic
50–60%
60–70%
70–80%
80–90%
>90%

The 2004 House elections in Georgia occurred on November 2, 2004, to elect the members of the state of Georgia's delegation to the United States House of Representatives. Georgia has thirteen seats in the House, apportioned according to the 2000 United States census.

These elections were held concurrently with the United States presidential election of 2004, United States Senate elections of 2004 (including one in Georgia), the United States House elections in other states, and various state and local elections.

This would be the last time Democrats would gain a U.S. house seat in Georgia until the 2018 House elections.

== Overview ==
United States House of Representatives elections in Georgia, 2004
Party	Votes	Percentage	Seats	+/–
Republican	1,819,817	61.46%	7	-1
Democratic	1,140,869	38.53%	6	+1
Totals	1,918,917	100.00%	13	—

== District 1 ==
2004 Georgia's 1st congressional district election
Nominee	Jack Kingston
Party	Republican
Popular vote	188,347
Percentage	100.0%
U.S. Representative before election
Jack Kingston (inc.)
Republican
Elected U.S. Representative
Jack Kingston
Republican

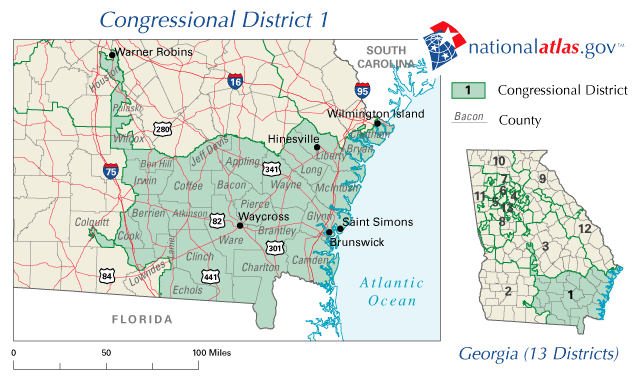

In this conservative, coastal Georgia-based district, incumbent Republican Congressman Jack Kingston ran for re-election to a seventh term in Congress. Kingston was re-elected in the general election without any opposition whatsoever.

=== Predictions ===
Source	Ranking	As of
The Cook Political Report	Safe R	October 29, 2004
Sabato's Crystal Ball	Safe R	November 1, 2004

=== Results ===
Georgia's 1st congressional district election, 2004
Party	Candidate	Votes	%
Republican	Jack Kingston (inc.)	188,347	100.00
Total votes		188,347	100.00
Republican hold			

== District 2 ==
2004 Georgia's 2nd congressional district election
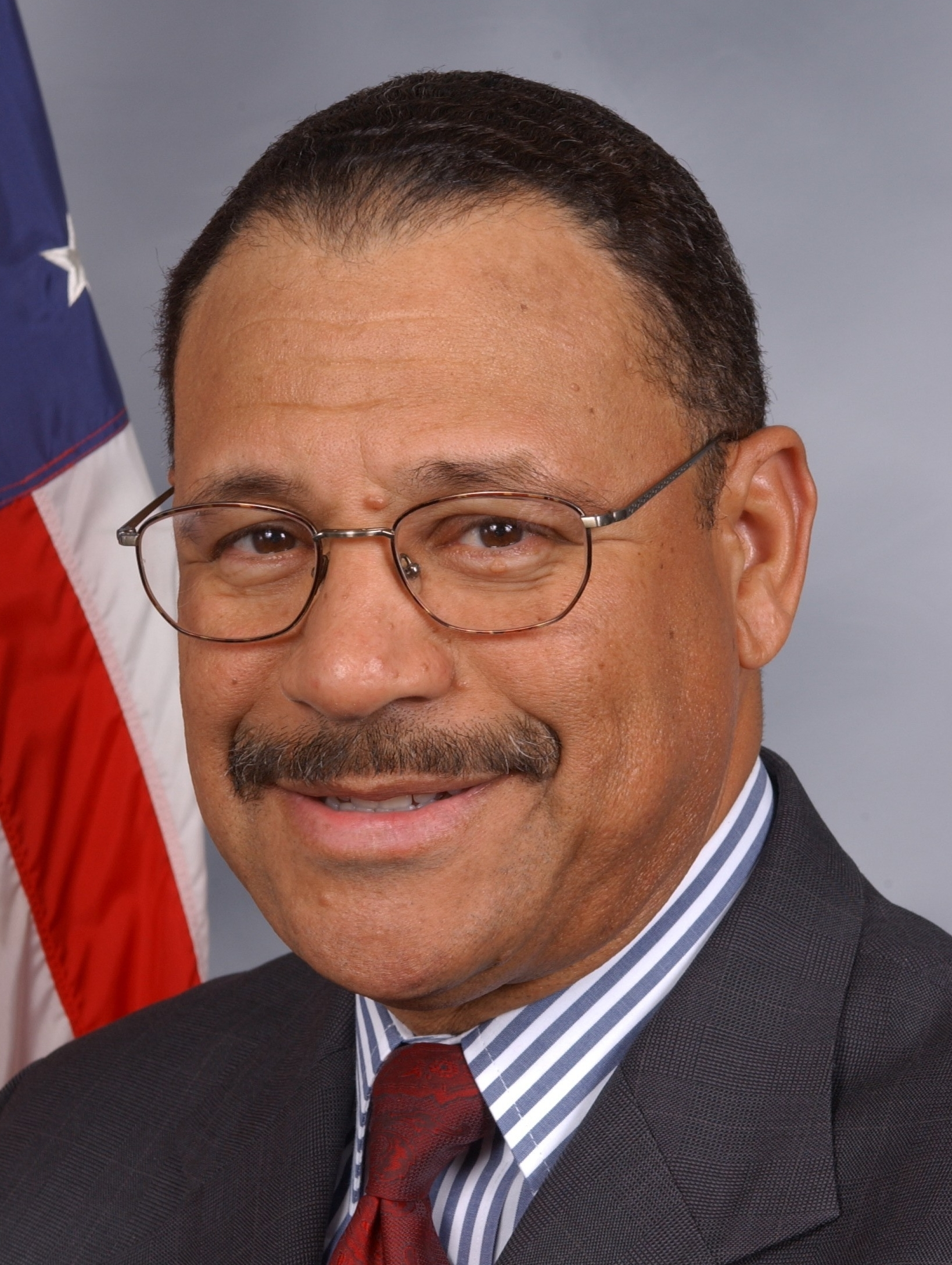

Nominee	Sanford Bishop	Dave Eversman
Party	Democratic	Republican
Popular vote	129,984	64,645
Percentage	66.8%	33.2%
- County results Bishop: 50–60% 60–70% 70–80% Eversman: 50–60%
U.S. Representative before election
Sanford Bishop (inc.)
Democratic
Elected U.S. Representative
Sanford Bishop
Democratic

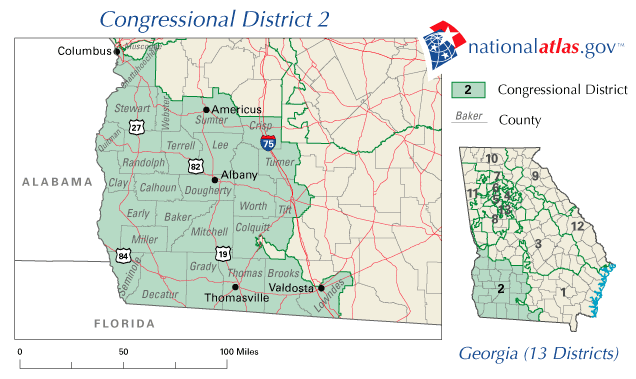

Incumbent Democratic Congressman Sanford Bishop did not face a credible threat to his re-election in this liberal-leaning, southwest Georgia district. Opposed by Republican Dave Eversman, a businessman and local chamber of commerce official, Bishop was overwhelmingly re-elected.

=== Predictions ===
Source	Ranking	As of
The Cook Political Report	Safe D	October 29, 2004
Sabato's Crystal Ball	Safe D	November 1, 2004

=== Results ===
Georgia's 2nd congressional district election, 2004
Party	Candidate	Votes	%
Democratic	Sanford Bishop (inc.)	129,984	66.79
Republican	Dave Eversman	64,645	33.21
Total votes		194,629	100.00
Democratic hold			

== District 3 ==
2004 Georgia's 3rd congressional district election
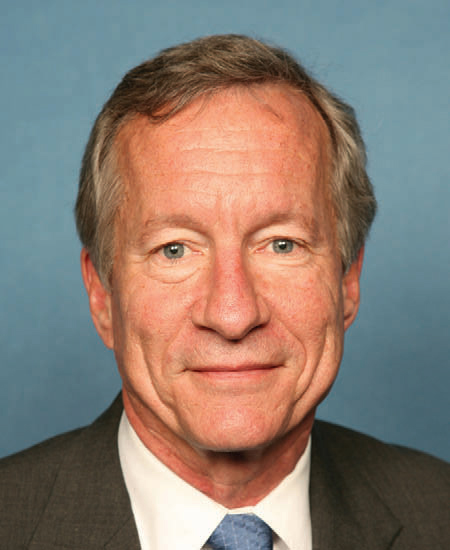

Nominee	Jim Marshall	Calder Clay
Party	Democratic	Republican
Popular vote	136,273	80,435
Percentage	62.9%	37.1%
- County results Marshall: 50–60% 60–70% 70–80% 80–90%
U.S. Representative before election
Jim Marshall
Democratic
Elected U.S. Representative
Jim Marshall
Democratic

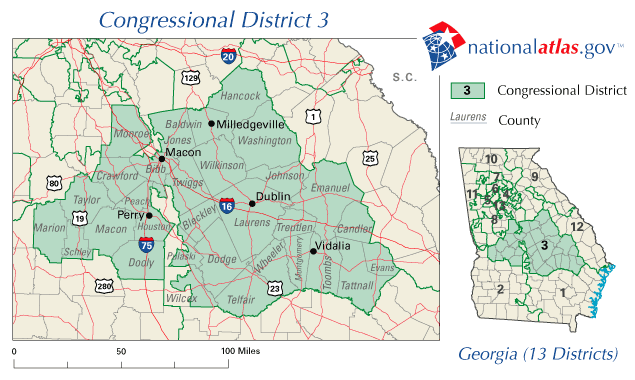

In 2002, Jim Marshall was narrowly elected to Congress in this conservative, central Georgia-based district. This year, Congressman Marshall faced a rematch against businessman Calder Clay, who was the Republican nominee for Congress. In a significant improvement over his previous performance, Marshall crushed Clay with over sixty percent of the vote, surprising given the fact that President George W. Bush carried the district comfortably.

=== Predictions ===
Source	Ranking	As of
The Cook Political Report	Lean D	October 29, 2004
Sabato's Crystal Ball	Lean D	November 1, 2004

=== Results ===
Georgia's 3rd congressional district election, 2004
Party	Candidate	Votes	%
Democratic	Jim Marshall (inc.)	136,273	62.88
Republican	Calder Clay	80,435	37.12
Total votes		216,708	100.00
Democratic hold			

== District 4 ==
2004 Georgia's 4th congressional district election
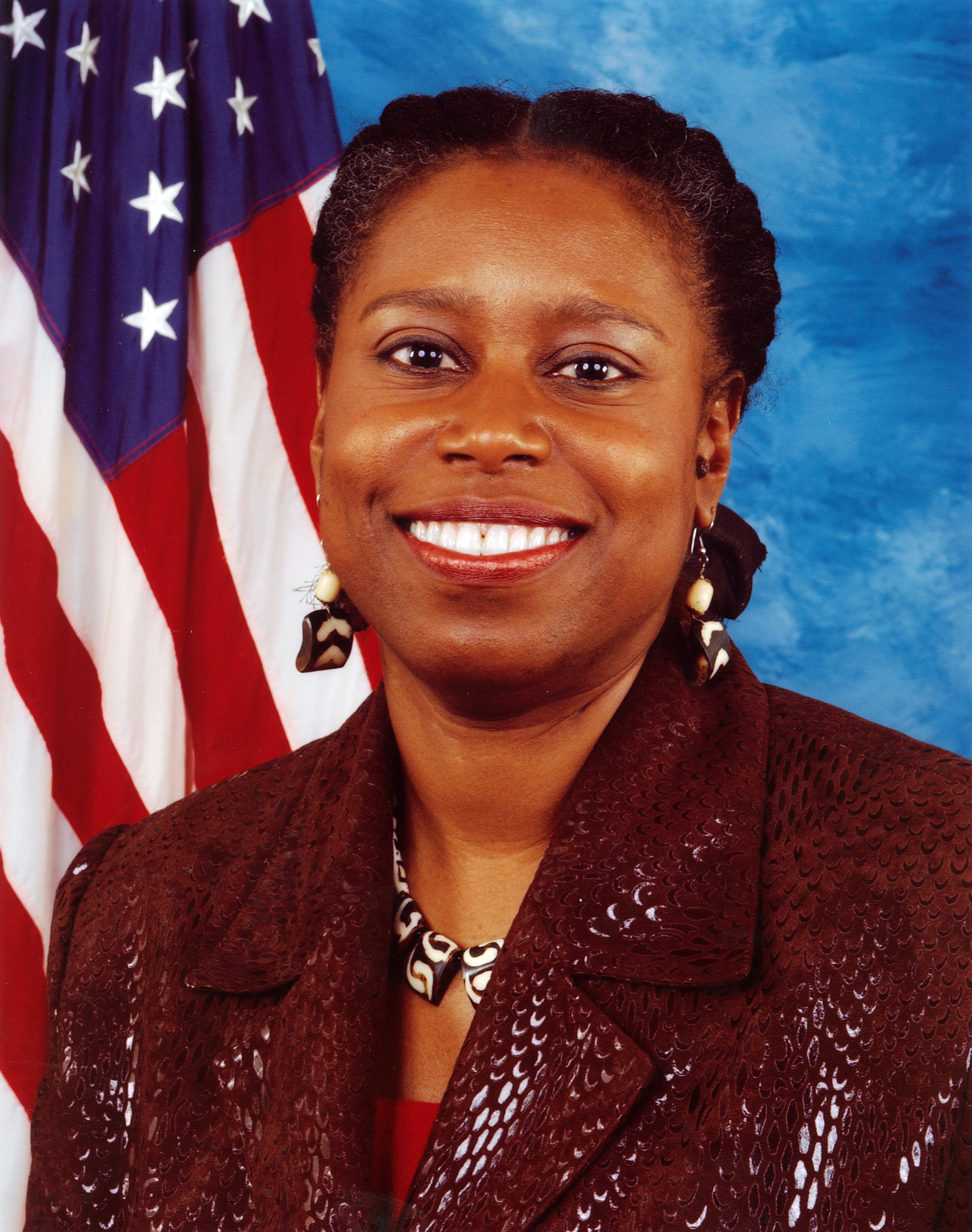

Nominee	Cynthia McKinney	Catherine Davis
Party	Democratic	Republican
Popular vote	157,461	89,509
Percentage	63.8%	36.2%
- County results Mckinney: 60–70% Davis: 60–70%
U.S. Representative before election
Denise Majette
Democratic
Elected U.S. Representative
Cynthia McKinney
Democratic

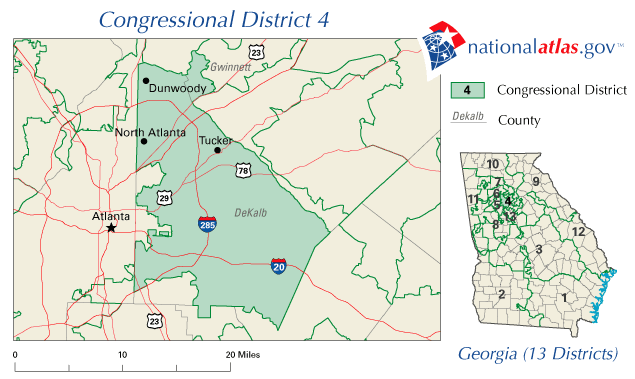

One-term incumbent Democratic Congresswoman Denise Majette opted to run for Senate, creating an open seat in the House. Cynthia McKinney, the previous representative of this district, ran for her sixth nonconsecutive term in Congress. McKinney faced Republican Party official Catherine Davis in the general election, whom she defeated, but by a smaller margin than expected in this solidly liberal district.

=== Predictions ===
Source	Ranking	As of
The Cook Political Report	Safe D	October 29, 2004
Sabato's Crystal Ball	Safe D	November 1, 2004

=== Results ===
Georgia's 4th congressional district election, 2004
Party	Candidate	Votes	%
Democratic	Cynthia McKinney	157,461	63.76
Republican	Catherine Davis	89,509	36.24
Total votes		246,970	100.00
Democratic hold			

== District 5 ==
2004 Georgia's 5th congressional district election
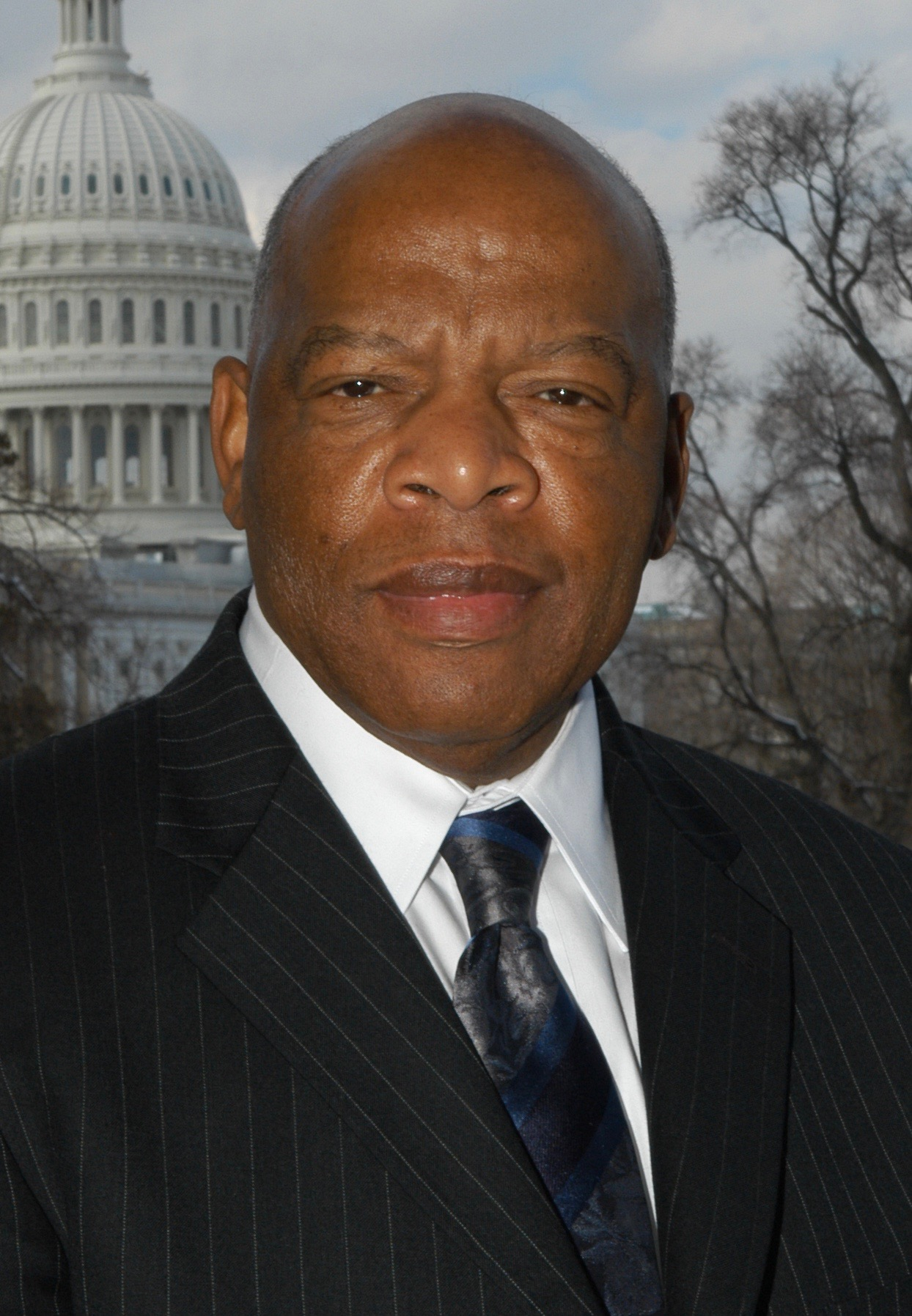
Nominee	John Lewis
Party	Democratic
Popular vote	201,773
Percentage	100.0%
U.S. Representative before election
John Lewis (inc.)
Democratic
Elected U.S. Representative
John Lewis
Democratic

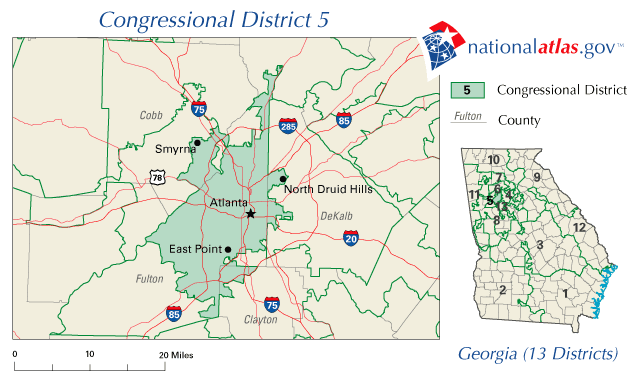

John Lewis, the dean of the Georgia congressional delegation, ran for his tenth term in this solidly liberal, Atlanta-based district. Just as with the previous election, Congressman Lewis was unopposed in the general election and coasted to re-election.

=== Predictions ===
Source	Ranking	As of
The Cook Political Report	Safe D	October 29, 2004
Sabato's Crystal Ball	Safe D	November 1, 2004

=== Results ===
Georgia's 5th congressional district election, 2004
Party	Candidate	Votes	%
Democratic	John Lewis (inc.)	201,773	100.00
Total votes		201,773	100.00
Democratic hold			

== District 6 ==
2004 Georgia's 6th congressional district election
Nominee	Tom Price
Party	Republican
Popular vote	267,542
Percentage	100.0%
U.S. Representative before election
Johnny Isakson
Republican
Elected U.S. Representative
Tom Price
Republican

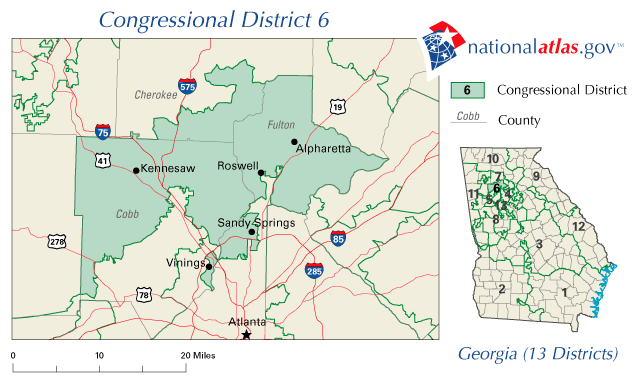

When three-term incumbent Republican Congressman Johnny Isakson sought election to the Senate, an open seat emerged. Physician Tom Price became the Republican nominee after surviving a contentious primary that featured many candidates and a run-off election. Seeing as no Democratic candidate filed to run in this district, Price was sent to his first term in Congress without opposition. However, in this conservative district based in the northern suburbs of Atlanta, the Republican primary is tantamount to election, so Price would not have faced a serious challenge in either case.

=== Predictions ===
Source	Ranking	As of
The Cook Political Report	Safe R	October 29, 2004
Sabato's Crystal Ball	Safe R	November 1, 2004

=== Results ===
Georgia's 6th congressional district election, 2004
Party	Candidate	Votes	%
Republican	Tom Price	267,542	99.97
Write-ins		77	0.03
Total votes		267,619	100.00
Republican hold			

== District 7 ==
2004 Georgia's 7th congressional district election
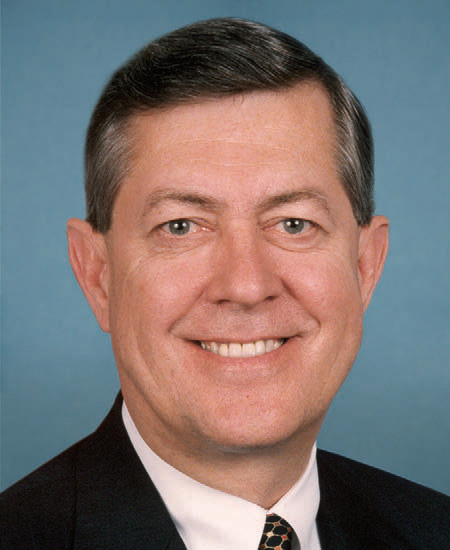
Nominee	John Linder
Party	Republican
Popular vote	258,982
Percentage	100.0%
U.S. Representative before election
John Linder (inc.)
Republican
Elected U.S. Representative
John Linder
Republican

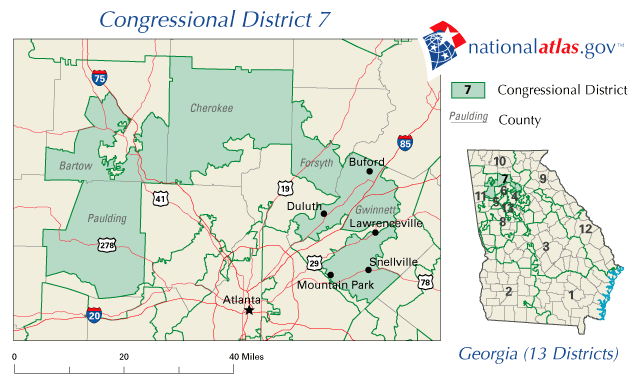

In Republican Congressman John Linder’s bid for a seventh term, he faced no opposition in any form and was successful in his re-election in this staunchly conservative district, which wraps around the northern collar of the suburbs of Atlanta.

=== Predictions ===
Source	Ranking	As of
The Cook Political Report	Safe R	October 29, 2004
Sabato's Crystal Ball	Safe R	November 1, 2004

=== Results ===
Georgia's 7th congressional district election, 2004
Party	Candidate	Votes	%
Republican	John Linder (inc.)	258,982	100.00
Total votes		258,982	100.00
Republican hold			

== District 8 ==
2004 Georgia's 8th congressional district election
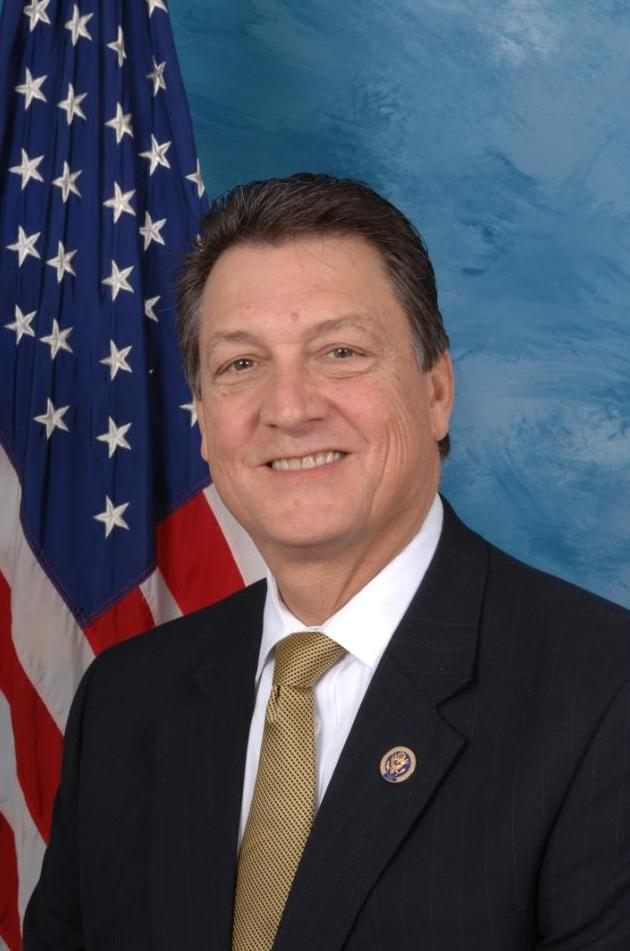

Nominee	Lynn Westmoreland	Silvia Delamar
Party	Republican	Democratic
Popular vote	227,524	73,632
Percentage	75.5%	24.4%
- County results Westmoreland: 60–70% 70–80% 80–90%
U.S. Representative before election
Mac Collins
Republican
Elected U.S. Representative
Lynn Westmoreland
Republican

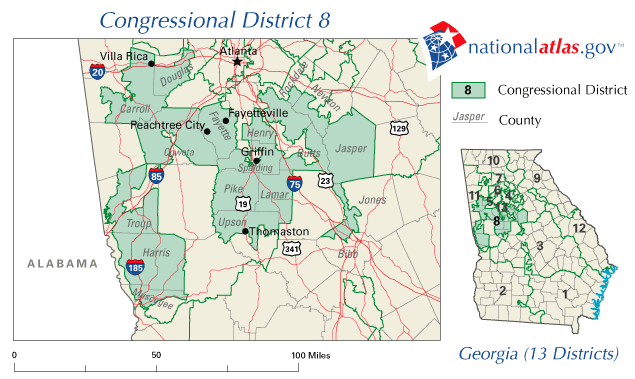

Though Republican Congressman Mac Collins could have easily won a seventh term in this solidly conservative, gerrymandered district based in the southern suburbs of Atlanta and rural north-central Georgia, he instead opted to run for Senate. Lynn Westmoreland, the Republican leader in the Georgia House of Representatives, became the Republican nominee and faced off against Democratic candidate Silvia Delamar. Delamar was defeated by Westmoreland on election day.

=== Predictions ===
Source	Ranking	As of
The Cook Political Report	Safe R	October 29, 2004
Sabato's Crystal Ball	Safe R	November 1, 2004

=== Results ===
Georgia's 8th congressional district election, 2004
Party	Candidate	Votes	%
Republican	Lynn Westmoreland	227,524	75.55
Democratic	Silvia Delamar	73,632	24.45
Total votes		301,156	100.00
Republican hold			

== District 9 ==
2004 Georgia's 9th congressional district election
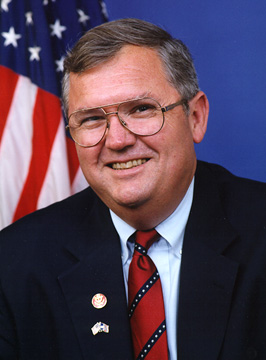

Nominee	Charlie Norwood	Bob Ellis
Party	Republican	Democratic
Popular vote	197,869	68,462
Percentage	74.3%	25.7%
- County results Norwood: 60–70% 70–80%
U.S. Representative before election
Charlie Norwood (inc.)
Republican
Elected U.S. Representative
Charlie Norwood
Republican

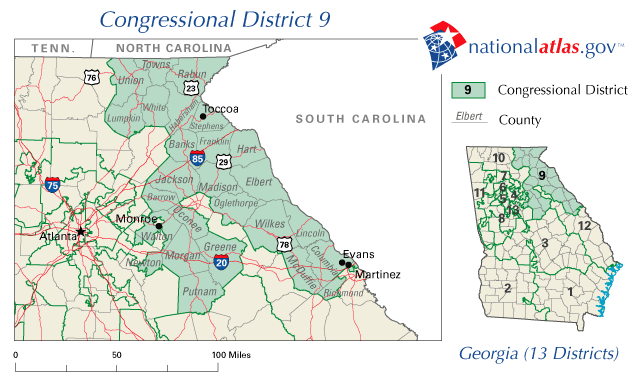

Though popular Republican Congressman Charlie Norwood faced a challenge from Democrat Bob Ellis, he might as well have been unopposed in this solidly conservative district based in north Georgia and some of the suburbs of Atlanta and Augusta. Come election day, Congressman Norwood was overwhelmingly re-elected to his sixth term in Congress.

=== Predictions ===
Source	Ranking	As of
The Cook Political Report	Safe R	October 29, 2004
Sabato's Crystal Ball	Safe R	November 1, 2004

=== Results ===
Georgia's 9th congressional district election, 2004
Party	Candidate	Votes	%
Republican	Charlie Norwood (inc.)	197,869	74.29
Democratic	Bob Ellis	68,462	25.71
Total votes		266,331	100.00
Republican hold			

== District 10 ==
2004 Georgia's 10th congressional district election
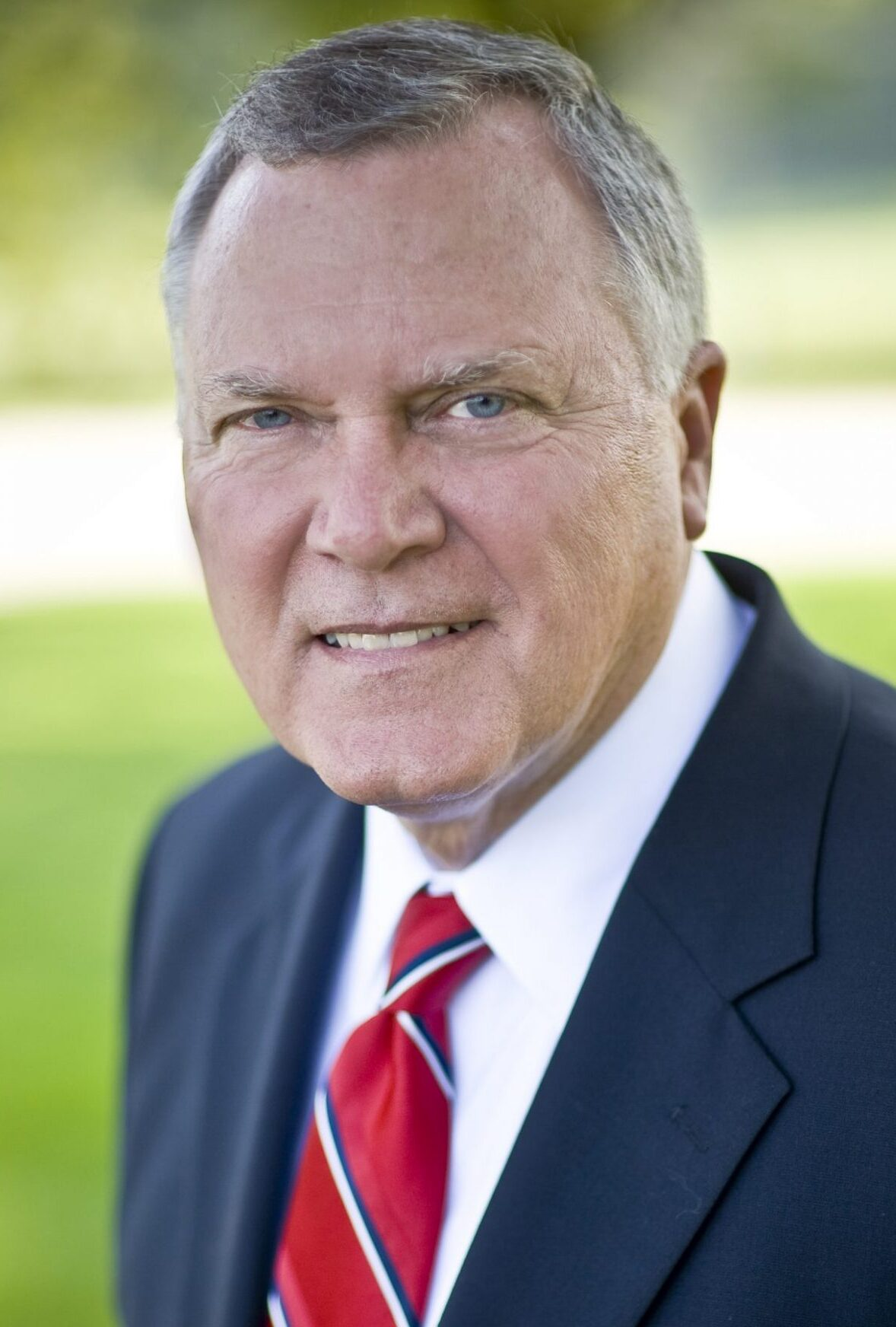
Nominee	Nathan Deal
Party	Republican
Popular vote	219,136
Percentage	100.0%
U.S. Representative before election
Nathan Deal (inc.)
Republican
Elected U.S. Representative
Nathan Deal
Republican

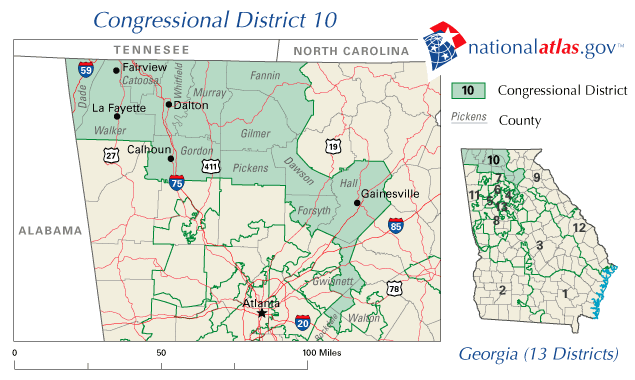

Though he was originally elected as a Democrat, incumbent Congressman Nathan Deal has built a solid profile as a conservative Republican. In this north Georgia district, Deal did not face a Democratic opponent, which meant that he was easily elected to his seventh term.

=== Predictions ===
Source	Ranking	As of
The Cook Political Report	Safe R	October 29, 2004
Sabato's Crystal Ball	Safe R	November 1, 2004

=== Results ===
Georgia's 10th congressional district election, 2004
Party	Candidate	Votes	%
Republican	Nathan Deal (inc.)	219,136	100.00
Total votes		219,136	100.00
Republican hold			

== District 11 ==
2004 Georgia's 11th congressional district election
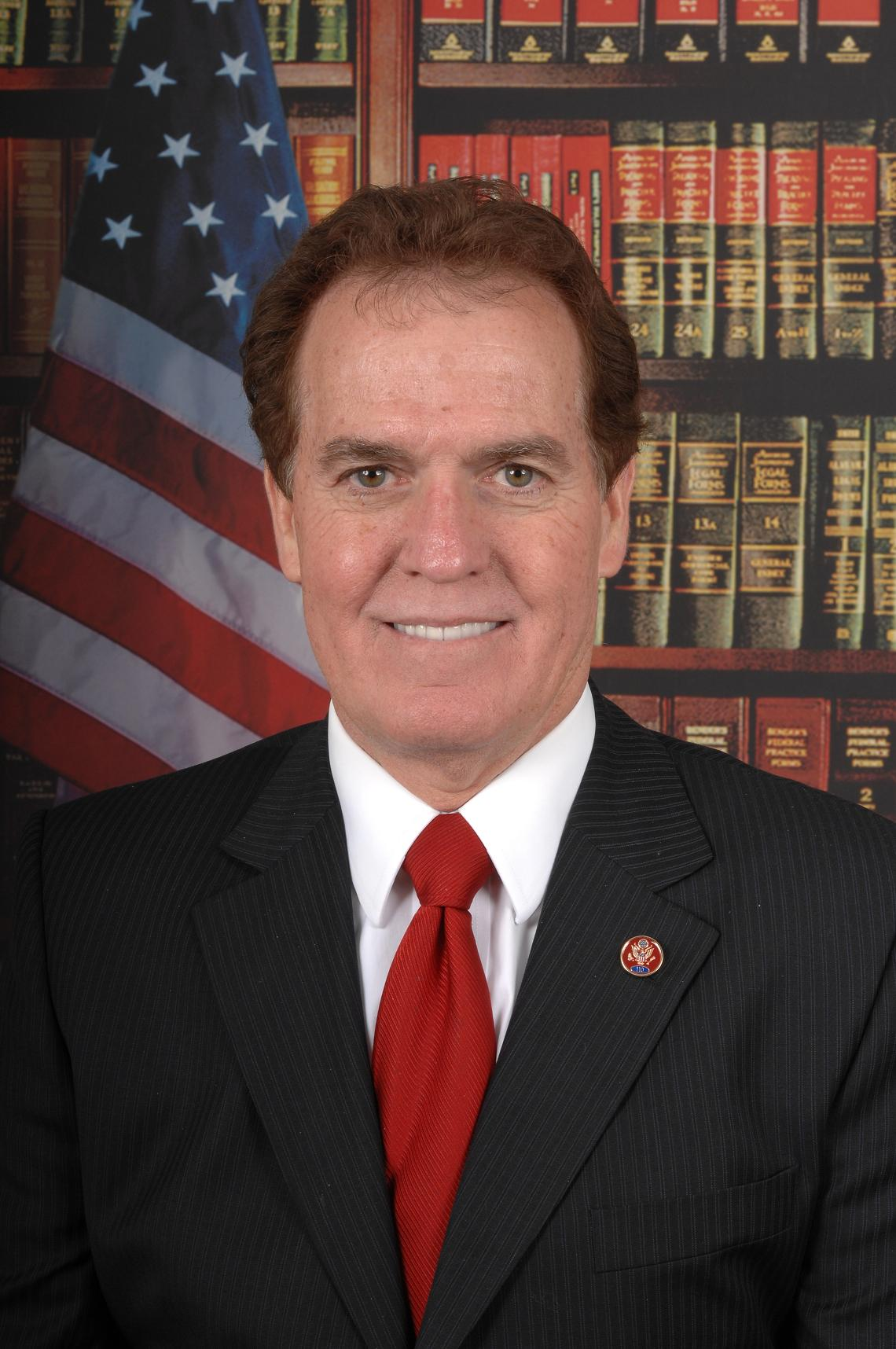

Nominee	Phil Gingrey	Rick Crawford
Party	Republican	Democratic
Popular vote	120,696	89,591
Percentage	57.4%	42.6%
- County results Gingrey: 50–60% 60–70% 70–80% 80–90% Crawford: 50–60%
U.S. Representative before election
Phil Gingrey (inc.)
Republican
Elected U.S. Representative
Phil Gingrey
Republican

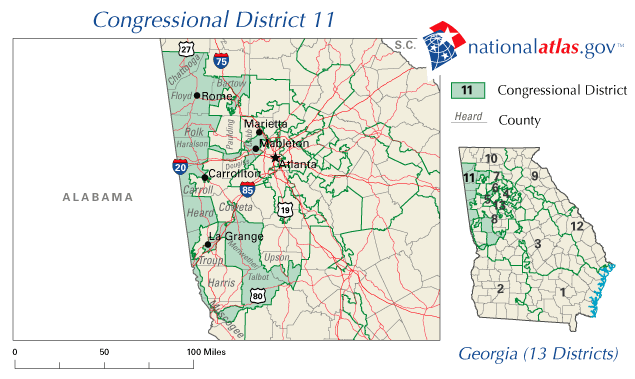

Republican Congressman Phil Gingrey has represented this conservative-leaning district since 2002 and ran for his second term this year. The 11th district, which is somewhat moderate only because it is heavily gerrymandered, has a shape that has been described as similar to that of Indonesia. Congressman Gingrey faced a challenge from Rick Crawford, the chairman of the Polk County Democratic Party and a special Assistant Attorney General of Georgia. Gingrey ultimately beat Crawford by a somewhat comfortable margin, undoubtedly helped by the strong performance of President Bush in Georgia that year.

=== Predictions ===
Source	Ranking	As of
The Cook Political Report	Safe R	October 29, 2004
Sabato's Crystal Ball	Safe R	November 1, 2004

=== Results ===
Georgia's 11th congressional district election, 2004
Party	Candidate	Votes	%
Republican	Phil Gingrey (inc.)	120,696	57.40
Democratic	Rick Crawford	89,591	42.60
Total votes		210,287	100.00
Republican hold			

== District 12 ==
2004 Georgia's 12th congressional district election
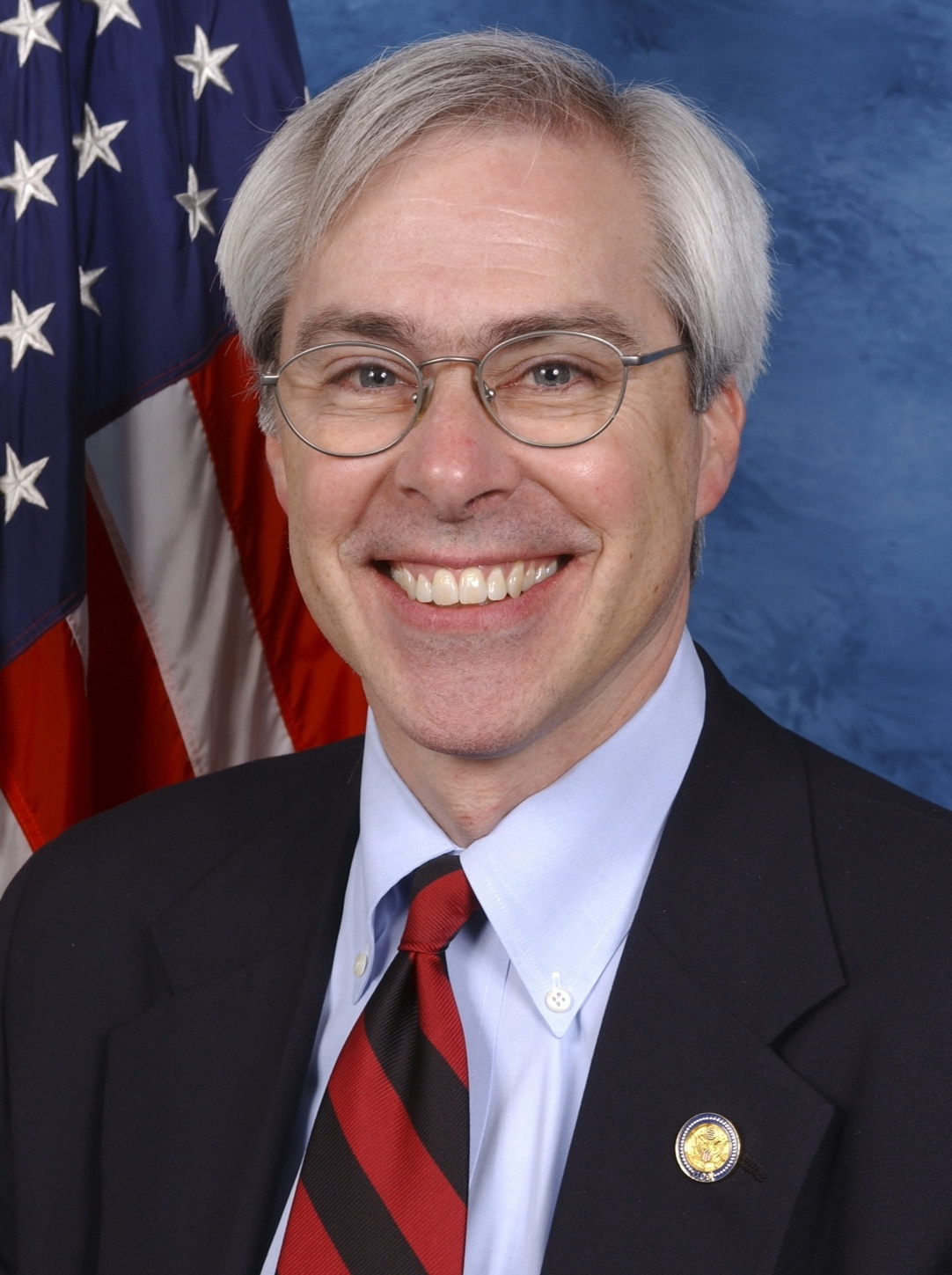

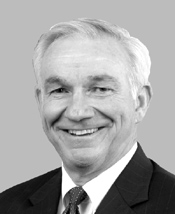
Nominee	John Barrow	Max Burns
Party	Democratic	Republican
Popular vote	113,036	105,132
Percentage	51.8%	48.2%
- County results Barrow: 50–60% 60–70% Burns: 50–60% 60–70% 70–80%
U.S. Representative before election
Max Burns (inc.)
Republican
Elected U.S. Representative
John Barrow
Democratic

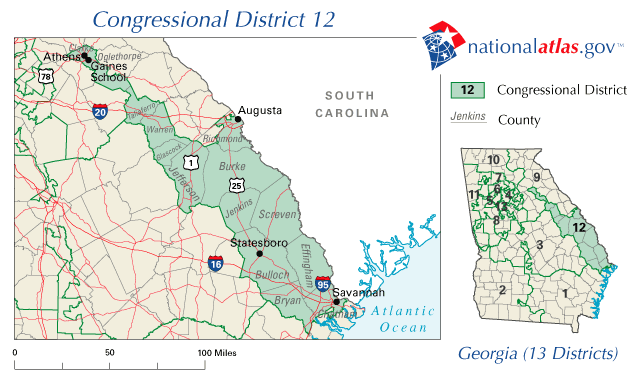

Though one-term Republican Congressman Max Burns has managed to win election in 2002 in this Democratic-leaning district, which stretches from Athens down to the western suburbs of Savannah, his stroke of luck vanished by 2004. Burns faced a scandal- and controversy-free Democratic opponent in Athens-Clarke County Commissioner John Barrow. In a bitterly fought election, Barrow ousted Burns and won his first term in Congress.

=== Predictions ===
Source	Ranking	As of
The Cook Political Report	Tossup	October 29, 2004
Sabato's Crystal Ball	Tilt D (flip)	November 1, 2004

=== Results ===
Georgia's 12th congressional district election, 2004
Party	Candidate	Votes	%
Democratic	John Barrow	113,036	51.81
Republican	Max Burns (inc.)	105,132	48.19
Total votes		218,168	100.00
Democratic gain from Republican			

== District 13 ==
2004 Georgia's 13th congressional district election
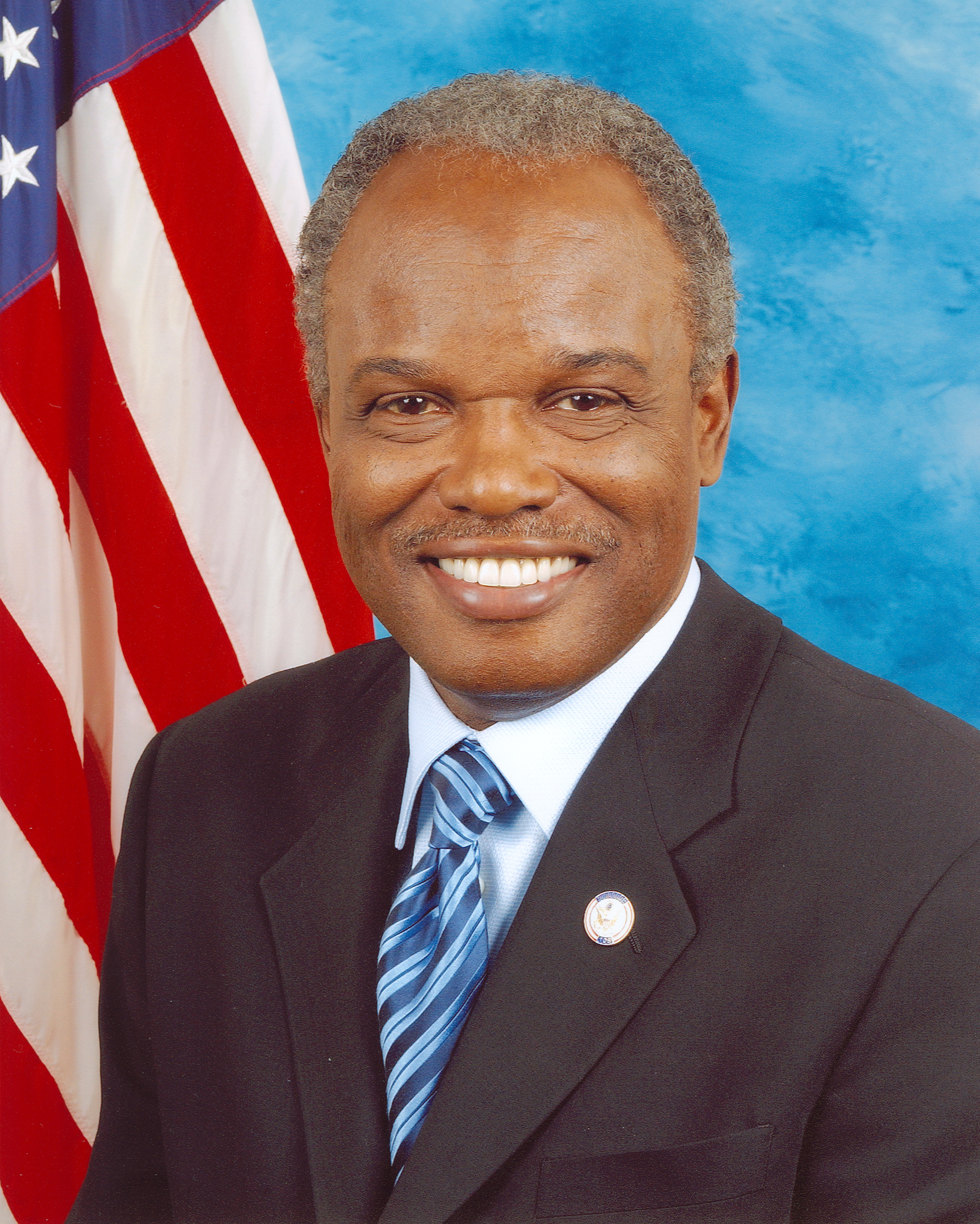
Nominee	David Scott
Party	Democratic
Popular vote	170,657
Percentage	100.0%
U.S. Representative before election
David Scott (inc.)
Democratic
Elected U.S. Representative
David Scott
Democratic

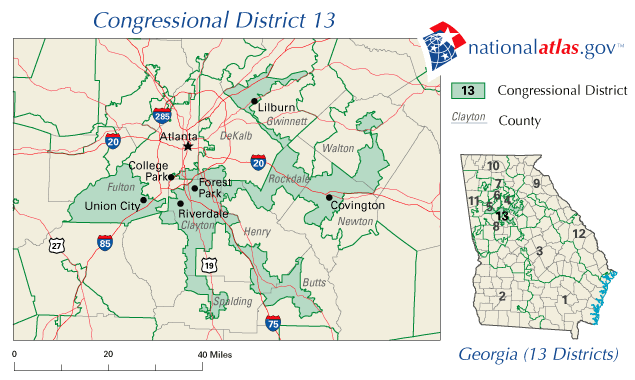

Originally elected in 2002 in a gerrymandered district drawn to elect a Democrat, incumbent Congressman David Scott sought election to a second term in Congress. Congressman Scott did not face any sort of challenge in his re-election bid, so he was sent back to Washington unopposed.

=== Predictions ===
Source	Ranking	As of
The Cook Political Report	Safe D	October 29, 2004
Sabato's Crystal Ball	Safe D	November 1, 2004

=== Results ===
Georgia's 13th congressional district election, 2004
Party	Candidate	Votes	%
Democratic	David Scott (inc.)	170,657	100.00
Total votes		170,657	100.00
Democratic hold			
