= 2002 United States House of Representatives elections in Georgia =

- November 5, 2002

All 13 Georgia seats to the United States House of Representatives
	Majority party	Minority party
Party	Republican	Democratic
Last election	8	3
Seats won	8	5
Seat change	Steady	▲2
Popular vote	1,104,622	814,295
Percentage	57.56%	42.44%
Swing	▼4.44%	▲4.44%

Republican
50–60%
60–70%
70–80%
80–90%
>90%
Democratic
50–60%
60–70%
70–80%
>90%

The 2002 House elections in Georgia occurred on November 5, 2002, to elect the members of the State of Georgia's delegation to the United States House of Representatives. Georgia has thirteen seats in the House, apportioned according to the 2000 United States census. These elections were held concurrently with the United States Senate elections of 2002 (including one in Georgia), the United States House elections in other states, and various state and local elections.

Georgia gained two House seats after the 2000 census, but the Democratic-controlled Georgia General Assembly wanted to see more Democrats in the congressional delegation. They gerrymandered a map that was designed to elect seven Democrats and six Republicans; the delegation at the time consisted of eight Republicans and three Democrats. Notable differences between the new Congressional districts that were drawn as compared with the previous ones that previously existed were: the Third district, the predecessor of modern Eighth district, was reconfigured to be more neutral than its previous incarnation; the districts of Incumbent Representatives John Linder (R) and Bob Barr (R) were combined into one district (this being the modern Seventh district); and the creation of the Twelfth and Thirteenth districts (each of which were designed to favor Democrats).

== Overview ==
United States House of Representatives elections in Georgia, 2002
Party	Votes	Percentage	Seats	+/–
Republican	1,104,622	57.56%	8	—
Democratic	814,295	42.44%	5	+2
Totals	1,918,917	100.00%	13	+2

== District 1 ==
2002 Georgia's 1st congressional district election
- November 5, 2002

Nominee	Jack Kingston	Don Smart
Party	Republican	Democratic
Popular vote	103,661	40,026
Percentage	72.14%	27.86%
- Precinct results Kingston: 50–60% 60–70% 70–80% 80–90% >90% Smart: 50–60% 60–70% 70–80% 80–90% >90%
U.S. Representative before election
Jack Kingston
Republican
Elected U.S. Representative
Jack Kingston
Republican

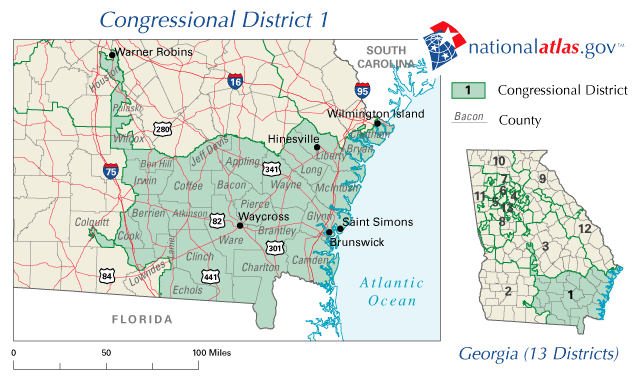

Following redistricting as a result of the 2000 census, this district, based in southeastern Georgia, maintained its strongly conservative bent, pulling from the conservative suburbs of Savannah, the social conservatives along the coastline, and stretching into the highly conservative Warner Robins, where an air force base is located. Incumbent Republican Congressman Jack Kingston ran for a sixth term in Congress, and he won it by crushing Democratic nominee Don Smart in a landslide.

=== Predictions ===
Source	Ranking	As of
Sabato's Crystal Ball	Safe R	November 4, 2002
New York Times	Safe R	October 14, 2002

=== Results ===
Georgia's 1st congressional district election, 2002
Party	Candidate	Votes	%
Republican	Jack Kingston (inc.)	103,661	72.14
Democratic	Don Smart	40,026	27.86
Total votes		143,687	100.00
Republican hold			

== District 2 ==
2002 Georgia's 2nd congressional district election
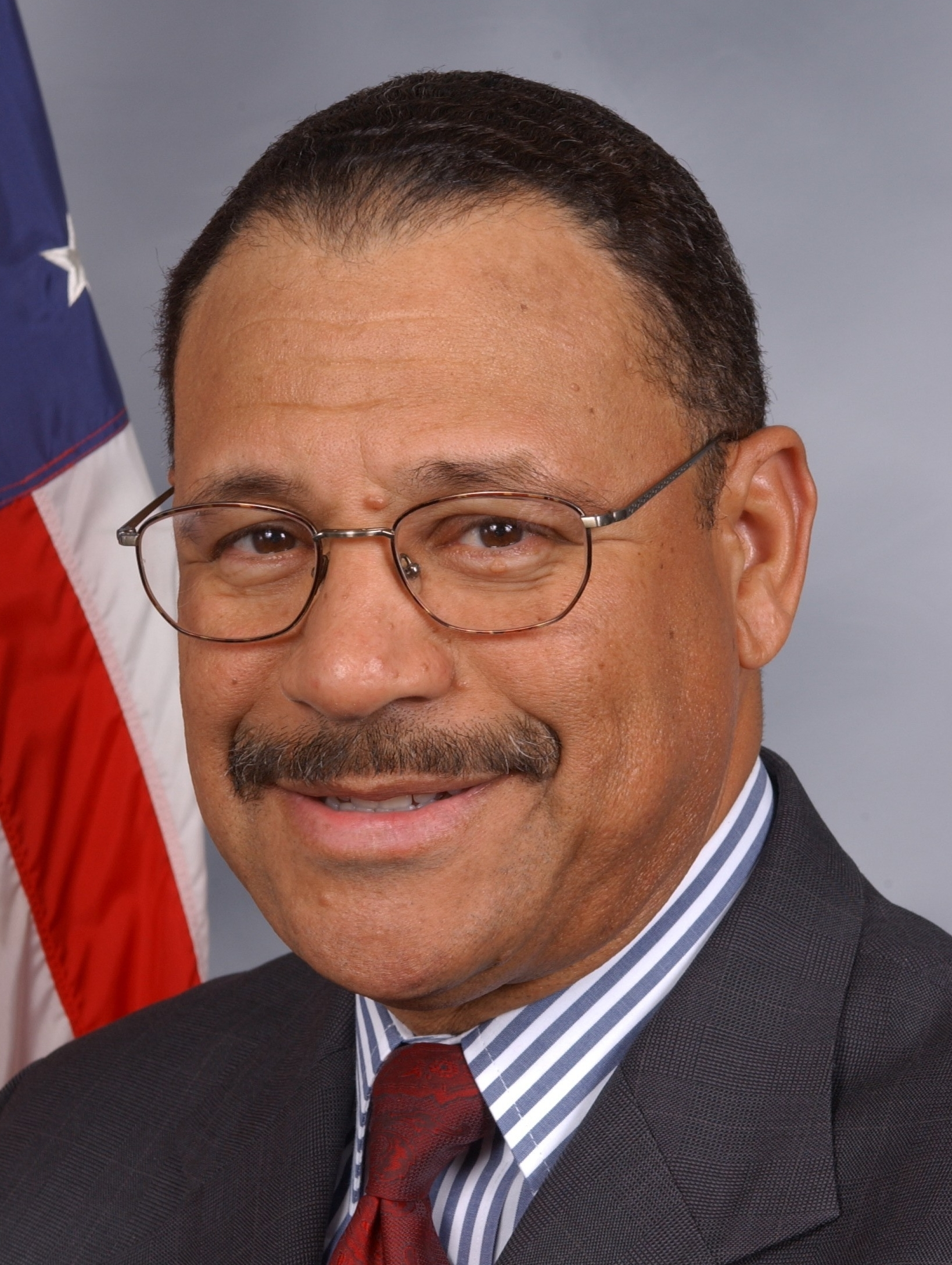
Nominee	Sanford Bishop
Party	Democratic
Popular vote	102,925
Percentage	100.0%
U.S. Representative before election
Sanford Bishop (inc.)
Democratic
Elected U.S. Representative
Sanford Bishop
Democratic

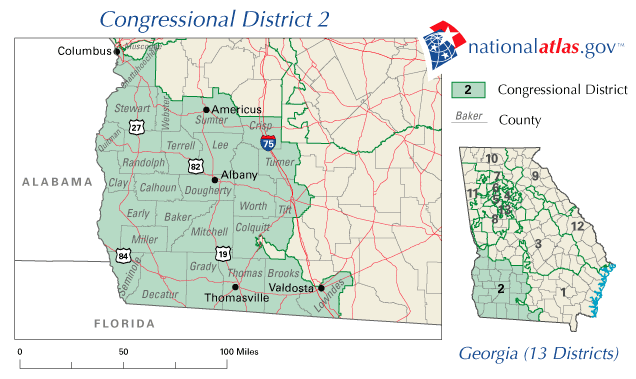

Incumbent Democratic Congressman Sanford Bishop has represented this relatively liberal, southwestern Georgia district since his initial election in 1992. Pulling from Valdosta, Albany, Americus and some of Columbus, this district has a considerable African-American population, which contributed to the district's liberal bent and to Congressman Bishop's continual elections. Bishop won his sixth term in Congress without any opposition.

=== Predictions ===
Source	Ranking	As of
Sabato's Crystal Ball	Safe D	November 4, 2002
New York Times	Safe D	October 14, 2002

=== Results ===
Georgia's 2nd congressional district election, 2002
Party	Candidate	Votes	%
Democratic	Sanford Bishop (inc.)	102,925	100.00
Total votes		102,925	100.00
Democratic hold			

== District 3 ==
2002 Georgia's 3rd congressional district election
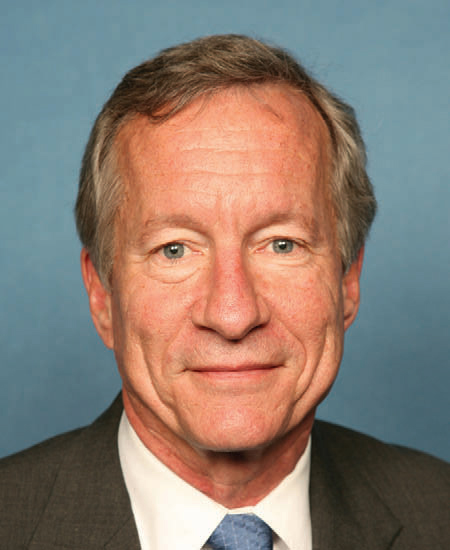

Nominee	Jim Marshall	Calder Clay
Party	Democratic	Republican
Popular vote	75,394	73,866
Percentage	50.5%	49.5%
- Marshall: 50–60% 60–70% 70–80% 80–90% >90% Clay: 50–60% 60–70% 70–80% 80–90%
U.S. Representative before election
Saxby Chambliss
Republican
Elected U.S. Representative
Jim Marshall
Democratic

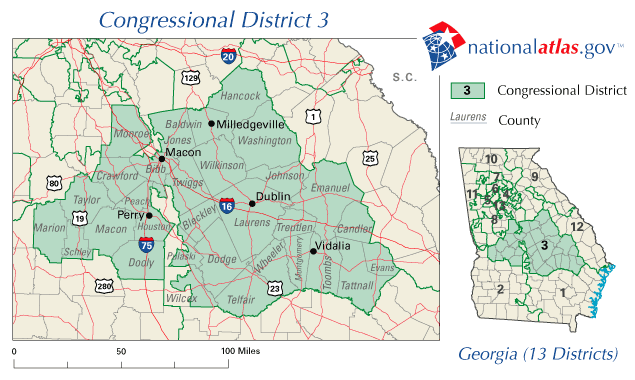

When incumbent Republican Congressman Saxby Chambliss declined to seek another term in Congress to instead pursue a successful campaign for the Senate, an open seat was created. Democrat Jim Marshall, Chambliss's 2000 opponent and a former Mayor of Macon, emerged as the Democratic nominee and narrowly edged out Republican businessman Calder Clay to win his first term.

=== Predictions ===
Source	Ranking	As of
Sabato's Crystal Ball	Lean D (flip)	November 4, 2002
New York Times	Lean D (flip)	October 14, 2002

=== Results ===
Georgia's 3rd congressional district election, 2002
Party	Candidate	Votes	%
Democratic	Jim Marshall	75,394	50.51
Republican	Calder Clay	73,866	49.49
Total votes		149,260	100.00
Democratic gain from Republican			

== District 4 ==
2002 Georgia's 4th congressional district election
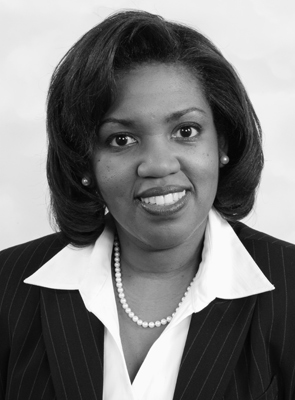

Nominee	Denise Majette	Cynthia Van Auken
Party	Democratic	Republican
Popular vote	118,045	35,202
Percentage	77.03%	22.97%
- County results Majette: 50–60% 70–80%

- Precinct results Majette: 50–60% 60–70% 70–80% 80–90% >90% Van Auken: 50–60% 60–70%
U.S. Representative before election
Cynthia McKinney
Democratic
Elected U.S. Representative
Denise Majette
Democratic

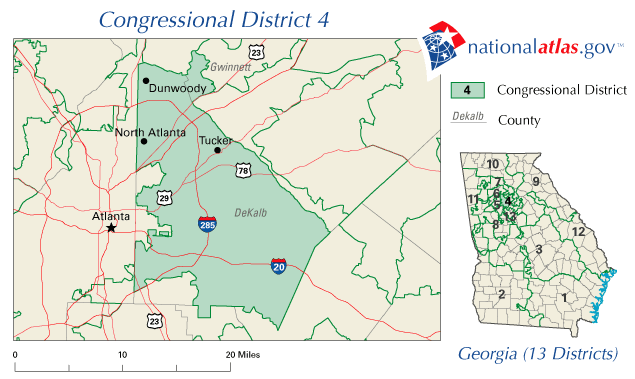

While incumbent Democratic Congresswoman Cynthia McKinney opted to run for a sixth term in Congress, she was defeated in the Democratic primary by DeKalb County State Court Judge Denise Majette. In this solidly liberal district based in Atlanta and the African-American-heavy suburbs in DeKalb County, the Democratic primary was tantamount to election. True to the district's leanings, Majette bested Republican nominee Cynthia Van Auken in the general election.

=== Predictions ===
Source	Ranking	As of
Sabato's Crystal Ball	Safe D	November 4, 2002
New York Times	Safe D	October 14, 2002

=== Results ===
Democratic Primary
Party	Candidate	Votes	%
Democratic	Denise Majette	68,612	58.3
Democratic	Cynthia McKinney (incumbent)	49,058	41.7
Total votes		117,670	100.00

Georgia's 4th congressional district election, 2002
Party	Candidate	Votes	%
Democratic	Denise Majette	118,045	77.03
Republican	Cynthia Van Auken	35,202	22.97
Total votes		153,247	100.00
Democratic hold			

== District 5 ==
2002 Georgia's 5th congressional district election
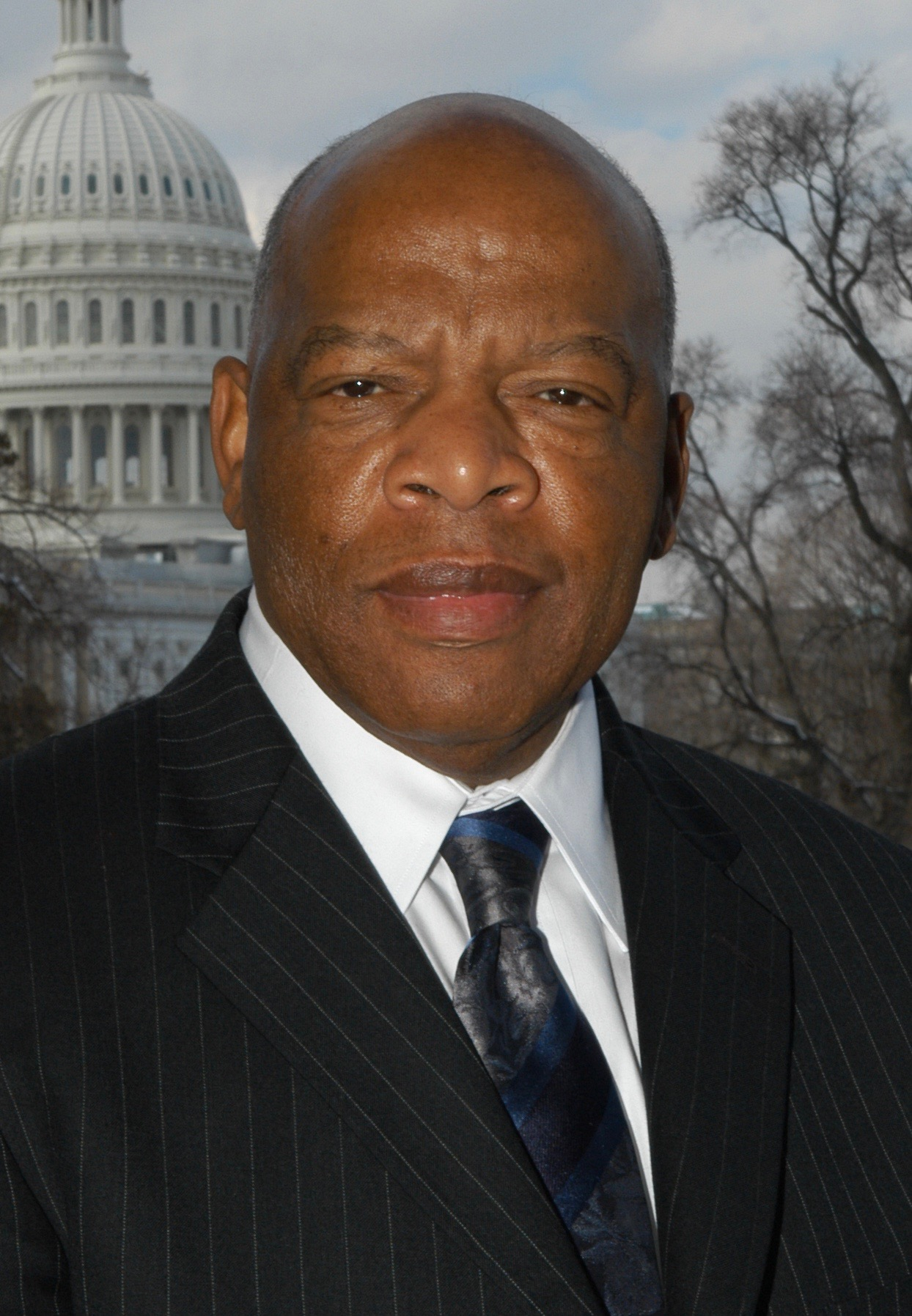
Nominee	John Lewis
Party	Democratic
Popular vote	116,259
Percentage	100.0%
U.S. Representative before election
John Lewis (inc.)
Democratic
Elected U.S. Representative
John Lewis
Democratic

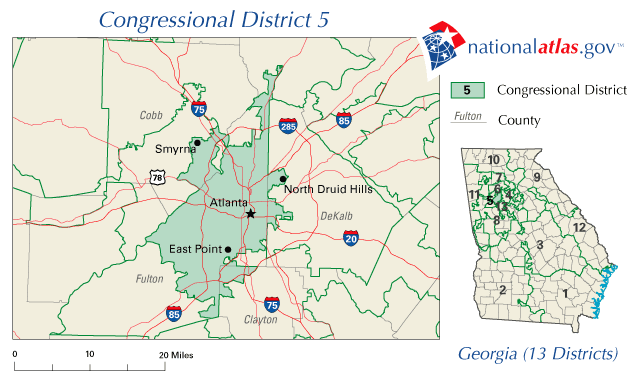

Civil Rights Movement leader John Lewis had represented this firmly liberal district since 1987. Congressman Lewis had not encountered serious challenge in his career, seeing as the 5th district is rooted in the city of Atlanta. This year proved to be no different, and Lewis won a ninth term in Congress with no opposition.

=== Predictions ===
Source	Ranking	As of
Sabato's Crystal Ball	Safe D	November 4, 2002
New York Times	Safe D	October 14, 2002

=== Results ===
Georgia's 5th congressional district election, 2002
Party	Candidate	Votes	%
Democratic	John Lewis (inc.)	116,259	100.00
Total votes		116,259	100.00
Democratic hold			

== District 6 ==
2002 Georgia's 6th congressional district election

Nominee	Johnny Isakson	Jeff Weisberger
Party	Republican	Democratic
Popular vote	163,525	41,204
Percentage	79.87%	20.13%
- Precinct results Isakson: 50–60% 60–70% 70–80% 80–90% >90% Weisberger: 50–60% 60–70% No votes
U.S. Representative before election
Johnny Isakson
Republican
Elected U.S. Representative
Johnny Isakson
Republican

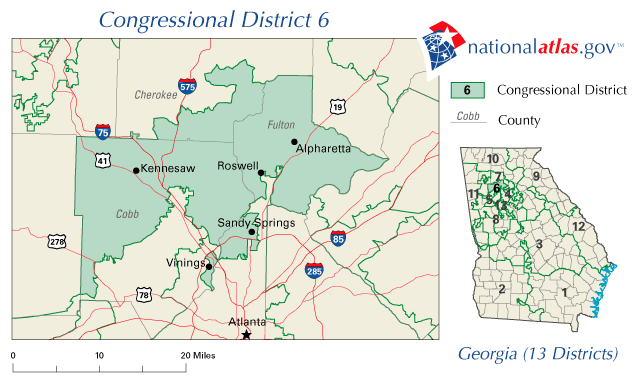

Incumbent Republican Congressman Johnny Isakson, elected in a 1999 special election to replace the former Speaker of the House Newt Gingrich, sought his third term in this highly conservative district based in the northern suburbs of Atlanta. Congressman Isakson defeated Democratic nominee Jeff Weisberger in the general election.

=== Predictions ===
Source	Ranking	As of
Sabato's Crystal Ball	Safe R	November 4, 2002
New York Times	Safe R	October 14, 2002

=== Results ===
Georgia's 6th congressional district election, 2002
Party	Candidate	Votes	%
Republican	Johnny Isakson (inc.)	163,525	79.87
Democratic	Jeff Weisberger	41,204	20.13
Total votes		204,729	100.00
Republican hold			

== District 7 ==
2002 Georgia's 7th congressional district election
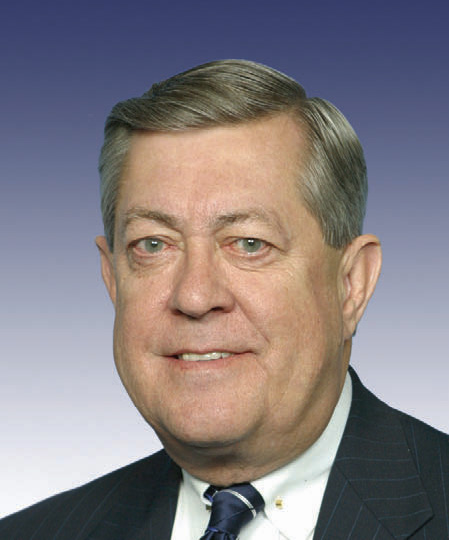

Nominee	John Linder	Micheal Berlon
Party	Republican	Democratic
Popular vote	138,997	37,124
Percentage	78.92%	21.08%
- Precinct results Linder: 50–60% 60–70% 70–80% 80–90% >90%
U.S. Representative before election
Bob Barr
Republican
Elected U.S. Representative
John Linder
Republican

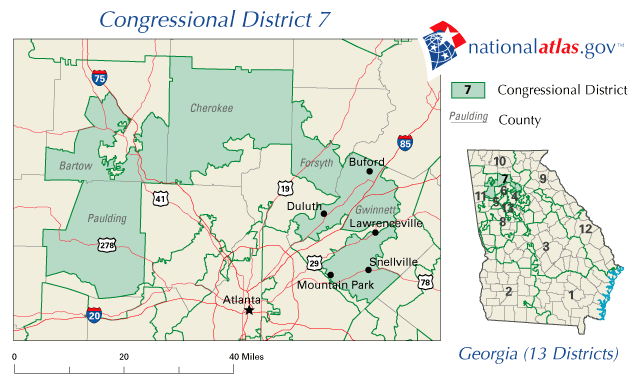

Incumbent Republican Congressman John Linder and Bob Barr were redistricted into the same district, a heavily gerrymandered conservative district based in the northern suburbs of Atlanta. The district was numerically Barr's (the 7th), but was geographically more Linder's district. Linder easily defeated Barr in the Republican primary. Linder has been an outspoken conservative during his time in Congress and was well known for being the main congressional sponsor of the FairTax. In 2002, Congressman Linder faced Democratic candidate Mike Berlon in the general election and defeated him in a landslide.

=== Predictions ===
Source	Ranking	As of
Sabato's Crystal Ball	Safe R	November 4, 2002
New York Times	Safe R	October 14, 2002

=== Results ===
Republican primary
Party	Candidate	Votes	%
Republican	John Linder (incumbent)	56,892	64.5
Republican	Bob Barr (incumbent)	31,374	35.5
Total votes		88 266	100.00

Georgia's 7th congressional district election, 2002
Party	Candidate	Votes	%
Republican	John Linder (incumbent)	138,997	78.92
Democratic	Michael Berlon	37,124	21.08
Total votes		176,121	100.00
Republican hold			

== District 8 ==
2002 Georgia's 8th congressional district election
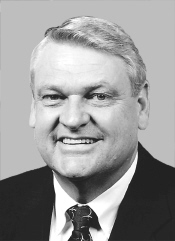

Nominee	Mac Collins	Angelos Petrakopoulos
Party	Republican	Democratic
Popular vote	142,505	39,422
Percentage	78.43%	21.67%
- Precinct results Collins: 50–60% 60–70% 70–80% 80–90% >90% Pertrakopoulos: 60–70%
U.S. Representative before election
Mac Collins
Republican
Elected U.S. Representative
Mac Collins
Republican

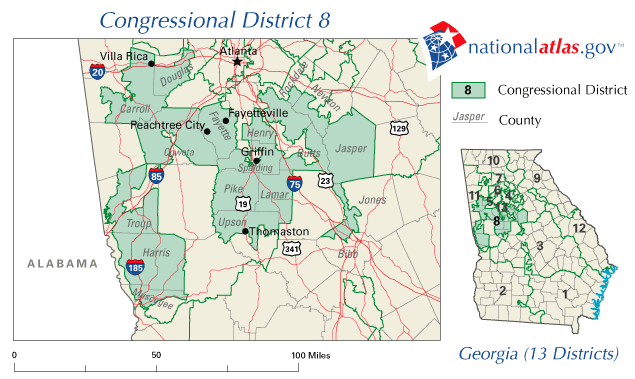

Five-term incumbent Republican Congressman Mac Collins ran for a sixth term in this gerrymandered, conservative district based in some of the southern and western suburbs of Atlanta and the rural communities of north-central Georgia. Congressman Collins faced computer consultant and Democratic nominee Angelos Petrakopoulos in the general election, which he won handily.

=== Predictions ===
Source	Ranking	As of
Sabato's Crystal Ball	Safe R	November 4, 2002
New York Times	Safe R	October 14, 2002

=== Results ===
Georgia's 8th congressional district election, 2002
Party	Candidate	Votes	%
Republican	Mac Collins (inc.)	142,505	78.33
Democratic	Angelos Petrakopoulos	39,422	21.67
Total votes		181,927	100.00
Republican hold			

== District 9 ==
2002 Georgia's 9th congressional district election
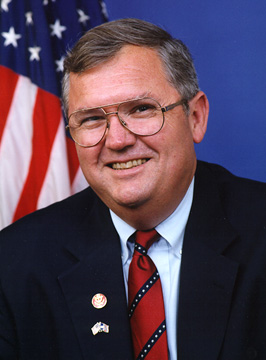

Nominee	Charlie Norwood	Barry Irwin
Party	Republican	Democratic
Popular vote	123,313	45,974
Percentage	72.84%	27.16%
- Precinct results Norwood: 50–60% 60–70% 70–80% 80–90% Irwin: 50–60% 60–70% 70–80%
U.S. Representative before election
Charlie Norwood
Republican
Elected U.S. Representative
Charlie Norwood
Republican

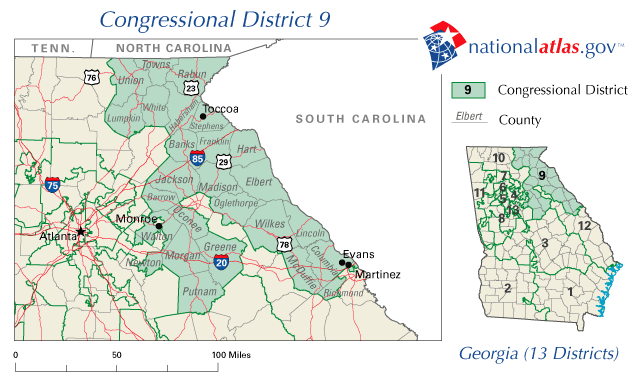

In this heavily conservative district based in northeastern Georgia, the eastern exurbs of Atlanta and the northern suburbs Augusta, incumbent Republican Congressman Charlie Norwood sought a fifth term. Norwood was the heavy favorite in this district, one of the most conservative in the country, and easily trumped Democratic opponent Barry Irwin in the general election.

=== Predictions ===
Source	Ranking	As of
Sabato's Crystal Ball	Safe R	November 4, 2002
New York Times	Safe R	October 14, 2002

=== Results ===
Georgia's 9th congressional district election, 2002
Party	Candidate	Votes	%
Republican	Charlie Norwood (inc.)	123,313	72.84
Democratic	Barry Irwin	45,974	27.16
Total votes		169,287	100.00
Republican hold			

== District 10 ==
2002 Georgia's 10th congressional district election
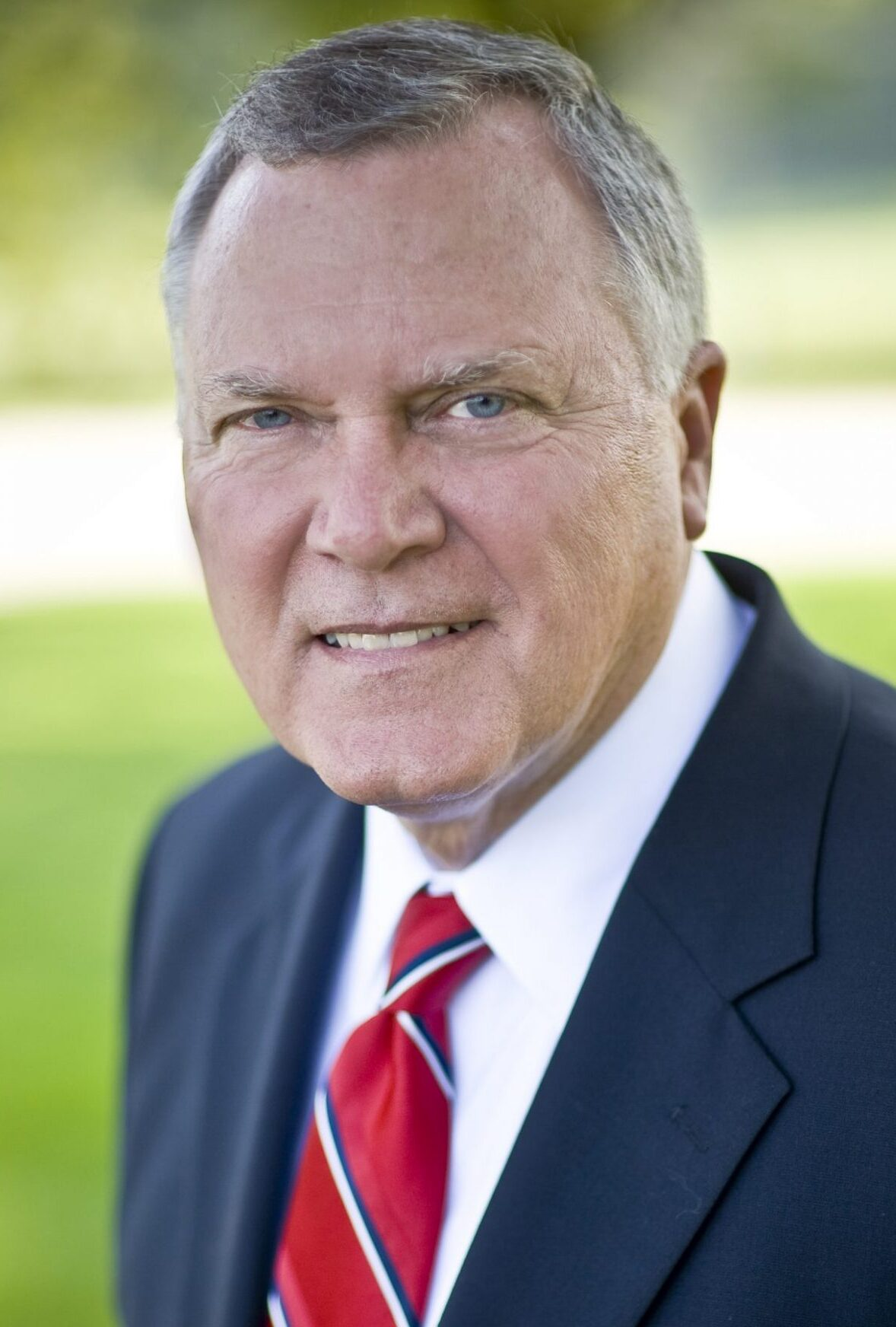
Nominee	Nathan Deal
Party	Republican
Popular vote	128,685
Percentage	100.0%
U.S. Representative before election
Nathan Deal (inc.)
Republican
Elected U.S. Representative
Nathan Deal
Republican

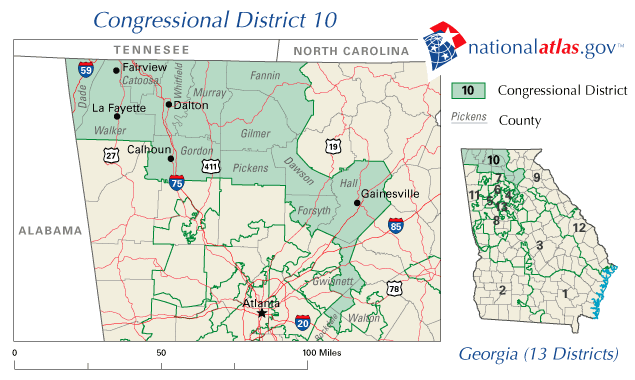

Incumbent Republican Congressman Nathan Deal was initially elected to Congress in 1992 as a Democrat, but switched to his current affiliation as a Republican in 1995 and has been re-elected without substantive opposition ever since. Deal represents a heavily conservative district that includes much of northwestern Georgia, the northern and eastern suburbs of Atlanta and the city of Gainesville. Congressman Deal was unopposed in the general election and thus won his sixth term without competition.

=== Predictions ===
Source	Ranking	As of
Sabato's Crystal Ball	Safe R	November 4, 2002
New York Times	Safe R	October 14, 2002

=== Results ===
Georgia's 10th congressional district election, 2002
Party	Candidate	Votes	%
Republican	Nathan Deal (inc.)	128,685	100.00
Total votes		167,925	100.00
Republican hold			

== District 11 ==
2002 Georgia's 11th congressional district election
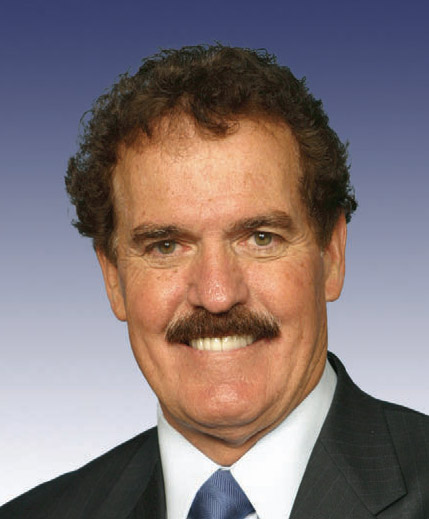

Nominee	Phil Gingrey	Roger Kahn
Party	Republican	Democratic
Popular vote	69,261	64,923
Percentage	51.62%	48.38%
- Precinct results Gingrey: 50–60% 60–70% 70–80% 80–90% Kahn: 50–60% 60–70% 70–80% 80–90% >90% No votes
U.S. Representative before election
John Linder
Republican
Elected U.S. Representative
Phil Gingrey
Republican

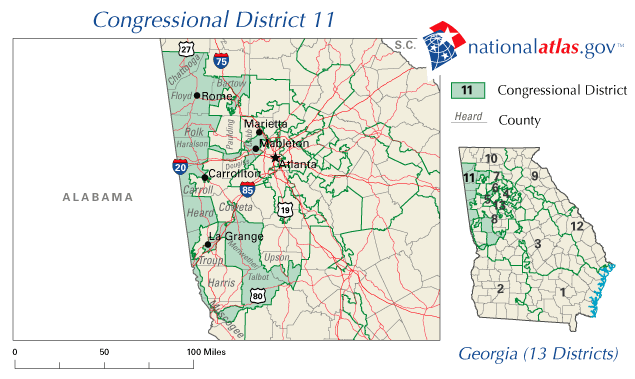

This gerrymandered district that runs along much of Georgia's northern border with Alabama and includes liberal-leaning rural territory north of Atlanta overlaps with much of the former 7th district, represented by four term Republican incumbent Bob Barr. Barr opted to run for re-election in the new 7th district which contained a significant portion of his old base. Republican State Senator Phil Gingrey emerged victorious in the Republican Primary for this open seat election. Gingrey faced Democratic candidate Roger Kahn, a businessman, Barr's 2000 opponent, and a member of the Georgia State Elections Board. In a close election, Gingrey defeated Kahn and won his first term in Congress.

=== Predictions ===
Source	Ranking	As of
Sabato's Crystal Ball	Lean D (flip)	November 4, 2002
New York Times	Lean D (flip)	October 14, 2002

=== Results ===
Georgia's 11th congressional district election, 2002
Party	Candidate	Votes	%
Republican	Phil Gingrey	69,261	51.62
Democratic	Roger Kahn	64,923	48.38
Total votes		134,184	100.00
Republican hold			

== District 12 ==
2002 Georgia's 12th congressional district election
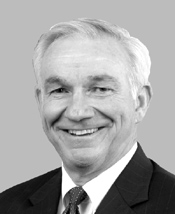

Nominee	Max Burns	Charles Walker, Jr.
Party	Republican	Democratic
Popular vote	77,479	62,904
Percentage	55.19%	44.81%
- Precinct results Burns: 50–60% 60–70% 70–80% 80–90% >90% Walker: 50–60% 60–70% 70–80% 80–90% >90%
U.S. Representative before election
Vacant
(new district)
Elected U.S. Representative
Max Burns
Republican

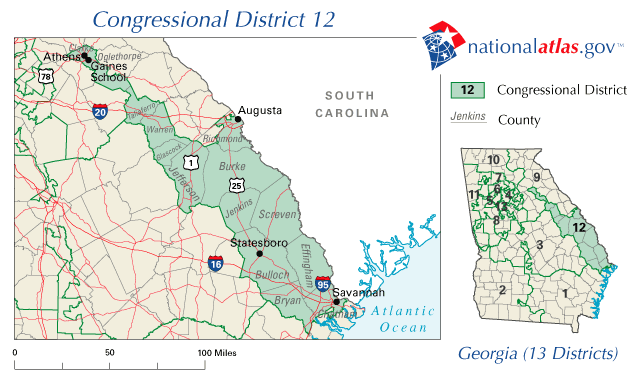

This district, created as a result of Georgia's population growth, was drawn by the Democrats in the Georgia State Legislature to elect a Democrat; given the newly drawn district's high African-American population and the fact that it would have voted for Al Gore in the 2000 presidential election, this was a realistic expectation. Max Burns, a professor at Georgia Southern University and a former Screven County Commissioner, emerged as the Republican nominee while Augusta businessman Charles "Champ" Walker Jr., the son of powerful State Senator Charles Walker, became the Democratic nominee. This solidly Democratic district pulled from Savannah, Augusta, and Athens and was expected to elect Walker. However, when ethical problems emerged for Walker, he began losing ground and eventually lost to Burns by a solid margin.

=== Predictions ===
Source	Ranking	As of
Sabato's Crystal Ball	Lean R (flip)	November 4, 2002
New York Times	Lean D (flip)	October 14, 2002

=== Results ===
Georgia's 12th congressional district election, 2002
Party	Candidate	Votes	%
Republican	Max Burns	77,479	55.19
Democratic	Charles Walker, Jr.	62,904	44.81
Total votes		140,383	100.00
Republican win (new seat)			

== District 13 ==
2002 Georgia's 13th congressional district election
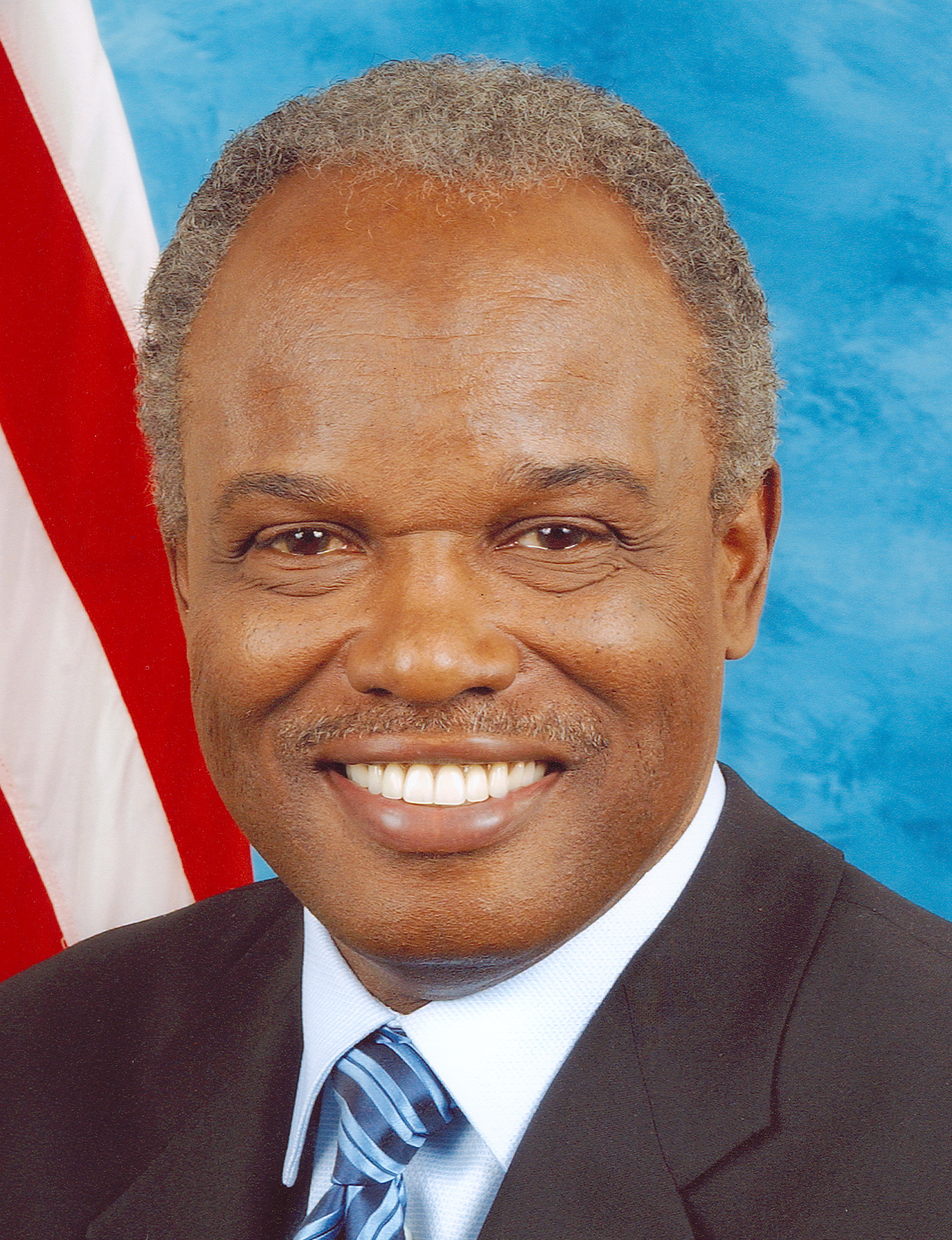

Nominee	David Scott	Clay Cox
Party	Democratic	Republican
Popular vote	70,011	47,405
Percentage	59.63%	40.37%
- Precinct results Scott: 50–60% 60–70% 70–80% 80–90% >90% Cox: 50–60% 60–70% 70–80% 80–90% No votes
U.S. Representative before election
Vacant
(new district)
Elected U.S. Representative
David Scott
Democratic

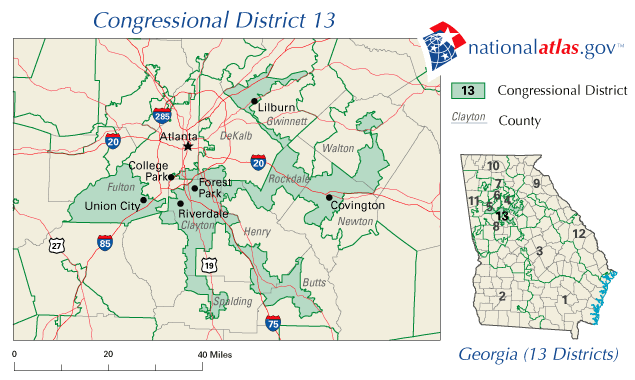

Created as a result of Georgia's population growth, this heavily gerrymandered district surrounded Atlanta and pulled from heavily Democratic communities in the surrounding counties. State Senator David Scott became the Democratic nominee and faced off against Republican Clay Cox, whom he defeated by a fairly solid margin in the general election.

=== Predictions ===
Source	Ranking	As of
Sabato's Crystal Ball	Safe D (flip)	November 4, 2002
New York Times	Safe D (flip)	October 14, 2002

=== Results ===
Georgia's 13th congressional district election, 2002
Party	Candidate	Votes	%
Democratic	David Scott	70,011	59.63
Republican	Clay Cox	47,405	40.37
Total votes		117,416	100.00
Democratic win (new seat)			
