= 2002 Georgia gubernatorial election =

- November 5, 2002
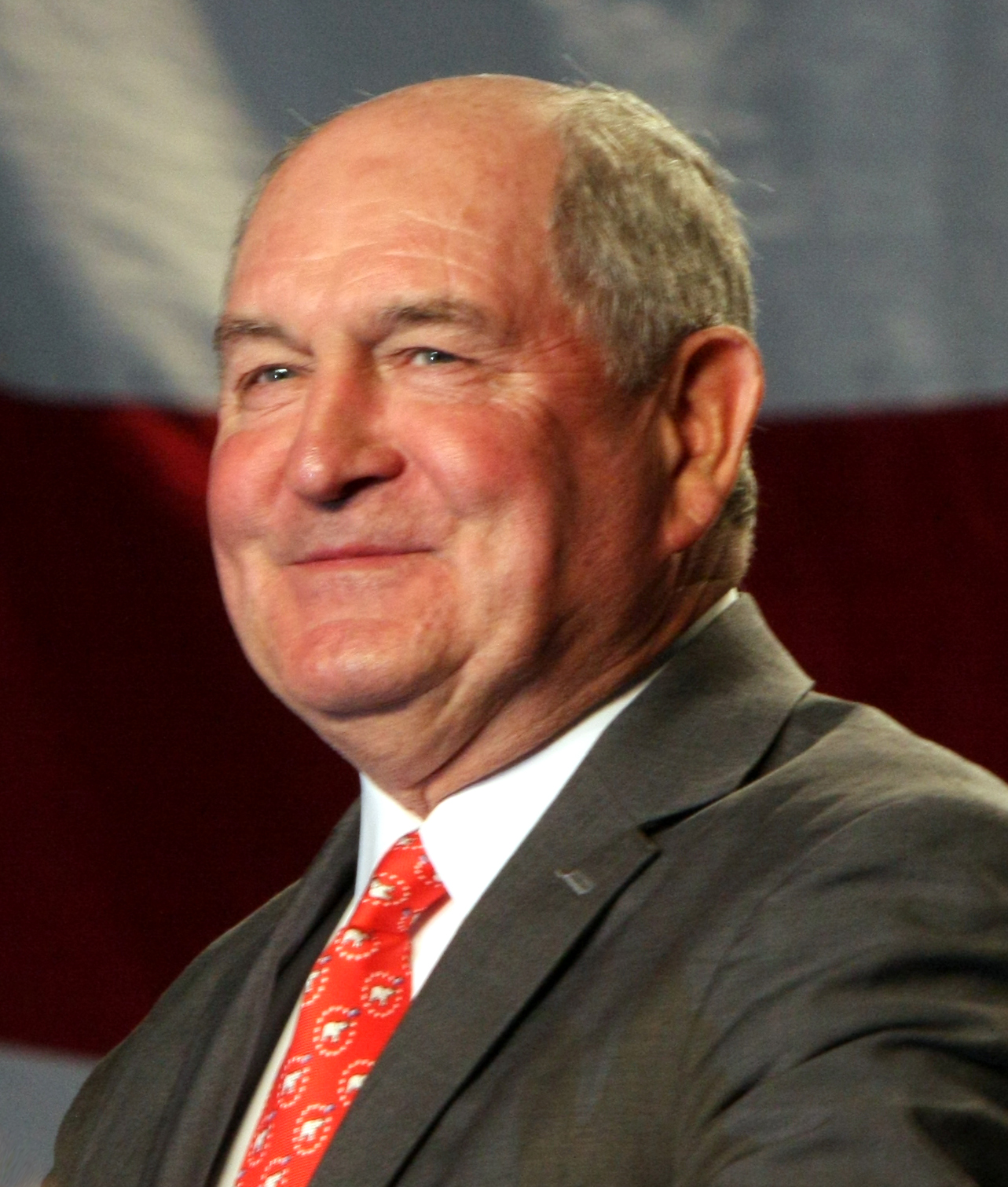

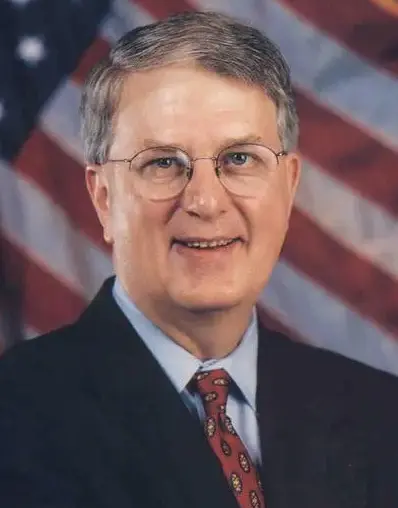
Nominee	Sonny Perdue	Roy Barnes
Party	Republican	Democratic
Popular vote	1,041,677	937,062
Percentage	51.42%	46.25%
- Perdue: 40–50% 50–60% 60–70% 70–80% 80–90% >90% Barnes: 40–50% 50–60% 60–70% 70–80% 80–90% >90% Tie: 40–50% 50% No data
Governor before election
Roy Barnes
Democratic
Elected Governor
Sonny Perdue
Republican

The 2002 Georgia gubernatorial election was held on November 5, 2002. Incumbent Democratic governor Roy Barnes sought re-election to a second term as governor. State Senator Sonny Perdue emerged as the Republican nominee from a crowded and hotly contested primary, and he faced off against Barnes, who had faced no opponents in his primary election, in the general election. Though Barnes had been nicknamed "King Roy" due to his unique ability to get his legislative priorities passed, he faced a backlash among Georgia voters due to his proposal to change the state flag from its Confederate design.

Ultimately, Perdue was able to defeat governor Barnes and became the first Republican to serve as governor of the state since Reconstruction. This was only the second election that a Republican won in the state's history, the other being in 1868. The result was widely considered a major upset. Democrat Max Cleland simultaneously lost his re-election bid to Republican Saxby Chambliss.

As of 2022, this is the last governor election in which Decatur, Grady, Meriwether, and Wilkes counties voted for the Democratic candidate. This is the last time that a gubernatorial nominee and a lieutenant gubernatorial nominee from different political parties were elected governor and lieutenant governor in Georgia. Barnes later unsuccessfully ran for Governor of Georgia again in 2010 when Perdue was term-limited.

== Democratic primary ==
=== Candidates ===
- Roy Barnes, incumbent governor of Georgia

=== Results ===
Democratic primary results
Party	Candidate	Votes	%
Democratic	Roy Barnes (incumbent)	434,892	100.00
Total votes		434,892	100.00

== Republican primary ==
=== Candidates ===
- Sonny Perdue, state senator from Bonaire
- Linda Schrenko, Superintendent of Public Instruction
- Bill Byrne, chairman of the Cobb County Commission

=== Results ===
Primary results by county: Perdue: Perdue—30–40%; Perdue—40–50%; Perdue—50–60%; Perdue—60–70%; Perdue—70–80%; Perdue—80–90%; Perdue—>90%; Schrenko: Schrenko—30–40%; Schrenko—40–50%; Schrenko—50–60%; Schrenko—60–70%; Schrenko—>80%; Bryne: Byrne—40–50%; Byrne—>100%; Tie: Tie between Perdue and Byrne—33%

Republican primary results
Party	Candidate	Votes	%
Republican	Sonny Perdue	259,966	50.83
Republican	Linda Schrenko	142,911	27.94
Republican	Bill Byrne	108,586	21.23
Total votes		511,463	100.00

== General election ==
=== Predictions ===
Source	Ranking	As of
The Cook Political Report	Likely D	October 31, 2002
Sabato's Crystal Ball	Likely D	November 4, 2002

=== Results ===
2002 Georgia gubernatorial election
Party	Candidate	Votes	%	±%
Republican	Sonny Perdue	1,041,677	51.42%	+7.34%
Democratic	Roy Barnes (incumbent)	937,062	46.25%	−6.24%
Libertarian	Garrett Michael Hayes	47,122	2.33%	−1.11%
Total votes		2,025,861	100.00%	N/A
Republican gain from Democratic				

==== Counties that flipped from Democratic to Republican ====
Of Georgia's 159 counties, 74 flipped from Democratic to Republican between the 1998 Georgia gubernatorial election and the 2002 Georgia gubernatorial election.

- Appling (largest city: Baxley)
- Atkinson (largest city: Pearson)
- Bacon (largest city: Alma)
- Baldwin (largest city: Milledgeville)
- Bartow (largest town: Cartersville)
- Ben Hill (largest city: Fitzgerald)
- Berrien (largest city: Nashville)
- Bleckley (largest city: Cochran)
- Brantley (largest city: Nahunta)
- Bulloch (largest city: Statesboro)
- Butts (largest city: Jackson)
- Candler (largest city: Metter)
- Charlton (largest city: Folkston)
- Chattooga (largest city: Summerville)
- Coffee (largest city: Douglas)
- Colquitt (largest city: Moultrie)
- Columbia (largest community: Martinez, a census-designated place)
- Cook (largest city: Adel)
- Crawford (largest city: Roberta)
- Crisp (largest city: Cordele)
- Dodge (largest city: Eastman)
- Dooly (largest city: Vienna)
- Echols (largest community: Statenville)
- Emanuel (largest city: Swainsboro)
- Evans (largest city: Claxton)
- Franklin (largest city: Lavonia)
- Greene (largest city: Greensboro)
- Habersham (largest city: Cornelia)
- Haralson (largest city: Bremen)
- Heard (largest city: Franklin)
- Houston (largest city: Warner Robins)
- Irwin (largest city: Ocilla)
- Jasper (largest city: Monticello)
- Jeff Davis (largest city: Hazlehurst)
- Jenkins (largest city: Millen)
- Johnson (largest city: Wrightsville)
- Jones (largest city: Gray)
- Lamar (largest city: Barnesville)
- Lanier (largest city: Lakeland)
- Laurens (largest city: Dublin)
- Lincoln (largest city: Lincolnton)
- Long (largest city: Ludowici)
- Lowndes (largest city: Valdosta)
- Lumpkin (largest city: Dahlonega)
- McDuffie (largest city: Thomson)
- Miller (largest city: Colquitt)
- Monroe (largest city: Forsyth)
- Montgomery (largest city: Mount Vernon)
- Morgan (largest city: Madison)
- Peach (largest city: Fort Valley)
- Pierce (largest city: Blackshear)
- Polk (largest city: Cedartown)
- Pulaski (largest town: Hawkinsville)
- Putnam (largest city: Eatonton)
- Rabun (largest city: Clayton)
- Schley (largest city: Ellaville)
- Screven (largest city: Sylvania)
- Seminole (largest city: Donalsonville)
- Sumter (largest city: Americus)
- Tattnall (largest city: Glennville)
- Telfair (largest city: McRae-Helena)
- Thomas (largest city: Thomasville)
- Tift (largest city: Tifton)
- Toombs (largest city: Vidalia)
- Towns (largest city: Young Harris)
- Treutlen (largest city: Soperton)
- Turner (largest city: Ashburn)
- Union (largest city: Blairsville)
- Upson (largest city: Thomaston)
- Ware (largest city: Waycross)
- Wayne (largest city: Jesup)
- Wheeler (largest city: Alamo)
- Wilcox (largest city: Abbeville)
- Worth (largest city: Sylvester)

== See also ==
- 2002 United States gubernatorial elections
- 2002 United States Senate election in Georgia
- 2002 United States House of Representatives elections in Georgia
- State of Georgia
- Governors of Georgia
