= 2004 United States Senate election in Georgia =

- November 2, 2004
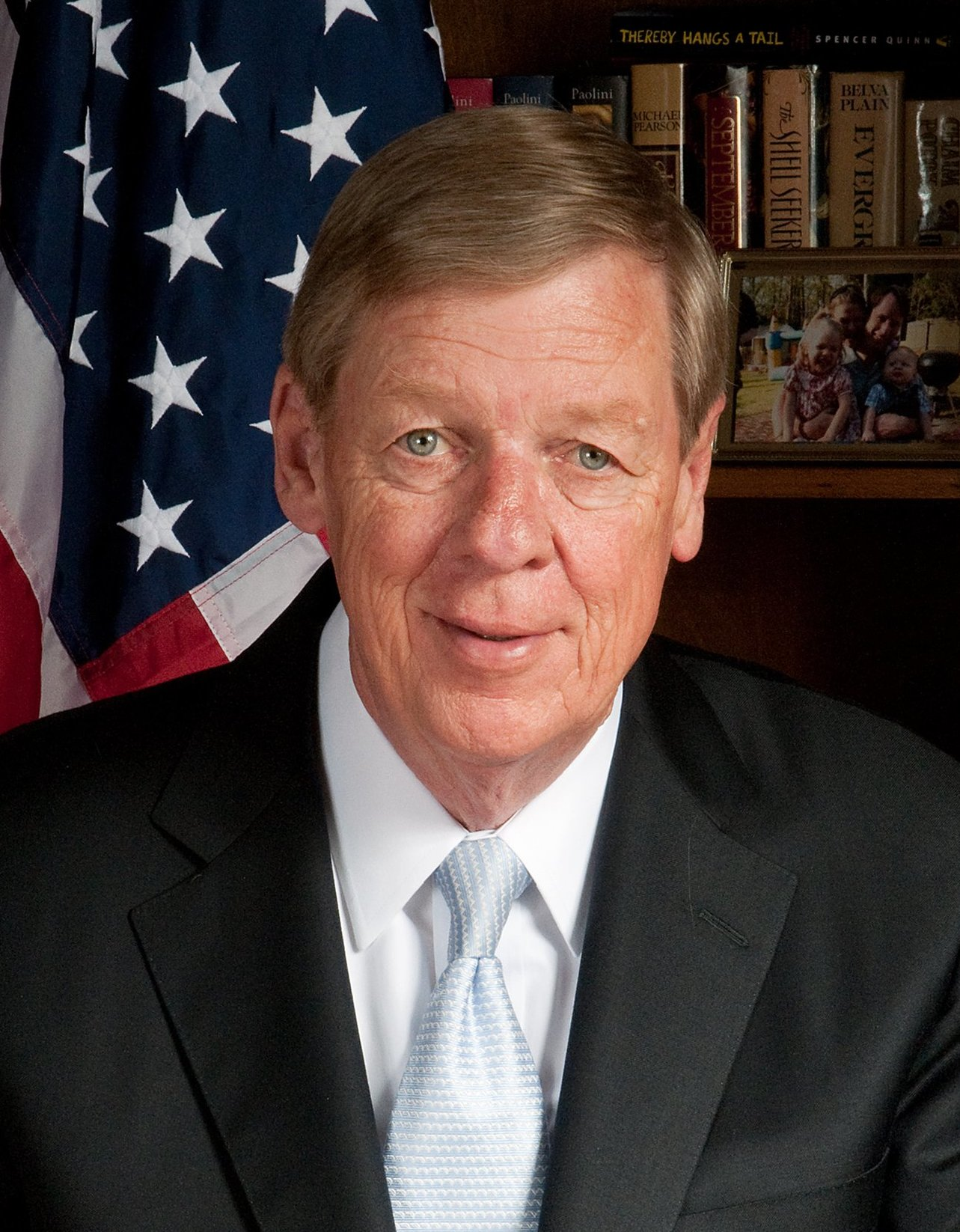

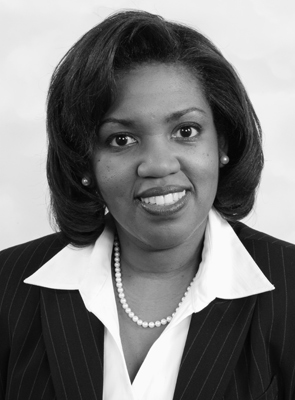
Nominee	Johnny Isakson	Denise Majette
Party	Republican	Democratic
Popular vote	1,864,205	1,287,695
Percentage	57.88%	39.98%
- Isakson: 40–50% 50–60% 60–70% 70–80% 80–90% >90% Majette: 40–50% 50–60% 60–70% 70–80% 80–90% >90% Tie: 40–50% 50% No data
U.S. senator before election
Zell Miller
Democratic
Elected U.S. Senator
Johnny Isakson
Republican

The 2004 United States Senate election in Georgia took place on November 2, 2004, alongside other elections to the United States Senate in other states as well as elections to the United States House of Representatives and various state and local elections. This was the fifth consecutive even-numbered year in which a senate election was held in Georgia, after elections in 1996, 1998, 2000, and 2002. Incumbent Democratic U.S. Senator Zell Miller decided to retire instead of seeking a first full term in office, leaving an open seat.

Representative Johnny Isakson, a Republican and former gubernatorial candidate, won the open seat, defeating Democratic nominee Denise Majette, who was both the first African American and the first woman to be nominated for Senate in Georgia. Isakson would remain in the Senate until his resignation on December 31, 2019. This election was the first open-seat Senate election in Georgia for this seat since 1956, and marked the first time that Republicans held both of the state’s Senate seats.

== Democratic primary ==
Following reports that Miller would retire, Democratic leaders unsuccessfully tried to convince outgoing Governor Roy Barnes to run for Senate. Max Cleland, a former senator who lost his seat in the 2002 election, was also considered a possible candidate before choosing not to run.

Majette's announcement that she would seek to replace Miller caught Democrats by surprise, as she was not on anyone's call list when Democrats began seeking a candidate to replace Miller. Further skepticism among Democrats about the viability of her candidacy surfaced when she announced that God had told her to run for the Senate.

Nominee:

- Denise Majette, U.S. representative from Decatur

Eliminated in runoff:

- Cliff Oxford, businessman

Eliminated in primary:

- Leigh Baier
- Jim Boyd, perennial candidate
- Sid Cottingham
- James N. Filkelstein
- Govind N. Patel
- Mary Squires, former state senator

Declined to run:

- Roy Barnes, former governor of Georgia
- Max Cleland, former senator
- Zell Miller, incumbent senator
- Michelle Nunn, nonprofit executive and daughter of former Senator Sam Nunn

=== Initial results ===
Results for the first round showed that Denise Majette did not win a majority of the vote, so a runoff was held between her and Cliff Oxford.

2004 Georgia U.S. Senate Democratic primary election
Party	Candidate	Votes	%
Democratic	Denise Majette	258,480	41.3%
Democratic	Cliff Oxford	128,540	20.6%
Democratic	Jim Boyd	87,702	14.3%
Democratic	Mary Squires	55,046	8.1%
Democratic	Leigh Baier	47,487	7.6%
Democratic	Sid Cottingham	16,200	2.9%
Democratic	Govind N. Patel	9,166	1.4%
Total votes		625,154	100.0%

=== Runoff ===
2004 Georgia U.S. Senate Democratic primary election runoff
Party	Candidate	Votes	%
Democratic	Denise Majette	161,733	59.4%
Democratic	Cliff Oxford	110,526	40.6%

== Republican primary ==
=== Candidates ===
Nominee

- Johnny Isakson, U.S. representative from Marietta and candidate for the United States Senate in 1996

Defeated in primary

- Herman Cain, former CEO of Godfather's Pizza
- Mac Collins, U.S. representative from Butts County

Declined to run

- Ralph Reed, chair of the Georgia Republican Party

=== Campaign ===
Positioning himself as a political outsider, businessman Herman Cain spent nearly $1 million of his own money on his Senate campaign. To discredit Cain, Isakson's campaign dropped campaign mail pieces noting that Cain had donated to Democrats in the past, such as Hillary Clinton and Ted Kennedy.

=== Results ===
Primary results by county Isakson: 30–40%; 40–50%; 50–60%; 60–70%; 70–80%; 80–90%; 100%; Cain: 40–50%; 50–60%; 60–70%; Collins: 30–40%; 40–50%; 50–60%; 60–70%; 70–80%

Republican primary election
Party	Candidate	Votes	%
Republican	Johnny Isakson	346,765	53.2%
Republican	Herman Cain	170,464	26.2%
Republican	Mac Collins	134,053	20.6%

== General election ==
=== Candidates ===
- Allen Buckley (Libertarian)
- Johnny Isakson, U.S. representative from Marietta (Republican)
- Denise Majette, U.S. representative from Decatur (Democratic)

=== Campaign ===
Majette received extremely important endorsements from U.S. Senators Mary Landrieu of Louisiana and Debbie Stabenow of Michigan, along with many others in Washington who campaigned and raised money for Majette. Her Senate campaign slogan was "I'll be nobody's Senator, but yours."

A number of factors led to Majette's loss. These include her late start, her valuable time and money spent in the runoff, larger conservative turnout from a proposed constitutional amendment banning same-sex marriages (which Majette opposed), the popularity of President George W. Bush in Georgia, and her lack of experience (being a one-term congresswoman).

=== Debates ===
- Complete video of debate, October 31, 2004

=== Predictions ===
Source	Ranking	As of
Sabato's Crystal Ball	Safe R (flip)	November 1, 2004

=== Polling ===
Poll source	Date(s) administered	Sample size (Note: Key: A – all adults RV – registered voters LV – likely voters V – unclear)	Margin of error	Johnny Isakson (R)	Denise Majette (D)	Other / Undecided
SurveyUSA	October 28–30, 2004	624 (LV)	± 4.0%	56%	40%	5%

=== Results ===
2004 United States Senate election, Georgia
Party	Candidate	Votes	%	±%
Republican	Johnny Isakson	1,864,205	57.88%	+19.97%
Democratic	Denise Majette	1,287,695	39.98%	−18.22%
Libertarian	Allen Buckley	69,051	2.14%	+2.14%
Majority		576,510	17.90%	
Turnout		3,220,951		
Republican gain from Democratic		Swing		

==== Counties that flipped from Democratic to Republican ====
- Atkinson (largest city: Pearson)
- Baldwin (largest city: Milledgeville)
- Ben Hill (largest city: Fitzgerald)
- Berrien (largest city: Nashville)
- Brooks (largest city: Quitman)
- Butts (largest city: Jackson)
- Chatham (largest city: Savannah)
- Chattooga (largest city: Summerville)
- Clinch (largest city: Homerville)
- Cook (largest city: Adel)
- Crawford (largest city: Roberta)
- Crisp (largest city: Cordele)
- Decatur (largest city: Bainbridge)
- Dodge (largest city: Eastman)
- Early (largest city: Blakely)
- Elbert (largest city: Elberton)
- Emanuel (largest city: Swainsboro)
- Grady (largest city: Cairo)
- Greene (largest city: Greensboro)
- Hart (largest city: Hartwell)
- Heard (largest city: Franklin)
- Irwin (largest city: Ocilla)
- Jasper (largest city: Monticello)
- Jenkins (largest city: Millen)
- Johnson (largest city: Wrightsville)
- Lamar (largest city: Barnesville)
- Lanier (largest city: Lakeland)
- Long (largest city: Ludowici)
- Marion (largest city: Buena Vista)
- Miller (largest city: Colquitt)
- Montgomery (largest city: Mount Vernon)
- Polk (largest city: Cedartown)
- Pulaski (largest city: Hawkinsville)
- Putnam (largest city: Eatonton)
- Schley (largest city: Ellaville)
- Screven (largest city: Sylvania)
- Seminole (largest city: Donalsonville)
- Sumter (largest city: Americus)
- Taylor (largest city: Butler)
- Treutlen (largest city: Soperton)
- Turner (largest city: Ashburn)
- Wheeler (largest city: Alamo)
- Wilcox (largest city: Abbeville)
- Wilkes (largest city: Washington)
- Burke (largest municipality: Waynesboro)
- Chattahoochee (largest municipality: Cusseta)
- McIntosh (largest municipality: Darien)
- Meriwether (largest municipality: Manchester)
- Mitchell (largest municipality: Camilla)
- Peach (largest municipality: Fort Valley)
- Telfair (largest municipality: McRae-Helena)
- Washington (largest municipality: Sandersville)
- Wilkinson (largest municipality: Gordon)
- Bibb (largest city: Macon)
- Jefferson (largest city: Louisville)
- Warren (largest city: Warrenton)
- Dooly (largest city: Vienna)
- Cobb (largest city: Marietta)
- Gwinnett (largest city: Peachtree Corners)
- Henry (largest city: Stockbridge)
- Rockdale (largest town: Conyers)
- Bacon (largest town: Alma)
- Banks (largest town: Baldwin)
- Bartow (largest town: Cartersville)
- Bleckley (largest town: Cochran)
- Brantley (largest town: Nahunta)
- Bryan (largest town: Richmond Hill)
- Bulloch (largest town: Stateboro)
- Camden (largest town: St. Marys)
- Candler (largest town: Metter)
- Carroll (largest town: Carrollton)
- Catoosa (largest town: Fort Oglethorpe)
- Charlton (largest town: Folkston)
- Coffee (largest town: Douglas)
- Colquitt (largest town: Moultrie)
- Dade (largest town: Trenton)
- Dawson (largest town: Dawsonville)
- Douglas (largest town: Douglasville)
- Echols (largest town: Statenville)
- Effingham (largest town: Rincon)
- Evans (largest town: Claxton)
- Fannin (largest town: Blue Ridge)
- Floyd (largest town: Rome)
- Franklin (largest town: Lavonia)
- Glascock (largest town: Gibson)
- Gordon (largest town: Calhoun)
- Habersham (largest town: Cornelia)
- Hall (largest town: Gainesville)
- Gilmer (largest town: Ellijay)
- Harris (largest town: Pine Mountain)
- Haralson (largest town: Bremen)
- Houston (largest town: Warner Robins)
- Jones (largest town: Gray)
- Jackson (largest town: Jefferson)
- Jeff Davis (largest town: Hazlehurst)
- Lincoln (largest town: Lincolnton)
- Lowndes (largest town: Valdosta)
- Lumpkin (largest town: Dahlonega)
- Madison (largest town: Comer)
- McDuffie (largest town: Thomson)
- Monroe (largest town: Forsyth)
- Murray (largest town: Chatsworth)
- Newton (largest town: Covington)
- Oconee (largest town: Watkinsville)
- Oglethorpe (largest town: Crawford)
- Paulding (largest town: Dallas)
- Morgan (largest town: Madison)
- Pike (largest town: Zebulon)
- Pickens (largest town: Jasper)
- Rabun (largest town: Clayton)
- Spalding (largest town: Griffin)
- Stephens (largest town: Toccoa)
- Tattnall (largest town: Glennville)
- Tifton (largest town: Tifton)
- Towns (largest town: Young Harris)
- Troup (largest town: LaGrange)
- Union (largest town: Blairsville)
- Upson (largest town: Thomaston)
- Walton (largest town: Monroe)
- Ware (largest town: Waycross)
- Walker (largest town: Lafayette)
- Wayne (largest town: Jesup)
- White (largest town: Cleveland)
- Whitfield (largest town: Dalton)
- Worth (largest town: Sylvester)
- Appling (largest town: Baxley)
- Thomas (largest town: Thomasville)
- Laurens (largest town: Dublin)

== See also ==
- 2004 United States Senate elections
