= Denise Majette =

American politician (born 1955)

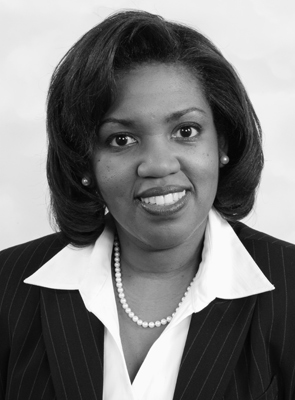

Member of the U.S. House of Representatives from Georgia's 4th district
- In office January 3, 2003 – January 3, 2005
- Preceded by: Cynthia McKinney
- Succeeded by: Cynthia McKinney

Personal details
- Born: Denise Lorraine Majette; May 18, 1955 (age 71) New York City, New York, U.S.
- Party: Democratic
- Education: Yale University (BA); Duke University (JD)
- Majette's voice Majette on violence against women. Recorded June 22, 2004

Denise Lorraine Majette (born May 18, 1955) is an American politician from the state of Georgia. A Democrat, she represented Georgia's 4th congressional district in the United States House of Representatives from 2003 to 2005.

== Biography ==
Born in Brooklyn, she attended Yale University and completed a Juris Doctor degree at Duke University in 1979. She began her legal career in North Carolina as a Legal Aid staff attorney and a clinical adjunct law professor at Wake Forest University. A resident of the Atlanta suburb of Stone Mountain since 1983, Majette worked in private law practice before being named an administrative law judge at the Georgia state board of workers' compensation in 1992. The following year, Georgia Governor Zell Miller appointed her judge of the State Court of DeKalb County. Majette held the judgeship for nine years.

She resigned from the judgeship in 2002 to run for the U.S. House of Representatives in Georgia's 4th congressional district, which is based in DeKalb County. She defeated 10-year incumbent Cynthia McKinney in the Democratic primary. Majette, who had never run in a partisan contest before, defeated McKinney by a 58% to 42% margin. McKinney had attracted controversy due to her comments after the September 11 attacks. The primary was also influenced by crossover-Republicans—i.e., Republicans who used their ability to vote in a Democratic primary in Georgia. Majette's upset win was tantamount to election in this heavily Democratic, black-majority district.

In Congress, Majette's voting record was slightly more moderate than that of McKinney. Nonetheless, she is considered fairly liberal by national Democratic standards. Among other issues, she supports affirmative action, abortion rights, and legal status for illegal immigrants working in the U.S., while she opposes school vouchers and the death penalty.

== Runs for higher office ==
After one term in the U.S. House, Majette decided to run for the U.S. Senate seat being vacated by Zell Miller, who had been appointed to the seat in 2000 following the death of Republican Paul Coverdell. Miller's decision not to seek a full term in the Senate had caught the Georgia Democrats by surprise. Majette's announcement that she would seek to replace Miller also caught Democrats by surprise, as she was not on anyone's call list when Democrats began seeking a candidate to replace Miller. Further skepticism among Democrats about the viability of her candidacy surfaced when she announced that "God" had told her to run for the Senate.

Majette finished first in the Democratic primary but was forced into a runoff against millionaire businessman Cliff Oxford, which she won. She received important endorsements from Senators Mary Landrieu of Louisiana and Debbie Stabenow of Michigan, along with many others in Washington who campaigned and raised money for Majette. Her Senate campaign slogan was "I'll be nobody's Senator, but yours." Majette was the first African American and the first woman to be nominated for the U.S. Senate in Georgia.

In the general election, despite her vigorous attacks against her Republican opponent, 6th District Congressman Johnny Isakson, Majette was defeated, losing by 18 points.

A number of factors led to the severe defeat. Majette was badly underfinanced and had to spend valuable time and money in the runoff. In contrast, Isakson had won the Republican nomination by an unexpectedly large margin. Due to her late entry in the race, she had little time or chance to make up ground on Isakson. A proposed amendment to the Georgia Constitution banning same-sex marriages (which Majette opposed) boosted Republican turnout significantly; it not only passed by a wide margin statewide, but carried in every county, even DeKalb. She got little help from the top of the ticket; John Kerry had effectively ceded Georgia to George W. Bush early in the presidential campaign.

McKinney regained her seat in the 2004 election.

== Later career ==
Soon after leaving the House, Majette entered private law practice in Atlanta. In March 2006, Majette announced her candidacy for state School Superintendent of Georgia. She defeated substitute teacher Carlotta Harrell in the primary, garnering 67% of the vote. In the general election, however, Majette lost to Republican incumbent Kathy Cox by a large margin.

=== Disbarment ===
On March 28, 2014, the Georgia Supreme Court disbarred Majette, finding that she overbilled clients and misled the Court about how much she was owed in fees.

== Electoral history ==
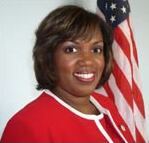
Congressional photo of Denise Majette.

Georgia's 4th congressional district: 2002 results
Year	Democrat	Votes	Pct	Republican	Votes	Pct
2002	Denise L. Majette	118,045	77%	Cynthia Van Auken	35,202	23%

Georgia Senator (Class III): 2004 results
Year	Democrat	Votes	Pct	Republican	Votes	Pct	3rd Party	Party	Votes	Pct	
2004	Denise L. Majette	1,287,690	40%	Johnny Isakson	1,864,202	58%	Allen Buckley	Libertarian	69,051	2%	*

*Write-in and minor candidate notes: In 2004, write-ins received 31 votes and Matthew Jamison received 7 votes.

== See also ==
- List of African-American United States representatives
- Women in the United States House of Representatives
- List of African-American United States Senate candidates

U.S. House of Representatives
Preceded by Cynthia McKinney	Member of the U.S. House of Representatives from Georgia's 4th congressional district 2003–2005	Succeeded by Cynthia McKinney
Party political offices
Preceded by Zell Miller	Democratic nominee for U.S. Senator from Georgia (Class 3); 2004	Succeeded by Mike Thurmond
Preceded by Barbara Christmas	Democratic nominee for Georgia Superintendent of Schools; 2006	Succeeded by Joe Martin
U.S. order of precedence (ceremonial)
Preceded by Max Burns as Former U.S. Representative	Order of precedence of the United States as Former U.S. Representative	Succeeded by Karen Handel as Former U.S. Representative
