= Max Burns =

American politician (born 1948)

Member of the Georgia State Senate from the 23rd district
- Incumbent
- Assumed office January 11, 2021
- Preceded by: Jesse Stone

President of Gordon State College
- In office January 2012 – December 2017
- Preceded by: Shelly Nickel
- Succeeded by: Kirk Nooks

Member of the U.S. House of Representatives from Georgia's 12th district
- In office January 3, 2003 – January 3, 2005
- Preceded by: Constituency established
- Succeeded by: John Barrow

Personal details
- Born: Othell Maxie Burns Jr. November 8, 1948 (age 77) Millen, Georgia, U.S.
- Party: Republican
- Spouse: Lora Burns
- Children: 2
- Education: Georgia Institute of Technology (BS); Georgia State University (MBA, DBA)

Othell Maxie Burns Jr. (born November 8, 1948) is an American politician and academic from the state of Georgia. A member of the Republican Party, Burns has represented the 23rd district in the Georgia State Senate since January 2021. He previously served in the United States House of Representatives from 2003 to 2005, representing Georgia's 12th congressional district. From 2012 to 2017 he was the president of Gordon State College in Barnesville, Georgia.

== Early life and education ==
Max Burns was born in Millen, Georgia. Burns received a Bachelor of Science degree in industrial engineering from the Georgia Institute of Technology, a Master of Business Administration in information systems from Georgia State University and a Doctor of Business Administration from Georgia State University.

== Career ==
Burns also served as a member of the United States Army Reserve from 1973 to 1981. He served as a member of the Screven County Commission from 1993 to 1998 and as chairman towards the end of his tenure.

Prior to his tenure in Congress, he was a professor of information systems at Georgia Southern University's College of Business Administration in Statesboro, Georgia. Burns was also a Senior Fulbright Scholar, teaching Corporate Information Management in Sweden. He has also taught in Australia, New Zealand, and South Korea.

Burns has also worked as a consultant to Gulfstream Aerospace and Grinnell Mechanical Products. He also developed the Southern Suppliers' Network to connect Southeast Georgia's small business suppliers to major manufacturers. Earlier in his professional career, the Congressman served in information management positions with Oxford Industries and the North American Mission Board of the Southern Baptist Convention.

After leaving Congress, Burns was dean of the Mike Cottrell Business School at North Georgia College & State University in Dahlonega, Georgia.

After his final bid to regain his congressional seat, Burns served as senior policy adviser at Thelen, Reid and Priest, LLP in Washington, D.C. He also served as associate dean and chair of the business administration department at the Cottrell School of Business at North Georgia College & State University. In 2011, he was appointed as president of Gordon College. He served in that role until his retirement on December 31, 2017.

In January 2024, Burns co-sponsored S.B. 390, which would withhold government funding for any libraries in Georgia affiliated with the American Library Association.

== Elections ==
=== 2002 ===
Burns won the Republican primary for the 12th district, one of two Georgia gained after the 2000 Census. He defeated Barbara Dooley, the wife of University of Georgia coaching legend Vince Dooley.

Initially, Burns was thought to be a significant underdog in the general election. The 12th had been drawn as a Democratic stronghold. Additionally, Burns ran on a very conservative platform. However, the Democratic candidate, Augusta businessman Charles "Champ" Walker Jr., son of state Senate majority leader Charles Walker Sr., was dogged by ethical questions and began losing ground during the summer. Eventually, Burns won by a surprising 10-point margin, taking 55% to Walker's 45 percent.

=== 2004 ===
Burns was elected president of the Republican freshman class, but was a top Democratic target in the 2004 elections. His 2004 Democratic opponent was Athens-Clarke County Commissioner John Barrow, who beat Burns 52% to 48%.

=== 2006 ===
In May 2005, Burns announced that he would seek a rematch against Barrow in 2006. The state legislature, now controlled by Republicans, had conducted a highly controversial mid-decade redistricting. In the process, they drew Barrow's home in Athens out of the district and moved several Republican-leaning Savannah suburbs from the 1st District. Although the result was to make the 12th about five points more African-American than its predecessor, it was also slightly less Democratic.

Barrow narrowly defeated Burns, 50.3% to 49.7%, the closest margin for a Democratic incumbent in the cycle. While Burns won 14 of the district's 22 counties, he lost in the two largest counties, Chatham and Richmond, home to Savannah and Augusta respectively. President George W. Bush made two personal appearances campaigning on behalf of former Representative Burns. The first appearance by President Bush was in Savannah, Georgia and the second in Statesboro, Georgia. This was the second time a sitting president has visited Savannah Georgia and first time a sitting president has visited Statesboro Georgia.

== Electoral history ==
Georgia's 12th congressional district: Results 2002–2006
Year	Democrat	Votes	Pct	Republican	Votes	Pct
2002	Champ Walker	62,904	45%	Max Burns	77,479	55%
2004	John Barrow	113,036	52%	Max Burns	105,132	48%
2006	John Barrow	71,651	50%	Max Burns	70,787	50%

U.S. House of Representatives
New constituency	Member of the U.S. House of Representatives from Georgia's 12th congressional district 2003–2005	Succeeded by John Barrow
U.S. order of precedence (ceremonial)
Preceded by Don Johnson Jr. as Former U.S. Representative	Order of precedence of the United States as Former U.S. Representative	Succeeded by Denise Majette as Former U.S. Representative
