= 2002 United States Senate election in Georgia =

- November 5, 2002
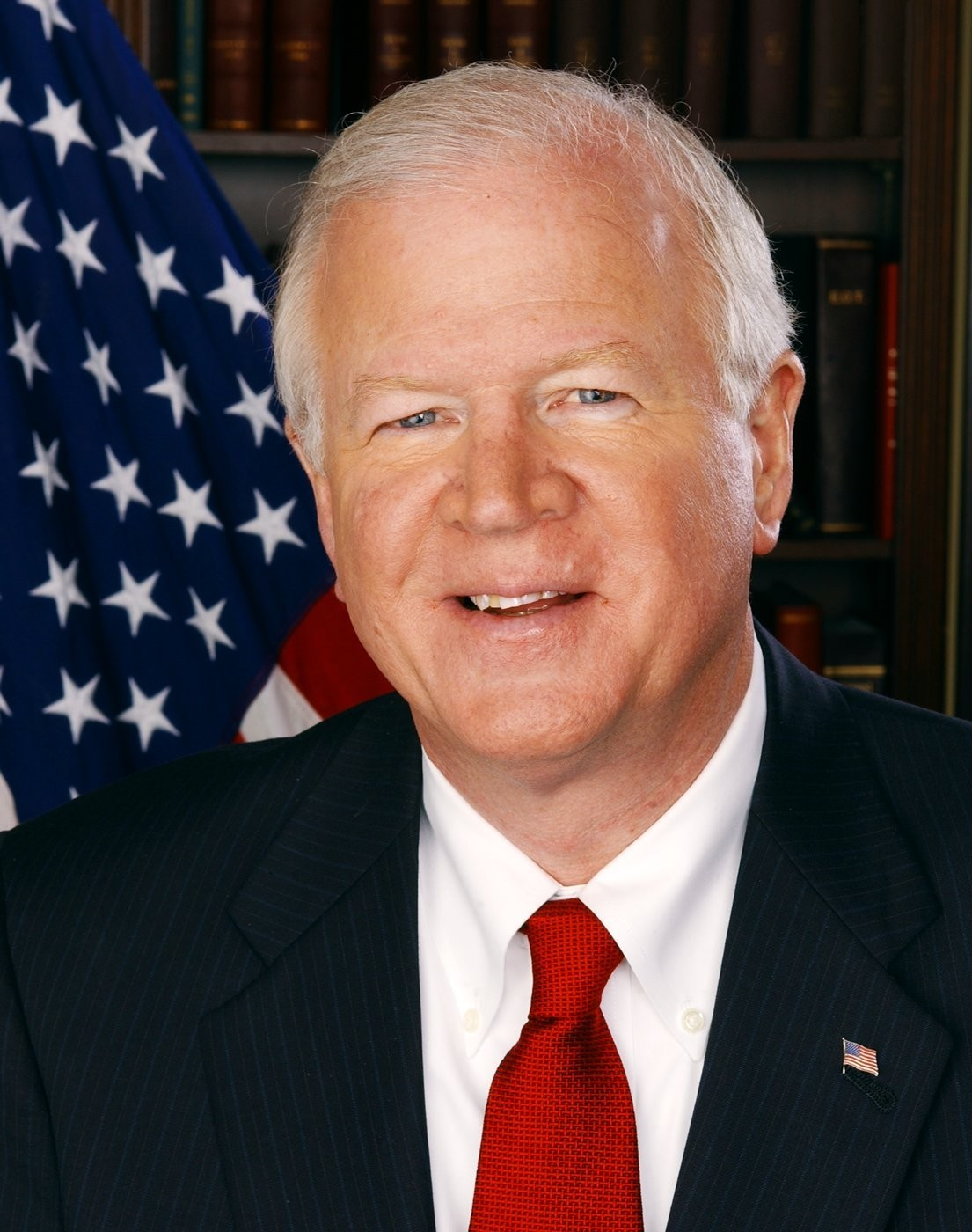

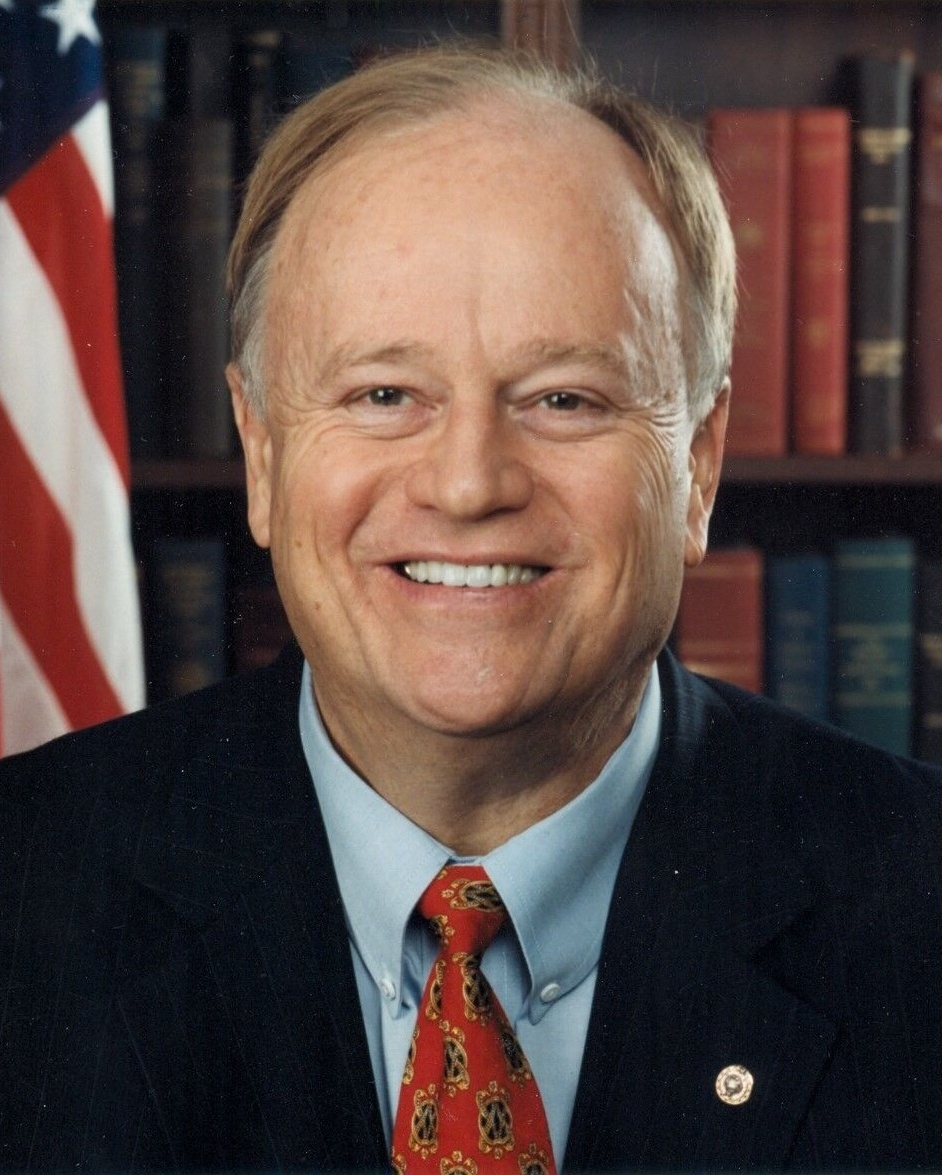
Nominee	Saxby Chambliss	Max Cleland
Party	Republican	Democratic
Popular vote	1,071,153	931,857
Percentage	52.77%	45.90%
- Chambliss: 40–50% 50–60% 60–70% 70–80% 80–90% >90% Cleland: 40–50% 50–60% 60–70% 70–80% 80–90% >90% Tie: 40–50% 50% No data
U.S. Senator before election
Max Cleland
Democratic
Elected U.S. Senator
Saxby Chambliss
Republican

The 2002 United States Senate election in Georgia took place on November 5, 2002. Incumbent Democratic U.S. Senator Max Cleland ran for re-election to a second term but was defeated by Republican Saxby Chambliss by nearly a seven-point margin, becoming the first Republican ever to win the state's Class 2 Senate seat. This was one of the six Democratic-held Senate seats up for election in a state that George W. Bush won in the 2000 presidential election.

Democrat Roy Barnes simultaneously lost the gubernatorial election to Republican Sonny Perdue, marking just the sixth time in the last 50 years in which U.S. Senate and gubernatorial incumbents from the same political party were simultaneously defeated in the same state. (Note: The others were 1972 in Delaware, 1974 in Colorado and Ohio, 1978 in Minnesota, and 1980 in Washington.)

== Democratic primary ==
Max Cleland, the incumbent U.S. senator, won renomination unopposed.

== Republican primary ==
Three candidates ran in the primary:

- Robert Brown, rancher from Yatesville
- Saxby Chambliss, U.S. representative from Moultrie
- Bob Irvin, state representative from Fulton County

Chambliss won easily, carrying nearly every county.

Republican primary results
Party	Candidate	Votes	%
Republican	Saxby Chambliss	300,371	61.1
Republican	Bob Irvin	132,132	26.9
Republican	Robert Brown	59,109	12.0
Total votes		491,612	100.00

== Campaign ==
Chambliss's campaign used themes of national defense and security, but drew criticism for television ads that paired images of Cleland and Osama bin Laden and Saddam Hussein, and for questioning the commitment to homeland security of his opponent, a triple amputee and decorated Vietnam veteran. Republican Senator and fellow Vietnam veteran John McCain of Arizona said of one ad, "It's worse than disgraceful, it's reprehensible." McCain, along with Republican Senator and fellow Vietnam veteran Chuck Hagel of Nebraska, made significant complaints to the Republican National Committee until the ads were taken down. Political strategist Rick Wilson received criticism from numerous journalists for his role in the ad, including from Glenn Greenwald, Charlie Pierce, and the Center for Public Integrity.

=== Debates ===
- Complete video of debate, October 27, 2002

=== Predictions ===
Source	Ranking	As of
Sabato's Crystal Ball	Lean D	November 4, 2002

=== Results ===
General election results
Party	Candidate	Votes	%
Republican	Saxby Chambliss	1,071,153	52.77%
Democratic	Max Cleland (incumbent)	931,857	45.90%
Libertarian	Claude Thomas	26,981	1.33%
Total votes		2,029,991	100.0%
Republican gain from Democratic			

==== Counties that flipped from Democratic to Republican ====
- Atkinson (largest city: Pearson)
- Baldwin (largest city: Milledgeville)
- Berrien (largest city: Nashville)
- Butts (largest city: Jackson)
- Chattooga (largest city: Summerville)
- Clinch (largest city: Homerville)
- Cook (largest city: Adel)
- Crawford (largest city: Roberta)
- Crisp (largest city: Cordele)
- Dodge (largest city: Eastman)
- Emanuel (largest city: Swainsboro)
- Greene (largest city: Greensboro)
- Heard (largest city: Franklin)
- Irwin (largest city: Ocilla)
- Jasper (largest city: Monticello)
- Jenkins (largest city: Millen)
- Johnson (largest city: Wrightsville)
- Lamar (largest city: Barnesville)
- Lanier (largest city: Lakeland)
- Miller (largest city: Colquitt)
- Montgomery (largest city: Mount Vernon)
- Polk (largest city: Cedartown)
- Pulaski (largest city: Hawkinsville)
- Putnam (largest city: Eatonton)
- Schley (largest city: Ellaville)
- Screven (largest city: Sylvania)
- Sumter (largest city: Americus)
- Treutlen (largest city: Soperton)
- Turner (largest city: Ashburn)
- Wheeler (largest city: Alamo)
- Wilcox (largest city: Abbeville)
- Coffee (largest town: Douglas)
- Colquitt (largest town: Moultrie)
- Echols (largest town: Statenville)
- Evans (largest town: Claxton)
- Bleckley (largest town: Cochran)
- Candler (largest town: Metter)
- Lowndes (largest town: Valdosta)
- Haralson (largest town: Bremen)
- Houston (largest town: Warner Robins)
- Jones (largest town: Gray)
- Jeff Davis (largest town: Hazlehurst)
- Monroe (largest town: Forsyth)
- Morgan (largest town: Madison)
- Lincoln (largest town: Lincolnton)
- Tattnall (largest town: Glennville)
- Tifton (largest town: Tifton)
- Upson (largest town: Thomaston)
- Thomas (largest town: Thomasville)
- Laurens (largest town: Dublin)
- Franklin (largest town: Lavonia)
- Glascock (largest town: Gibson)
- Ware (largest town: Waycross)
- Peach (largest municipality: Fort Valley)
- Telfair (largest municipality: McRae-Helena)
- Wayne (largest town: Jesup)
- Worth (largest town: Sylvester)
- Bacon (largest town: Alma)
- Brantley (largest town: Nahunta)

== See also ==
- 2002 United States Senate elections
