= 1996 Georgia state elections =

1996 Georgia elections
- November 6, 1996

The 1996 Georgia elections were held on November 6, 1996. They included the presidential election, in which Republican Bob Dole carried the state over Democratic incumbent Bill Clinton; federal congressional elections; and state-level races including elections to the Georgia General Assembly. A special election was also held for Secretary of State following the resignation of Max Cleland, who had left the position to run for the United States Senate.

== Federal elections ==
=== President ===
Republican U.S. Senator Bob Dole carried Georgia against Democratic incumbent Bill Clinton, who won nationwide.

=== Congressional elections ===
Following the retirement of Sam Nunn, Democratic Secretary of State Max Cleland ran for the United States Senate in 1996 and won by 30,024 votes over Republican Guy Millner. Republicans retained a majority in Georgia's congressional delegation.

== State elections ==
=== Secretary of State special election ===
A special election was held for Secretary of State following the 1996 resignation of Cleland. Democratic incumbent Lewis A. Massey, who was appointed to the position by Zell Miller to succeed Cleland, defeated Republican candidate David Shafer with 53.8% of the vote.

=== Georgia General Assembly ===
Members were elected to the 144th Georgia General Assembly.
