= 1994 Georgia state elections =

1994 Georgia elections
- November 8, 1994

The primary was held on July 19, 1994, with a runoff held on August 9. The general election was held on November 8, 1994.

== State elections ==
=== Governor ===
Democratic incumbent Zell Miller defeated three other candidates to win the Democratic primary. Miller defeated Republican businessman Guy Millner in the general election with a victory of 51% to 48%.

=== Lieutenant Governor ===
Democratic incumbent Pierre Howard defeated Republican State Senator Nancy Schaefer and Libertarian Walker Chandler with 54.32% of the vote.

=== Attorney General ===
Democratic incumbent Attorney General Mike Bowers changed parties to run for re-election as a Republican. Bowers defeated Democratic State Representative Wesley Dunn 66%-34%.

=== Secretary of State ===
Democratic incumbent Max Cleland won re-election, defeating Keith Mahoney with 70.13% of the vote.

=== School Superintendent ===
Republican Linda Schrenko defeated Democratic incumbent Werner Rogers with 50.77% of the vote.

=== Insurance Commissioner ===
Republican chairman of the State Personnel Board John Oxendine defeated Tim Ryles with 50.98% of the vote.

=== Agriculture Commissioner ===
Democratic incumbent Tommy Irvin defeated Libertarian candidate Sharon Harris 77.39%-22.61%.

=== Labor Commissioner ===
Democratic incumbent David Poythress defeated Republican candidate Richard Robinson 53.88-46.12.

=== Public Service Commission ===
In PSC Seat 1, Republican David Baker defeated Democratic incumbent Earleen Sizemore, Libertarian Dick James and independent candidate Hoke Smith, winning 53.85% of the vote. In PSC Seat 2, Republican challenger David Baker defeated Democratic incumbent Bobby Rowan with 50.45% of the vote.

=== Georgia General Assembly ===
Members were elected to the 143rd Georgia General Assembly.
