= Goldie Taylor =

American author and opinion writer

- Born: 1968 (age 57–58); University City, Missouri, U.S.
- Education: Emory University (BA)
- Occupations: Journalist, author, television personality
- Military career
- Allegiance: United States
- Branch: United States Marine Corps
- Service years: 1986-1989
- Website: goldietaylor.com

Goldie Taylor (born 1968) is an American author and opinion writer based in Atlanta, Georgia. She is an editor-at-large of The Daily Beast.

== Early life ==
Taylor was born in University City, Missouri, and raised in East St. Louis, Illinois. Her father was murdered on November 5, 1973, when she was 5, leaving her mother Mary to raise her and her siblings alone. She attended public schools in the metro St. Louis area before moving to Atlanta and graduating from Cross Keys High School in 1986. After enlisting in the United States Marine Corps, Taylor trained in public affairs broadcasting at Fort Benjamin Harrison, Indiana. She received an honorable discharge on medical grounds. Taylor then attended Emory University in Atlanta, where she studied political science and international affairs, graduating in 1994.

== Career ==
=== Political ===
Taylor worked on a number of political campaigns in the 1990s, including Guy Millner's unsuccessful 1996 U.S. Senate campaign against Max Cleland.

In later years Taylor worked on Kasim Reed's 2009 successful campaign for Mayor of Atlantaas his campaign's communications director. Throughout the 1990s and 2000s, Taylor worked for candidates on both sides of the aisle, including as a fundraiser for President Barack Obama's 2008 campaign. Her first campaign was in 1993, where she worked as Deputy Press Secretary for Fulton County Commission Chair Michael Lomax's mayoral campaign.

Taylor worked as a political contributor for MSNBC and writer for MSNBC.com for four years where she focused on social justice issues. She left MSNBC in September 2014, after MSNBC decided not to renew her contract. In 2014, she began producing her first feature-length documentary, "The Other Side of Grace", which charts the rise and decline of East St. Louis.

=== Writing ===
While a student at Emory University, Taylor began writing for the Emory Wheel as well as for The Atlanta Journal-Constitution as a part-time staff writer. She self-published her first novel, In My Father's House, with WheatMark Press in 2005. Her second novel, The January Girl, was first published by Madison Park Press in 2007 and later re-released by Grand Central Publishing, a division of Hachette. A third novel, Paper Gods, was published by St. Martin's Press in 2018.

She has written for The Atlanta Journal-Constitution, Creative Loafing, Marie Claire, TheGrio, CNN.com, Americablog, MSNBC.com, and EbonyJet.com. Her 2008 op-ed column regarding then Republican vice presidential nominee and Alaska Governor Sarah Palin, "A Woman's Worth", published by EbonyJet.com, was described in February 2013 as the most visited webpage in the site's history. She is also the author of "Show Me Your Papers!", a special-contributor opinion aired on MSNBC's The Rachel Maddow Show that addressed Birtherism through the prism of a family story about her great-great-grandfather, Major Blackard.

=== Television ===
Taylor is a frequent contributor to MSNBC, CNN and HLN on social, political and faith issues. In the wake of the Penn State sex abuse scandal, Taylor revealed during a November 2011 appearance on "CNN Newsroom" with Don Lemon her own experience being sexually abused. In a post on her blog about her decision to come forward, Taylor named her abuser. Taylor also disclosed details on Twitter about the abuse which took place while she was in high school. In March 2012, Taylor appeared on The Lawrence O’Donnell Show wearing a hooded sweatshirt in solidarity with slain Florida teenager Trayvon Martin. She was the first cable news pundit to do so, being an early vocal proponent of a deeper investigation.

=== Corporate ===
Taylor has worked for the Sara Lee Corporation as director of global communications and public affairs.

Taylor has served as executive consultant to NBC News and CNN Worldwide. In 2009, while serving as a consulting producer to CNN, Taylor re-opened an investigation into the Atlanta Child Murders and convicted serial killer Wayne Williams. She was also an executive consultant to CNN's "Black in America", leading the audience tune-in strategy. "Black In America" remains one of the highest rated documentaries in CNN's history. Taylor states that she created and launched Procter & Gamble's "My Black Is Beautiful", the largest marketing effort targeting African-American women in the company's history.

She has previously been an external affairs executive for several Fortune 500 companies, as well as two of the world's largest public relations agencies, the GCI Group San Francisco and Edelman Atlanta Public Relations. Taylor is currently the CEO of Goldie Taylor Brand Communications, an Atlanta-based multi-cultural advertising and public relations agency. She is also the managing editor and host of "The Goldie Taylor Project", an opinion blog devoted to contemporary political, social, and faith issues confronting America.

== Personal life ==
Taylor currently lives in Brooklyn, New York.
