= 1998 Georgia gubernatorial election =

- November 3, 1998
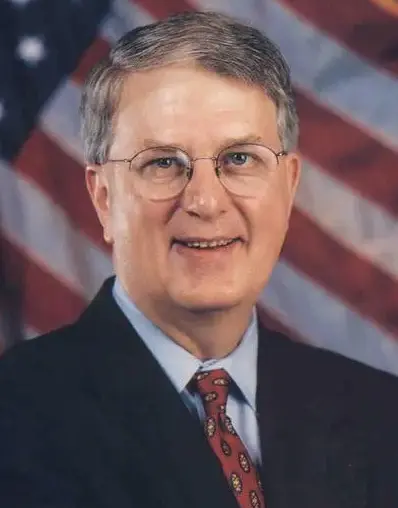

Nominee	Roy Barnes	Guy Millner
Party	Democratic	Republican
Popular vote	941,076	790,201
Percentage	52.49%	44.08%
- County results Barnes: 40–50% 50–60% 60–70% 70–80% 80–90% Millner: 40–50% 50–60% 60–70%
Governor before election
Zell Miller
Democratic
Elected Governor
Roy Barnes
Democratic

The 1998 Georgia gubernatorial election was held on November 3, 1998. Democratic incumbent Zell Miller was unable to seek re-election due to term limits. In the open race to succeed him, Democratic state representative Roy Barnes defeated Republican businessman Guy Millner.

State representative Roy Barnes won the Democratic Party's nomination after a close and highly contested primary election, while businessman Guy Millner, who had run for governor and the United States Senate in the previous four years, won the nomination of the Republican Party.

In the general election, Barnes was able to defeat Millner by a margin of victory larger than Governor Miller's victory over Millner four years prior, which was in part due to the unpopularity and controversy of Mitch Skandalakis, the Republican nominee for Lieutenant Governor of Georgia. This was the last time a Democrat was elected Governor of Georgia until 2026.

== Democratic primary ==
=== Candidates ===
- Roy Barnes, state representative from Marietta
- Lewis A. Massey, Georgia secretary of state
- David Poythress, Georgia commissioner of labor
- Steve Langford, state senator from LaGrange
- Morris James
- Carlton Myers, Pine Mountain veterinarian and 1974 candidate for Senate

=== Results ===
Primary results by county: Barnes: Barnes—30–40%; Barnes—40–50%; Barnes—50–60%; Barnes—>60%; Massey: Massey—30–40%; Massey—40–50%; Massey—50–60%; Massey—>60%; Lanford: Langford—>30%

Democratic primary results
Party	Candidate	Votes	%
Democratic	Roy Barnes	239,517	49.20
Democratic	Lewis A. Massey	135,920	27.92
Democratic	David Poythress	65,860	13.53
Democratic	Steve Langford	31,543	6.48
Democratic	Morris James	9,148	1.88
Democratic	Carlton Myers	4,853	1.00
Total votes		486,841	100.00

=== Runoff results ===
Runoff results by county: Barnes: Barnes—60%–70%; Barnes—70%–80%; Barnes—80%–90%; Barnes—>90%

Democratic primary runoff results
Party	Candidate	Votes	%
Democratic	Roy Barnes	221,651	82.90
Democratic	Lewis A. Massey	45,735	17.10
Total votes		267,386	100.00

== Republican primary ==
=== Candidates ===
- Mike Bowers, Georgia attorney general
- Guy Millner, businessman, 1996 nominee for U.S. Senate, and 1994 nominee for governor
- Nancy Schaefer, 1994 nominee for lieutenant governor
- Bruce Hatfield

=== Campaign ===
Bowers's campaign was derailed when he admitted to a fifteen-year extramarital affair with Anne Davis, his secretary and a former Playboy Club waitress. Davis publicly stated that the romance had been active as recently as April 1997, six weeks prior to Bowers' June 5 announcement.

=== Results ===
Primary results by county: Millner: Millner—40–50%; Millner—50–60%; Millner—60–70%; Millner—>70%; Bowers: Bowers—40–50%; Bowers—>50%; Tie: Tie between Bowers and Millner–40–50%; Tie between Bowers, Millner, and Hatfield–33%

Millner narrowly avoided a run-off by just 1,573 votes. However, Bowers conceded before a recount finalized the result, admitting that all indications pointed to a victory for Millner.

Republican primary results
Party	Candidate	Votes	%
Republican	Guy Millner	210,845	50.38
Republican	Mike Bowers	167,074	39.92
Republican	Nancy Schaefer	32,315	7.72
Republican	Bruce Hatfield	8,308	1.98
Total votes		418,542	100.00

== General election ==
=== Candidates ===
- Roy Barnes, state representative from Marietta (Democratic)
- Jack Cashin (Libertarian)
- Guy Millner, businessman, 1996 nominee for U.S. Senate, and 1994 nominee for governor (Republican)

=== Polling ===
Poll source	Date(s)	Sample size (Note: Key: A – all adults RV – registered voters LV – likely voters V – unclear)	Margin of error	Roy Barnes (D)	Guy Millner (R)	Other / undecided (Note: Calculated by taking the difference of 100% and all other candidates combined.)
Harris Insights & Analytics	October 30, 1998	1,408	—	43%	50%	7%
Mason-Dixon Polling & Strategy	October 26–28, 1998	809 (LV)	± 3.5%	43%	46%	11%
Marketing Workshop	October 26, 1998	709	—	40%	45%	15%
Harris Insights & Analytics	October 20, 1998	1,174	—	42%	47%	11%
Mason-Dixon Polling & Strategy	October 5–6, 1998	807 (LV)	± 3.5%	42%	45%	13%
Marketing Workshop (Note: Poll sponsored by The Atlanta Journal-Constitution and WSB-TV2)	September 26–29, 1998	690 (RV)	± 3.7%	41%	47%	12%
Mason-Dixon Polling & Strategy	September 5–8, 1998	829 (LV)	± 3.5%	41%	42%	17%
Mason-Dixon Polling & Strategy	July 13–15, 1998	828 (LV)	± 3.5%	39%	45%	16%
Mason-Dixon Polling & Strategy	June 20–23, 1998	807 (V)	± 3.5%	33%	42%	25%

=== Results ===
1998 Georgia gubernatorial election
Party	Candidate	Votes	%	±%
Democratic	Roy Barnes	941,076	52.49%	+1.44%
Republican	Guy Millner	790,201	44.08%	−4.87%
Libertarian	Jack Cashin	61,531	3.43%	
Majority		150,875	8.42%	+6.31%
Turnout		1,792,808		
Democratic hold		Swing		

== Notes ==
Partisan clients
