= 1996 United States presidential election in Georgia =

- November 5, 1996
- Turnout: 49.6% ▲2.6 pp

Nominee	Bob Dole	Bill Clinton	Ross Perot
Party	Republican	Democratic	Reform
Home state	Kansas	Arkansas	Texas
Running mate	Jack Kemp	Al Gore	Pat Choate
Electoral vote	13	0	0
Popular vote	1,080,843	1,053,849	146,337
Percentage	47.01%	45.84%	6.37%
County results
Dole
40–50%
50–60%
60–70%
Clinton
40–50%
50–60%
60–70%
80–90%
President before election
Bill Clinton
Democratic
Elected President
Bill Clinton
Democratic

The 1996 United States presidential election in Georgia took place on November 5, 1996, as part of the 1996 United States presidential election. Voters chose 13 representatives, or electors, to the Electoral College, who voted for president and vice president.

Georgia was won by Senator Bob Dole (R-KS) by a narrow 1.2% margin. Georgia was the third-closest contest that year, with only Kentucky and Nevada being closer, as well as Dole's closest race. Dole's victory was possible due to the declining support for Democrats in Georgia and many other Southeastern States, though the Democratic Party in Georgia would remain dominant at the state level until the early 2000s. Billionaire businessman Ross Perot (Ref-TX), who had unsuccessfully run for president as an independent in the previous election, won 6.4% of the popular vote in Georgia, a significant total for a third-party candidate. Until the 2020 election (which Democrats won), this was the last time that a Democratic presidential nominee finished within 2% of the Republican candidate; this was also the last time any third-party candidate had won more than 5% of the popular vote in Georgia.

During the concurrent U.S. Senate election in Georgia, Secretary of State of Georgia Max Cleland (D) narrowly defeated businessman Guy Millner (R) 48.87% to 47.54%. In addition, incumbent U.S. Representatives Sanford Bishop (D-GA-2), Saxby Chambliss (R-GA-8), and Charlie Norwood (R-GA-10) all received strong challenges that year during the House elections but were nonetheless re-elected.

Georgia weighed in for this election as 10 points more Republican than the national average. As of the 2024 presidential election, this is the last election in which Wheeler, Butts, Heard, Polk, Long, Hart, Chattooga, Elbert, Treutlen, Decatur, Screven, Wilkes, Greene, Dodge, Clinch, Crawford, Lanier, Miller, Brooks, Taylor, Turner, Wilcox, Cook, Marion, Jenkins, Atkinson, Berrien, Lamar, Crisp, Emanuel, Pulaski, Schley, Grady, Irwin, Johnson, Seminole, Putnam, Montgomery, Jasper, and Ben Hill counties voted for a Democratic presidential candidate.

Georgia was one of three states won by Clinton in 1992 that Dole was able to flip, the others being Montana and Colorado.

This is the last election in which Georgia would vote differently from Arizona, as both had Republican winning streaks from 2000 to 2016 before flipping simultaneously in 2020 and 2024.

Among white voters, 61% supported Dole, 29% supported Clinton, and 8% supported Perot. Georgia was Doles fourth strongest performance among whites in the entire nation, the top three were Mississippi (Dole+43), South Carolina (Dole+37), and Alabama (Dole+33).

== Results ==
1996 United States presidential election in Georgia
Party	Candidate	Running mate	Votes	Percentage	Electoral votes
Republican	Bob Dole	Jack Kemp	1,080,843	47.01%	13
Democratic	Bill Clinton (incumbent)	Al Gore (incumbent)	1,053,849	45.84%	0
Reform	Ross Perot	Pat Choate	146,337	6.37%	0
Libertarian	Harry Browne	Jo Jorgensen	17,870	0.78%	0
Taxpayers	Howard Phillips (write-in)	Herbert Titus	145 (Note: These write-in votes were not separated by county but given only as a state-wide total.)	0.01%	0
Independent	Charles E. Collins (write-in)	Rosemary Giumarra	15	0.00%	0
Socialist Workers	James Harris (write-in)	Laura Garza	12	0.00%	0
Totals			2,299,071	100.00%	13
Voter turnout (Voting age)					42%

=== Results by county ===
County	Bob Dole Republican		Bill Clinton Democratic		Ross Perot Reform		Harry E. Browne Libertarian		Margin		Total votes cast
County	#	%	#	%	#	%	#	%	#	%	Total votes cast
Appling	2,572	50.44%	2,070	40.60%	446	8.75%	11	0.22%	502	9.84%	5,099
Atkinson	784	42.94%	823	45.07%	215	11.77%	4	0.22%	-39	-2.13%	1,826
Bacon	1,580	47.07%	1,360	40.51%	402	11.97%	15	0.45%	220	6.56%	3,357
Baker	408	27.66%	955	64.75%	105	7.12%	7	0.47%	-547	-37.09%	1,475
Baldwin	4,570	40.79%	5,740	51.23%	849	7.58%	46	0.41%	-1,170	-10.44%	11,205
Banks	1,925	47.23%	1,536	37.68%	595	14.60%	20	0.49%	389	9.55%	4,076
Barrow	5,342	51.65%	3,928	37.98%	942	9.11%	130	1.26%	1,414	13.67%	10,342
Bartow	9,250	51.32%	6,853	38.02%	1,770	9.82%	152	0.84%	2,397	13.30%	18,025
Ben Hill	1,516	37.08%	2,198	53.77%	358	8.76%	16	0.39%	-682	-16.69%	4,088
Berrien	1,950	42.87%	2,066	45.42%	525	11.54%	8	0.18%	-116	-2.55%	4,549
Bibb	20,778	41.61%	26,727	53.53%	2,268	4.54%	159	0.32%	-5,949	-11.92%	49,932
Bleckley	1,632	49.33%	1,365	41.26%	300	9.07%	11	0.33%	267	8.07%	3,308
Brantley	1,738	47.83%	1,494	41.11%	386	10.62%	16	0.44%	244	6.72%	3,634
Brooks	1,738	42.87%	1,977	48.77%	314	7.75%	25	0.62%	-239	-5.90%	4,054
Bryan	3,577	57.06%	2,152	34.33%	513	8.18%	27	0.43%	1,425	22.73%	6,269
Bulloch	6,646	50.97%	5,396	41.38%	939	7.20%	58	0.44%	1,250	9.59%	13,039
Burke	2,590	37.47%	3,915	56.63%	389	5.63%	19	0.27%	-1,325	-19.16%	6,913
Butts	2,027	42.61%	2,271	47.74%	416	8.75%	43	0.90%	-244	-5.13%	4,757
Calhoun	541	28.96%	1,217	65.15%	106	5.67%	4	0.21%	-676	-36.19%	1,868
Camden	4,222	49.75%	3,644	42.94%	572	6.74%	48	0.57%	578	6.81%	8,486
Candler	1,131	45.22%	1,097	43.86%	264	10.56%	9	0.36%	34	1.36%	2,501
Carroll	11,157	51.25%	8,438	38.76%	2,002	9.20%	172	0.79%	2,719	12.49%	21,769
Catoosa	8,237	55.89%	5,185	35.18%	1,257	8.53%	60	0.41%	3,052	20.71%	14,739
Charlton	1,374	45.33%	1,368	45.13%	280	9.24%	9	0.30%	6	0.20%	3,031
Chatham	31,987	44.88%	35,781	50.20%	3,028	4.25%	481	0.67%	-3,794	-5.32%	71,277
Chattahoochee	398	36.78%	565	52.22%	115	10.63%	4	0.37%	-167	-15.44%	1,082
Chattooga	2,513	39.72%	3,003	47.47%	796	12.58%	14	0.22%	-490	-7.75%	6,326
Cherokee	24,527	63.41%	10,802	27.93%	2,872	7.43%	476	1.23%	13,725	35.48%	38,677
Clarke	10,504	38.41%	15,206	55.61%	1,201	4.39%	435	1.59%	-4,702	-17.20%	27,346
Clay	293	25.63%	787	68.85%	62	5.42%	1	0.09%	-494	-43.22%	1,143
Clayton	20,625	37.34%	30,687	55.55%	3,494	6.32%	436	0.79%	-10,062	-18.21%	55,242
Clinch	789	40.42%	973	49.85%	182	9.32%	8	0.41%	-184	-9.43%	1,952
Cobb	114,188	56.93%	73,750	36.77%	10,438	5.20%	2,197	1.10%	40,438	20.16%	200,573
Coffee	3,934	48.72%	3,407	42.19%	711	8.80%	23	0.28%	527	6.53%	8,075
Colquitt	4,847	48.51%	4,135	41.38%	977	9.78%	33	0.33%	712	7.13%	9,992
Columbia	21,291	67.18%	8,601	27.14%	1,709	5.39%	92	0.29%	12,690	40.04%	31,693
Cook	1,354	39.74%	1,780	52.25%	267	7.84%	6	0.18%	-426	-12.51%	3,407
Coweta	13,058	56.85%	7,794	33.93%	1,949	8.48%	169	0.74%	5,264	22.92%	22,970
Crawford	1,290	41.57%	1,534	49.44%	270	8.70%	9	0.29%	-244	-7.87%	3,103
Crisp	2,321	43.83%	2,504	47.28%	445	8.40%	26	0.49%	-183	-3.45%	5,296
Dade	2,295	49.16%	1,737	37.21%	618	13.24%	18	0.39%	558	11.95%	4,668
Dawson	2,343	54.41%	1,434	33.30%	473	10.98%	56	1.30%	909	21.11%	4,306
Decatur	3,035	44.65%	3,245	47.74%	497	7.31%	20	0.29%	-210	-3.09%	6,797
DeKalb	60,255	29.08%	137,903	66.55%	6,742	3.25%	2,329	1.12%	-77,648	-37.47%	207,229
Dodge	2,478	42.86%	2,696	46.64%	587	10.15%	20	0.35%	-218	-3.78%	5,781
Dooly	990	31.33%	1,951	61.74%	207	6.55%	12	0.38%	-961	-30.41%	3,160
Dougherty	11,144	39.98%	15,600	55.97%	1,072	3.85%	56	0.20%	-4,456	-15.99%	27,872
Douglas	14,495	54.75%	9,631	36.37%	2,109	7.97%	242	0.91%	4,864	18.38%	26,477
Early	1,374	41.98%	1,648	50.35%	246	7.52%	5	0.15%	-274	-8.37%	3,273
Echols	335	45.09%	308	41.45%	97	13.06%	3	0.40%	27	3.64%	743
Effingham	5,022	56.76%	3,031	34.26%	769	8.69%	26	0.29%	1,991	22.50%	8,848
Elbert	2,393	40.86%	2,900	49.51%	552	9.42%	12	0.20%	-507	-8.65%	5,857
Emanuel	2,451	41.73%	2,947	50.18%	450	7.66%	25	0.43%	-496	-8.45%	5,873
Evans	1,206	47.52%	1,117	44.01%	204	8.04%	11	0.43%	89	3.51%	2,538
Fannin	3,373	48.67%	2,741	39.55%	782	11.28%	34	0.49%	632	9.12%	6,930
Fayette	21,005	63.25%	9,875	29.74%	2,016	6.07%	313	0.94%	11,130	33.51%	33,209
Floyd	12,426	48.96%	10,464	41.23%	2,345	9.24%	143	0.56%	1,962	7.73%	25,378
Forsyth	15,013	64.83%	5,957	25.72%	1,889	8.16%	300	1.30%	9,056	39.11%	23,159
Franklin	2,364	43.79%	2,338	43.30%	665	12.32%	32	0.59%	26	0.49%	5,399
Fulton	89,809	36.93%	143,306	58.93%	7,720	3.17%	2,333	0.96%	-53,497	-22.00%	243,168
Gilmer	3,121	49.06%	2,464	38.74%	725	11.40%	51	0.80%	657	10.32%	6,361
Glascock	532	52.78%	348	34.52%	128	12.70%	0	0.00%	184	18.26%	1,008
Glynn	12,305	56.96%	8,058	37.30%	1,137	5.26%	102	0.47%	4,247	19.66%	21,602
Gordon	5,232	48.35%	4,239	39.18%	1,284	11.87%	65	0.60%	993	9.17%	10,820
Grady	2,674	43.23%	2,862	46.27%	633	10.23%	16	0.26%	-188	-3.04%	6,185
Greene	1,702	42.39%	2,115	52.68%	173	4.31%	25	0.62%	-413	-10.29%	4,015
Gwinnett	96,610	59.29%	53,819	33.03%	10,236	6.28%	2,280	1.40%	42,791	26.26%	162,945
Habersham	4,730	51.93%	3,170	34.80%	1,149	12.62%	59	0.65%	1,560	17.13%	9,108
Hall	19,280	59.84%	10,362	32.16%	2,321	7.20%	256	0.79%	8,918	27.68%	32,219
Hancock	438	16.55%	2,135	80.69%	71	2.68%	2	0.08%	-1,697	-64.14%	2,646
Haralson	3,260	46.89%	2,850	40.99%	808	11.62%	35	0.50%	410	5.90%	6,953
Harris	3,829	53.70%	2,779	38.97%	489	6.86%	34	0.48%	1,050	14.73%	7,131
Hart	2,884	40.22%	3,486	48.61%	767	10.70%	34	0.47%	-602	-8.39%	7,171
Heard	1,170	41.14%	1,248	43.88%	406	14.28%	20	0.70%	-78	-2.74%	2,844
Henry	16,968	58.36%	9,498	32.67%	2,320	7.98%	288	0.99%	7,470	25.69%	29,074
Houston	17,050	52.18%	12,760	39.05%	2,730	8.35%	138	0.42%	4,290	13.13%	32,678
Irwin	1,085	42.72%	1,225	48.23%	224	8.82%	6	0.24%	-140	-5.51%	2,540
Jackson	4,782	50.38%	3,746	39.46%	899	9.47%	65	0.68%	1,036	10.92%	9,492
Jasper	1,423	44.00%	1,553	48.02%	243	7.51%	15	0.46%	-130	-4.02%	3,234
Jeff Davis	1,796	47.08%	1,576	41.31%	428	11.22%	15	0.39%	220	5.77%	3,815
Jefferson	2,077	35.86%	3,404	58.77%	298	5.15%	13	0.22%	-1,327	-22.91%	5,792
Jenkins	955	38.77%	1,336	54.24%	166	6.74%	6	0.24%	-381	-15.47%	2,463
Johnson	815	36.14%	1,194	52.95%	242	10.73%	4	0.18%	-379	-16.81%	2,255
Jones	3,272	46.80%	3,195	45.70%	497	7.11%	28	0.40%	77	1.10%	6,992
Lamar	1,988	43.75%	2,125	46.76%	409	9.00%	22	0.48%	-137	-3.01%	4,544
Lanier	519	34.55%	818	54.46%	160	10.65%	5	0.33%	-299	-19.91%	1,502
Laurens	6,118	47.79%	5,792	45.24%	818	6.39%	75	0.59%	326	2.55%	12,803
Lee	3,983	61.15%	2,005	30.78%	506	7.77%	19	0.29%	1,978	30.37%	6,513
Liberty	3,042	37.42%	4,462	54.89%	580	7.13%	45	0.55%	-1,420	-17.47%	8,129
Lincoln	1,391	47.33%	1,334	45.39%	208	7.08%	6	0.20%	57	1.94%	2,939
Long	791	40.11%	936	47.46%	236	11.97%	9	0.46%	-145	-7.35%	1,972
Lowndes	10,578	48.92%	9,470	43.79%	1,518	7.02%	58	0.27%	1,108	5.13%	21,624
Lumpkin	2,576	49.86%	1,949	37.73%	588	11.38%	53	1.03%	627	12.13%	5,166
McDuffie	3,254	50.96%	2,725	42.68%	395	6.19%	11	0.17%	529	8.28%	6,385
McIntosh	1,219	35.35%	1,927	55.89%	293	8.50%	9	0.26%	-708	-20.54%	3,448
Macon	1,006	26.54%	2,618	69.06%	159	4.19%	8	0.21%	-1,612	-42.52%	3,791
Madison	3,992	53.40%	2,571	34.39%	868	11.61%	45	0.60%	1,421	19.01%	7,476
Marion	678	37.23%	977	53.65%	159	8.73%	7	0.38%	-299	-16.42%	1,821
Meriwether	2,259	36.13%	3,492	55.85%	480	7.68%	22	0.35%	-1,233	-19.72%	6,253
Miller	847	42.43%	909	45.54%	235	11.77%	5	0.25%	-62	-3.11%	1,996
Mitchell	2,033	36.39%	3,165	56.66%	372	6.66%	16	0.29%	-1,132	-20.27%	5,586
Monroe	3,054	48.19%	2,768	43.67%	488	7.70%	28	0.44%	286	4.52%	6,338
Montgomery	1,163	43.31%	1,233	45.92%	284	10.58%	5	0.19%	-70	-2.61%	2,685
Morgan	2,118	45.92%	2,111	45.77%	364	7.89%	19	0.41%	7	0.15%	4,612
Murray	3,289	46.17%	2,861	40.16%	938	13.17%	36	0.51%	428	6.01%	7,124
Muscogee	19,360	41.86%	24,867	53.77%	1,891	4.09%	130	0.28%	-5,507	-11.91%	46,248
Newton	7,274	47.10%	6,759	43.77%	1,258	8.15%	152	0.98%	515	3.33%	15,443
Oconee	5,116	58.05%	2,992	33.95%	615	6.98%	90	1.02%	2,124	24.10%	8,813
Oglethorpe	1,826	48.03%	1,570	41.29%	369	9.71%	37	0.97%	256	6.74%	3,802
Paulding	10,152	57.57%	5,699	32.32%	1,603	9.09%	179	1.02%	4,453	25.25%	17,633
Peach	2,676	39.63%	3,582	53.05%	471	6.98%	23	0.34%	-906	-13.42%	6,752
Pickens	3,041	46.31%	2,693	41.01%	783	11.93%	49	0.75%	348	5.30%	6,566
Pierce	2,319	56.73%	1,420	34.74%	333	8.15%	16	0.39%	899	21.99%	4,088
Pike	2,054	52.52%	1,474	37.69%	357	9.13%	26	0.66%	580	14.83%	3,911
Polk	4,130	43.25%	4,298	45.01%	1,076	11.27%	46	0.48%	-168	-1.76%	9,550
Pulaski	1,196	39.47%	1,554	51.29%	268	8.84%	12	0.40%	-358	-11.82%	3,030
Putnam	2,306	44.81%	2,340	45.47%	474	9.21%	26	0.51%	-34	-0.66%	5,146
Quitman	224	28.11%	514	64.49%	59	7.40%	0	0.00%	-290	-36.38%	797
Rabun	2,213	46.42%	1,943	40.76%	585	12.27%	26	0.55%	270	5.66%	4,767
Randolph	816	34.24%	1,438	60.34%	126	5.29%	3	0.13%	-622	-26.10%	2,383
Richmond	23,670	41.62%	30,738	54.05%	2,310	4.06%	151	0.27%	-7,068	-12.43%	56,869
Rockdale	13,006	57.31%	7,656	33.73%	1,750	7.71%	284	1.25%	5,350	23.58%	22,696
Schley	470	40.17%	576	49.23%	123	10.51%	1	0.09%	-106	-9.06%	1,170
Screven	1,862	44.13%	2,087	49.47%	263	6.23%	7	0.17%	-225	-5.34%	4,219
Seminole	1,003	39.74%	1,265	50.12%	250	9.90%	6	0.24%	-262	-10.38%	2,524
Spalding	7,376	50.74%	6,017	41.39%	1,059	7.29%	84	0.58%	1,359	9.35%	14,536
Stephens	3,890	48.77%	3,072	38.51%	979	12.27%	36	0.45%	818	10.26%	7,977
Stewart	525	23.67%	1,537	69.30%	152	6.85%	4	0.18%	-1,012	-45.63%	2,218
Sumter	3,358	41.64%	4,239	52.57%	451	5.59%	16	0.20%	-881	-10.93%	8,064
Talbot	652	27.79%	1,579	67.31%	111	4.73%	4	0.17%	-927	-39.52%	2,346
Taliaferro	235	26.52%	615	69.41%	36	4.06%	0	0.00%	-380	-42.89%	886
Tattnall	2,518	46.23%	2,369	43.49%	541	9.93%	19	0.35%	149	2.74%	5,447
Taylor	1,002	37.77%	1,450	54.66%	195	7.35%	6	0.23%	-448	-16.89%	2,653
Telfair	1,143	34.30%	1,856	55.70%	322	9.66%	11	0.33%	-713	-21.40%	3,332
Terrell	1,111	40.33%	1,509	54.77%	129	4.68%	6	0.22%	-398	-14.44%	2,755
Thomas	5,649	49.04%	5,183	45.00%	667	5.79%	19	0.16%	466	4.04%	11,518
Tift	5,613	53.07%	4,198	39.69%	728	6.88%	38	0.36%	1,415	13.38%	10,577
Toombs	3,646	51.81%	2,763	39.26%	602	8.55%	26	0.37%	883	12.55%	7,037
Towns	2,030	48.58%	1,664	39.82%	459	10.98%	26	0.62%	366	8.76%	4,179
Treutlen	723	41.10%	912	51.85%	122	6.94%	2	0.11%	-189	-10.75%	1,759
Troup	8,716	55.06%	5,940	37.52%	1,090	6.89%	85	0.54%	2,776	17.54%	15,831
Turner	924	37.64%	1,272	51.81%	246	10.02%	13	0.53%	-348	-14.17%	2,455
Twiggs	958	30.80%	1,927	61.96%	210	6.75%	15	0.48%	-969	-31.16%	3,110
Union	2,685	48.70%	2,175	39.45%	622	11.28%	31	0.56%	510	9.25%	5,513
Upson	3,783	47.08%	3,491	43.45%	731	9.10%	30	0.37%	292	3.63%	8,035
Walker	8,817	50.10%	6,743	38.32%	1,969	11.19%	69	0.39%	2,074	11.78%	17,598
Walton	7,934	52.82%	5,618	37.40%	1,323	8.81%	145	0.97%	2,316	15.42%	15,020
Ware	4,746	49.55%	4,171	43.54%	636	6.64%	26	0.27%	575	6.01%	9,579
Warren	735	35.82%	1,230	59.94%	83	4.04%	4	0.19%	-495	-24.12%	2,052
Washington	2,348	33.94%	4,057	58.64%	488	7.05%	26	0.38%	-1,709	-24.70%	6,919
Wayne	3,709	52.05%	2,734	38.37%	665	9.33%	18	0.25%	975	13.68%	7,126
Webster	235	28.55%	529	64.28%	59	7.17%	0	0.00%	-294	-35.73%	823
Wheeler	460	33.90%	751	55.34%	141	10.39%	5	0.37%	-291	-21.44%	1,357
White	2,959	54.59%	1,864	34.39%	556	10.26%	41	0.76%	1,095	20.20%	5,420
Whitfield	12,368	56.69%	7,720	35.39%	1,637	7.50%	92	0.42%	4,648	21.30%	21,817
Wilcox	882	41.56%	1,067	50.28%	171	8.06%	2	0.09%	-185	-8.72%	2,122
Wilkes	1,417	39.51%	1,971	54.96%	184	5.13%	14	0.39%	-554	-15.45%	3,586
Wilkinson	1,332	34.08%	2,278	58.28%	287	7.34%	12	0.31%	-946	-24.20%	3,909
Worth	2,752	48.07%	2,300	40.17%	521	9.10%	152	2.66%	452	7.90%	5,725
Totals	1,080,843	47.01%	1,053,849	45.84%	146,337	6.37%	17,870	0.78%	26,994	1.17%	2,299,071

==== Counties that flipped from Democratic to Republican ====
- Bacon
- Bleckley
- Brantley
- Candler
- Franklin
- Haralson
- Jeff Davis
- Jones
- Laurens
- Lincoln
- Lumpkin
- Monroe
- Morgan
- Newton
- Pickens
- Ware (tied in 1992)
- Worth

==== Counties that flipped from Republican to Democratic ====
- Chatham
- Clinch

== Electors ==
Technically the voters of Georgia cast their ballots for electors: representatives to the Electoral College. Georgia was allocated 13 electors because it had 11 congressional districts and two senators. All candidates who appeared on the ballot or qualified to receive write-in votes had to submit a list of 13 electors, who pledged to vote for their candidate and his or her running mate. Whoever won the majority of votes in the state was awarded all 13 electoral votes. Their chosen electors would then vote for president and vice president. Although electors are pledged to their candidate and running mate, they are not obligated to vote for them. An elector who votes for someone other than his or her candidate is known as a faithless elector.

The electors of each state and the District of Columbia met in December 1996 to cast their votes for president and vice president. The Electoral College itself never meets as one body. Instead, the electors from each state and the District of Columbia met in their respective capitols.

The following were the members of the Electoral College from the state. All were pledged to and voted for Bob Dole and Jack Kemp.

1. Thomas J. Barnette
2. Dot Burns
3. Jeanne Ferst
4. Briggs A. Goggans
5. Camilla Johnson-Moore
6. Brenda R. (B.J.) Lopez
7. Mack Mattingly
8. Russell K. (Rusty) Paul
9. Oscar N. Persons
10. Alec Poitevint
11. John M. Stuckey, Jr.
12. Stan Wise
13. Ray Wooldridge
