= 1992 United States Senate election in Georgia =

- November 3, 1992 (first round); November 24, 1992 (runoff)
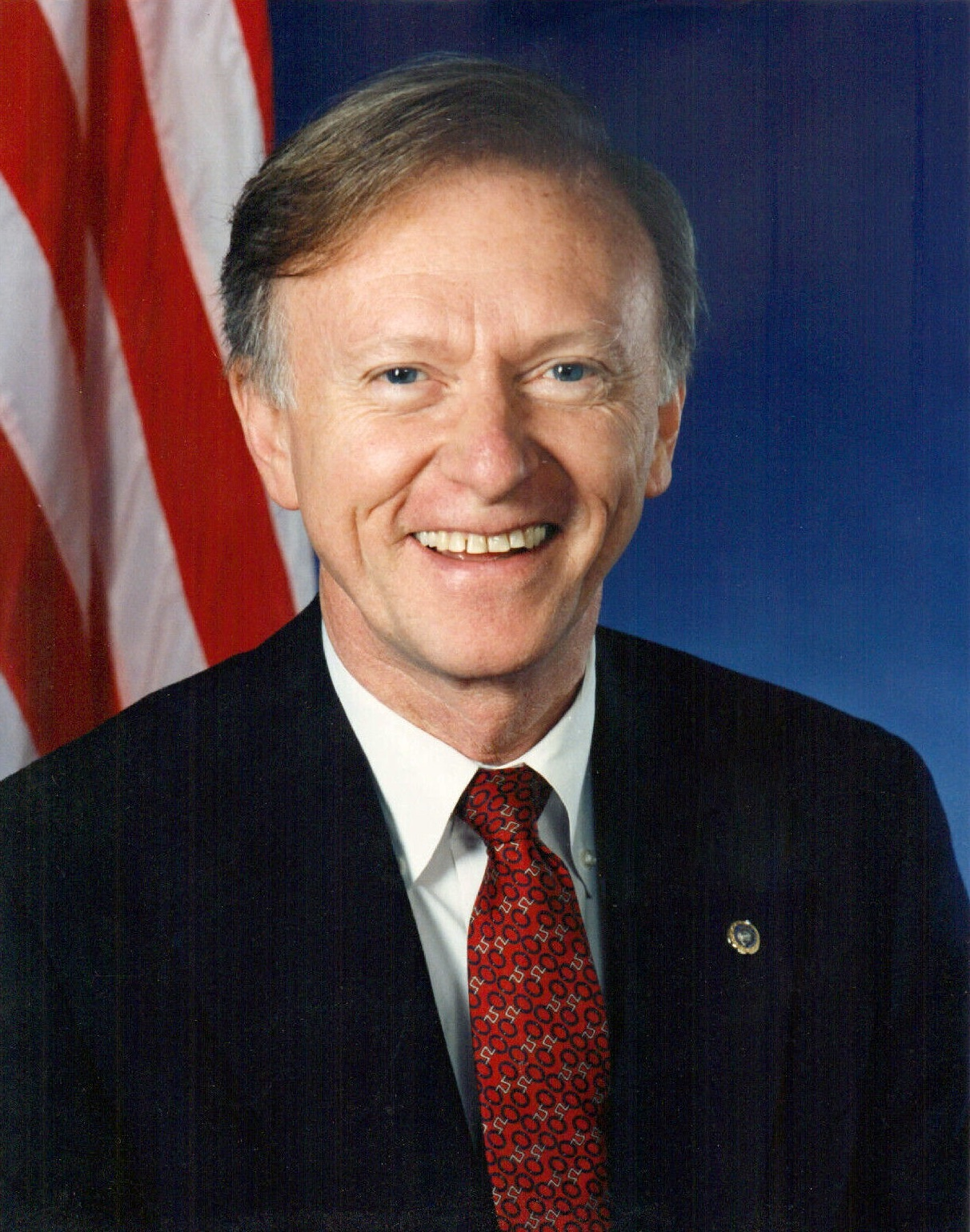

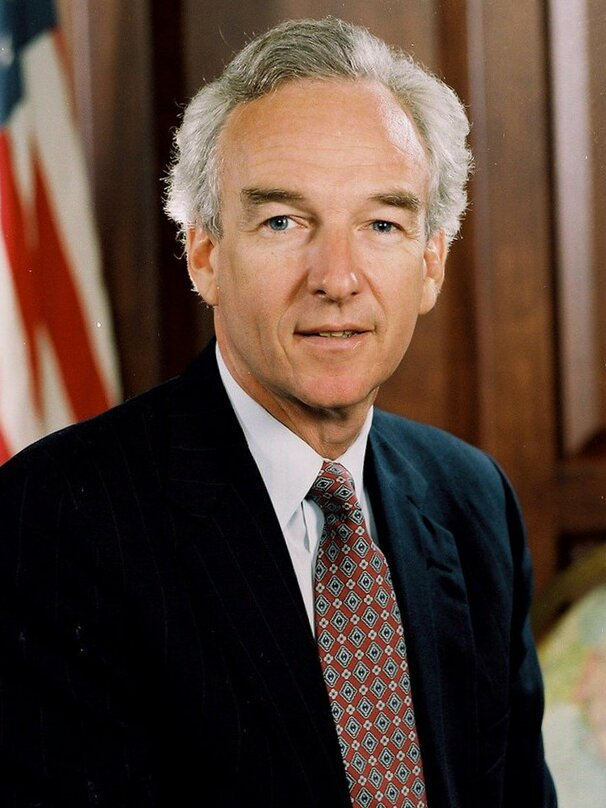
Nominee	Paul Coverdell	Wyche Fowler
Party	Republican	Democratic
First round	1,073,282; 47.67%	1,108,416; 49.23%
Runoff	635,118; 50.65%	618,774; 49.35%
- Coverdell: 40–50% 50–60% 60–70% 70–80% Fowler: 40–50% 50–60% 60–70% 70–80% 80–90%
U.S. senator before election
Wyche Fowler
Democratic
Elected U.S. Senator
Paul Coverdell
Republican

The 1992 United States Senate election in Georgia was held on November 3, 1992. In the general election, which occurred simultaneously with the presidential election, incumbent Democratic U.S. Senator Wyche Fowler received more votes, but did not achieve a simple majority. Under Georgia law, this demanded a runoff. Paul Coverdell, the former Director of the Peace Corps, edged out Fowler in the November 24 runoff by a narrow margin, flipping the seat to the Republicans. It was the first Senate runoff election to be held in Georgia since runoffs were first mandated in 1964. This was the third consecutive election for this Senate seat where the incumbent was defeated.

== Republican primary ==
The general primary was held July 21, 1992. A run-off between the top two Republican contenders was held on August 11, in which Paul Coverdell defeated Bob Barr.

=== Candidates ===
- Bob Barr, President of Southeastern Legal Foundation and former U.S. Attorney for the Northern District of Georgia
- Paul Coverdell, former Director of the Peace Corps and State Senator from Atlanta
- John Knox, former Mayor of Waycross
- Dean Parkison, retired drug store owner and perennial candidate
- Charlie Tanksley

=== Results ===
Results for the first round showed that since Paul Coverdell did not win a majority of the vote, a runoff was held between him and Barr. Coverdell subsequently won the runoff.

1992 Georgia U.S. Senate Republican primary election
Party	Candidate	Votes	%
Republican	Paul Coverdell	100,016	37.05%
Republican	Bob Barr	65,471	24.25%
Republican	John Knox	64,514	23.90%
Republican	Charlie Tanksley	32,590	12.07%
Republican	Dean Parkison	7,352	2.72%
Turnout		269,943	100.00%

1992 Georgia U.S. Senate Republican primary election runoff
Party	Candidate	Votes	%
Republican	Paul Coverdell	80,435	50.49%
Republican	Bob Barr	78,887	49.51%
Turnout		159,332	100.00%

== General election ==
=== Candidates ===
- Paul Coverdell, former State Senator from Atlanta (Republican)
- Wyche Fowler, incumbent U.S. Senator (Democratic)
- Jim Hudson (Libertarian)

=== Results ===
==== Initial ====
As no candidate reached a majority on November 3, a runoff election was held on November 24, which Coverdell won.

Georgia United States Senate election, 1992
Party	Candidate	Votes	%
Democratic	Wyche Fowler (incumbent)	1,108,416	49.23%
Republican	Paul Coverdell	1,073,282	47.67%
Libertarian	Jim Hudson	69,878	3.10%
	Write-In Votes	11	0.00%
Majority		35,134	1.56%
Turnout		2,251,587	

==== Run off ====
Georgia United States Senate election runoff, 1992
Party	Candidate	Votes	%
Republican	Paul Coverdell	635,118	50.65%
Democratic	Wyche Fowler (incumbent)	618,774	49.35%
Majority		16,344	1.30%
Turnout		1,253,892	
Republican gain from Democratic			

== Aftermath ==
The Georgia Legislature, then controlled by Democrats, changed the state's laws requiring a run-off election only if the winning candidate received less than 45% of the vote. In the 1996 Senate election, the winner, Democrat Max Cleland won with only 48.9% (1.4% ahead of Republican Guy Millner) thus avoiding a run-off. In 2005 after Republicans took control of the legislature, the run-off requirement was changed back to 50%.

The result of this election would later repeat in reverse in the 2020-2021 regular Senate election in Georgia, with Republican David Perdue winning the first round but falling less than one percent below the 50% threshold required to avoid a runoff, and then being defeated in the runoff by Democrat Jon Ossoff with a similar one point margin.

== See also ==
- 1992 United States Senate elections
