= 1990 Georgia Secretary of State election =

1990 Election of the Georgia (USA) Secretary of State

- November 6, 1990
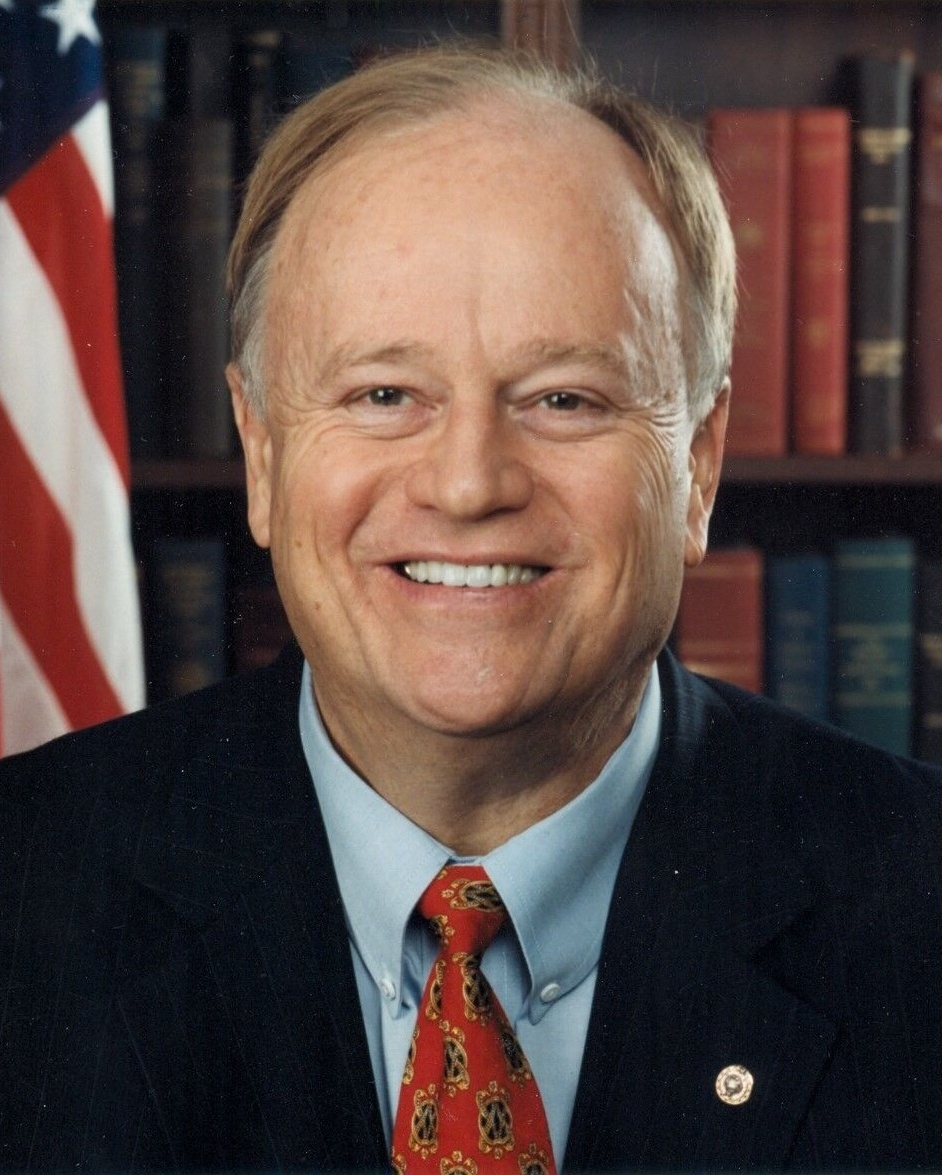
Nominee	Max Cleland
Party	Democratic
Popular vote	1,061,341
Percentage	100.00%
- County results Cleland: 100%
Secretary of State before election
Max Cleland
Democratic
Elected Secretary of State
Max Cleland
Democratic

The 1990 Georgia Secretary of State election was held on November 6, 1990, to elect the Georgia Secretary of State. Democratic incumbent Max Cleland won re-election to a third term unopposed. As of 2025, this is the last time a candidate ran unopposed in an election for Georgia Secretary of State.

== Democratic primary ==
=== Candidates ===
- Max Cleland, incumbent Georgia Secretary of State (1983–1996)

=== Campaign ===
Cleland was unopposed in the Democratic primary.

=== Results ===
Democratic primary results
Party	Candidate	Votes	%
Democratic	Max Cleland	784,064	100.00%
Total votes		784,064	100.00%

== General election ==
=== Candidates ===
- Max Cleland, incumbent Georgia Secretary of State (1983–1996) (Democratic)

=== Results ===
1990 Georgia Secretary of State election results
Party	Candidate	Votes	%
Democratic	Max Cleland	1,061,341	100.00%
Total votes		1,061,341	100.00%
Democratic hold			
