= Lewis A. Massey =

American politician

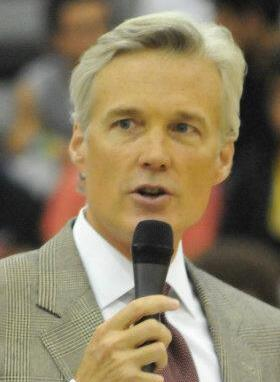
- Massey speaking at Gainesville High School, 2012

24th Secretary of State of Georgia
- In office January 5, 1996 – January 11, 1999
- Governor: Zell Miller
- Preceded by: Max Cleland
- Succeeded by: Cathy Cox

Personal details
- Born: July 20, 1962 (age 64) Gainesville, Georgia, U.S.
- Party: Democratic
- Spouse: Amy Reichard Massey
- Children: Chandler Massey; Cameryn Massey; Christian Massey
- Education: University of Georgia
- Profession: Politician

Lewis A. Massey (born July 20, 1962) is an American businessman and politician from the U.S. state of Georgia. A member of the Democratic Party, he served as Georgia Secretary of State, and was a candidate for governor of Georgia in 1998.

== Early life ==
Lewis Massey is the son of Abit Massey, was a lobbyist who became director of the Georgia Poultry Federation. He served as director of the state Commerce Department during the late 1950s. His mother, Kayanne Schoffner Massey, was chosen as Miss Georgia in 1959.

== Political career ==
Lewis A. Massey served as Secretary of State of Georgia, from January 1996 to January 1999. He was appointed to the position in January 1996 by then governor Zell Miller. Massey then was elected to the remainder of the unexpired term in November 1996.

Massey would later run for governor in 1998, losing to eventual winner Roy Barnes.

== Other ventures ==
Massey later served as president and CEO of SciTrek, and currently is a partner at Impact Public Affairs LLC, a government relations firm in Atlanta, Georgia.

== Personal life ==
Massey is married to Amy Reichard Massey from Kirkwood, MO, and they have three children. Their eldest son, Chandler Massey, is a Daytime Emmy Award winning actor, their daughter, Mary Cameryn, is a graduate of the University of Georgia, was employed at the Carter Center in Atlanta, and is now a lawyer with New Jersey Defenders, and their youngest son, Christian, is a graduate of University of Georgia and is currently works in the finance department for Comcast in Atlanta. Massey is a graduate of the University of Georgia and obtained an MBA in E-Commerce from Georgia State University. He is a member of the Gridiron Secret Society.

== Service ==
In 2018 Massey became a Visiting Practitioner with the University of Georgia's School of Public and International Affairs and the Grady School of Journalism and Mass Communications' Public Affairs Professional Certificate Program, volunteering his time to work with students interested in a career in politics. In addition, he and his family have supported the School of Public and International Affairs significantly and most recently had the Massey Family Reading Room, a place for students to read and reflect on politics and public policy, dedicated in Baldwin Hall, in gratitude for their support over the years.

Party political offices
Preceded by Max Cleland	Democratic nominee for Secretary of State of Georgia; 1996	Succeeded by Cathy Cox
Political offices
Preceded by Max Cleland	Secretary of State of Georgia; 1996–1999	Succeeded by Cathy Cox
