= 1996 United States Senate election in Georgia =

- November 5, 1996
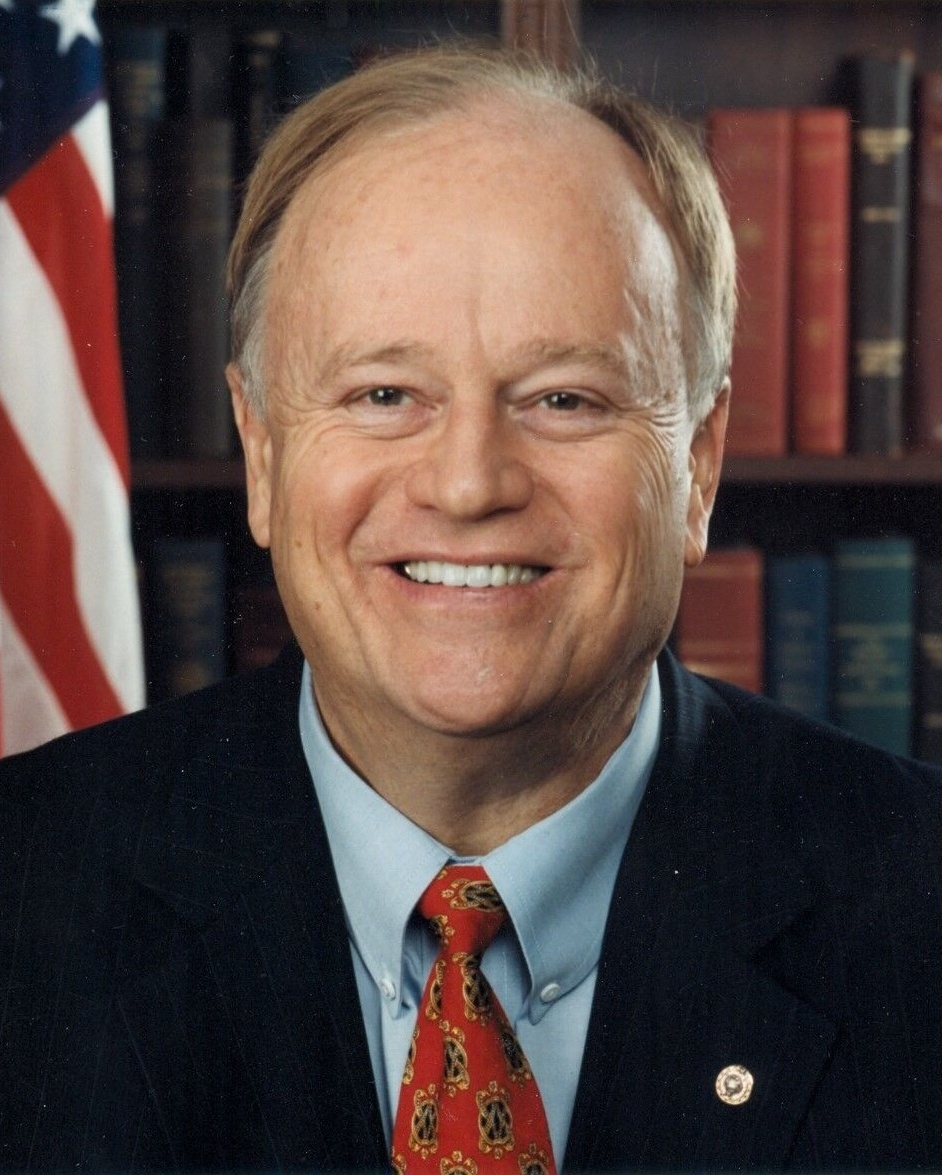

Nominee	Max Cleland	Guy Millner
Party	Democratic	Republican
Popular vote	1,103,993	1,073,969
Percentage	48.87%	47.54%
- County results Cleland: 40–50% 50–60% 60–70% 70–80% Millner: 40–50% 50–60% 60–70%
U.S. Senator before election
Sam Nunn
Democratic
Elected U.S. Senator
Max Cleland
Democratic

The 1996 United States Senate election in Georgia was held on November 5, 1996. Incumbent Democratic United States Senator Sam Nunn decided to retire instead of seeking a fifth term. Democratic Secretary of State Max Cleland won the open seat over Republican businessman Guy Millner.

Primary elections were held on July 9. Cleland won the Democratic primary unopposed. Millner, a multi-millionaire who had been the nominee for governor in 1994, faced a six-man field including State Senators Clint Day and Johnny Isakson. Millner and Isakson advanced to a run-off, which Millner won narrowly on August 6.

Cleland won narrowly with 48.9% of the vote, which was only possible because the Democratic legislature had repealed the run-off majority requirement after the 1992 Senate election, when Senator Wyche Fowler lost after leading the initial November election with a plurality. This was the closest race for this seat since the passage of the Seventeenth Amendment, which requires popular elections. It was the second-closest race of the 1996 United States Senate elections after the election in Louisiana.

A Democrat would not be elected to a full term in the United States Senate from Georgia again until 2020. (Note: In 2000, Zell Miller was elected to serve out the remaining four years of Paul Coverdell's term from Georgia's Class 3 Senate seat, the last time until 2020 that any Democrat would be elected to the Senate from Georgia.) This election was the first open-seat United States Senate election in Georgia since 1956 and the first open-seat United States Senate election in Georgia to this seat since 1932.

== Background ==
The Class 2 United States Senate seat had been reliably Democratic, with a member of that party holding it since 1852. Additionally, no Republican had ever held the seat since it was established in 1789. In fact, Senator Sam Nunn defeated Mike Hicks by an almost 60% margin in 1984 and faced no opponent in the 1990 election.

However, Georgia politics had become increasingly hospitable to the Republican Party. In 1992, Republican Paul Coverdell narrowly unseated Democrat Wyche Fowler to take Georgia's other Senate seat. On October 9, 1995, Nunn announced his retirement, leaving the seat open for the first time since 1972.

== Democratic primary ==
After the retirement of Sam Nunn, Democrats began seeking a successor for him. Eventually, Secretary of State of Georgia Max Cleland entered the race. Cleland was the only Democratic candidate to file for election, thus he became the nominee by default on July 9, 1996.

== Republican primary ==
=== Candidates ===
- Paul Broun, candidate for U.S. representative in 1990 and 1992
- Clint Day, state senator from Norcross
- Bruce Hatfield
- Johnny Isakson, state senator from Marietta and 1990 gubernatorial nominee
- Guy Millner, multi-millionaire businessman and 1994 gubernatorial nominee
- Dean Parkison, perennial candidate

=== Results ===
1996 Republican U.S. Senate primary
Party	Candidate	Votes	%
Republican	Guy Millner	187,177	41.91%
Republican	Johnny Isakson	155,141	34.73%
Republican	Clint Day	83,610	18.72%
Republican	Paul Broun	11,979	2.68%
Republican	Bruce Hatfield	6,117	1.37%
Republican	Dean Parkison	2,631	0.59%
Total votes		446,655	100.00%

=== Runoff ===
1996 Republican U.S. Senate runoff
Party	Candidate	Votes	%
Republican	Guy Millner	169,240	52.76%
Republican	Johnny Isakson	151,560	47.24%
Total votes		320,800	100.00%

== General election ==
=== Candidates ===
- Jack Cashin, owner of a restaurant chain and publisher of Dare magazine (Libertarian)
- Max Cleland, Secretary of State of Georgia (Democratic)
- Guy Millner, multi-millionaire businessman (Republican)
- Arlene Rubinstein (Independent)

=== Campaign ===
After the Republican primary, Guy Millner emerged as the nominee. Charles Bullock, a political scientist at the University of Georgia, noted that defeated rival Johnny Isakson was more likely to win the moderate vote due to his pro-choice views on abortion. Several polls earlier that year showed Cleland defeating both Millner and Isakson. In contrast to Isakson's opinion, Guy Millner was opposed to abortion except in the case of rape, incest, or to save the life of the mother. Zell Miller was appointed to the Class 3 seat in 2000 following Paul Coverdell's death and later elected in the special election; Johnny Isakson was later elected to that same seat after Miller retired in 2004. Opponent Max Cleland quickly labeled Millner as an extremist, saying that "I think people in this state want to elect a moderate ... not an extremist, not an ideologue, and not somebody hung up on some ideological agenda." In response, Millner began campaigning on other issues to capture more moderate voters.

=== Results ===
On Election Day, Democratic nominee Max Cleland narrowly won against Republican Guy Millner. It was one of the closest U.S. Senate elections in Georgia history. Cleland received 49% of the vote to Millner's 48%. Libertarian candidate Jack Cashin obtained 4%, while only eight people voted for Independent Arlene Rubinstein. Since the Democratic-controlled Georgia General Assembly changed the run-off rules after the 1992 Senate election to only require a runoff if the winning candidate received less than 45% of the vote, no runoff was required. Republicans, once they took control of the General Assembly in 2005, changed the law back to require a run-off if less than 50% of the vote was received.

General election results
Party	Candidate	Votes	%
Democratic	Max Cleland	1,103,993	48.87%
Republican	Guy Millner	1,073,969	47.54%
Libertarian	Jack Cashin	81,262	3.60%
Independent	Arlene Rubinstein	8	0.00%
Majority		30,024	1.33%
Turnout		2,259,232	

== Aftermath ==
Following the election, Max Cleland was sworn in as a United States senator on January 3, 1997. After one term, Max Cleland faced a tough re-election bid in 2002. However, this time he was defeated by Republican Saxby Chambliss. Cleland did not pursue public office after 2002, but campaigned for John Kerry in 2004 and was selected by President of the United States Barack Obama to serve on the American Battle Monuments Commission starting in 2009. The Republican candidate in 1996, Guy Millner, ran for governor of Georgia again in 1998, but lost to Democrat Roy Barnes. Millner did not seek public office again after his defeat in 1998.

== See also ==
- 1996 United States Senate elections
