= 1994 Georgia gubernatorial election =

- November 8, 1994
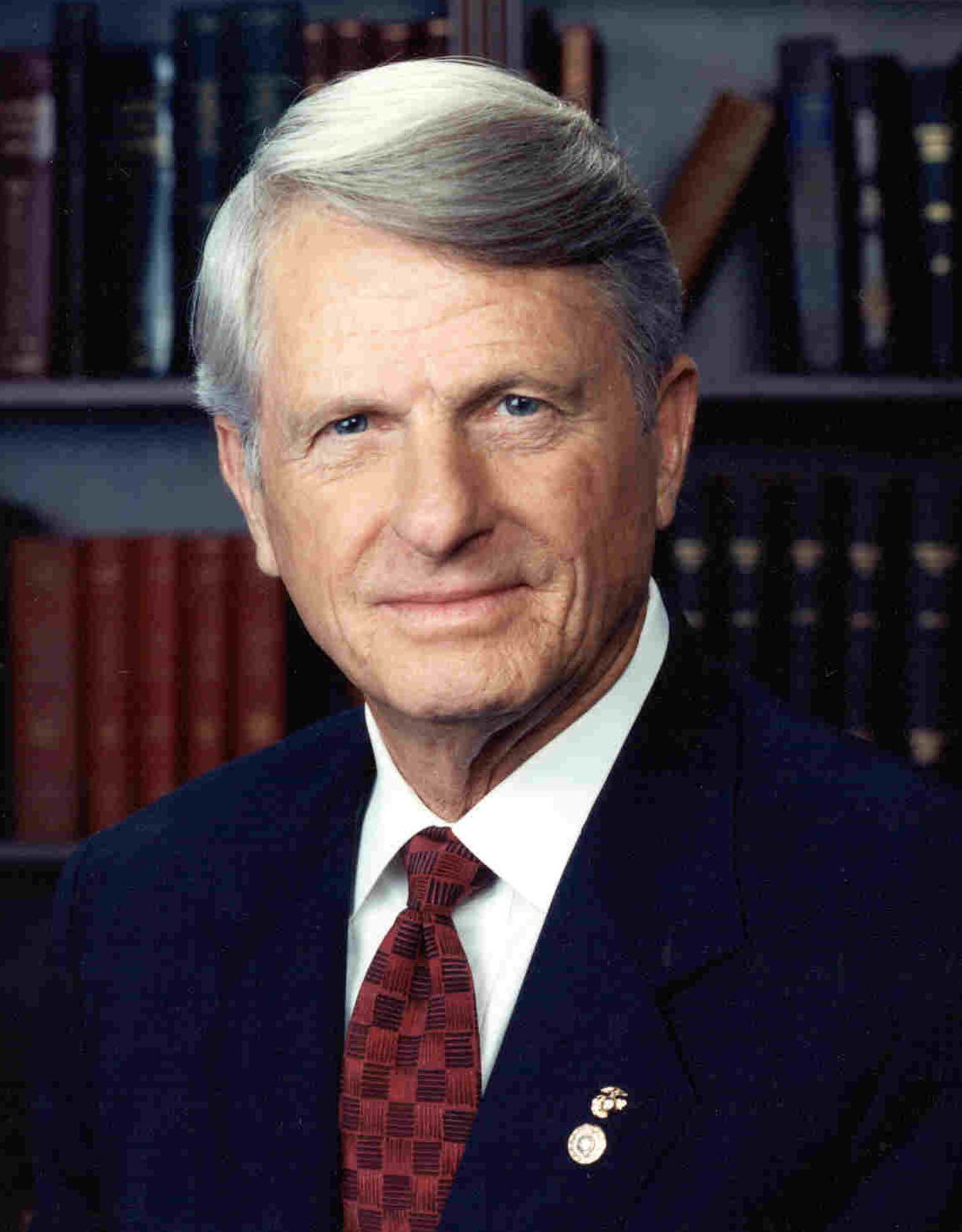

Nominee	Zell Miller	Guy Millner
Party	Democratic	Republican
Popular vote	788,926	756,371
Percentage	51.05%	48.95%
- County results Miller: 50–60% 60–70% 70–80% Millner: 50–60% 60–70% 70–80%
Governor before election
Zell Miller
Democratic
Elected Governor
Zell Miller
Democratic

The 1994 Georgia gubernatorial election occurred on November 8, 1994, to elect the next governor of Georgia from 1995 to 1999. Incumbent Democratic governor Zell Miller, first elected in 1990, ran for a second term. In his party's primary, Miller received three challengers, but easily prevailed with just over 70% of the vote. The contest for the Republican nomination, however, was a competitive race. As no candidate received a majority of the vote, John Knox and Guy Millner advanced to a run-off election. Millner was victorious and received the Republican nomination after garnering 59.41% of the vote.

The general election was a competitive race between Zell Miller and Guy Millner. Issues such as welfare reform, education, and the removal of the Confederate battle flag from Georgia's state flag dominated the election. On election day, Miller defeated Millner 51.05%-48.95% in the third-closest gubernatorial election in Georgian history – behind only the 2018 and 1966 elections – since Reconstruction due to the strong Republican wave of 1994. Although the state was becoming increasingly more Republican, Democrats would retain the governor's mansion until 2003. As of 2022, this is the last time Catoosa County voted for the Democratic candidate for governor.

== Background ==
Incumbent governor Zell Miller (D) chose to run for re-election in 1994. Early in his first term, Miller's approval rating fell significantly after attempting to gain legislative support for removing the Confederate battle flag from Georgia's state flag. Miller wanted the Confederate battle flag removed before Atlanta hosted Super Bowl XXVIII and the 1996 Summer Olympics, but backed down in March 1993 after it became apparent that the Georgia House of Representatives would not support this proposal. However, following the same legislative session, Miller's popularity began to recover after bills were passed that initiated his welfare reform proposals. Miller's disapproval promptly decreased to 29% and fell further to 25% about a year later.

A week prior to the scheduled primary elections on July 12, 14 polling locations in the southwestern portion of the state were either underwater or serving as emergency shelters as a result of the disastrous flooding wrought by Tropical Storm Alberto. State officials began discussing delaying the primary elections. However, on July 19, turnout exceeded predictions.

== Democratic primary ==
=== Campaign ===
Despite pledging in 1990 to serve only one term, incumbent governor Zell Miller announced his re-election bid on June 16, 1993. During the next 12 months, three other Democrats entered the primary, they included perennial candidate Jim Boyd, State Representative Charles "Judy" Poag, and Korean War veteran Mark Tate. Boyd and Poag attacked Miller for attempting to change the state flag and increasing fees for driver's licenses, car tags, and sporting licenses. Miller defended other portions of his record, including the establishment of the Georgia Lottery, the passage of a $100 million tax cut, and a bill proposed that would take a tougher stance on violent criminals. In May 1994, Mark Tate was convicted of attempting defrauding the Department of Veterans Affairs out of $99,000 by falsely claiming he had no other source of income. His sentencing was scheduled for July 19, the day of the primary. However, Tate's name remained on the ballot.

=== Candidates ===
- Zell Miller, incumbent governor of Georgia
- Jim Boyd, candidate for Georgia's 9th congressional district in 1976 and 1982, 1984 United States Senate election, and Georgia Public Service Commissioner in 1986 and 1988
- Mark Tate, Korean War veteran
- Charles "Judy" Poag, Georgia state representative from Eton

=== Results ===
Democratic primary results by county: Miller: Miller—40–50%; Miller—50–60%; Miller—60–70%; Miller—70–80%; Miller—80–90%; Miller—>90%; Boyd: Boyd—40–50%; Poag: Poag—40–50%; Poag—>80%

Miller easily prevailed against the other three Democrats, winning just over 70% of the vote, compared to 17.06% for Boyd, 6.69% for Tate, and 6.23% for Poag. Because Miller received a majority of the votes, he immediately advanced to the general election without a run-off.

Democratic primary results
Party	Candidate	Votes	%
Democratic	Zell Miller (incumbent)	321,963	70.03
Democratic	Jim Boyd	78,444	17.06
Democratic	Mark Tate	30,749	6.69
Democratic	Charles "Judy" Poag	28,623	6.23
Total votes		459,779	100.00

== Republican primary ==
=== Campaign ===
Five Republicans entered to compete for the party nomination, including former State House Minority Leader Paul W. Heard, Jr., former mayor of Waycross John Knox, Atlanta management consultant Nimrod McNair, businessman Guy Millner, and Tift County developer Leonard Morris. Then-State Senator Johnny Isakson, Miller's 1990 general election opponent, announced his intention to run again on June 16, 1993. However, he apparently withdrew from the race well before the primary in July 1994. Bert Lance, a director of the Office of Management and Budget under President Jimmy Carter, predicted a run-off in the Republican primary. He also believed that Miller would face a tougher re-election against Paul Heard, citing his legislative experience and noting that, "Paul knows the state well and has the potential to be a strong candidate." During the primary, Heard pledged to reduce taxes and improve education, while attacking Miller's new prison release program, which, in Heard's opinion, un-incarcerated too many criminals. Similarly, Knox promised to cut income tax by $250 million in his first year in office, reform education, and make prison "hard time". Millner pledged to decrease taxes, make Georgia's education the top-ranking in the Southern United States, reform welfare, and force violent criminals to serve their entire sentence.

=== Candidates ===
==== Advanced to runoff ====
- Guy Millner, businessman
- John Knox, former mayor of Waycross and candidate for the 1992 United States Senate election

==== Defeated in primary ====
- Paul W. Heard, Jr., former State House Minority Leader
- Nimrod McNair, Atlanta management consultant
- Leonard Morris, Tift County developer

=== Results ===
Republican primary results by county: Millner: Millner—30–40%; Millner—40–50%; Millner—50–60%; Millner—60–70%; Millner—>70%; Knox: Knox—30–40%; Know—40–50%; Knox—50–60%; Knox—60–70%; Knox—70–80%; Knox—80–90%; Knox—>90%; Heard: Heard—40–50%; Heard—>50%; Morris: Morris—>60%

Republican primary results
Party	Candidate	Votes	%
Republican	Guy Millner	142,263	47.86
Republican	John Knox	84,563	28.45
Republican	Paul W. Heard, Jr.	46,761	15.73
Republican	Nimrod McNair	20,042	6.74
Republican	Leonard Morris	3,592	1.21
Total votes		297,221	100.0

==== Runoff Results ====
Republican runoff results by county: Millner: Millner—50–60%; Millner—60–70%; Millner—70–80%; Millner—>80%; Knox: Knox—50–60%; Knox—60–70%; Knox—70–80%; Knox—80–90%; Knox—>90%; Tie: Tie—50%

Republican primary runoff results
Party	Candidate	Votes	%
Republican	Guy Millner	131,280	59.41
Republican	John Knox	89,709	40.59
Total votes		220,989	100.0

== Polling ==
Source	Date	Miller (D)	Millner (R)
WXIA-TV	Nov. 6, 1994	48%	41%

== General election ==
=== Results ===
Georgia gubernatorial election, 1994
Party	Candidate	Votes	%	±%
Democratic	Zell Miller (incumbent)	788,926	51.05%	−1.83%
Republican	Guy Millner	756,371	48.95%	+4.41%
Majority		32,555	2.11%	−6.24%
Turnout		1,545,297		
Democratic hold		Swing		
