= David Poythress =

American politician

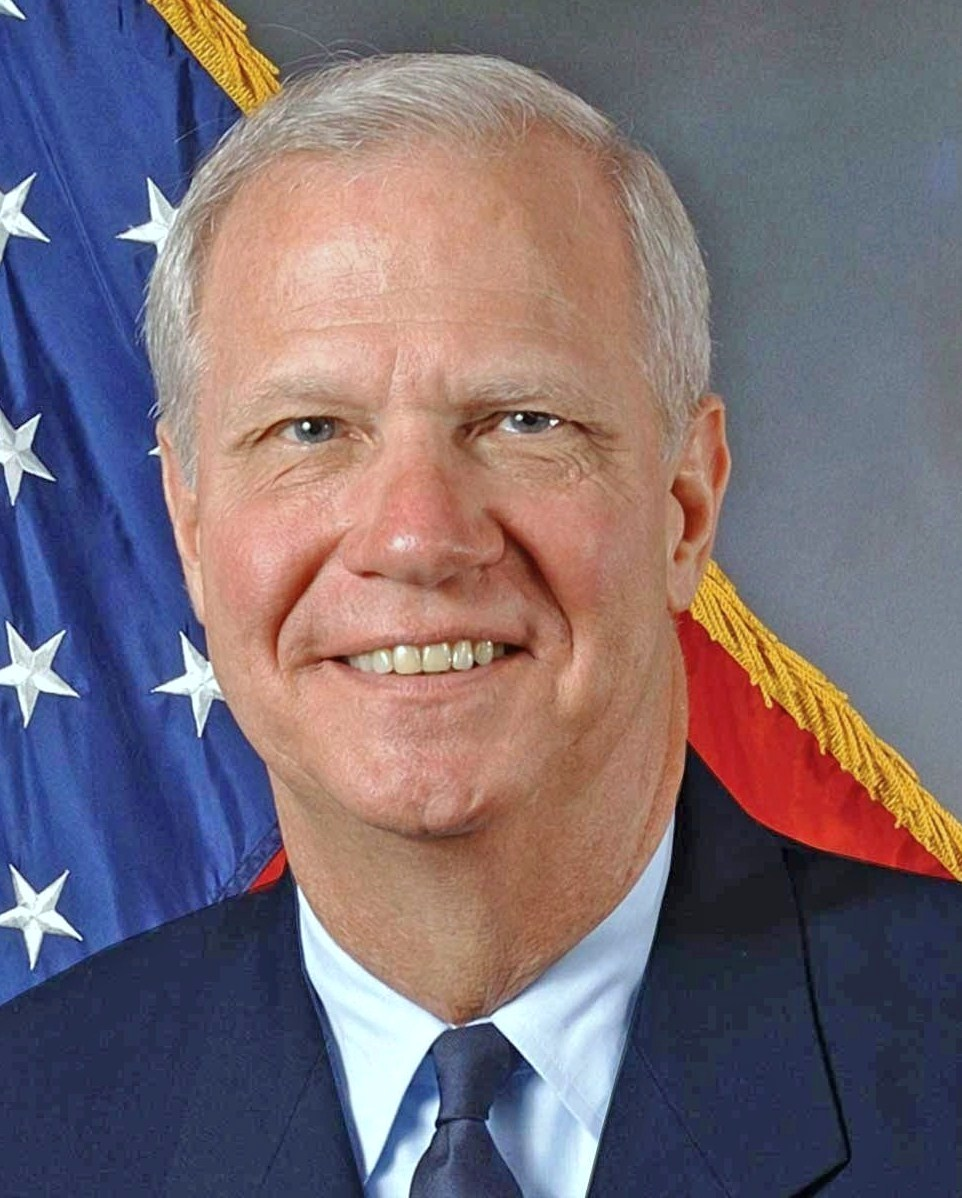

Georgia Commissioner of Labor
- In office 1993 – January 20, 1998
- Preceded by: Al Scott
- Succeeded by: Michael Thurmond

22nd Secretary of State of Georgia
- In office May 19, 1979 – January 11, 1983
- Governor: George Busbee
- Preceded by: Benjamin W. Fortson Jr.
- Succeeded by: Max Cleland

Personal details
- Born: October 24, 1943 Bibb County, Georgia, U.S.
- Died: January 15, 2017 (aged 73) Cartersville, Georgia, U.S.
- Party: Democratic
- Spouse: Elizabeth Poythress
- Education: Emory University
- Profession: Politician

Military service
- Allegiance: United States
- Branch/service: United States Air Force
- Rank: Lieutenant General

David Bryan Poythress (October 24, 1943 – January 15, 2017) was an American politician, born in Bibb County, Georgia. He served terms as Secretary of State and Commissioner of Labor of the state of Georgia. Poythress also served as the Adjutant General of the Georgia National Guard from 1999 until 2007, initially appointed by Governor Roy Barnes and subsequently reappointed by Governor Sonny Perdue. He retired as a lieutenant general.

In 1998, Poythress made an unsuccessful bid for Governor of Georgia. On August 26, 2008, Poythress announced his intention to run again as a Democratic candidate for governor in the 2010 election. In both 1998 and 2010, Poythress lost to Roy Barnes.

Poythress and his wife Elizabeth had three grown children and eight grandchildren. He was a member of the Sigma Chi fraternity. Poythress died on January 15, 2017, at the age of 73. He was interred at Riverside Cemetery in Macon, Georgia.

== Education ==
- 1964: Bachelor of arts degree in political science, Emory University, Atlanta, Ga.
- 1967: Juris doctor degree (with honors), Emory University School of Law, Atlanta, Ga.
- 1986: Air War College, by correspondence

Party political offices
Preceded by Joe Tanner	Democratic nominee for Labor Commissioner of Georgia; 1992, 1994	Succeeded by Mike Thurmond
Preceded by Benjamin W. Fortson Jr.	Secretary of State of Georgia; 1979-1983	Succeeded by Max Cleland
Preceded by Al Scott	Georgia Commissioner of Labor; 1993-1999	Succeeded by Mike Thurmond
