= 1990 Georgia gubernatorial election =

- November 6, 1990
- Turnout: 52.28% (of registered voters); 31.07% (of voting age population)
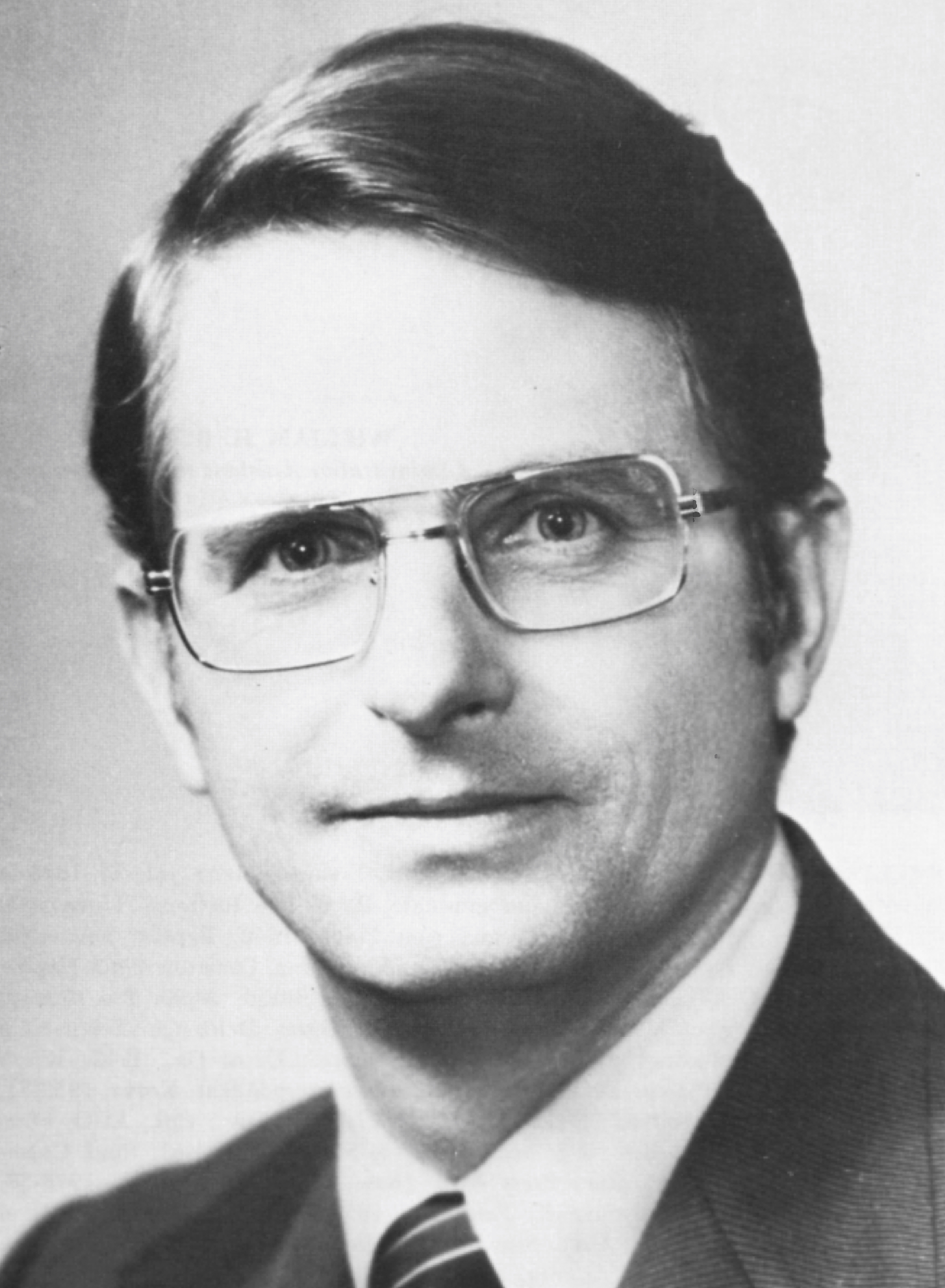

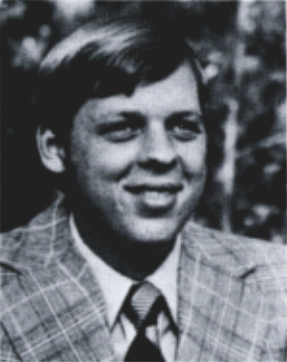
Nominee	Zell Miller	Johnny Isakson
Party	Democratic	Republican
Popular vote	766,662	645,625
Percentage	52.89%	44.54%
- County results Miller: 40–50% 50–60% 60–70% 70–80% Isakson: 50–60% 60–70%
Governor before election
Joe Frank Harris
Democratic
Elected Governor
Zell Miller
Democratic

The 1990 Georgia gubernatorial election was held on November 6, 1990. Lieutenant Governor Zell Miller ran for governor after incumbent Joe Frank Harris was term-limited, defeating Andrew Young, Roy Barnes, and Lester Maddox for the Democratic nomination, and defeated Johnny Isakson, a member of the Georgia House of Representatives. As of 2022, this is the last time that Dade, Walker, Whitfield, Murray, Gilmer, Fannin, Floyd, Gordon, Pickens, Dawson, Forsyth, Hall, Barrow, Jackson, Madison, White, Walton, Paulding, Carroll, Coweta, Troup, Spalding, Pike, Harris, Glynn, Camden, Bryan, and Effingham counties voted for the Democratic candidate for governor.

Miller later served in the U.S. Senate from 2000 to 2005, and was succeeded by Isakson, who then served until his 2019 resignation.

== Democratic primary ==
=== Candidates ===
==== Advanced to runoff ====
- Zell Miller, Lieutenant Governor since 1975
- Andrew Young, Mayor of Atlanta

==== Defeated in primary ====
- Roy Barnes, State Senator from Marietta
- Lauren 'Bubba' McDonald, Jr., State Representative from Turnerville
- Lester Maddox, former Governor of Georgia and Lieutenant Governor of Georgia

=== Results ===
Democratic primary results
Party	Candidate	Votes	%
Democratic	Zell Miller	434,405	41.28
Democratic	Andrew Young	303,159	28.81
Democratic	Roy Barnes	219,136	20.82
Democratic	Lauren 'Bubba' McDonald, Jr.	64,212	6.10
Democratic	Lester Maddox	31,403	2.98
Total votes		1,052,315	100.0

==== Runoff Results ====
Democratic primary runoff results
Party	Candidate	Votes	%
Democratic	Zell Miller	591,166	61.84
Democratic	Andrew Young	364,861	38.16
Total votes		956,027	100.0

== Republican primary ==
=== Candidates ===
- Johnny Isakson, State Representative from Marietta
- Bobby Wood, former chairman of Gwinnett County Board of Education
- Greeley Ellis
- Eli 'Link' Veazey

=== Results ===
Republican primary results
Party	Candidate	Votes	%
Republican	Johnny Isakson	87,795	74.33
Republican	Bobby Wood	14,496	12.27
Republican	Greeley Ellis	13,062	11.06
Republican	Eli "Link" Veazey	2,765	2.34
Total votes		118,118	100.0

== Election results ==
1990 gubernatorial election, Georgia
Party	Candidate	Votes	%	±%
Democratic	Zell Miller	766,662	52.89	−17.62
Republican	Johnny Isakson	645,625	44.54	+15.05
Libertarian	Carole Ann Rand	37,367	2.58	+2.58
Majority		121,037	8.35	
Turnout		1,449,654		
Democratic hold		Swing		
