= Guy Millner =

American politician (born 1936)

Personal details
- Born: February 16, 1936 (age 90) Holly Hill, Florida, U.S.
- Party: Republican
- Education: Florida State University, Tallahassee (BA)

Guy W. Millner (born February 16, 1936) is an American multi-millionaire businessman who ran as a Republican for Governor of Georgia in 1994 and 1998, and United States Senator from Georgia in 1996, losing all three races.

Millner came closest to victory in 1994, winning 49% of the vote against incumbent Governor Zell Miller's 51%, after defeating four other candidates in the Republican primary election. His subsequent defeats were by increasingly large margins. He lost to state secretary of state and former Carter Veterans Affairs Administrator Max Cleland for the United States Senate in 1996 after narrowly defeating Johnny Isakson for the Republican nomination. His final defeat, at the hands of State Representative Roy Barnes for governor in 1998, was by a margin of 52% to 44%. He has not sought office again.

Millner's campaigns were largely self-financed and he remains a major financial backer of Republican candidates.

Millner is the founder of Norrell Corporation, a temporary help company later acquired by Spherion, which in turn was acquired by Randstad NV. In 2000, he was reportedly worth more than $100 million. He later joined the board of Source2

He and his wife have hosted fundraisers at his home for Fix Georgia Pets, a nonprofit that works to spay and neuter dogs and cats in Georgia.

In 2019 he bought a waterfront condo in Palm Beach, Florida for $5 million.

Party political offices
Preceded by Johnny Isakson	Republican nominee for Governor of Georgia; 1994, 1998	Succeeded by Sonny Perdue
Vacant Title last held by Mike Hicks	Republican nominee for U.S. Senator from Georgia (Class 2); 1996	Succeeded by Saxby Chambliss
