= Max Cleland =

American politician (1942–2021)

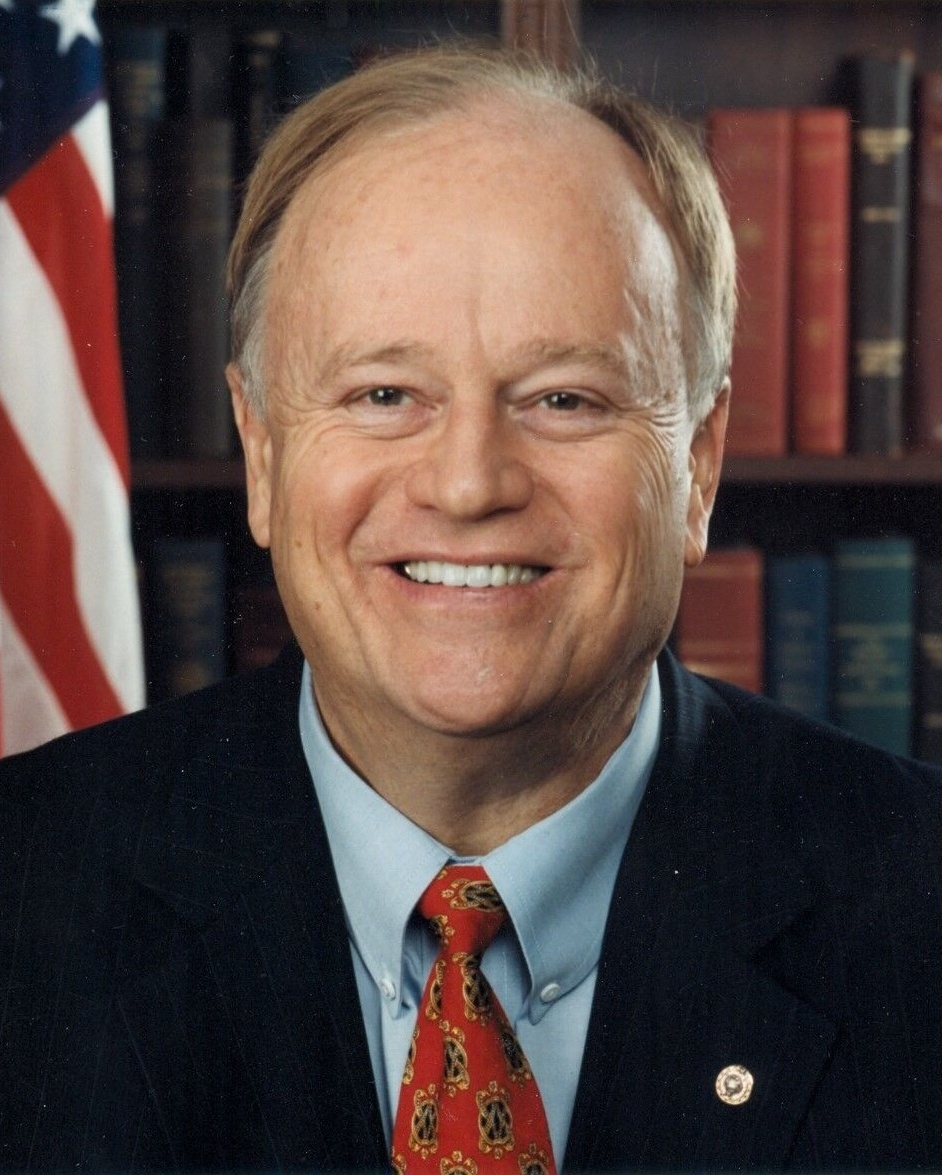

Secretary of the American Battle Monuments Commission
- In office June 3, 2009 – January 20, 2017
- President: Barack Obama
- Preceded by: John W. Nicholson
- Succeeded by: William M. Matz Jr.

United States Senator from Georgia
- In office January 3, 1997 – January 3, 2003
- Preceded by: Sam Nunn
- Succeeded by: Saxby Chambliss

23rd Secretary of State of Georgia
- In office January 11, 1983 – January 5, 1996
- Governor: Joe Frank Harris; Zell Miller
- Preceded by: David Poythress
- Succeeded by: Lewis A. Massey

10th Administrator of Veterans Affairs
- In office January 20, 1977 – January 20, 1981
- President: Jimmy Carter
- Preceded by: Richard L. Roudebush
- Succeeded by: Bob Nimmo

Member of the Georgia State Senate from the 55th district
- In office January 11, 1971 – January 13, 1975
- Preceded by: Ed Reeder
- Succeeded by: Bud Stumbaugh

Personal details
- Born: Joseph Maxwell Cleland; August 24, 1942 Atlanta, Georgia, U.S.
- Died: November 9, 2021 (aged 79) Atlanta, Georgia, U.S.
- Party: Democratic
- Education: Stetson University (BA); Emory University (MA)

Military service
- Allegiance: United States
- Branch/service: United States Army
- Years of service: 1965–1968
- Rank: Captain
- Unit: 2nd Battalion, 12th Cavalry Regiment
- Battles/wars: Vietnam War; Battle of Khe Sanh
- Awards: Silver Star; Bronze Star with "V" Device; Soldier's Medal; National Defense Service Medal; Vietnam Service Medal; Vietnam Campaign Medal

Joseph Maxwell Cleland (August 24, 1942 – November 9, 2021) was an American politician from Georgia. A member of the Democratic Party, he was a disabled U.S. Army veteran of the Vietnam War, a recipient of the Silver Star and the Bronze Star for valorous actions in combat, as well as a United States senator from 1997 to 2003.

After returning from the Vietnam War having lost three limbs, he entered politics soon after recovering from his injuries. From 1971 to 1975, he served as a Georgia state senator. He also served as Administrator of Veterans Affairs under President Jimmy Carter from 1977 to 1981 and as Georgia Secretary of State from 1982 to 1996 before being elected to a single term in the United States Senate. After leaving the Senate in 2003, he served on the board of directors of the Export-Import Bank of the United States from 2003 to 2007, a presidentially appointed position. From 2009 to 2017, he served as Secretary of the American Battle Monuments Commission.

== Early life and military service ==
Cleland was born on August 24, 1942, in Atlanta, the son of Juanita Wilda (Kesler) and Joseph Hughie Cleland. He grew up in Lithonia, Georgia, and graduated from Lithonia High School and then from Stetson University in the class of 1964, where he was a member of the Lambda Chi Alpha fraternity. Cleland was named outstanding senior in high school. He went on to receive a master's degree from Emory University.

Cleland then served in the United States Army during the Vietnam War, attaining the rank of captain. He was awarded the Silver Star and the Bronze Star for valorous action in combat, including during the Battle of Khe Sanh on April 4, 1968.

=== Injury at Khe Sanh ===
In 1968, Captain Cleland was the Battalion Signal Officer serving with the 2nd Battalion, 12th Cavalry Regiment, 1st Cavalry Division during the Battle of Khe Sanh. On April 8, with a month left in his tour, Cleland was ordered to set up a radio relay station on a nearby hill. A helicopter flew him and two soldiers to the treeless top of Hill 471, east of Khe Sanh. When the helicopter landed, Cleland jumped out, followed by the two soldiers. They ducked because of the rotor wash and turned to watch the liftoff. Cleland reached down to pick up a grenade he believed had dropped off his flak jacket. It then exploded, the blast slamming him backward, shredding both his legs and one arm.

David Lloyd, a U.S. Marine in a nearby mortar bunker, rushed to the scene, took off his web belt and tied it around one of Cleland's legs to control bleeding.

Lloyd said the unnamed soldier was crying. "It was mine," he said, "it was my grenade." According to Lloyd, the private had failed to take the extra precaution experienced soldiers did when they grabbed M26 grenades from the ammo box: bend the pins, or tape them in place, so they couldn't accidentally dislodge. This soldier had a flak jacket full of grenades with straight pins. "He was a walking death trap."

Due to the severity of his wounds, doctors amputated both of Cleland's legs above the knee, and his right forearm. He was 25 years old.

== Georgia state politics ==
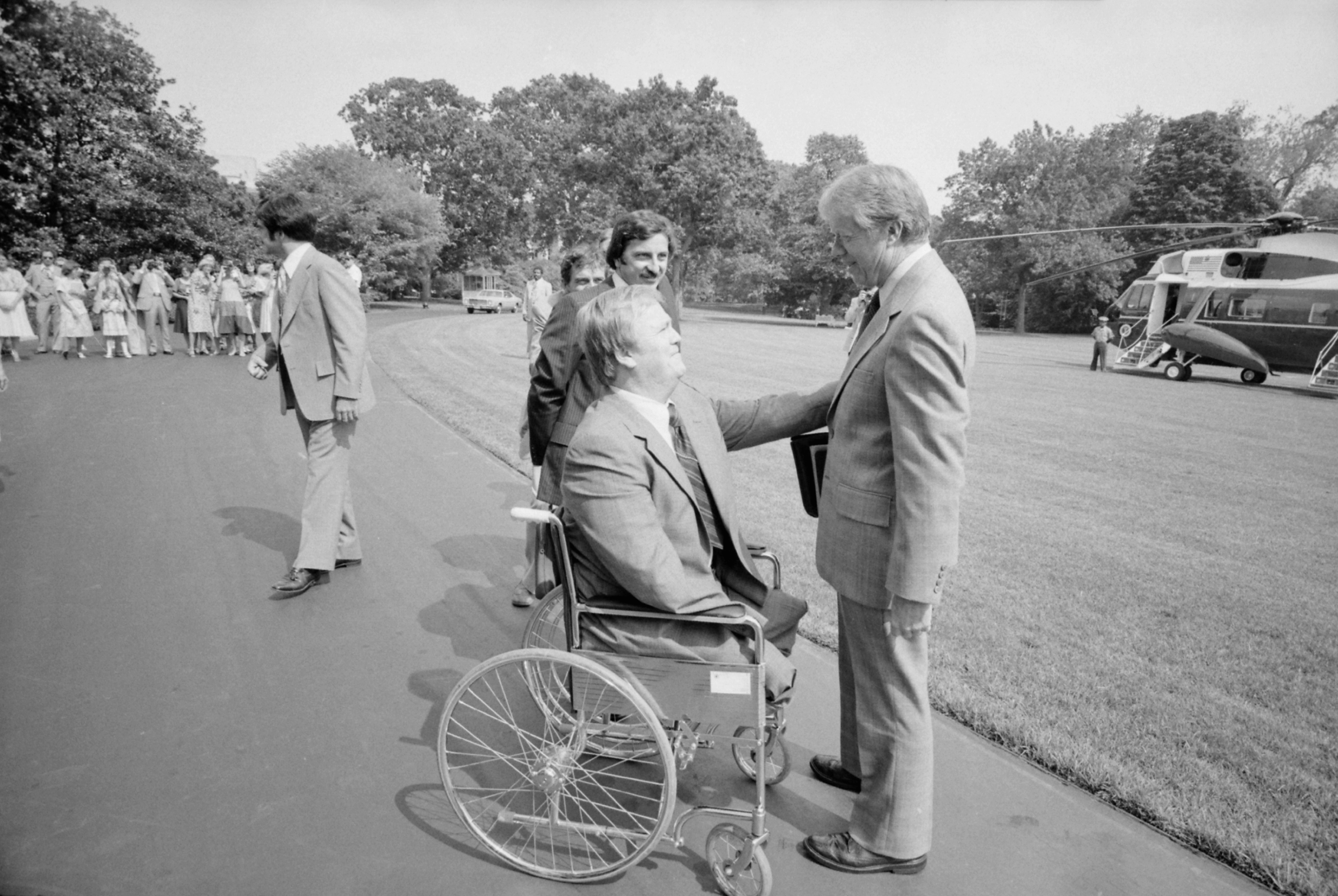
Max Cleland with President Jimmy Carter, c. 1978

Cleland served from 1971 to 1975 in the Georgia State Senate, and became an advocate for affairs relating to veterans. He was the administrator of the United States Veterans Administration under President Jimmy Carter from 1977 to 1981 (Carter himself was Governor of Georgia at the time Cleland was a member of the State Senate). He then served 14 years as Secretary of State of Georgia from 1982 to 1996, working closely with his future Senate colleague, Zell Miller. During this period, Cleland promoted a penny stock law in Georgia which would become the template for national regulations to curb stock manipulation abuses. In the 1992 Democratic presidential primaries, Cleland supported fellow Vietnam veteran Bob Kerrey.

According to an interview featurette with Jon Voight on the DVD of Coming Home (1978), Cleland also served during this time as a consultant on the Academy Award-winning drama set in a VA hospital in 1968.

In 1977, Cleland received the Samuel S. Beard Award for Greatest Public Service by an Individual 35 Years or Under, an award given out annually by Jefferson Awards.

== United States Senator (1997–2003) ==
Following the retirement of Sam Nunn, Cleland ran for the United States Senate in 1996 and won by 30,024 votes over Republican Guy Millner.

=== Tenure ===
Cleland was viewed as a moderate in the Senate. Although he supported some Republican budgetary measures, and voted in favor of George W. Bush's 2001 tax-cut package, he was staunchly pro-choice and pro-environment. He voted against drilling in Arctic National Wildlife Refuge, and opposed Gale Norton's nomination as Secretary of the Interior in 2001. His record on national defense and homeland security was more centrist. He voted to federalize airport security after 9/11, and supported the War on Terror. Cleland was strongly for free trade, voting to normalize trade relations with Vietnam, to make China's NTR status permanent, and to extend free trade to Andean nations.

Cleland was among 29 Senate Democrats who backed the authorization to go to war in Iraq. He later stated he had misgivings about the Bush administration's stance, but said he felt pressure in his tight Senate race to go along with it. In 2005, he said "it was obvious that if I voted against the resolution that I would be dead meat in the race, just handing them in a victory." He characterized his vote for war as "the worst vote I cast."

== 2002 election ==
In 2002 Cleland faced Saxby Chambliss for the Georgia Senate seat. Cleland enjoyed a comfortable lead in the polls early in the race but lost much ground in the weeks running up to the election. In May 2002 Chambliss was trailing Cleland by 22 percentage points. Chambliss issued a press release decrying Senator Cleland for "breaking his oath to protect and defend the Constitution," because Cleland had voted for an amendment to the Chemical Weapons Treaty that would allow individuals from "terrorist nations" to be on United Nations weapons inspection teams in Iraq. The vote passed by a majority, 56 to 44. Fifty-five other senators also voted for the amendment, including Bill Frist, the head of the Republican Senate committee, who picked Chambliss to run against Cleland.

A week before the voting, an Atlanta Journal-Constitution poll showed Cleland ahead by five points, 49% to 44%. By Saturday before the race, a poll by the Atlanta Journal-Constitution the lead had shrunk to 48% to 45% which was within the poll's margin of error. On election day, Cleland lost to Chambliss by 139,296 votes. Some supporters blamed a Chambliss television ad created by consultant Rick Wilson featuring the likenesses of Osama bin Laden and Saddam Hussein while criticizing Cleland's votes against homeland security measures. This was based on the fact that Cleland had voted against legislation enabling the creation of the Department of Homeland Security on the basis that a provision limiting the rights of unionized labor had been inserted into the bill. Cleland supporters claimed the ad questioned the senator's patriotism, while Chambliss supporters claimed it simply questioned his judgment. The ad was removed after protests from prominent politicians, including Republicans such as John McCain and Chuck Hagel, both of whom were also veterans of the war in Vietnam.

== Post-Senate career ==
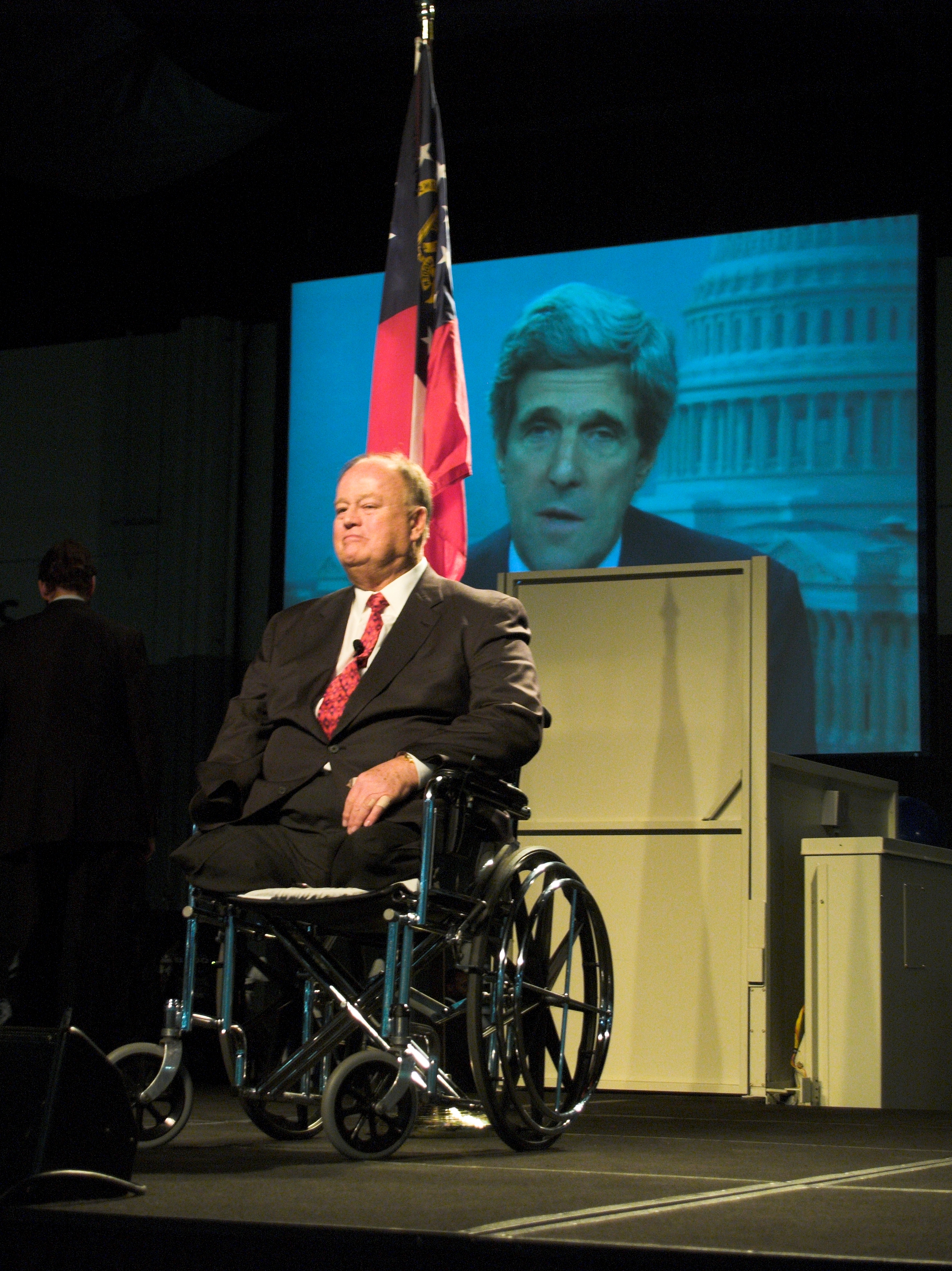
Cleland at the 2008 Georgia Jefferson-Jackson Dinner

Cleland was originally appointed to serve on the 9/11 Commission but resigned shortly after, having been appointed to the board of directors of the Export-Import Bank of the United States. Before his resignation, he said that the Bush administration was "stonewalling" and blocking the committee's access to key documents and witnesses. A key figure in the widespread criticism of governmental opacity regarding 9/11, he was quoted as saying in November 2003: "I... cannot look any American in the eye, especially family members of victims, and say the commission had full access. This investigation is now compromised."

In 2003, Cleland began working for the 2004 presidential campaign of Massachusetts senator John Kerry, also a Vietnam veteran; Kerry went on to win the Democratic nomination. Cleland often appeared at campaign events with Kerry and was considered by many to be one of his most important surrogates, partly as a symbol of the sacrifices made by soldiers for wars. On July 29, 2004, Cleland introduced Kerry with a speech at the Democratic National Convention.

Cleland's official Senatorial papers are held by the University of Georgia's Richard B. Russell Library for Political Research and Studies. His Veterans Administration papers are held in the Jimmy Carter Presidential Library. In 2007, Max Cleland donated a large collection of Vietnam and personal political memorabilia to the library of his alma mater, Stetson University. The Cleland Collection includes more than 800 memorabilia items, more than 5,000 photos, and hundreds of CDs, DVDs, videos, and films.

On May 21, 2009, President Barack Obama nominated Cleland to serve as the next Secretary of the American Battle Monuments Commission. He was appointed Secretary on June 3, and served in the position until the end of Obama's second term as president. Retired Major General William M. Matz Jr., was appointed as his successor almost a year after he left the ABMC.

Cleland died as a result of heart failure at his home in Atlanta, on November 9, 2021, at age 79.

== Awards ==
Cleland received an honorary degree in 2001 from Oglethorpe University as a Doctor of Laws.

== Works ==
- Heart of a Patriot: How I Found The Courage To Survive Vietnam, Walter Reed, and Karl Rove by Max Cleland, with Ben Raines (Simon and Schuster, 2009). ISBN 978-1-4391-2605-9.
- Odysseus in America by Jonathan Shay, Max Cleland, and John McCain (Scribner, November 2002). ISBN 0-7432-1156-1.
- Strong at the Broken Places by Max Cleland (Longstreet Press, updated edition, October 2000). ISBN 1-56352-633-6.
- Going for the Max!: 12 Principles for Living Life to the Fullest by Max Cleland (Broadman & Holman, September 2000). ISBN 0-8054-2021-5.
- Controlled Substances Laws of Georgia: Code Title 16-13 by Max Cleland (State Examining Boards, Georgia State Board of Pharmacy, 1992). OCLC 36381622.

== Electoral history ==
Georgia Senator (Class II): Results 1996–2002
Year	Democrat	Votes	Pct	Republican	Votes	Pct	3rd Party	Party	Votes	Pct
1996	Max Cleland	1,103,993	49%	Guy W. Millner	1,073,969	48%	John Gregory Cashin	Libertarian	81,262	4%
2002	Max Cleland (incumbent)	932,422	46%	Saxby Chambliss	1,071,352	53%	Claude Sandy Thomas	Libertarian	27,830	1%

== See also ==
- List of members of the American Legion

Political offices
Preceded by Richard Roudebush	Administrator of Veterans Affairs; 1977–1981	Succeeded by Bob Nimmo
Preceded by David Poythress	Secretary of State of Georgia; 1983–1997	Succeeded by Lewis Massey
Party political offices
Preceded by Benjamin W. Fortson Jr.	Democratic nominee for Secretary of State of Georgia; 1982, 1986, 1990, 1994	Succeeded by Lewis A. Massey
Preceded by Sam Nunn	Democratic nominee for U.S. Senator from Georgia (Class 2); 1996, 2002	Succeeded by Jim Martin
U.S. Senate
Preceded by Sam Nunn	U.S. Senator (Class 2) from Georgia; 1997–2003; Served alongside: Paul Coverdell, Zell Miller	Succeeded by Saxby Chambliss
