= Zell Miller =

American politician (1932–2018)

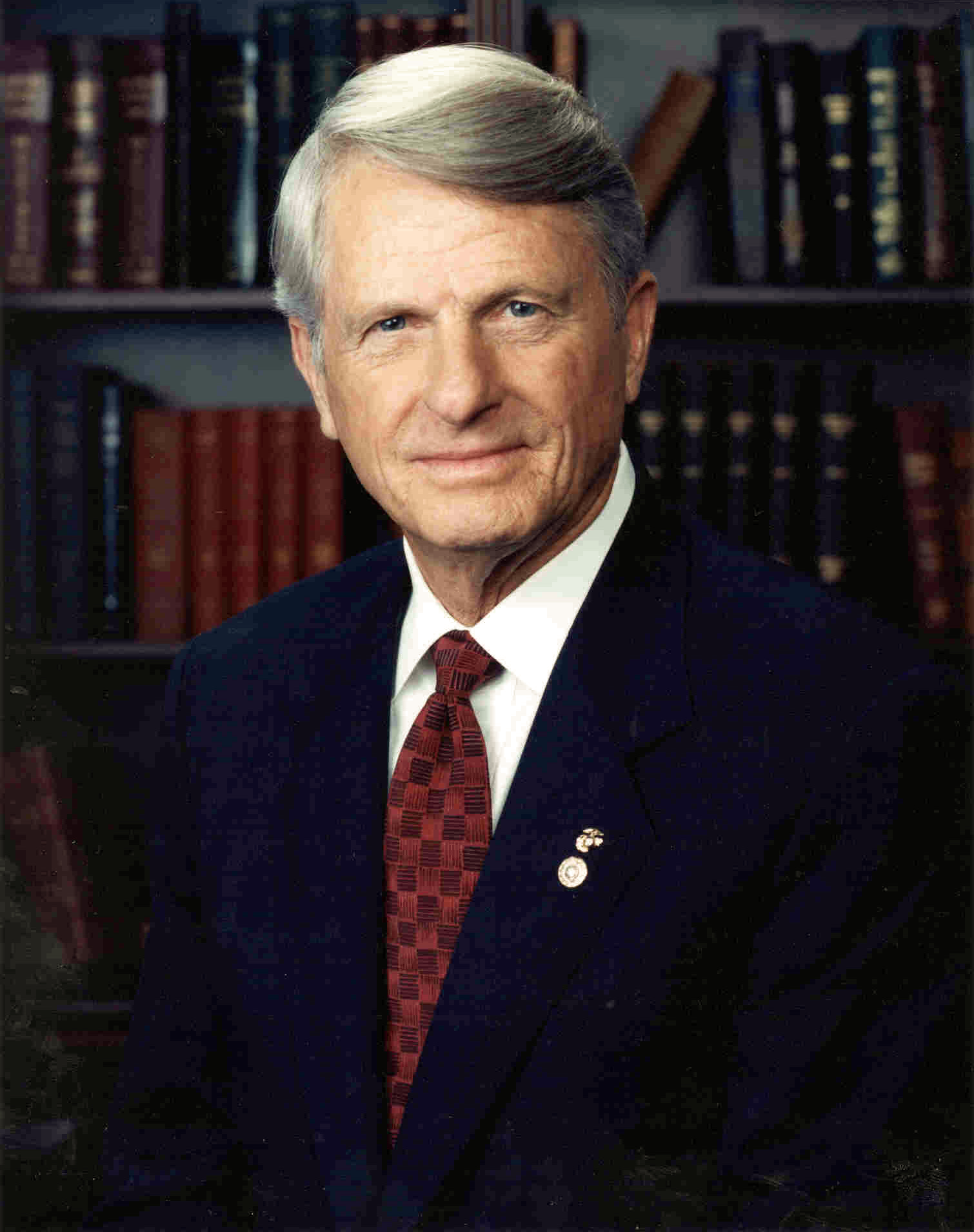
- Portrait, c. 2000–2005

United States Senator from Georgia
- In office July 24, 2000 – January 3, 2005
- Preceded by: Paul Coverdell
- Succeeded by: Johnny Isakson

79th Governor of Georgia
- In office January 14, 1991 – January 11, 1999
- Lieutenant: Pierre Howard
- Preceded by: Joe Frank Harris
- Succeeded by: Roy Barnes

8th Lieutenant Governor of Georgia
- In office January 14, 1975 – January 14, 1991
- Governor: George Busbee; Joe Frank Harris
- Preceded by: Lester Maddox
- Succeeded by: Pierre Howard

25th Chair of the National Lieutenant Governors Association
- In office 1984–1985
- Preceded by: William Scranton III
- Succeeded by: John Mutz

Member of the Georgia State Senate
- In office January 9, 1961 – January 11, 1965
- Preceded by: Russell Ellis Cannon
- Succeeded by: Robert Ballew
- Constituency: 40th (1961–1963); 50th (1963–1965)

Personal details
- Born: Zell Bryan Miller; February 24, 1932 Young Harris, Georgia, U.S.
- Died: March 23, 2018 (aged 86) Young Harris, Georgia, U.S.
- Party: Democratic
- Spouse: Shirley Carver (m. 1954)
- Children: 2
- Education: Young Harris College (AA); University of Georgia (BA, MA)

Military service
- Branch/service: United States Marine Corps
- Years of service: 1953–1956
- Rank: Sergeant
- Miller's voice Miller on the consequences of the direct election of senators. Recorded April 28, 2004

Zell Bryan Miller (February 24, 1932 – March 23, 2018) was an American politician who served as the 79th governor of Georgia from 1991 to 1999 and as a United States senator representing the state from 2000 to 2005. He was a member of the Democratic Party and is the last Democrat as of 2026 to be elected twice as Governor of Georgia.

Miller served as lieutenant governor of Georgia from 1975 to 1991. He was a conservative Democrat as a senator in the 2000s. In 2004, he backed Republican president George W. Bush over Democratic nominee John Kerry in the presidential election. Miller was a keynote speaker at both major American political parties' national conventions–Democratic in 1992 and Republican in 2004.

He did not seek re-election to the Senate in 2004. After retiring from the Senate, he joined the law firm McKenna Long & Aldridge as a non-lawyer professional in the firm's national government affairs practice. Miller was also a Fox News contributor. After he left his office in 2005, no Georgia Democrats were elected to the United States Senate for 16 years until Raphael Warnock and Jon Ossoff won in 2020-21.

== Early life and military career ==
Miller was born in the small mountain town of Young Harris, Georgia. His father, Stephen Grady Miller, was a teacher who died of cerebral meningitis when Miller was a 17-day-old infant, and the future politician was raised by his widowed mother, Birdie Bryan. He had a sister, Jane, who was six years older than he. As a child, Miller lived both in Young Harris and Atlanta. Miller received an associate degree from Young Harris College in his home town and later attended Emory University.

Less than a month after the Korean War armistice, Miller wound up in a drunk tank in the mountains of North Georgia. Miller stated later that this incident was the lowest point of his life. Upon his release, Miller enlisted in the Marines. During his three years in the United States Marine Corps, Miller attained the rank of sergeant. He often referred to the value of his experience in the Marine Corps in his writing and stump speeches. In his book on the subject, entitled Corps Values: Everything You Need to Know I Learned in the Marines, he wrote:

In the twelve weeks of hell and transformation that were Marine Corps boot camp, I learned the values of achieving a successful life that have guided and sustained me on the course which, although sometimes checkered and detoured, I have followed ever since.

After serving in the Marines, Miller enrolled in 1956 and earned bachelor's and master's degrees in history from the University of Georgia. He taught history at Young Harris College following his graduation from the University of Georgia.

== Political career ==
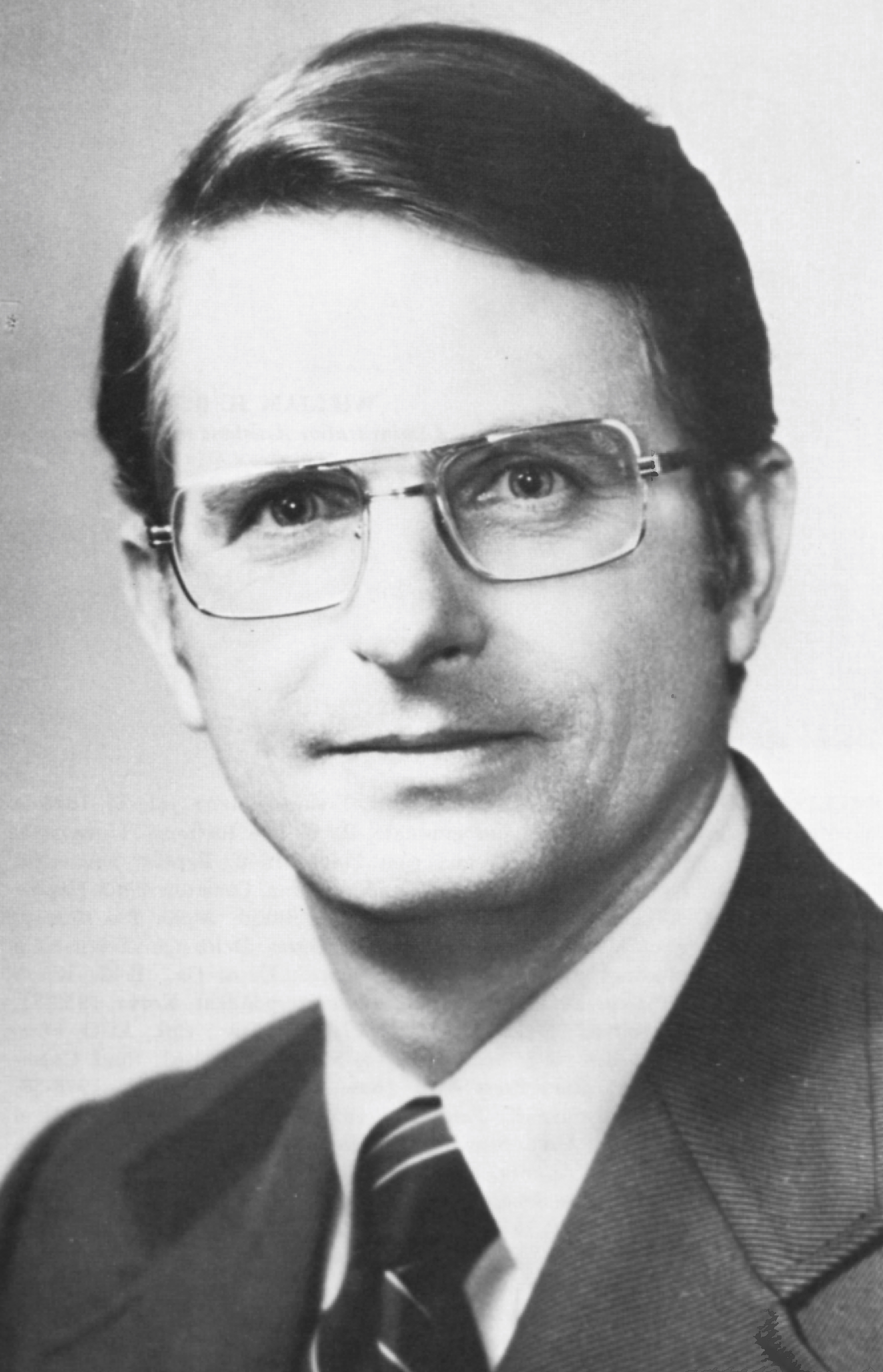
Miller as Lieutenant Governor in 1975

Miller's parents were both involved in local politics in the North Georgia mountains. Miller, a Democrat, taught history and political science at Young Harris College, before becoming mayor of Young Harris from 1959 to 1960. He was elected to two terms as a Georgia state senator from 1961 until 1964. In 1964 and 1966, Miller unsuccessfully sought the Democratic nomination for the United States House of Representatives. He endorsed segregation in both races. In these congressional races, Miller denounced Lyndon Johnson as ""a Southerner who has sold his birthright for a mess of dark porridge.". Miller later served in state government as the executive secretary to Governor Lester Maddox and in the Georgia Democratic Party, and was the Georgia state chairman for Walter Mondale's 1984 presidential campaign.

Miller's first experience in the executive branch of government was as Chief of Staff for Georgia governor Lester Maddox. Although Maddox had run on a segregationist platform, Miller convinced Maddox to do many shocking things in office, such as integrating the Georgia State Patrol, appointing African Americans to government positions, and reforming prisons. Miller was elected Lieutenant Governor of Georgia in 1974, serving four terms from 1975 to 1991, through the terms of Governors George Busbee and Joe Frank Harris, making him the longest-serving lieutenant governor in Georgia history. In 1980, Miller unsuccessfully challenged Herman Talmadge in the Democratic primary for his seat in the United States Senate. By 1980, Miller had become associated with the liberal wing of the Georgia Democratic Party and attacked Talmadge's fiscal conservatism and Talmadge's past support for segregation. (Despite Miller's own support for segregation in his 1964 and 1966 congressional bids and his tenure as chief of staff under the segregationist Maddox.)Some analysts surmised that Miller so severely weakened Talmadge in the primary, considered one of Georgia's nastiest, that it caused Talmadge to narrowly lose in the fall to Georgia's first Republican elected to the Senate since Reconstruction, Mack Mattingly.

=== Governor of Georgia ===
Miller was elected governor of Georgia in 1990, defeating Republican Johnny Isakson (who later became his successor as U.S. Senator) after defeating former Atlanta Mayor Andrew Young and future Governor Roy Barnes in the primary. Miller campaigned on the concept of term limits and pledged to seek only a single term as governor. He was reelected in 1994. James Carville was Miller's campaign manager.

In 1991, Miller endorsed Governor Bill Clinton of Arkansas for president. Miller gave the keynote speech at the 1992 Democratic National Convention at Madison Square Garden in New York City. In two oft-recalled lines, Miller said that President George H. W. Bush "just doesn't get it", and he remarked of a statement by Vice President Dan Quayle:

I know what Dan Quayle means when he says it's best for children to have two parents. You bet it is! And it would be nice for them to have trust funds, too. We can't all be born rich and handsome and lucky. And that's why we have a Democratic Party. My family would still be isolated and destitute if we had not had F.D.R.'s Democratic brand of government. I made it because Franklin Delano Roosevelt energized this nation. I made it because Harry Truman fought for working families like mine. I made it because John Kennedy's rising tide lifted even our tiny boat. I made it because Lyndon Johnson showed America that people who were born poor didn't have to die poor. And I made it because a man with whom I served in the Georgia Senate, a man named Jimmy Carter, brought honesty and decency and integrity to public service.

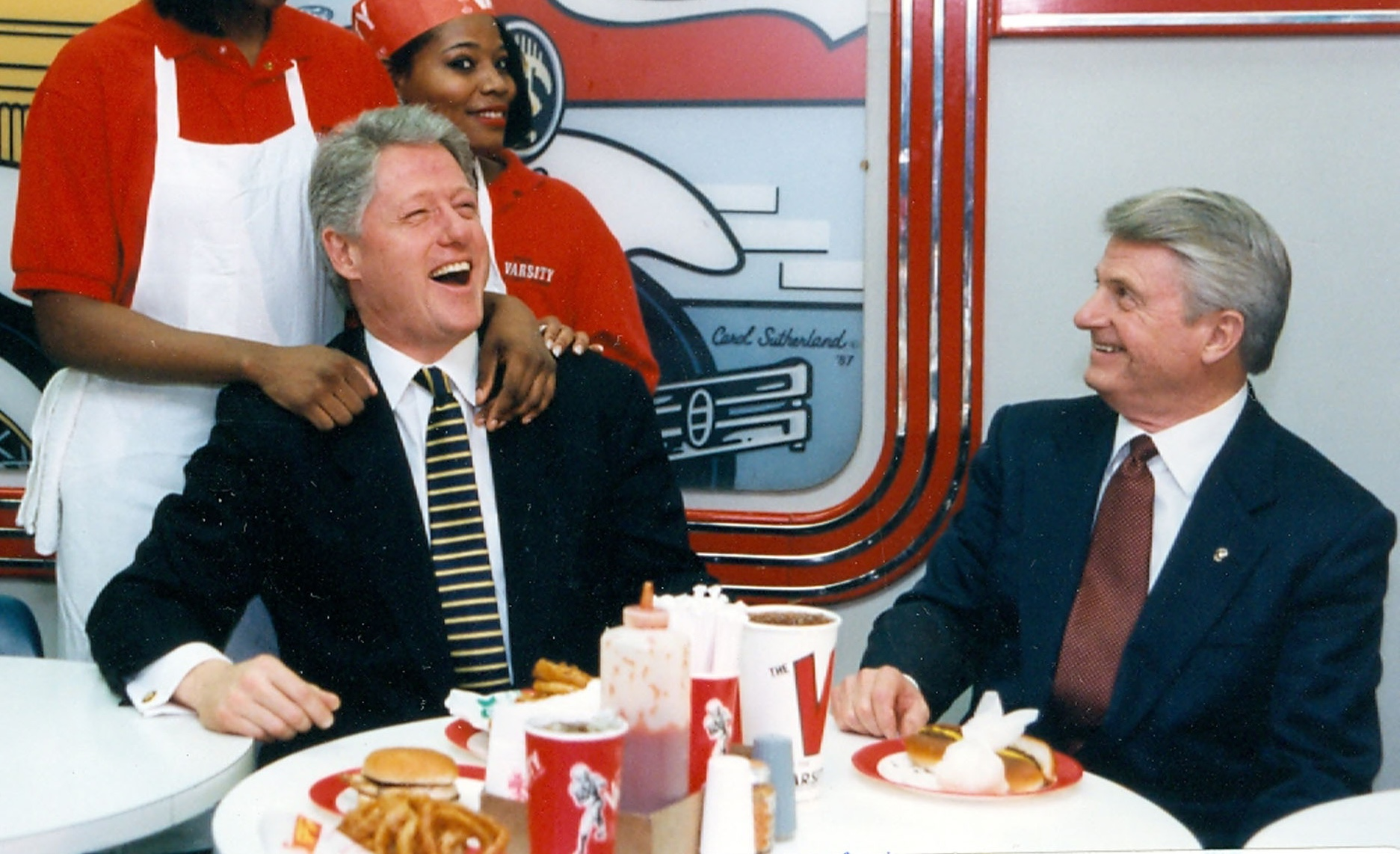
Gov. Zell Miller with President Bill Clinton at The Varsity in Atlanta, January 15, 1996

Twelve years later, Miller would give the keynote address at the opposing party's convention, also held at New York's Madison Square Garden, in 2004.

As governor, Miller was perhaps best known for his advocacy of a law passed in Georgia known as "two strikes and you're out", as any person convicted for the second time of any included offense would automatically be sentenced to life imprisonment without the possibility of parole. The law derives its name from and stands in contrast to the three strikes law, and is also known as the Seven-deadly-sins law. The law was passed in April 1994, although it had been advocated by Miller for many years previously. It was approved by voters on November 8, 1994, and was signed into law by then Governor Zell Miller on December 15, 1994, and went into effect on January 1, 1995. The law is codified and found under Title 17, Chapter 10, Section 7 (OCGA Section 17-10-7) of the Official Code of Georgia Annotated. The law states that those convicted of second-degree murder, armed robbery, or kidnapping (of a person 14 years of age or older) must serve a minimum term of 10 years in prison, and those convicted of rape, kidnapping of a minor under 14 years old, aggravated sexual battery, aggravated sodomy or aggravated child molestation must serve a minimum term of not less than 25 years in prison. First-degree murder is punishable by death, life without parole, or life in prison with no parole until the offender serves at least 30 years in prison. These crimes are known in Georgia as the "seven deadly sins".

As governor, Miller was a staunch promoter of public education. He helped found the HOPE Scholarship, which paid for the college tuition of Georgia students who both established a GPA of 3.0 in high school and maintained the same while in college, and who were from families earning less than $66,000 per year. The HOPE Scholarships were funded by revenue collected from the state lottery. In December 1995, his office announced a proposal for $1 billion more in spending on education. HOPE won praise from national Democratic leaders. The HOPE Scholarship program still to this day provides Georgia students with an opportunity to attend a public college or university, who otherwise may have no opportunity to do so.

Upon leaving the governor's office in January 1999, Miller accepted teaching positions at Young Harris College, Emory University, and the University of Georgia. He was a visiting professor at all three institutions when he was appointed to the U.S. Senate in 2000.

=== U. S. Senator ===
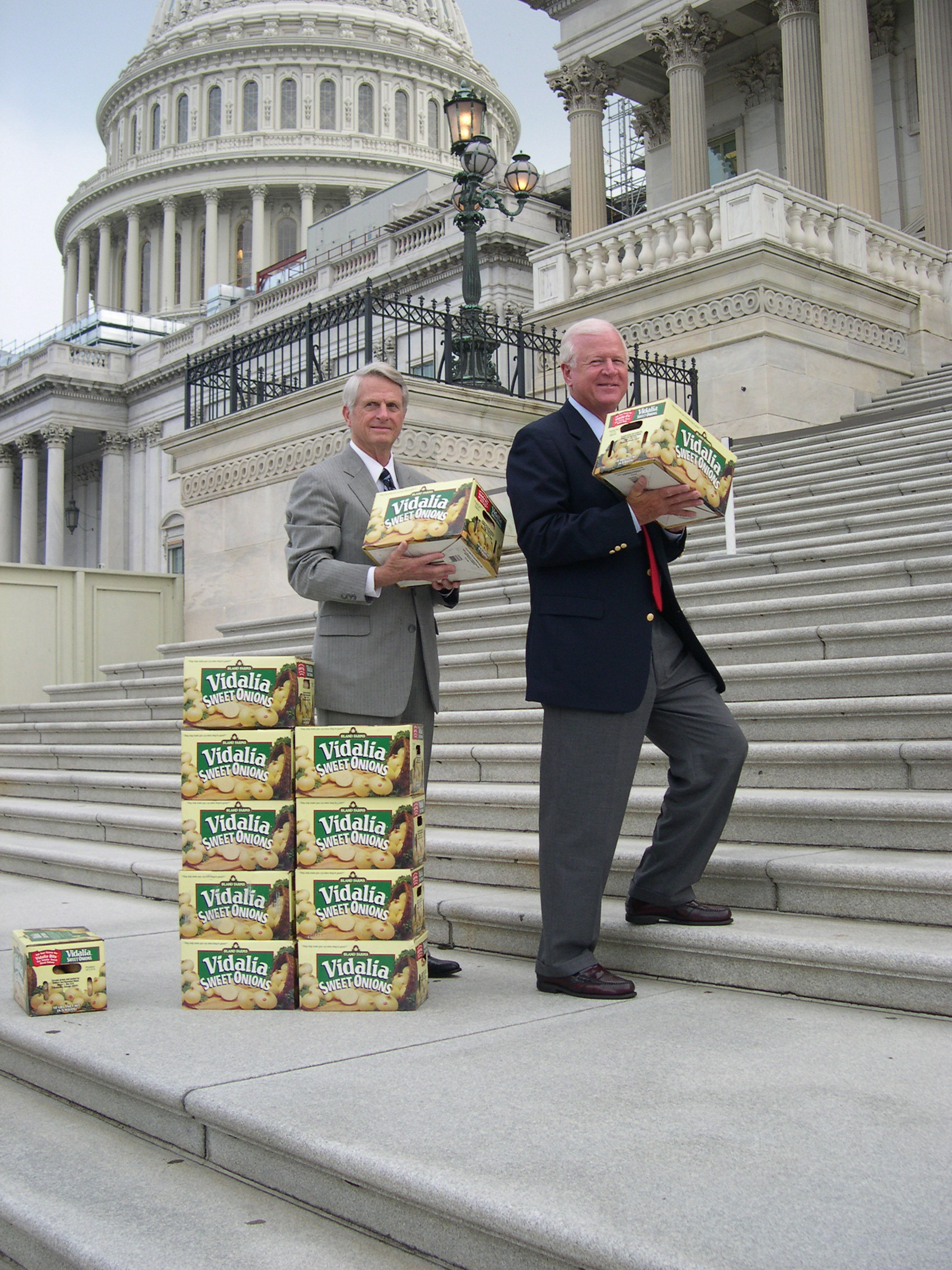
Miller and Saxby Chambliss in 2004

Miller's successor as governor, Roy Barnes, appointed Miller to a U.S. Senate seat following the death of Republican senator Paul Coverdell in July 2000. Although the Democratic Party's historic control of Georgia politics had been waning for years, Miller remained popular. He defeated former U.S. Senator Mack Mattingly in a special election to keep the seat in November 2000.

Miller often supported Republicans and criticized Democrats during his tenure in the Senate. He supported much of George W. Bush's agenda, including tax cuts (which Miller co-sponsored) and oil drilling in the Arctic National Wildlife Refuge. He supported anti-abortion policies as a senator, after supporting abortion rights as governor. He also supported a constitutional amendment banning gay marriage as senator, after inviting the Gay Games to Atlanta as governor. However, Miller remained a Democrat, saying, "I'll be a Democrat 'til the day I die." Miller campaigned for fellow Georgia Democrat Max Cleland in his 2002 re-election campaign against Republican Congressman Saxby Chambliss, despite their ideological differences.

Miller argued in his book A National Party No More: The Conscience of a Conservative Democrat (authored and published in 2003) that the Democratic Party lost its majority because it did not stand for the same ideals that it did in the era of John F. Kennedy. He argued that the Democratic Party, as it now stood, was a far left-wing party that was out of touch with the America of today and that the Republican Party now embraced the conservative Democratic ideals that he had held for so long. The book spent nine weeks in the New York Times Best Seller list for hardcover non-fiction, peaking at number four.

In 2003, Miller announced that he would not seek re-election after completing his term in the Senate. He also announced that he would support President George W. Bush in the 2004 presidential election rather than any of the nine candidates then competing for his own party's nomination. Shortly after announcing his retirement, Miller began to call for the repeal of the Seventeenth Amendment to the U.S. Constitution, which allowed for the direct election of U.S. Senators, rather than having U.S. Senators be elected by state legislatures. During his four years in the Senate, Zell Miller received a cumulative rating of 70% from the American Conservative Union, including a rating of 96% in 2004.

=== 2004 election support for Republicans ===
In his keynote speech at the 2004 Republican National Convention, delivered on September 1, 2004, Miller criticized the state of the Democratic Party. He said, "No pair has been more wrong, more loudly, more often than the two senators from Massachusetts – Ted Kennedy and John Kerry." He also criticized John Kerry's Senate voting record, claiming that Kerry's votes against bills for defense and weapon systems indicated support for weakening U.S. military strength.

The B-1 bomber, that Senator Kerry opposed, dropped 40 percent of the bombs in the first six months of Enduring Freedom. The B-2 bomber, that Senator Kerry opposed, delivered air strikes against the Taliban in Afghanistan and Hussein's command post in Iraq. The F-14A Tomcats, that Senator Kerry opposed, shot down Khadafi's (sic) Libyan MiGs over the Gulf of Sidra. The modernized F-14D, that Senator Kerry opposed, delivered missile strikes against Tora Bora. The Apache helicopter, that Senator Kerry opposed, took out those Republican Guard tanks in Kuwait in the Gulf War. The F-15 Eagles, that Senator Kerry opposed, flew cover over our Nation's Capital and this very city after 9/11. I could go on and on and on: against the Patriot Missile that shot down Saddam Hussein's Scud missiles over Israel; against the Aegis air-defense cruiser; against the Strategic Defense Initiative; against the Trident missile; against, against, against. This is the man who wants to be the Commander in Chief of the U.S. Armed Forces? U.S. forces armed with what? Spitballs?!

The speech was well received by the convention attendees, especially the Georgia delegates. Conservative commentator Michael Barone compared the speech to the views and ideology of Andrew Jackson.

Miller's combative reaction to post-speech media interviews received almost as much attention as the speech itself. First, in an interview with CNN, Miller had a dispute with Judy Woodruff, Wolf Blitzer, and Jeff Greenfield when they questioned him on his speech, particularly on whether he had misinterpreted the context and full content of Kerry's votes, and the fact that Dick Cheney, as Defense Secretary, had opposed some of the same programs he attacked Kerry for voting against.

Shortly thereafter, Miller appeared in an interview with Chris Matthews on the MSNBC show Hardball. After Miller expressed irritation at Matthews' line of questioning, Matthews pressed Miller with the question, "Do you believe now – do you believe, Senator, truthfully, that John Kerry wants to defend the country with spitballs?" Miller angrily told Matthews, "That was a metaphor, wasn't it? Do you know what a metaphor is? This is your program, and I'm a guest on your program, so I want to try to be as nice as I possibly can to you. I wish I was over there where I could get a little closer up into your face...I knew you was gonna be coming with all of that stuff...I think we ought to cancel this interview...get out of my face", and declared, "I wish we lived in the day where you could challenge a person to a duel." Miller later said about the interview, "That was terrible. I embarrassed myself. I'd rather it had not happened."

After Bush won the election of 2004, Miller referred to the Republican victories in that election (including a sweep of five open Senate seats in the South) as a sign that Democrats did not relate to most Americans. Calling for Democrats to change their message, he authored a column, which appeared in The Washington Times on November 4, 2004, in which he wrote:

Fiscal responsibility is unbelievable in the face of massive new spending promises. A foreign policy based on the strength of 'allies' like France is unacceptable ... A strong national defense policy is just not believable coming from a candidate who built a career as an anti-war veteran, an anti-military candidate and an anti-action senator. ... When will national Democrats sober up and admit that that dog won't hunt? Secular socialism, heavy taxes, big spending, weak defense, limitless lawsuits and heavy regulation – that pack of beagles hasn't caught a rabbit in the South or Midwest in years.

=== Post-2004 endorsements ===
In 2008, after Barack Obama was elected president and Democrats increased their majorities in the House and Senate, Miller endorsed Republican Saxby Chambliss in the Senate run-off against Democrat Jim Martin and criticized Obama over "spreading the wealth."

In 2012, Miller served as the national co-chair to the campaign of Republican presidential candidate Newt Gingrich. The same year, Miller endorsed Doug Collins, the Republican candidate in the 9th District of Georgia congressional race.

In 2014, Miller endorsed major Georgia candidates in both parties. He made a TV ad supporting the candidacy of Michelle Nunn, who was the Democratic nominee for the U.S. Senate. He appeared in the ad with her, saying he was "angry about what's going on in Washington, partisanship over patriotism" and praised Nunn as a "bridge-builder, not a bridge-burner." However, he also endorsed incumbent Republican governor Nathan Deal for reelection.

== Life after politics ==
In August 2005, President Bush appointed Miller to the American Battle Monuments Commission.

In 2005, Miller was elected to the board of directors of the National Rifle Association of America.

Miller was a speaker at "Justice Sunday II", an event organized by conservative Christian evangelicals to combat alleged liberal bias in the federal judiciary of the United States. The event was held in Nashville, Tennessee on August 14, 2005, and featured Tony Perkins and James Dobson. Miller criticized the United States Supreme Court, saying that it had "removed prayer from our public schools ... legalized the barbaric killing of unborn babies and it is ready to discard like an outdated hula hoop the universal institution of marriage between a man and a woman."

The Student Learning Center (SLC) at the University of Georgia was renamed to the Zell B. Miller Learning Center (Miller Learning Center or MLC for short) in October 2008.

Miller's health took a downward turn in the late 2000s when he developed Parkinson's disease and other health concerns, which ended in various complications. In 2016, Miller's grandson, Bryan Miller, started the Miller Institute Foundation as a way to preserve and promote his grandfather's legacy. By October 2017, Miller had officially retired from public life and was undergoing treatment for Parkinson's.

== Death ==
Miller died on March 23, 2018, at his home in Young Harris, Georgia, from complications of Parkinson's disease. His state funeral was held in Atlanta on March 28 with incumbent governor Nathan Deal, U.S. secretary of agriculture Sonny Perdue, U.S. senator Johnny Isakson, former senator Max Cleland, former lieutenant governor Pierre Howard and three former U.S. presidents—Jimmy Carter, Bill Clinton and George W. Bush—in attendance.

== Awards ==
- Miller received the Young Harris Medallion in 1978 from Young Harris College.
- In 1998, he received an honorary degree in Doctor of Laws from Oglethorpe University.

== Published works ==
- Miller, Zell (1976). Mountains Within Me.
- Miller, Zell (1983). Great Georgians. Larlin Corporation. ISBN 9993788627.
- Miller, Zell (1984). They Heard Georgia Singing: Great Georgians Vol 2.
- Miller, Zell (1997). Corps Values: Everything You Need to Know I Learned In the Marines. Longstreet Press, Incorporated. ISBN 1563523876.
- Miller, Zell (1998). "Listen to this Voice" Selected Speeches of Governor Zell Miller. Mercer University Press. ISBN 086554641X.
- Allen, Robert E. (1999). The First Battalion of the 28th Marines on Iwo Jima: A Day-By-Day History from Personal Accounts and Official Reports, With Complete Muster Rolls. McFarland. ISBN 0786405600. (foreword by Miller)
- Miller, Zell (2003). A National Party No More: The Conscience of a Conservative Democrat. Stroud & Hall Publishers. ISBN 0974537616.
- Parker, Dick (2003). What'll Ya Have: A History of the Varsity. Looking Glass. ISBN 1929619189. (foreword by Miller)
- Miller, Zell (2005). A Deficit Of Decency. Stroud & Hall. ISBN 0974537632.
- Zoller, Martha (2005). Indivisible: Uniting Values for a Divided America. Stroud & Hall. ISBN 0974537640. (foreword by Miller)
- Miller, Zell (2007). The Miracle of Brasstown Valley. Stroud & Hall. ISBN 978-0979646201.
- Miller, Zell (2009). Purt Nigh Gone: The Old Mountain Ways. Stroud & Hall. ISBN 978-0979646232.

== See also ==
- Conservative Democrat

Georgia State Senate
Preceded by Russell Ellis Cannon	Member of the Georgia State Senate from the 40th district 1961–1963	Succeeded by Dan I. MacIntyre, III
Preceded by Hamilton McWhorter Jr.	Member of the Georgia State Senate from the 50th district 1963–1965	Succeeded by Robert King Ballew
Political offices
Preceded by Lester Maddox	Lieutenant Governor of Georgia; January 14, 1975–January 14, 1991	Succeeded by Pierre Howard
Preceded by Joe Frank Harris	Governor of Georgia; January 14, 1991–January 11, 1999	Succeeded by Roy Barnes
Party political offices
Preceded by Lester Maddox	Democratic nominee for Lieutenant Governor of Georgia; 1974, 1978, 1982, 1986	Succeeded by Pierre Howard
Preceded by Joe Frank Harris	Democratic nominee for Governor of Georgia; 1990, 1994	Succeeded by Roy Barnes
Preceded by Ann Richards	Keynote Speaker of the Democratic National Convention; 1992; Served alongside: Bill Bradley, Barbara Jordan	Succeeded by Evan Bayh
Preceded by Michael Coles	Democratic nominee for U.S. Senator from Georgia (Class 3); 2000	Succeeded by Denise Majette
Preceded by John McCain; Colin Powell	Keynote Speaker of the Republican National Convention; 2004	Succeeded by Rudy Giuliani
U.S. Senate
Preceded by Paul Coverdell	U.S. Senator (Class 3) from Georgia; July 24, 2000–January 3, 2005; Served alongside: Max Cleland, Saxby Chambliss	Succeeded by Johnny Isakson
