= 2026 Georgia Labor Commissioner election =

- November 3, 2026
Candidate	Nikki Porcher	Bárbara Rivera Holmes
Party	Democratic	Republican
Popular vote	2,183,225	1,818,089
Percentage	54.56%	45.44%
- Porcher: 50–60% 60–70% 70–80% 80–90% Rivera Holmes: 50–60% 60–70% 70–80% 80–90% >90%
Labor Commissioner before election
Bárbara Rivera Holmes
Republican
Elected Labor Commissioner
Nikki Porcher
Democratic

The 2026 Georgia Labor Commissioner election was held on November 3, 2026, to elect the Georgia Labor Commissioner. Primary elections were held on May 19. Incumbent commissioner Bárbara Rivera Holmes ran for a first full four-year term, but lost the general election to Democratic nominee Nikki Porcher.

== Republican primary ==
Holmes was first appointed in March 2025 by Governor Brian Kemp. In April, she was sworn in and stated her intention to run for a full term in office.

=== Candidates ===
==== Nominee ====
- Bárbara Rivera Holmes, incumbent commissioner

=== Results ===
Republican primary
Party	Candidate	Votes	%
Republican	Bárbara Rivera Holmes (incumbent)	775,766	100.0
Total votes		775,766	100.0

== Democratic primary ==
=== Candidates ===
==== Nominee ====
- Nikki Porcher, entrepreneur

==== Eliminated in runoff ====
- Michelle Sanchez, community organizer

==== Eliminated in primary ====
- Brett Hulme, union advocate
- Jason Moon, former aide to U.S. Senator Max Cleland
- Christian Wise Smith, attorney and candidate for Fulton County district attorney in 2024

==== Withdrawn ====
- Clarence Blalock, political consultant and GIS analyst and candidate for Georgia's 14th congressional district in 2024 (previously ran for U.S. House, running for insurance commissioner)
- Anthony Robbins, private investigator and former Clayton County police investigator

=== Endorsements ===
Brett Hulme

Organizations

- Georgia AFL-CIO
- Georgia Equality

=== Results ===
Primary results by county: Porcher: 20–30%; 30–40%; 40–50%; Sanchez: 20–30%; 30–40%; Hulme: 20–30%; 30–40%; 40–50%; Smith: 20–30%; 30–40%

Democratic primary
Party	Candidate	Votes	%
Democratic	Nikki Porcher	311,244	30.8
Democratic	Michelle Sanchez	261,476	25.9
Democratic	Brett Hulme	200,118	19.8
Democratic	Christian Wise Smith	136,644	13.5
Democratic	Jason Moon	101,444	10.0
Total votes		1,010,926	100.0

=== Runoff ===
==== Debate ====
2026 Georgia Labor Commissioner Democratic primary runoff debate
No.	Date	Host	Moderator	Link	Democratic	Democratic
Key: P Participant A Absent N Not invited I Invited W Withdrawn						
Key: P Participant A Absent N Not invited I Invited W Withdrawn					Nikki Porcher	Michelle Sanchez
1	Jun. 1, 2026	Atlanta Press Club	Rick Folbaum	YouTube	P	P

==== Results ====
Runoff results by county: Porcher: 50–60%; 60–70%; 70–80%; >90%; Sanchez: 50–60%; 60–70%; Tie: 50–60%

Democratic primary runoff
Party	Candidate	Votes	%
Democratic	Nikki Porcher	232,518	61.7
Democratic	Michelle Sanchez	144,122	38.3
Total votes		376,640	100.0

== General election ==
=== Fundraising ===
Campaign finance reports as of June 17, 2026
Candidate	Raised	Spent	Cash on hand
Bárbara Rivera Holmes (R)	$333,113	$128,684	$199,313
Nikki Porcher (D)	$70,200	$51,165	$19,035
Source: Georgia State Ethics Commission

=== Results ===
2026 Georgia Labor Commissioner election
Party	Candidate	Votes	%	±%
Republican	Bárbara Rivera Holmes (incumbent)			
Democratic	Nikki Porcher			
Total votes			100.0	
