= Nikki Porcher =

American politician

Labor Commissioner-elect of Georgia
- Assuming office January 11, 2027
- Governor: Keisha Lance Bottoms (elect)
- Succeeding: Bárbara Rivera Holmes

Personal details
- Born: New Jersey, U.S.
- Party: Democratic
- Children: 1

Military service
- Allegiance: United States
- Branch/service: United States Air Force
- Battles/wars: War in Iraq; War in Afghanistan

Nikki Porcher is an American politician, U.S. Air Force veteran, and nonprofit founder who is the Georgia Commissioner of Labor-elect. A member of the Democratic Party, she was elected in November 2026, defeating incumbent Republican Bárbara Rivera Holmes.

Porcher is the founder of Buy From a Black Woman, a nonprofit organization and a former public school educator. She is the first Black woman elected to serve as Georgia's labor commissioner.

== Early life and education ==
Porcher was born in New Jersey and attended Burlington County Institute of Technology. She got her first job at the age of 16, working at Checkers where she worked for two years. Porcher later moved to Georgia, where she settled in the Atlanta area.

== Career ==
Porcher served in the United States Air Force for eight years. She was stationed at Robins Air Force Base in Georgia and completed deployments to Iraq and Afghanistan.

Following her military service, Porcher worked in community development, including housing and employment initiatives with Macon Area Habitat for Humanity. She later worked as a public school teacher in DeKalb County, Georgia. In 2016, Porcher founded Buy From a Black Woman, an Atlanta-based nonprofit organization. The organization provides educational programs, funding opportunities, events, and business resources, including an online directory.

Porcher ran in the 2026 Georgia Labor Commissioner election. She won the Democratic nomination in a June primary runoff against Michelle Sánchez. In the November 3, 2026, general election, Porcher defeated Republican incumbent Bárbara Rivera Holmes, receiving approximately 55% of the vote. She became the first Black woman elected Georgia labor commissioner and the first Democrat to win the office since Michael Thurmond left the position in 2011.

== Personal life ==
Porcher is a mother and has described herself as a single parent who raised a son in Georgia. She has spoken about the challenges of balancing work and parenthood, including the cost and availability of child care. As of 2026, Porcher lives in Southwest Atlanta.

== See also ==
- List of African-American statewide elected officials
- Timeline of African-American firsts
