= 2024 DeKalb County, Georgia Chief Executive Officer election =

- November 5, 2024
Candidate	Lorraine Cochran Johnson
Party	Democratic
Popular vote	320,572
Percentage	100.00%
CEO before election
Michael Thurmond
Democratic
Elected CEO
Lorraine Cochran Johnson
Democratic

The 2024 DeKalb County, Georgia Chief Executive Officer election took place on November 5, 2024. Incumbent CEO Michael Thurmond was term-limited and could not run for re-election to a third term. Three county commissioners—Steve Bradshaw, Lorraine Cochran Johnson, and Larry Johnson—ran to succeed him. Because Cochran Johnson and Johnson's terms on the County Commission would have overlapped with the CEO's term, they had to resign their seats upon qualifying.

In the Democratic primary, Cochran Johnson placed first, winning 46 percent of the vote, but because no candidate won a majority, a runoff election took place. Johnson placed second with 34 percent, beating out Bradshaw, who won 19 percent. Cochran Johnson won the runoff in a landslide, receiving 60 percent of the vote to Johnson's 40 percent. She faced no opponent in the general election and won uncontested, becoming the first woman to serve as CEO.

== Democratic primary ==
=== Candidates ===
- Lorraine Cochran Johnson, former County Commissioner
- Larry Johnson, former County Commissioner
- Steve Bradshaw, County Commissioner

=== Debate ===
2024 Dekalb County, Georgia Chief Executive Officer Democratic primary debate
No.	Date	Host	Moderator	Link	Democratic	Democratic	Democratic
Key: P Participant A Absent N Not invited I Invited W Withdrawn							
Key: P Participant A Absent N Not invited I Invited W Withdrawn					Steve Bradshaw	Lorraine Cochran Johnson	Larry Johnson
1	Apr. 28, 2024	Altanta Press Club; Georgia Public Broadcasting	Lisa Rayam	YouTube	P	P	P

=== Results ===
Democratic primary results
Party	Candidate	Votes	%
Democratic	Lorraine Cochran Johnson	36,511	46.29%
Democratic	Larry Johnson	27,090	34.34%
Democratic	Steve Bradshaw	15,276	19.37%
Total votes		78,877	100.00%

=== Runoff debate ===
2024 Dekalb County, Georgia Chief Executive Officer Democratic primary runoff debate
No.	Date	Host	Moderator	Link	Democratic	Democratic
Key: P Participant A Absent N Not invited I Invited W Withdrawn						
Key: P Participant A Absent N Not invited I Invited W Withdrawn					Lorraine Cochran Johnson	Larry Johnson
1	Jun. 9, 2024	Altanta Press Club; Georgia Public Broadcasting	Karyn Greer	YouTube	P	P

=== Runoff results ===
Democratic primary runoff results
Party	Candidate	Votes	%
Democratic	Lorraine Cochran Johnson	25,627	59.95%
Democratic	Larry Johnson	17,123	40.05%
Total votes		42,750	100.00%

== General election ==
=== Results ===
2024 DeKalb County, Georgia Chief Executive Officer election
Party	Candidate	Votes	%
Democratic	Lorraine Cochran Johnson	320,572	100.00%
Total votes		320,572	100.00%
Democratic hold			
