= 2020 DeKalb County, Georgia Chief Executive Officer election =

- November 3, 2020
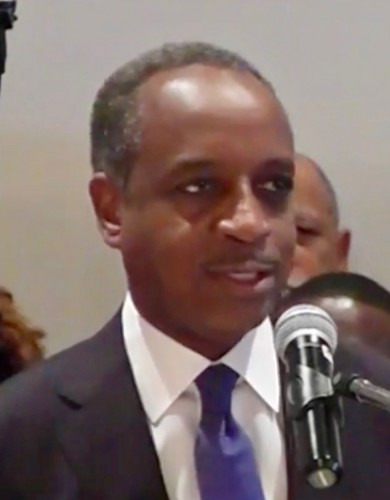
Candidate	Mike Thurmond
Party	Democratic
Popular vote	324,819
Percentage	99.38%
CEO before election
Mike Thurmond
Democratic
Elected CEO
Mike Thurmond
Democratic

The 2020 DeKalb County, Georgia Chief Executive Officer election took place on November 3, 2020. Incumbent CEO Mike Thurmond ran for re-election to a second term. Though Republicans in the Georgia General Assembly contemplated abolishing the position during Thurmond's first term, they ultimately did not do so.

No candidate filed to run against Thurmond in the primary or general elections, and he won his second term unopposed.

== Democratic primary ==
=== Candidates ===
- Mike Thurmond, incumbent CEO

=== Results ===
Democratic primary results
Party	Candidate	Votes	%
Democratic	Mike Thurmond (inc.)	146,189	100.00%
Total votes		146,189	100.00%

== General election ==
=== Results ===
2020 DeKalb County, Georgia Chief Executive Officer election
Party	Candidate	Votes	%
Democratic	Mike Thurmond (inc.)	324,819	99.38%
Write-in		2,018	0.62%
Total votes		326,837	100.00%
Democratic hold			
