= 2010 United States Senate election in Georgia =

- November 2, 2010
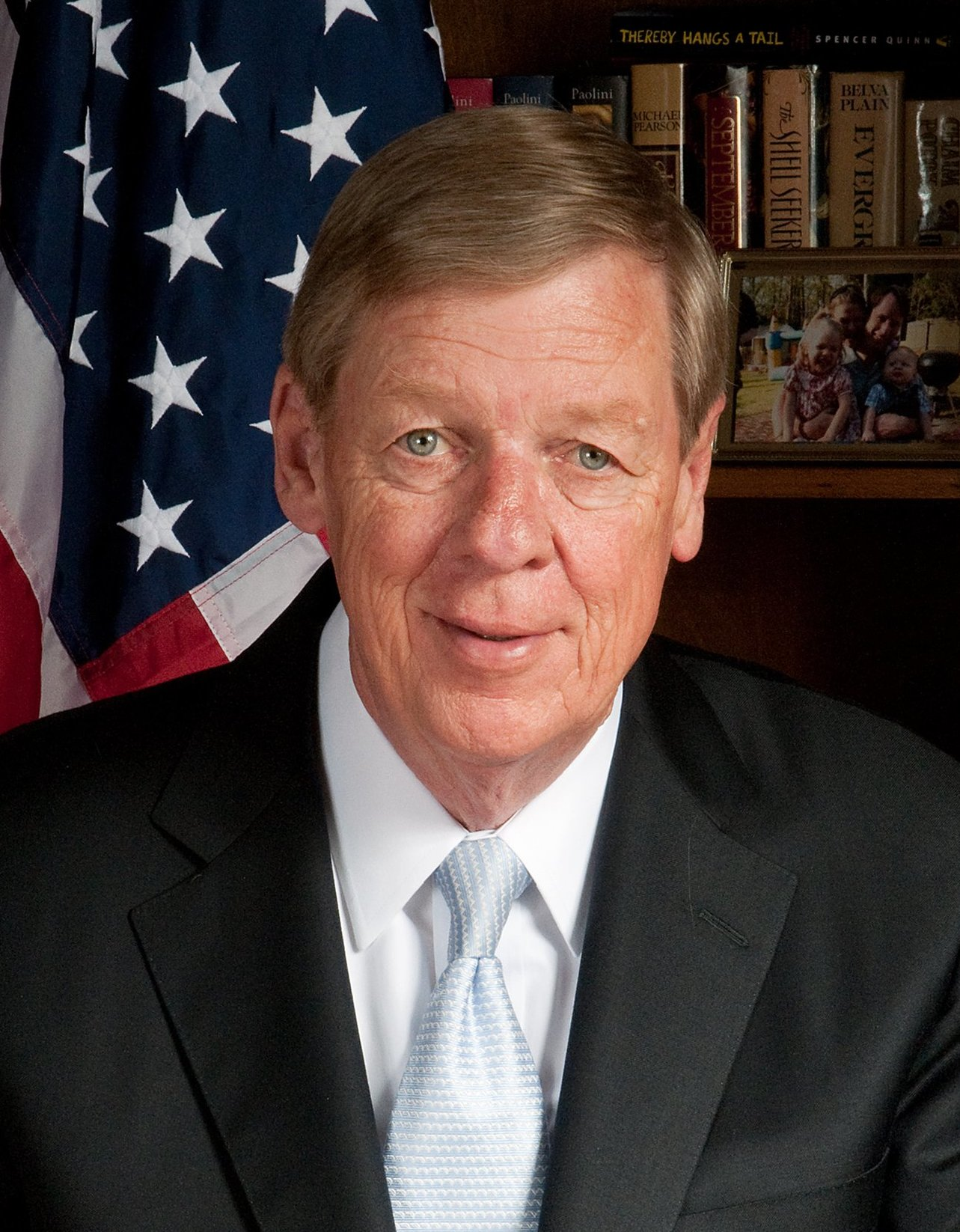

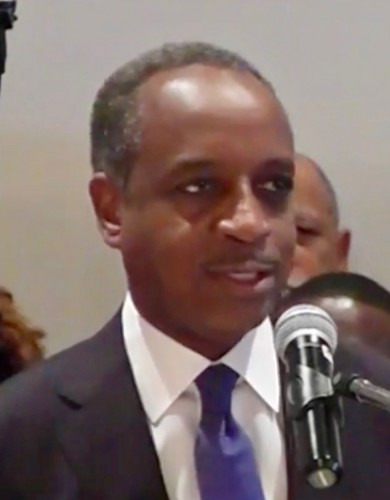
Nominee	Johnny Isakson	Mike Thurmond
Party	Republican	Democratic
Popular vote	1,489,904	996,516
Percentage	58.31%	39.00%
- Isakson: 40–50% 50–60% 60–70% 70–80% 80–90% >90% Thurmond: 40–50% 50–60% 60–70% 70–80% 80–90% >90% Tie: 40–50% 50% No data
U.S. senator before election
Johnny Isakson
Republican
Elected U.S. Senator
Johnny Isakson
Republican

The 2010 United States Senate election in Georgia took place on November 2, 2010. Incumbent Republican U.S. Senator Johnny Isakson won re-election to a second term.

== Democratic primary ==
=== Candidates ===
- RJ Hadley, chief of staff to the Rockdale County Commission
- Mike Thurmond, Commissioner of Labor

=== Polling ===
Poll source	Dates administered	Michael Thurmond	RJ Hadley	Undecided
Survey USA	June 14–17, 2010	68%	11%	22%
Survey USA	July 7–8, 2010	64%	13%	23%

=== Results ===
Democratic primary results
Party	Candidate	Votes	%
Democratic	Michael Thurmond	297,226	84.3%
Democratic	RJ Hadley	55,159	15.7%
Total votes		352,385	100.0%

== Republican primary ==
=== Candidates ===
- Johnny Isakson, incumbent Class III U.S. Senator

=== Results ===
Republican primary results
Party	Candidate	Votes	%
Republican	Johnny Isakson (incumbent)	558,298	100.00%
Total votes		558,298	100.00%

== General election ==
=== Candidates ===
- Chuck Donovan (L), airline pilot
- Johnny Isakson (R), incumbent Class III U.S. Senator
- Mike Thurmond (D), Commissioner of Labor

=== Campaign ===
Thurmond was the underdog in trying to become the first African-American to serve Georgia in the U.S. Senate. Thurmond claimed, "Polls are irrelevant. As everyone knows, the only poll that counts is the election on November 2." Isakson defended his record, saying, "Big business is not evil. If you didn't have big business, you wouldn't have jobs in America today." Despite the fact all political prognosticators classified the race as being safe for Isakson by August 20, he stated that Thurmond was a potentially formidable candidate, and that he would take nothing for granted.

=== Debates ===
- October 24

=== Predictions ===
Source	Ranking	As of
Cook Political Report	Solid R	October 26, 2010
Rothenberg	Safe R	October 22, 2010
RealClearPolitics	Safe R	October 26, 2010
Sabato's Crystal Ball	Safe R	October 21, 2010
CQ Politics	Safe R	October 26, 2010

=== Polling ===
Poll source	Dates administered	Johnny Isakson (R)	Michael Thurmond (D)	Chuck Donovan (L)	Other*	Undecided
Rasmussen Reports	April 22, 2010	51%	35%	––	––	––
Rasmussen Reports	May 20, 2010	57%	30%	––	6%	8%
Rasmussen Reports	August 11, 2010	55%	41%	––	2%	2%
Insider Advantage	August 17, 2010	47%	35%	7%	––	11%
Survey USA	September 10–12, 2010	56%	34%	6%	––	4%
Mason-Dixon	September 19, 2010	52%	33%	4%	––	11%
Rasmussen Reports	September 21, 2010	52%	36%	6%	––	6%
Insider Advantage	September 27, 2010	61%	29%	3%	––	7%
Rasmussen Reports	October 6, 2010	53%	38%	5%	1%	3%
SurveyUSA	October 21–24, 2010	58%	34%	5%	––	3%
Rasmussen Reports	October 24, 2010	59%	29%	5%	3%	4%
Mason-Dixon	October 26–28, 2010	56%	33%	4%	0%	7%

^{* Note: There is only one "other" candidate: Chuck Donovan.}

=== Fundraising ===
Candidate (party)	Receipts	Disbursements	Cash on hand	Debt
Johnny Isakson (R)	$5,943,285	$5,650,138	$2,588,284	$0
Michael Thurmond (D)	$288,666	$202,610	$86,055	$5,220
Source: Federal Election Commission

=== Results ===
United States Senate election in Georgia, 2010
Party	Candidate	Votes	%	±%
Republican	Johnny Isakson (incumbent)	1,489,904	58.31%	+0.43%
Democratic	Michael Thurmond	996,516	39.00%	−0.98%
Libertarian	Chuck Donovan	68,750	2.69%	+0.55%
Write-in		88	0.00%	N/A
Total votes		2,555,258	100.00%	
Republican hold				

==== Counties that flipped from Republican to Democratic ====
- Rockdale (largest town: Conyers)
- Terrell (largest city: Dawson)
- Bibb (largest city: Macon)
- Jefferson (largest city: Louisville)
- Warren (largest city: Warrenton)

==== Counties that flipped from Democratic to Republican ====
- Baker (largest city: Newton)

== See also ==
- List of United States senators from Georgia
