= Tom Murphy (Georgia politician) =

American politician (1924–2007)

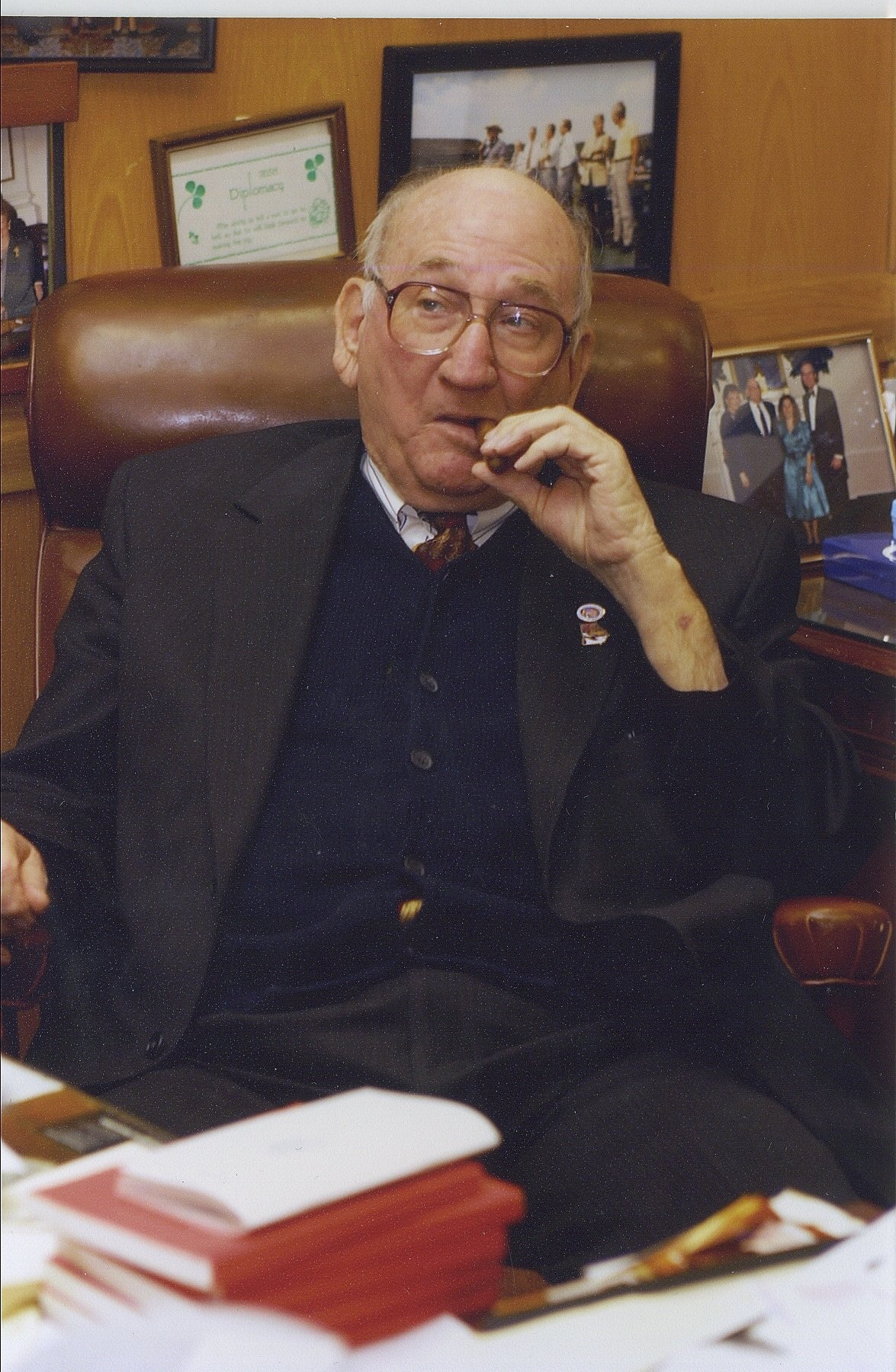

69th Speaker of the Georgia House of Representatives
- In office December 19, 1973 – January 13, 2003
- Governor: See list: Jimmy Carter George Busbee Joe Frank Harris Zell Miller Roy Barnes
- Preceded by: George L. Smith
- Succeeded by: Terry Coleman

Member of the Georgia House of Representatives
- In office January 9, 1961 – January 13, 2003
- Preceded by: Harold Lloyd Murphy
- Succeeded by: Bill Heath
- Constituency: Haralson County (1961–1966); 26th district (1966–1969); 19th district (1969–1973); 18th district (1973–2003)

Personal details
- Born: Thomas Bailey Murphy; March 10, 1924 Bremen, Georgia, U.S.
- Died: December 17, 2007 (aged 83) Bremen, Georgia, U.S.
- Party: Democratic
- Spouse: Agnes Bennett (m. 1946; died 1982)
- Children: 4
- Education: North Georgia College; University of Georgia (JD)

Military service
- Allegiance: United States
- Branch/service: United States Navy
- Years of service: 1941–1945
- Battles/wars: World War II

Thomas Bailey Murphy (March 10, 1924 – December 17, 2007) was an attorney and American politician from the U.S. state of Georgia. Murphy was the Speaker of the Georgia House of Representatives from 1973 until his defeat in the general election of 2002, making him the third longest serving House Speaker of any U.S. state legislature, behind only Michael Madigan of Illinois and Solomon Blatt of South Carolina. He was a member of the Democratic Party.

== Biography ==
Murphy was born in Bremen, Georgia, where his father was a telegraph operator for the railroad. Murphy graduated from Bremen High School in 1941 and enrolled in North Georgia College in Dahlonega, Georgia. During World War II Murphy served in the Navy in the South Pacific. After leaving the Navy Murphy attended the University of Georgia Law School, graduating in 1949. That same year he was elected to the Bremen Board of Education. He was elected to the Georgia House of Representatives in 1960, serving in both positions simultaneously until 1965 when he left the Board of Education.

From 1967 until 1970 Murphy was the House majority leader under Governor Lester Maddox. From 1970 to 1973 he was the Speaker pro tem of the House.

In December 1973, he was elected to the position of Speaker in the House of Representatives following the unexpected death of George L. Smith. He remained Speaker until his general election defeat in 2002. Murphy quickly rose to a position of unsurpassed influence in state government. He became so politically powerful during his speakership, that he is largely credited with helping his legislative protégé, Joe Frank Harris, get elected governor in 1982.

During his tenure, Murphy was a key figure in Georgia's economic development and throughout statewide politics; and was considered by many to be the best friend Atlanta ever had in the legislature despite his rural residency and upbringing.

In 2000 political columnist Bill Shipp wrote of Murphy, "In his 26 years as presiding officer of the House, he has become as powerful and important in the General Assembly as the governor." Murphy's brusque manners could be off putting, and often required the more diplomatic intervention of his speaker pro tempore, Jack Connell. U.S. District Judge Dudley Bowen Jr observed that Tom Murphy was a powerhouse, and he was an administration unto himself. And Connell knew how to be nice to people. Connell knew how to work with people.

=== Reapportionment and downfall ===
Fiercely partisan, Murphy described himself as a "yellow dog" Democrat, or one who would rather vote for a yellow dog than vote for a Republican. U.S. Representative Lynn Westmoreland, who served in the state house from 1993 to 2005–the last four years as minority leader–put it bluntly: "Tom Murphy wasn't fair, he wasn't bipartisan and he didn't light up a room with his smile."

In 1991 and 2001 Murphy presided over the reapportionment process which redrew congressional and legislative lines. The resulting district maps were criticized as pro-Democratic gerrymanders. Murphy acted to redraw the congressional seats of high-profile Republicans Newt Gingrich (1991), and Bob Barr (2001), in what was viewed as typical of his "hardball" application of political power. Gingrich, remarked that "The Speaker, by raising money and gerrymandering, has sincerely dedicated a part of his career to wiping me out."

Murphy frequently skated to reelection, but faced increasingly competitive races from the late 1980s onward as Atlanta's suburbs began bleeding into his district. Indeed, Republican candidates began winning up and down the ballot in the district during this time. In 2000, he faced his closest race yet against Republican Bill Heath. Murphy only held on by 505 votes, a margin of less than two percentage points.

Gerrymandering ultimately proved to be Murphy's downfall. The contorted districts that resulted from the 2001 remap both confused and angered voters, and is believed to have led to Murphy losing his own seat in 2002 in a rematch against Heath.

Shortly after the controversial 2001 reapportionment process, and Murphy's own political defeat, political power shifted in favor of the Republicans, who gained control of both chambers of the Legislature, the Governor's office, and the majority of statewide elected offices. A number of Murphy's lieutenants, including Lauren "Bubba" McDonald and Reapportionment committee Chairman Bob Hanner, who was Murphy's point man on efforts to re-draw district lines to favor Democrats, left the Democratic Party and joined with their former political rivals when power shifted to the Republicans.

== Personal life ==
Murphy married Agnes Bennett in 1946. She died in 1982. They had four children together.

In May 2004, Murphy's grandson M. Chad Long, a lobbyist, and four others including former State Representative Robin L. Williams and former Atlanta Braves player Rick Camp were indicted on charges that they stole more than $2 million from the Community Mental Health Center of East Central Georgia. In 2005, in U.S. District Court, Williams was convicted on 17 counts related to conspiracy, bribery, theft, health care fraud and money laundering, while the others were convicted on fewer counts. Long was found guilty of conspiracy and health-care fraud. All were sentenced to federal prison terms. Williams was sentenced to 10 years in federal prison, Camp received a sentence of 37 months, and Long received a shorter sentence. The group, except Long, appealed their convictions, but in March 2007 the appeal was turned down. A three-judge panel of the 11th U.S. Circuit Court of Appeals said in an unsigned decision that it found no merit to any of the arguments.

== Death and legacy ==
Murphy suffered a stroke in 2004, which left him incapacitated. He died at 10:00 p.m. on December 17, 2007, in Bremen after years of declining health. To honor his service to Georgia, Murphy lay in state at the Georgia State Capitol on December 21, 2007—first within the House chambers and then in the Capitol Rotunda.

When Murphy died, Georgia Republican U. S. Senator Johnny Isakson said, "Tom Murphy was a giant in Georgia politics, and his legacy is everywhere. Without Tom Murphy there would be no World Congress Center, or Georgia Dome or MARTA." Isakson went on to say, "As tough as he was on the outside, he had a soft spot in his heart for children, the poor and the sick. He was a product of the Depression and it left a lasting impression on him. In many a speech Speaker Murphy would reflect on the days of his youth and would vow never to let a Georgia child face the conditions he did."

== See also ==
- List of speakers of the Georgia House of Representatives

Georgia House of Representatives
Preceded by Harold Lloyd Murphy	Member of the Georgia House of Representatives from the Haralson County district 1961–1966	Succeeded by Constituency abolished
Preceded by Constituency established	Member of the Georgia House of Representatives from the 26th district 1966–1969	Succeeded by Ben B. Ross
Preceded by Harry Magoon	Member of the Georgia House of Representatives from the 19th district, Post 1; 1969–1973	Succeeded by Joe Mack Wilson
Preceded by Jack Adrian Wheeler, Sr.	Member of the Georgia House of Representatives from the 18th district 1973–2003	Succeeded by Bill Heath
Political offices
Preceded by George L. Smith	Speaker of the Georgia House of Representatives; 1973–2003	Succeeded by Terry Coleman
