= Al Scott (politician) =

American retired politician and businessman (born 1947)

Chair of the Chatham County Board of Commissioners
- In office January 4, 2013 – January 2, 2021
- Preceded by: Pete Liakakis
- Succeeded by: Chester Ellis

5th Labor Commissioner of Georgia
- In office 1991–1992
- Appointed by: Zell Miller
- Preceded by: Ray Hollingsworth
- Succeeded by: David Poythress

Member of the Georgia State Senate from the 2nd district
- In office January 10, 1983 – January 14, 1991
- Preceded by: Charles Wessels
- Succeeded by: Roy Allen

Member of the Georgia House of Representatives from the 123rd district
- In office January 10, 1977 – January 10, 1983
- Preceded by: Jesse Blackshear
- Succeeded by: Diane Johnson

Personal details
- Born: Albert Jerome Scott; January 1, 1947 (age 79) Springfield, Georgia, U.S.
- Party: Democratic
- Education: Armstrong State University

Military service
- Allegiance: United States
- Branch/service: United States Army
- Years of service: 1966–1968

Albert Jerome Scott (born January 1, 1947) is an American retired politician and businessman who served as Commissioner of the Georgia Department of Labor from 1991 to 1992. He was the African American to hold a non-judicial Constitutional Office in Georgia history. He also served in the Georgia General Assembly from 1977 to 1991 as a member of the Democratic Party, representing Chatham County.

== Life and career ==
Born and raised in poverty in Savannah, Georgia, Scott attended Beach High School and Armstrong State University. He deployed to Korea after being drafted into the U.S. Army. He worked for the Union Camp Corporation from 1968 to 1990 and again from 1993 to 2006, rising to executive roles.

Scott represented District 123 in the Georgia House of Representatives from 1976 to 1982 and represented the 2nd District of the Georgia State Senate from 1982 to 1990, becoming the first African American elected to the Senate from Chatham County. Considered a pro-business moderate Democrat, Scott served on the House Reapportionment Committee, sponsored bills requiring mortgage companies to pay interest on escrow accounts, and advanced efforts to establish the Georgia Children's Trust Fund.

In 1990, Governor Zell Miller appointed Scott to the office of Labor Commissioner, in which he served from 1991 to 1992. As Commissioner, Scott held taxes and fees steady and secured passage of the first major revision to Georgia's employment security law in fifty years. Former Georgia Secretary of State David Poythress defeated Scott in the Democratic primary and went on to win the 1992 general election.

In 2012, Scott was elected chair of the Chatham County Commissioners, becoming the first African American to hold this office. He was reelected in 2016 but opted not to run for a third term in 2020. He led the Savannah branch of the NAACP for many years.

He also served on the board of directors of the Georgia Ports Authority, the State Board of Education, the BB&T Bank Community Board, the Southern State Energy Board, the Boy Scouts of America, and Hospice Savannah.
