= 2024 Fulton County elections =

2024 Georgia local election

- November 5, 2024

A general election was held in Fulton County, Georgia on November 5, 2024, to elect various county-level positions. The primary election was held on May 21, 2024.

== District Attorney ==
=== Democratic primary ===
==== Candidates ====
===== Nominee =====
- Fani Willis, incumbent district attorney

===== Eliminated in primary =====
- Christian Wise Smith, former Atlanta city solicitor

==== Results ====
Democratic primary
Party	Candidate	Votes	%
Democratic	Fani Willis (incumbent)	78,101	86.99
Democratic	Christian Wise Smith	11,684	13.01
Total votes		89,785	100.00

=== Republican primary ===
==== Candidates ====
===== Nominee =====
- Courtney Kramer, lawyer

==== Results ====
Republican primary
Party	Candidate	Votes	%
Republican	Courtney Kramer	18,180	100.00
Total votes		18,180	100.00

=== General election ===
==== Results ====
2024 Fulton County District Attorney election
Party	Candidate	Votes	%
Democratic	Fani Willis (incumbent)	355,894	68.14
Republican	Courtney Kramer	166,427	31.86
Total votes		522,321	100.00

== Sheriff ==
=== Democratic primary ===
==== Candidates ====
===== Nominee =====
- Patrick Labat, incumbent sheriff

===== Eliminated in primary =====
- Kirt Beasley, law enforcement employee
- James Brown, former law enforcement officer
- Joyce Farmer, law enforcement officer

==== Results ====
Democratic primary
Party	Candidate	Votes	%
Democratic	Patrick Labat (incumbent)	46,781	54.20
Democratic	Joyce Farmer	19,708	22.83
Democratic	Kirt Beasley	10,009	11.60
Democratic	James Brown	9,838	11.38
Total votes		86,336	100.00

=== General election ===
==== Results ====
General election
Party	Candidate	Votes	%
Democratic	Patrick Labat (incumbent)	435,304	100.00
Total votes		435,304	100.00

== Solicitor General ==
=== Democratic primary ===
==== Candidates ====
===== Nominee =====
- Keith Gammage, incumbent solicitor general

==== Results ====
Democratic primary
Party	Candidate	Votes	%
Democratic	Keith Gammage (incumbent)	76,534	100.00
Total votes		76,534	100.00

=== General election ===
==== Results ====
General election
Party	Candidate	Votes	%
Democratic	Keith Gammage (incumbent)	436,036	100.00
Total votes		436,036	100.00

== Clerk of Superior Court ==
=== Democratic primary ===
==== Candidates ====
===== Nominee =====
- Ché Alexander, incumbent clerk

===== Eliminated in primary =====
- Rodney Fowler
- Joe Hughes
- Keisha Sean Waites, former at-large Atlanta City councilor and former state representative

==== Results ====
Democratic primary
Party	Candidate	Votes	%
Democratic	Ché Alexander (incumbent)	44,810	52.09
Democratic	Keisha Sean Waites	28,305	32.91
Democratic	Joe Hughes	8,737	10.16
Democratic	Rodney Fowler	4,176	4.84
Total votes		86,028	100.00

=== General election ===
==== Results ====
General election
Party	Candidate	Votes	%
Democratic	Ché Alexander (incumbent)	435,766	100.00
Total votes		435,766	100.00

== Surveyor ==
=== Democratic primary ===
==== Candidates ====
===== Nominee =====
- Fred Quinn

==== Results ====
Democratic primary
Party	Candidate	Votes	%
Democratic	Fred Quinn	75,934	100.00
Total votes		75,934	100.00

=== General election ===
==== Results ====
General election
Party	Candidate	Votes	%
Democratic	Fred Quinn	436,159	100.00
Total votes		436,159	100.00

== Tax Commissioner ==
=== Democratic primary ===
==== Candidates ====
===== Nominee =====
- Arthur Ferdinand, incumbent tax commissioner

===== Eliminated in primary =====
- Duvwon Robinson, former government official

==== Results ====
Democratic primary
Party	Candidate	Votes	%
Democratic	Arthur Ferdinand (incumbent)	57,944	67.43
Democratic	Duvwon Robinson	27,978	32.57
Total votes		85,922	100.00

=== General election ===
==== Results ====
General election
Party	Candidate	Votes	%
Democratic	Arthur Ferdinand (incumbent)	438,191	100.00
Total votes		438,191	100.00

== Board of Commissioners ==
=== District 2 ===
==== Candidates ====
===== Nominee =====
- Bob Ellis, incumbent commissioner

===== Results =====
Republican primary
Party	Candidate	Votes	%
Republican	Bob Ellis (incumbent)	6,663	100.00
Total votes		6,663	100.00

==== Democratic primary ====
===== Candidates =====
====== Nominee ======
- Megan Harris, financial employee

====== Eliminated in primary ======
- Jennifer Phillippi, business executive

===== Results =====
Democratic primary
Party	Candidate	Votes	%
Democratic	Megan Harris	4,277	57.22
Democratic	Jennifer Phillippi	3,195	42.78
Total votes		7,472	100.00

==== General election ====
===== Results =====
General election
Party	Candidate	Votes	%
Republican	Bob Ellis (incumbent)	51,289	54.53
Democratic	Megan Harris	42,743	45.47
Total votes		94,032	100.00

=== District 4 ===
==== Democratic primary ====
===== Candidates =====
====== Nominee ======
- Mo Ivory, Georgia State University professor

====== Eliminated in runoff ======
- Natalie Hall, incumbent commissioner

====== Eliminated in primary ======
- Sonya Russell-Ofchus

===== Results =====
Democratic primary
Party	Candidate	Votes	%
Democratic	Natalie Hall (incumbent)	6,667	41.64
Democratic	Mo Ivory	6,511	40.66
Democratic	Sonya Russell-Ofchus	2,857	17.70
Total votes		16,035	100.00

===== Runoff =====
====== Results ======
Democratic primary runoff
Party	Candidate	Votes	%
Democratic	Mo Ivory	3,713	77.00
Democratic	Natalie Hall (incumbent)	1,107	23.00
Total votes		4,820	100.00

==== General election ====
===== Results =====
General election
Party	Candidate	Votes	%
Democratic	Mo Ivory	74,873	100.00
Total votes		74,873	100.00

=== District 6 ===
==== Democratic primary ====
===== Candidates =====
====== Nominee ======
- Khadijah Abdur-Rahman, incumbent commissioner

====== Eliminated in primary ======
- Ciara Anderson
- Ali Carter

===== Results =====
Democratic primary
Party	Candidate	Votes	%
Democratic	Khadijah Abdur-Rahman (incumbent)	10,848	55.22
Democratic	Ali Carter	5,482	27.89
Democratic	Ciara Anderson	3,333	16.99
Total votes		19,663	100.00

==== General election ====
===== Results =====
General election
Party	Candidate	Votes	%
Democratic	Khadijah Abdur-Rahman (incumbent)	72,481	100.00
Total votes		72,481	100.00
