= Mark Butler (Georgia politician) =

American politician

Labor Commissioner of Georgia
- In office January 10, 2011 – January 12, 2023
- Governor: Nathan Deal; Brian Kemp
- Preceded by: Mike Thurmond
- Succeeded by: Bruce Thompson

Member of the Georgia House of Representatives from the 18th district
- In office January 2005 – January 2011
- Preceded by: Bill Heath
- Succeeded by: Kevin Cooke

Personal details
- Born: July 21, 1970 (age 56) Carrollton, Georgia, U.S.
- Party: Republican
- Children: 3
- Education: Auburn University (BA)

J. Mark Butler (born July 21, 1970) is an American politician who served as the Georgia Labor Commissioner. He became the first Republican to hold the office with his election in 2010, in which Republicans won every statewide office in Georgia. Prior to serving as Commissioner of Labor, Butler served in the Georgia House of Representatives for District 18. He was re-elected Labor Commissioner in 2014 and 2018. His term expired in January 2023.

Party political offices
Preceded by Brent Brown	Republican nominee for Labor Commissioner of Georgia; 2010, 2014, 2018	Succeeded by Bruce Thompson
Political offices
Preceded by Mike Thurmond	Labor Commissioner of Georgia; 2011–2023	Succeeded by Bruce Thompson
