= Bárbara Rivera Holmes =

American politician

Labor Commissioner of Georgia
- Incumbent
- Assumed office April 4, 2025
- Governor: Brian Kemp
- Preceded by: Louis DeBroux (acting)

Personal details
- Born: 1979 or 1980 (age 46–47) San Juan, Puerto Rico
- Party: Republican
- Education: Florida Southern College (BA)
- Website: Office website Campaign website

Bárbara Rivera Holmes (born 1979/1980) is an American politician from Georgia. She is the Georgia Labor Commissioner.

Holmes was born in San Juan, Puerto Rico. She earned a bachelor's degree from Florida Southern College. She moved to Georgia and worked for The Albany Herald as a journalist before becoming the leader of the area's chamber of commerce in 2016. Governor Nathan Deal appointed Holmes to the Georgia Board of Regents in 2017.

Following the death of Georgia Labor Commissioner Bruce Thompson in late 2024, Governor Brian Kemp announced that he would appoint Holmes to be the labor commissioner on March 18, 2025. She was sworn in on April 4 and ran for election to a full term in 2026 as a Republican. In the November 3, 2026 general election, Holmes lost her bid for a full term to Democratic nominee Nikki Porcher.

Political offices
Preceded by Louis DeBroux; Acting	Labor Commissioner of Georgia; 2025–present	Incumbent
