= Johnny Isakson =

American politician (1944–2021)

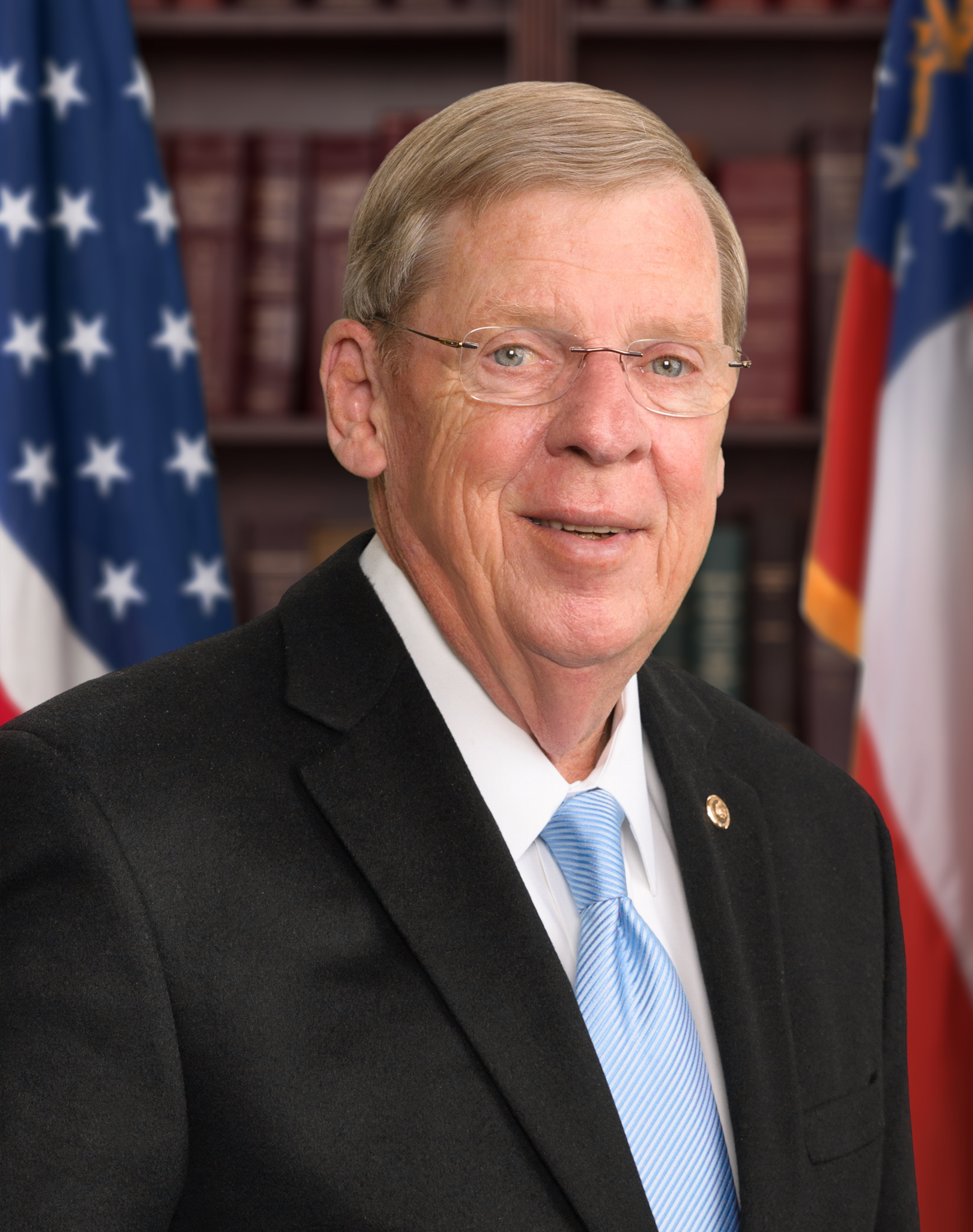
- Official portrait, 2014

United States Senator from Georgia
- In office January 3, 2005 – December 31, 2019
- Preceded by: Zell Miller
- Succeeded by: Kelly Loeffler
Senate positions
Chair of the Senate Veterans Affairs Committee
In office January 3, 2015 – December 19, 2019
Preceded by	Bernie Sanders
Succeeded by	Jerry Moran
Chair of the Senate Ethics Committee
In office January 3, 2015 – December 19, 2019
Preceded by	Barbara Boxer
Succeeded by	James Lankford
Ranking Member of the Senate Ethics Committee
In office January 3, 2009 – January 3, 2015
Preceded by	John Cornyn
Succeeded by	Barbara Boxer

Member of the U.S. House of Representatives from Georgia's 6th district
- In office February 23, 1999 – January 3, 2005 (Note: Isakson's official service begins on the date of the special election, while he was not sworn in until February 25, 1999.)
- Preceded by: Newt Gingrich
- Succeeded by: Tom Price

Member of the Georgia State Senate from the 21st district
- In office January 11, 1993 – January 6, 1997
- Preceded by: William F. English
- Succeeded by: Robert Lamutt

Member of the Georgia House of Representatives
- In office January 10, 1977 – January 11, 1991
- Preceded by: Charles W. Edwards
- Succeeded by: Lynda Coker
- Constituency: 20-Post 1 (1977–1983); 21-Post 2 (1983–1991)
Georgia House positions
Minority Leader of the Georgia House of Representatives
In office January 10, 1983 – January 11, 1991
Preceded by	Herbert Jones Jr.
Succeeded by	Paul Heard

Personal details
- Born: John Hardy Isakson; December 28, 1944 Atlanta, Georgia, U.S.
- Died: December 19, 2021 (aged 76) Atlanta, Georgia, U.S.
- Party: Republican
- Spouse: Dianne Davison (m. 1968)
- Children: 3
- Education: University of Georgia (BBA)

Military service
- Branch/service: United States Air Force
- Years of service: 1966–1972
- Rank: Staff Sergeant
- Unit: Georgia Air National Guard
- Isakson's voice Isakson honors Georgian businessman and political operative T. Rogers Wade; Recorded February 15, 2011

John Hardy Isakson (December 28, 1944 – December 19, 2021) was an American businessman and politician who served as a United States senator from Georgia from 2005 until his resignation in 2019 following health concerns. A member of the Republican Party, he previously served in the Georgia legislature and the United States House of Representatives.

Born in Atlanta, Georgia, Isakson served in the Georgia Air National Guard (1966–1972) and graduated from the University of Georgia. He opened a real estate branch for Northside Realty and later served 22 years as the company's president. After a failed bid for the Georgia House of Representatives in 1974, he was elected in 1976. He served seven terms, including four as minority leader. Isakson was the Republican candidate for governor of Georgia in 1990, but lost. Two years later, he was elected to the Georgia Senate and served one term. He unsuccessfully ran in the Republican primary in the 1996 U.S. Senate election.

After 6th District Congressman and Speaker of the House Newt Gingrich resigned, Isakson ran in the February 1999 special election to succeed him, winning by a 40-point margin. He ran for the U.S. Senate in 2004 after Democratic incumbent Zell Miller opted not to run for re-election. With the backing of much of Georgia's Republican establishment, he won both the primary and general elections by wide margins. He became the senior senator from Georgia when Saxby Chambliss retired in 2015. On December 31, 2019, midway through his third Senate term, Isakson resigned from the Senate due to health concerns and was succeeded by fellow Republican Kelly Loeffler who was appointed by Brian Kemp, the Republican Governor of Georgia, to fill the vacant seat. He died two years later on December 19, 2021.

== Early life, education, and real estate career ==
Isakson was born on December 28, 1944, in Atlanta, Georgia, the son of Julia (née Baker) and Edwin Andrew Isakson, a Greyhound bus driver, who later established an Atlanta real estate firm. His paternal grandparents were of Swedish descent, and his paternal grandfather was born in Östersund. His mother was of mostly British ancestry, and her family has been in the American South since the colonial era.

Isakson served in the Georgia Air National Guard from 1966 to 1972, leaving service as a staff sergeant. Isakson enrolled at the University of Georgia, where he became a member of the Sigma Alpha Epsilon social fraternity. Shortly after graduating from UGA, he opened the first Cobb County office of Northside Realty, a prominent Atlanta-area real estate firm that his father, Ed, helped to establish. Isakson became company president in 1979, a post he held for 22 years, during which Northside became the biggest independent real estate company in the Southeast and one of the largest in the United States.

== Early political career (1974–1998) ==
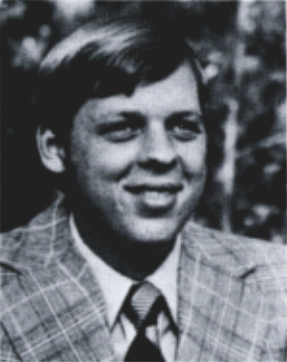
Isakson as a state representative in 1977

=== Georgia House of Representatives ===
In 1974, Isakson first ran for the Georgia House of Representatives in an eastern Cobb County district and lost. He ran again in 1976 and won. He served seven terms in the House. He won re-election unopposed in 1984 and 1988. In his last four terms (1983–1990), he was the Republican Minority leader. In 1988 and 1996, he was co-chair for U.S. Senator Bob Dole's presidential primary campaigns.

=== 1990 gubernatorial election ===
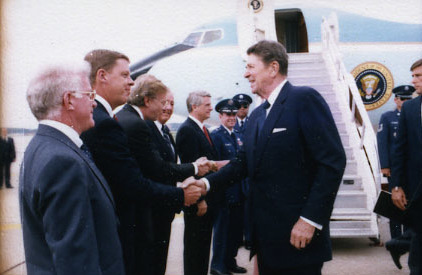
Isakson greeting President Ronald Reagan in 1986

Isakson was the Republican candidate for Governor of Georgia in 1990. He won the Republican primary with 74% of the vote in a four candidate field. In the general election, he was defeated by Democratic Lieutenant Governor Zell Miller 53%–45%. His campaign was managed by Jay Morgan while Miller's campaign was managed by James Carville. Miller ran on a pledge to start a state lottery and use the revenue for public schools. Isakson proposed a ballot referendum on the lottery.

=== Georgia Senate ===
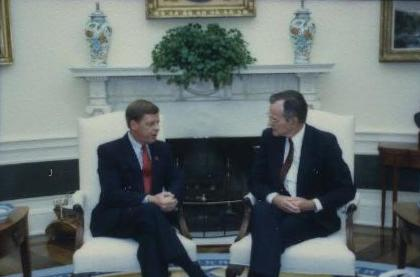
Isakson with President George H. W. Bush in 1990

In 1992, Isakson was elected to the Georgia Senate.

=== 1996 U.S. Senate election ===
In 1996, Isakson ran in the Republican primary for the U.S. Senate seat being vacated by retiring Democratic U.S. Senator Sam Nunn. During his campaign, Isakson expressed his support for abortion rights in a campaign advertisement. Isakson finished second in the primary election with 35% of the vote, but the winner Guy Millner, a millionaire businessman, failed to get a majority of the vote (receiving only 42%). Therefore, per Georgia law, he was forced into a primary runoff election. Millner defeated Isakson in the runoff 53%–47%. Millner lost the general election to Democrat Max Cleland.

In December 1996, Isakson was appointed head of the State Board of Education by Gov. Zell Miller.

== U.S. House of Representatives (1999–2005) ==
=== Elections ===
1999

In November 1998, 6th District U.S. Congressman and Speaker of the House Newt Gingrich faced a revolt in his caucus after the Republicans lost five seats in the midterm elections. Amid the turmoil, Gingrich announced on Friday after the Tuesday elections not only that he would not run for a third term as Speaker, but he would also not take his seat for an eleventh term beginning in January 1999. Isakson ran for the seat in a special election in February. He won the election with 65% of the vote, forty points ahead of the second-place finisher Christina Fawcett Jeffrey.

2000

Isakson won re-election to his first full term with 74.75% of the vote.

2002

Isakson won re-election to his second full term with 79.87% of the vote.

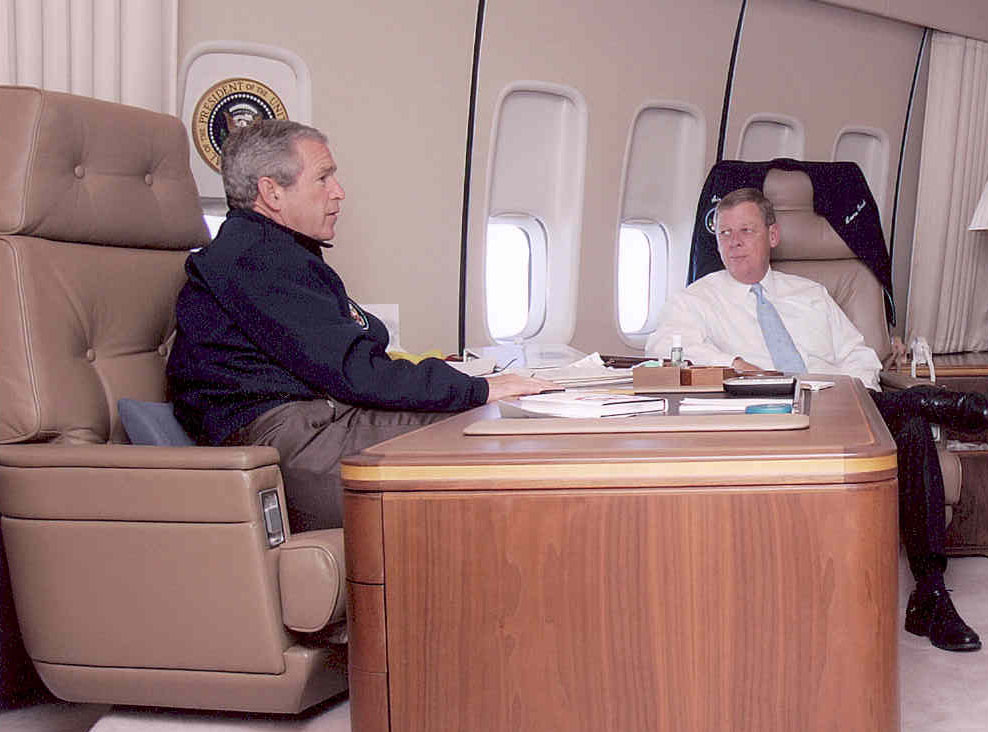
President George W. Bush and Senator Isakson aboard Air Force One in 2005.

=== Tenure ===
During his tenure in the House of Representatives, Isakson served on the Committee on Education and the Workforce, aiding President Bush in passing the No Child Left Behind Act. As a Representative, Isakson sponsored 27 bills. He was a member of the U.S. House Education Committee. In October 2002, Isakson voted in favor of the authorization of force against the country of Iraq.

== U.S. Senate (2005–2019) ==
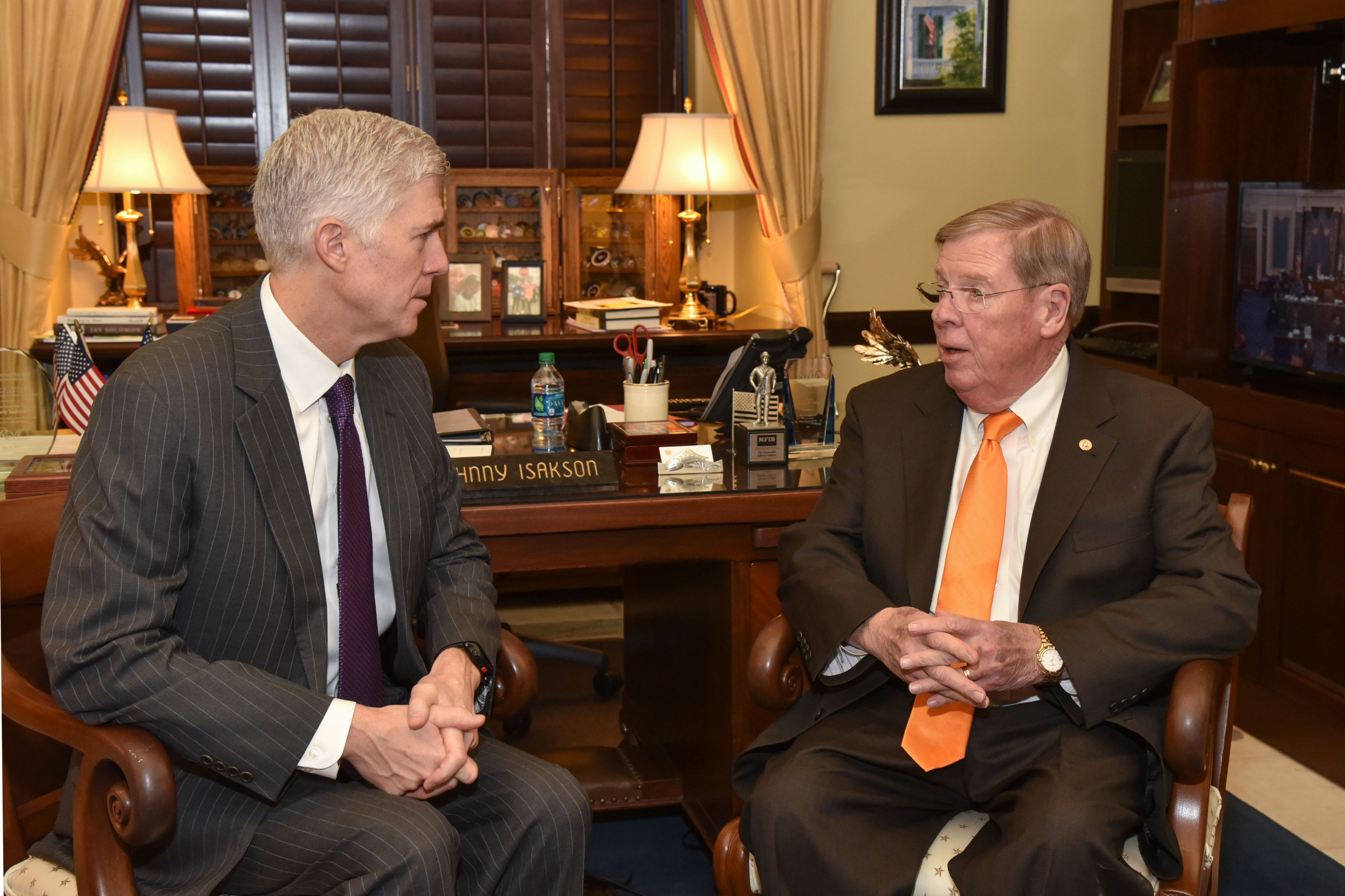
Isakson with Neil Gorsuch in 2017

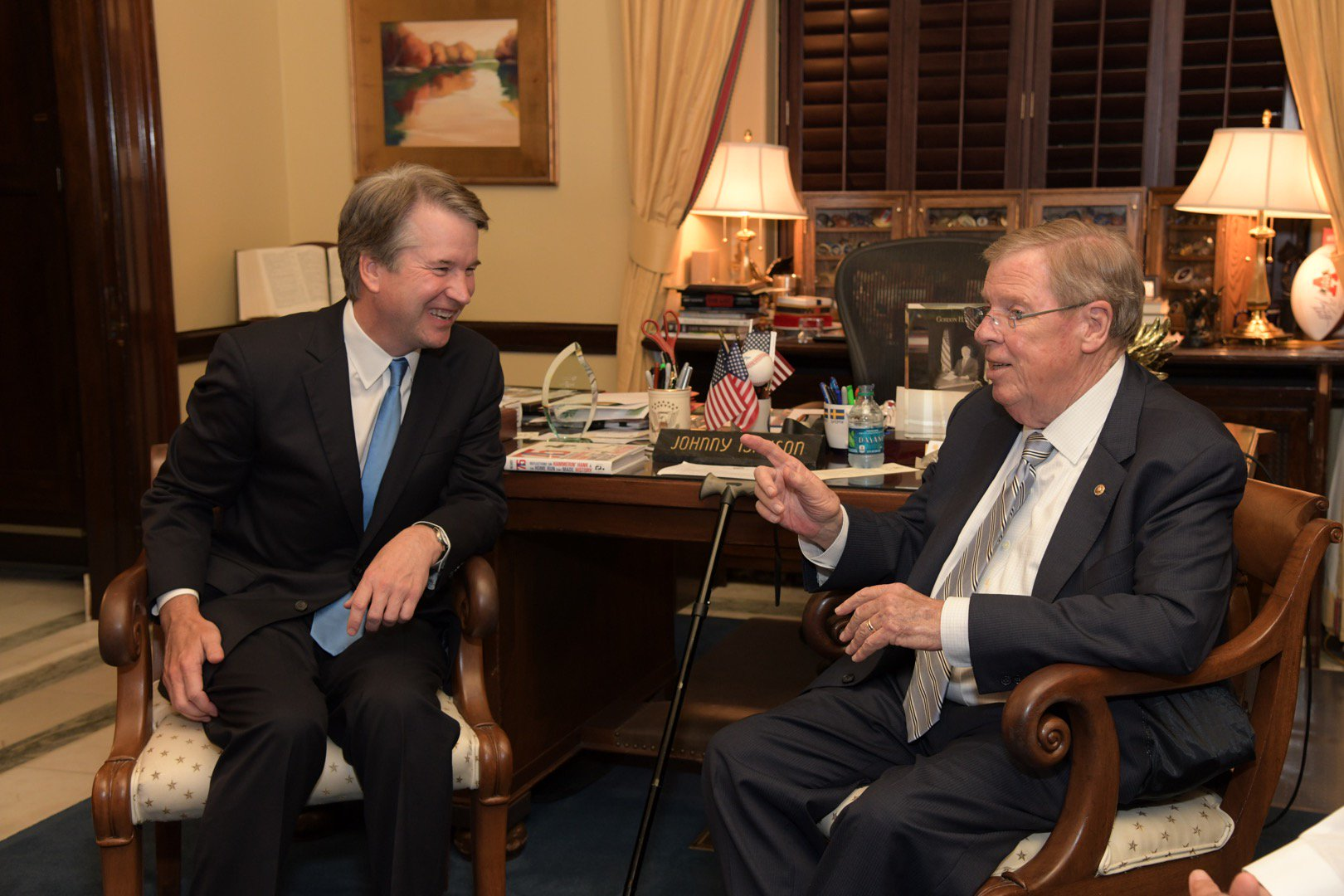
Isakson with Brett Kavanaugh in 2018

=== Elections ===
==== 2004 ====
In early 2003, conservative Democratic U.S. Senator Zell Miller—who had been appointed to fill out the term of the late Republican Senator Paul Coverdell and elected to the post in his own right in 2000—declared his intention not to run for a full term in the Senate in 2004. Isakson immediately entered the race. He faced 8th District U.S. Congressman Mac Collins and businessman Herman Cain in the primary.

It was initially thought Isakson would face a difficult primary since many socially conservative Republicans still felt chagrin at Isakson's declared support for abortion rights in 1990. However, he won the Republican primary with 53%, with Cain a distant second and Collins third, averting the need for a runoff. In the general election, he easily defeated the Democratic candidate, 4th District Congresswoman Denise Majette, by 18 points. Isakson's election marked the first time in Georgia's history that both of the state's U.S. Senate seats had been held by Republicans, as Saxby Chambliss had won the other seat by defeating Nunn's successor, Max Cleland, two years earlier.

==== 2010 ====
In 2010, Isakson was unopposed in the primary. He won re-election with 58.3% of the vote in 2010, defeating State Commissioner of Labor Mike Thurmond.

==== 2016 ====
Isakson was re-elected to a third term in 2016 with 54.8% of the vote.

=== Tenure and legislation ===
As a senator, Isakson sponsored or co-sponsored 130 bills, just 8 of which became law.

In 2010, Isakson apologized for referring to voters as "the unwashed" in off-hand comments, saying he "didn't mean anything derogatory by it."

Isakson resigned from the Senate for health reasons on December 31, 2019. He is the longest serving Republican senator in the history of Georgia.

=== Committee assignments ===
- Committee on Finance
  - Subcommittee on International Trade, Customs and Global Competitiveness
  - Subcommittee on Social Security, Pensions and Family Policy
  - Subcommittee on Taxation and IRS Oversight
- Committee on Health, Education, Labor, and Pensions
  - Subcommittee on Employment and Workplace Safety (chairman)
- Committee on Veterans' Affairs (chairman)
- Select Committee on Ethics (chairman)
- Committee on Foreign Relations
  - Subcommittee on African Affairs
  - Subcommittee on East Asian and Pacific Affairs

== Political positions ==
When compared to his Republican peers in the Senate, Isakson was close to center of his party; he was neither significantly more conservative nor liberal than his peers.

=== Abortion ===
During his U.S. Senate campaign in 1996, Isakson expressed his support for abortion rights in a campaign advertisement. In 2005, Isakson reportedly identified himself as pro-life with exceptions. In March 2017, Isakson—who was recovering from back surgery—came to the U.S. Capitol in a wheelchair to vote to repeal an Obama administration rule that had made it unlawful for states to bar abortion providers from receiving Title X funding. The Senate vote on the bill was 50–50, and Vice President Mike Pence cast a tie-breaking vote that allowed the bill to pass.

=== Agriculture ===
In July 2019, Isakson was one of eight senators to introduce the Agricultural Trucking Relief Act, legislation that would alter the definition of an agricultural commodity to include both horticultural and aquacultural products and promote a larger consistency in regulation through both federal and state agencies as part of an attempt to ease regulatory burdens on trucking and the agri-community.

=== Gun laws ===
In 2017, Isakson said that while he did support concealed carry nationwide, he did not support campus carry and stated that it is "not the appropriate thing to do."

In February 2018, in response to the Stoneman Douglas High School shooting, Isakson said, "We have to do everything we can within our powers to make sure it never happens again."

=== Healthcare ===
Isakson voted against the Affordable Care Act (also known as Obamacare) and voted more than 60 times to repeal it.

=== Immigration ===
In 2019, Isakson voted to support President Donald Trump's national emergency declaration regarding border security.

== Personal life ==
Isakson and his wife, Dianne, were married in 1968, and had three children. His wife is a watercolor artist, and served as honorary co-chair for Marietta's Theatre in the Square playhouse in 2007.

=== Health and death ===
In June 2015, Isakson disclosed that he had been diagnosed with Parkinson's disease, but added that the diagnosis would not affect his 2016 re-election plans. He continued his campaign and was elected in November 2016 to serve a third six-year term in the Senate. On August 28, 2019, however, Isakson announced that he would resign his Senate seat for health reasons on December 31, 2019.

Isakson died at his home in Atlanta on December 19, 2021, nine days short of his 77th birthday.

== Electoral history ==
1990 Georgia gubernatorial election
Party	Candidate	Votes	%	±%
Democratic	Zell Miller	766,662	52.89	−17.62
Republican	Johnny Isakson	645,625	44.54	+15.05
Libertarian	Carole Ann Rand	37,367	2.58	±0
Majority		121,037	8.35	
Turnout		1,449,654		
Democratic hold				

2000 general election in Georgia's 6th congressional district
Party	Candidate	Votes	%
Republican	Johnny Isakson (incumbent)	256,595	74.75%
Democratic	Brett DeHart	86,666	25.25%
Total votes		343,261	100.00%
Turnout			
Republican hold			

2002 general election in Georgia's 6th congressional district
Party	Candidate	Votes	%
Republican	Johnny Isakson (incumbent)	163,209	79.91%
Democratic	Jeff Weisberger	41,043	20.09%
Total votes		204,252	100.00%
Turnout			
Republican hold			

2004 U.S. Senate Republican primary election in Georgia
Party	Candidate	Votes	%
Republican	Johnny Isakson	346,765	53.2%
Republican	Herman Cain	170,464	26.2%
Republican	Mac Collins	134,053	20.6%

2004 U.S. Senate general election in Georgia
Party	Candidate	Votes	%	±%
Republican	Johnny Isakson	1,864,205	57.88%	+19.97%
Democratic	Denise Majette	1,287,695	39.98%	−18.22%
Libertarian	Allen Buckley	69,051	2.14%	+2.14%
Majority		576,510	17.90%	
Turnout		3,220,951		
Republican gain from Democratic		Swing		

2010 U.S. Senate Republican primary election in Georgia
Party	Candidate	Votes	%
Republican	Johnny Isakson (incumbent)	558,298	100.00%
Total votes		558,298	100.00%

2010 U.S. Senate general election in Georgia
Party	Candidate	Votes	%	±%
Republican	Johnny Isakson (incumbent)	1,489,904	58.31%	+0.43%
Democratic	Michael Thurmond	996,516	39.00%	−0.98%
Libertarian	Chuck Donovan	68,750	2.69%	+0.55%
Independent	Steve Davis (write-in)	52	0.00%	N/A
Independent	Raymond Beckworth (write-in)	24	0.00%	N/A
Independent	Brian Russell Brown (write-in)	12	0.00%	N/A
Majority		493,388	19.31%	
Total votes		2,555,258	100.00%	
Republican hold				

2016 U.S. Senate Republican primary election in Georgia
Party	Candidate	Votes	%
Republican	Johnny Isakson (incumbent)	447,661	77.50%
Republican	Derrick Grayson	69,101	11.96%
Republican	Mary Kay Bacallao	60,898	10.54%
Total votes		577,660	100.00%

2016 U.S. Senate general election in Georgia
Party	Candidate	Votes	%	±%
Republican	Johnny Isakson (incumbent)	2,135,806	54.80%	−3.51%
Democratic	Jim Barksdale	1,599,726	41.04%	+2.04%
Libertarian	Allen Buckley	162,260	4.16%	+1.47%
Total votes		3,897,792	100.0%	N/A
Republican hold				

== See also ==
Georgia House of Representatives
Preceded by C. W. "Chuck" Edwards	Member of the Georgia House of Representatives from the 20th district, Post 1; 1977–1983	Succeeded by Joe Mack Wilson
Preceded by Al Burruss	Member of the Georgia House of Representatives from the 21st district, Post 2; 1983–1991	Succeeded by Lynda Coker
Preceded by Herbert Jones Jr.	Minority Leader of the Georgia House of Representatives; 1983–1991	Succeeded by Paul Heard
Georgia State Senate
Preceded by William F. English	Member of the Georgia State Senate from the 21st district 1993–1997	Succeeded by Robert Lamutt
Party political offices
Preceded by Guy Davis	Republican nominee for Governor of Georgia; 1990	Succeeded by Guy Millner
Preceded by Mack Mattingly	Republican nominee for U.S. Senator from Georgia (Class 3); 2004, 2010, 2016	Succeeded by Kelly Loeffler
U.S. House of Representatives
Preceded by Newt Gingrich	Member of the U.S. House of Representatives from Georgia's 6th congressional district 1999–2005	Succeeded by Tom Price
U.S. Senate
Preceded by Zell Miller	U.S. Senator (Class 3) from Georgia; 2005–2019; Served alongside: Saxby Chambliss, David Perdue	Succeeded by Kelly Loeffler
Preceded by John Cornyn	Ranking Member of the Senate Ethics Committee; 2009–2015	Succeeded by Barbara Boxer
Preceded by Bernie Sanders	Chair of the Senate Veterans Affairs Committee; 2015–2019	Succeeded by Jerry Moran
Preceded by Barbara Boxer	Chair of the Senate Ethics Committee; 2015–2019	Succeeded by James Lankford
