= 1999 United States House of Representatives elections =

1999 U.S. House of Representatives elections
- February 23, 1999 – November 16, 1999

3 (out of 435) seats in the U.S. House of Representatives 218 seats needed for a majority
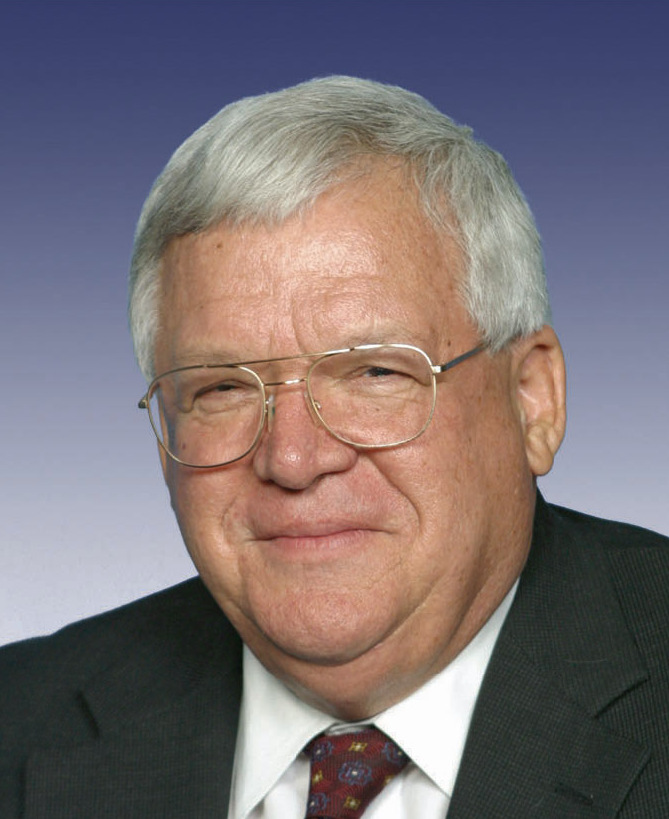

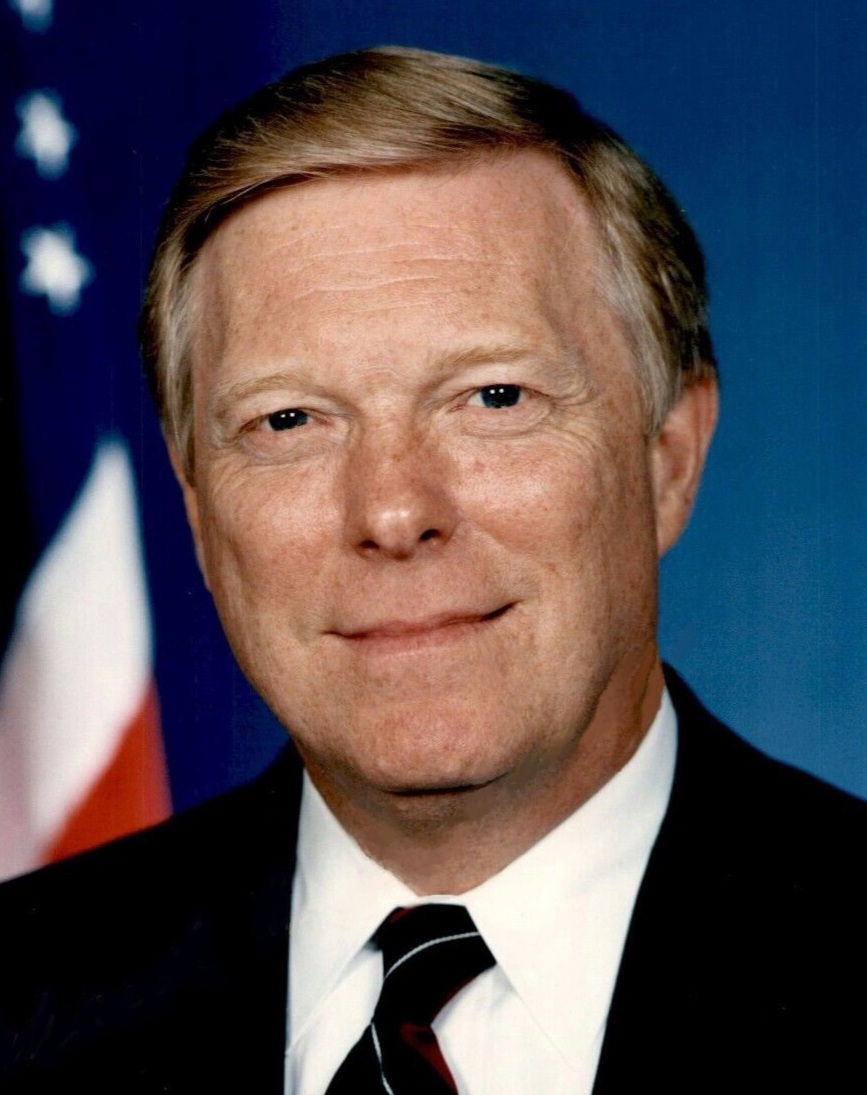
	Majority party	Minority party
Leader	Dennis Hastert	Dick Gephardt
Party	Republican	Democratic
Leader since	January 3, 1999	June 6, 1989
Leader's seat	Illinois 14th	Missouri 3rd
Last election	223 seats	211 seats
Seats won	2	1
Seat change	Steady	Steady

There were three elections in 1999 to the United States House of Representatives:

== Summary ==
Elections are listed by date and district.

District	Incumbent			This race	
District	Member	Party	First elected	Results	Candidates
Georgia 6	Newt Gingrich	Republican	1978	Incumbent won reelection, but resigned at the end of the previous Congress, and declined to be seated at the current Congress. New member elected February 23, 1999. Republican hold.	▌ ✓ Johnny Isakson (Republican) 65.08%; ▌Christina Fawcett Jeffrey (Republican) 25.39%; ▌Gary Pelphrey (Democratic) 5.07%; Others: ▌Barry Doublestein (Republican) 2.01%; ▌Leigh Baier (Republican) 1.84%; ▌Joseph Longo (Republican) 0.60%
Louisiana 1	Bob Livingston	Republican	1977 (special)	Incumbent resigned March 1, 1999. New member elected May 29, 1999. Republican hold.	▌ ✓ David Vitter (Republican) 50.75%; ▌Dave Treen (Republican) 49.25%
California 42	George Brown Jr.	Democratic	1972	Incumbent died July 15, 1999. New member elected November 16, 1999. Democratic hold.	▌ ✓ Joe Baca (Democratic) 50.55%; ▌Elia Pirozzi (Republican) 44.85%; ▌Rick Simon (Reform) 2.56%; ▌Scott Ballard (Libertarian) 2.04%
