= Mikaya Thurmond =

American television journalist

Mikaya Thurmond is an American television journalist who formerly worked as a weekday morning anchor at WRAL-TV in Raleigh, North Carolina. An Atlanta, Georgia native, she is a graduate of the Henry W. Grady College of Journalism and Mass Communication at the University of Georgia and of Harvard Extension School. She held the title of Miss Georgia 2009 and became the International titleholder for the Miss International Organization in 2010.

In February 2022, she became the benefactor of the Mikaya Thurmond Scholarship that will be available to contestants in the Miss North Carolina competition to encourage women to study journalism. On July 25, 2022, she announced her departure from WRAL-TV effective August 12, 2022.

Her father is Georgia Democrat politician Mike Thurmond.
