= Bill Heath (politician) =

American politician (born 1959)

Member of the Georgia Senate from the 31st district
- In office January 10, 2005 – January 11, 2021
- Preceded by: Nathan Dean
- Succeeded by: Jason Anavitarte

Member of the Georgia House of Representatives from the 18th district
- In office January 13, 2003 – January 10, 2005
- Preceded by: Tom Murphy
- Succeeded by: Mark Butler

Personal details
- Born: October 20, 1959 (age 66)
- Party: Republican
- Spouse: Susan
- Children: William, Sandy
- Education: Southern Tech
- Occupation: farmer, engineer
- Committees: Agriculture and Consumer Affairs; Appropriations

William Donald "Bill" Heath, Jr. (born October 20, 1959) is a former Republican Georgia state senator who served from 2005 to 2021. He served as the Senate Floor Leader for Governor Sonny Perdue. Prior to his election to the state senate, Heath served one two-year term in the Georgia House of Representatives.

== Political career ==
Bill Heath's first foray into electoral politics was in 2000, when he challenged Tom Murphy, the Democratic Speaker of the Georgia House of Representatives, for the 18th State House District. Murphy had held the seat since 1960, and had skated to reelection time and again.

Despite the state Republican Party taking no initial interest in the race, a very competitive race would materialize. Heath would raise over $60,000, a very competitive sum for a State House race. Aiding Heath was the ongoing shift in the district's demographics, with the district becoming more suburban and more Republican as Atlanta's outer suburbs had begun bleeding into the district; Republican candidates for other offices had frequently won the district Heath would lose the race by 505 votes, a margin of less than two percentage points.

Heath finally defeated Murphy in 2002, in the final race of Murphy's life. The loss was widely attributed to Murphy's role in the 2001 redistricting, which produced contorted districts that confused and angered voters.

Upon taking his seat in the Georgia House, Heath acquired national attention in 2004, when he added a ban on adult women's ability to choose to get genital piercings onto a bill designed to ban the genital mutilation of children. Adult men would still have been allowed to choose to have their genitals pierced under Heath's amendment. The attention arose from both the difference in the way Heath's amendment treated women and men and from Heath's seeming lack of knowledge regarding the practice he proposed to legislate. The amended bill passed the House 160-0, forcing it back to the Georgia Senate.

== Email Controversy ==
In 2013, after an online petition generated by the group Better Georgia, Heath was condemned for his response to legislature creating a $150,000 a year position for former Majority Leader Chip Rogers at Georgia Public Broadcasting. Heath dismissed those who signed the petition as "childish" in an email response, and hid in the Secretary of the Senate Office refusing to take questions from the press.

== Election history ==
Election history of Bill Heath
| Year | Office | Election | Subject | Party | Votes | % | Opponent | Party | Votes | % | Opponent | Party | Votes | % |
|---|---|---|---|---|---|---|---|---|---|---|---|---|---|---|
| 2000 | Georgia House, 18th District | Primary | Bill Heath | Republican | 627 | 100.0 | | | | | | | | |
| 2000 | Georgia House, 18th District | General | Bill Heath | Republican | 6,562 | 48.1 | Tom Murphy (incumbent) | Democratic | 7,067 | 51.9 | | | | |
| 2002 | Georgia House, 18th District | Primary | Bill Heath | Republican | 2,989 | 100.0 | | | | | | | | |
| 2002 | Georgia House, 18th District | General | Bill Heath | Republican | 6,431 | 53.9 | Tom Murphy (incumbent) | Democratic | 5,495 | 46.1 | | | | |
| 2004 | Georgia Senate, 31st District | Primary | Bill Heath | Republican | 5,217 | 31.0 | James Garner | Republican | 5,046 | 30.0 | Mason Rountree | Republican | 6,542 | 38.9 |
| 2004 | Georgia Senate, 31st District | Primary Runoff | Bill Heath | Republican | 5,342 | 50.6 | Mason Rountree | Republican | 5,215 | 49.4 | | | | |
| 2004 | Georgia Senate, 31st District | General | Bill Heath | Republican | 37,822 | 65.1 | Lester Tate | Democratic | 20,302 | 34.9 | | | | |
| 2006 | Georgia Senate, 31st District | Primary | Bill Heath (incumbent) | Republican | 6,200 | 100.0 | | | | | | | | |
| 2006 | Georgia Senate, 31st District | General | Bill Heath (incumbent) | Republican | 25,875 | 68.0 | Tracey Bennett | Democratic | 12,156 | 32.0 | | | | |
| 2008 | Georgia Senate, 31st District | Primary | Bill Heath (incumbent) | Republican | 10,658 | 100.0 | | | | | | | | |
| 2008 | Georgia Senate, 31st District | General | Bill Heath (incumbent) | Republican | 47,859 | 66.5 | Tracey Bennett | Democratic | 24,086 | 33.5 | | | | |
