= Kevin Cooke =

American politician

Member of the Georgia House of Representatives from the 18th district
- In office January 10, 2011 – January 11, 2021
- Preceded by: Mark Butler
- Succeeded by: Tyler Smith

Personal details
- Born: February 1, 1980 (age 46) Carrollton, Georgia
- Party: Republican
- Spouse: Crystal
- Children: 2

Kevin Cooke (born February 1, 1980) is an American politician. He served as a member of the Georgia House of Representatives from the 18th District from 2011-2021. Cooke sponsored 125 bills. He is a member of the Republican Party.

In 2020, he ran for the United States House of Representatives for Georgia's 14th congressional district. He was endorsed by state lieutenant governor Geoff Duncan, but was defeated in the Republican primary.
