= Tyler Smith (Georgia politician) =

American politician

Tyler Paul Smith

Member of the Georgia House of Representatives from the 18th district
- Incumbent
- Assumed office January 11, 2021
- Preceded by: Kevin Cooke

Personal details
- Born: Tyler Paul Smith; July 7, 1990 (age 36)
- Party: Republican
- Spouse: Shannon
- Children: One
- Education: The Citadel; John Marshall Law School

Tyler Paul Smith (born July 7, 1990) is an American politician from Georgia. Smith is a Republican member of Georgia House of Representatives for District 18.
