= Georgia's 18th House of Representatives district =

State district in Georgia, USA

Georgia's 18th State House of Representatives district
Representative
Tyler Smith; R–Bremen
- Demographics: 72.7% White; 15.7% Black; 7.8% Hispanic; 1.5% Asian
- Population: 54,577

District 18 elects one member of the Georgia House of Representatives. It contains the entirety of Haralson County as well as parts of Carroll County and Paulding County.

== Members ==
- Tom Murphy (1973–2003)
- Bill Heath (2003–2005)
- Mark Butler (2005–2011)
- Kevin Cooke (2011–2021)
- Tyler Smith (since 2021)
