= William F. English =

American politician

Member of the Georgia State Senate from the 21st district
- In office 1977–1992
- Preceded by: Preston B. Lewis Jr.
- Succeeded by: Johnny Isakson

Personal details
- Born: William Frank English; February 26, 1934 Jefferson County, Georgia, U.S.
- Died: February 22, 2021 (aged 86) Valdosta, Georgia, U.S.
- Party: Democratic
- Spouse: Barbara Johnson
- Children: 5
- Education: University of Georgia

William Frank English (February 26, 1934 – February 22, 2021) was an American politician. He served as a Democratic member for the 21st district of the Georgia State Senate.

== Life and career ==
English was born in Jefferson County, Georgia. He attended the University of Georgia, where he earned his Bachelor of Science degree in 1954. He served in the United States Air Force during the Korean War for three years.

English was a councilman in Swainsboro, Georgia from 1972 to 1976. In the next year, he was elected to represent the 21st district of the Georgia State Senate. He left office in 1992.

English died in February 2021 at the South Georgia Medical Center in Valdosta, Georgia, at the age of 86.
