= Charles W. Edwards =

American politician (1934–2015)

Member of the Georgia House of Representatives
- In office 1975–1976

Personal details
- Born: March 13, 1934 Randolph County, North Carolina, U.S.
- Died: January 19, 2015 (aged 80)
- Party: Democratic
- Education: North Carolina State University

Charles W. Edwards (March 13, 1934 – January 19, 2015) was an American politician. He served as a Democratic member of the Georgia House of Representatives.

== Life and career ==
Born in Randolph County, North Carolina, Edwards attended North Carolina State University, and served in the Georgia House of Representatives from 1975 to 1976. He died on January 19, 2015, at the age of 80.
