= Hospice Savannah =

Nonprofit hospice in Savannah, Georgia

Hospice Savannah is a non-profit hospice based in Savannah, Georgia that was started in 1979. Hospice Savannah provides its services to an average of 200 terminally ill patients at a time in Chatham, Effingham, Bryan, Long, and Liberty counties. Being non-profit, Hospice Savannah is community-based and is a member agency of the United Way of the Coastal Empire. It is certified by Medicare and Medicaid and will provide its services to any patient regardless of any financial situations. It employs around 200 people and also receives support from its large volunteer group.

== Services ==
Hospice Savannah provides a variety of services to its patients: nursing care, social work help, all medications, therapies, and medical equipment, such as oxygen and hospital beds. As a not-for-profit, Hospice Savannah also provides a story keeper, certified music therapist, massage therapists, and a massage therapist. Nutritional counseling and speech therapy is available as needed. Medications and equipment are delivered to the home of the patient without any cost. Hospice Savannah also provides care to patients in nursing homes and assisted living facilities, or in its own homelike Hospice House. In emergencies Hospice Savannah can admit its patients to Hospice House, and registered nurses and social workers are on call 24 hours a day year round.

Hospice Savannah also provides bereavement care and counseling for up to 13 months after a loved one's death through its Full Circle Grief and Loss Center. Community members can also access grief support at no charge.

== Staff ==
Hospice Savannah employs around 200 people. Direct patient care teams consist of a registered nurse, a masters prepared social worker, chaplain, certified nursing assistant, and volunteer who all meet weekly with their medical director. Hospice Savannah's Butterfly team has won awards for its pediatric end-of-life care. Hospice Savannah's president and C.E.O. is Debra Anthony Larson, MSW. Unlike most hospices, Hospice Savannah also has two full-time medical directors. Dr. Kelly Erola, Chief Medical Director and Dr. Julia Johnson. Both make home visits in each of the five counties served by Hospice Savannah.

== Fundraisers ==
Hospice Savannah, Inc. funds such "extras" as massage therapy, story keeping, music therapy, grief and loss counseling, an overnight Children's Grief Camp, Pet Peace of Mind program, "We Honor Veterans" program, etc. completely through donations and fundraisers. Full information is on the Foundation pages of their website. Over the years they have received many large grants from corporations and raised $5 Million dollars during their Spirit of Living campaign in 2001. In September 2015, the Foundation opened the Demere Center for Living to house the community-funded programs: Full Circle Grief and Loss Center, The Steward Center for Palliative Care, and the Edel Caregiver Institute to support and educate family caregivers - hopefully long before their loved ones need palliative or hospice care. Summer Nights parties are held during June to fund raise for the hospice's Daily Impact Fund, and the Tree of Light is an annual memorial gathering and fundraiser benefiting the grief support services provided at no charge by Full Circle's bereavement counselors. It is usually held on the first Sunday in December. Individuals can sponsor a light to honor or in memory of a loved one.

== Locations ==
Hospice Savannah has three locations. The administrative offices are located at 1674 Chatham Parkway; Hospice House is located at 1352 Eisenhower Drive; and the Demere Center for Living (housing Full Circle bereavement counselors, Steward Center for Palliative Care staff if needed, the Foundation staff, and the Edel Caregiver Institute) is located at 6000 Business Center Drive, off Chatham Parkway.
