= Bruce Thompson (Georgia politician) =

American politician (1965–2024)

- Official portrait, 2018

Labor Commissioner of Georgia
- In office January 12, 2023 – November 24, 2024
- Governor: Brian Kemp
- Preceded by: Mark Butler
- Succeeded by: Louis DeBroux (acting)

Member of the Georgia State Senate from the 14th district
- In office December 12, 2013 – January 9, 2023
- Preceded by: Barry Loudermilk
- Succeeded by: Josh McLaurin

Personal details
- Born: Bruce Anthony Thompson; February 9, 1965 Big Sandy, Montana, U.S.
- Died: November 24, 2024 (aged 59) Cartersville, Georgia, U.S.
- Party: Republican
- Spouse: Becky
- Children: 2
- Education: Montana State University, Northern (AA); Reinhardt University (BBA)
- Website: Campaign website

Military service
- Allegiance: United States
- Branch/service: United States Army
- Unit: Montana Army National Guard

Bruce Anthony Thompson (February 9, 1965 – November 24, 2024) was an American politician from the state of Georgia. He was a member of the Republican Party and represented the 14th district in the Georgia State Senate from 2013 to 2023. From 2023 until his death, he served as Georgia Labor Commissioner.

== Early life and career ==
Thompson graduated Big Sandy High School in Big Sandy, Montana, in 1983. He attended Montana State University–Northern on a scholarship for wrestling and earned his associate's degree in 1985. He graduated from Reinhardt University with a bachelor in business administration in 2021.

Thompson served in the Montana Army National Guard for four years in tanks. He worked as an insurance agent, as owner of an Allstate firm. Thompson chaired the Cartersville-Bartow Chamber of Commerce and served as chairman of Personnel at Cartersville First Baptist Church.

== Political career ==
Thompson ran as a Republican in the 2013 special election to the Georgia Senate for District 14 to fill the remainder of the term of Barry Loudermilk, who resigned to focus on his campaign for a seat in the United States House of Representatives. He defeated fellow Republican businessman Matt Laughridge in a runoff election. In the Georgia Senate, Thompson became the chair of the economic development and tourism committee.

In June 2021, Thompson announced his candidacy for the Republican nomination for Georgia Labor Commissioner in the 2022 elections, challenging incumbent Commissioner Mark Butler. In March 2022, amid backlash over delayed unemployment benefits, Butler announced that he would not run for reelection, citing his wife's health. He won the Republican Party nomination, with Mike Coan, a former member of the Georgia House of Representatives, finishing in second place. Thompson won the general election on November 8, defeating William Boddie, a Democratic member of the state house. Thompson's office reported finding $105 million of unremitted state money which should have been turned over to the state treasury in August 2023.

== Personal life and death ==
Thompson lived in Cartersville, Georgia. He and his wife, Becky, had two children.

In March 2024, Thompson announced that he had stage IV pancreatic cancer. He died from the illness on November 24, 2024, at the age of 59.

Party political offices
Preceded by Mark Butler	Republican nominee for Labor Commissioner of Georgia; 2022	Most recent
Political offices
Preceded by Mark Butler	Labor Commissioner of Georgia; 2023–2024	Succeeded by Louis DeBroux; Acting
