= The only poll that counts... =

Phrase dismissing opinion poll results

The phrase "The only poll that counts..." is used by politicians to dismiss the importance of opinion polls and highlight the importance of polling day. It is particularly used as a response to questions about negative opinion poll results and is generally considered tongue-in-cheek or ironic. It is particularly well known as a feature of Australian politics where its inclusion in party-political briefings and instructions has caused controversy. The generally accepted continuation of the phrase is, "...is the one on election day".

== Context ==
In his book Polling and the Public: What Every Citizen Should Know, Herb Asher provides a general explanation of the context in which the phrase is used. He suggests that the phrase has its origins in attempts by poorly performing politicians to discredit polling as an accurate reflection of their performance. The phrase, he suggests, questions the accuracy of polling by drawing attention to historical, inaccurate polling.

Though popular in Australia, the phrase has also occasionally been used in the United States and the United Kingdom in general the same context, with The Guardian's Jonathan Freedland describing the phrase as an "oldie but goldie".

Author Helen Geracimos Chapin credits long-term Mayor of Honolulu, Frank Fasi, in particular, with use of the phrase. Both Gerald Ford and Jimmy Carter used the phrase with regard to opinion polls - in 1976, Tom Brokaw asked Ford a question in which he suggested the President used the phrase "often" and Carter used the phrase in response to a question at a 1980 press conference.

== Recent use ==
In 2013, Australian Labor Party MP Joel Fitzgibbon, knowing he would be asked about opinion poll results revealed in the press earlier that morning, provided the following response to journalists' questions:

I brought the manual with me. I'll see what it says. It says I should say polls come and go and the only poll that counts is the poll on election day.

In doing so, he exposed the fact that party leaders and advisors had specifically added the phrase to briefing notes for Members of Parliament. The comment came in the midst of an internal campaign (in which Fitzgibbon played a leading role) to highlight the tenuous position of the then-Prime Minister Julia Gillard because of her opinion poll results. Gillard was deposed as Prime Minister later that month.
