= Patrick Labat =

American law enforcement officer and politician

Sheriff of Fulton County
- Incumbent
- Assumed office January 1, 2021
- Preceded by: Theodore Jackson

Personal details
- Born: October 5, 1967 (age 59) Atlanta, Georgia, U.S.
- Party: Democratic
- Spouse: Jacki Labat
- Children: 4
- Education: Clark Atlanta University (BA); Columbus State University (MPA)
- Occupation: Law enforcement officer

Patrick "Pat" Labat is an American law enforcement officer and the 28th Sheriff of Fulton County, whose handling of conditions inside the Fulton County Jail has drawn multiple inmate-death lawsuits, and a federal civil rights investigation by the United States Department of Justice. A member of the Democratic Party, Labat took office on January 1, 2021.

== Early life and education ==
Labat was born on October 5, 1967, in Atlanta, Georgia. He was raised in Atlanta and graduated from Frederick Douglass High School. He attended Clark Atlanta University, earning a Bachelor of Arts, and later completed a Master of Public Administration from Columbus State University.

== Law enforcement career ==
Labat began his career in public safety in 1988 as a corrections detention officer, working overnight shifts while attending college during the day. He spent more than three decades moving up the ranks within the City of Atlanta Department of Corrections.

In 2010, he was appointed Chief of the City of Atlanta Department of Corrections, a position he held for a decade until his retirement from the city department in December 2019.

== Fulton County Sheriff ==
In 2020, Labat ran for Fulton County Sheriff to succeed retiring incumbent Theodore Jackson, defeating Jackson in the Democratic primary runoff before winning the general election unopposed. He was sworn in as the 28th Sheriff of Fulton County on January 1, 2021.

Labat's first term drew national attention when, in 2022, he oversaw security for the special grand jury convened in Fulton County to investigate alleged interference by Donald Trump and his allies in Georgia's 2020 election results.

On May 21, 2024, Labat won the Democratic primary against three challengers, and on November 5, 2024, he won re-election to a second four-year term, defeating Republican challenger Charles Rambo in the general election.

In 2026, Labat made local political headlines by endorsing challenger Mo Ivory over incumbent Robb Pitts in the Democratic primary runoff election for Fulton County Commission Chairman; Ivory went on to defeat Pitts in the June 16, 2026 runoff.

=== Inmate deaths and DOJ investigation ===
In September 2022, inmate Lashawn Thompson died in the jail's psychiatric wing in a cell infested with insects and bed bugs; Fulton County later agreed to a $4 million settlement with his family, and Labat said in a statement that his office remained committed to reforms so that "something like this never happens again." In April 2023, Labat asked three high-ranking officials, including chief jailer John Jackson, to resign amid the fallout from Thompson's death.

Following a series of additional inmate fatalities, the Civil Rights Division of the United States Department of Justice launched a 16-month investigation into the jail, beginning in July 2023. The investigation concluded with a report alleging that the sheriff's office failed to adequately protect detainees from violence, including stabbings, sexual abuse, and killings. Fulton County and the Sheriff's Office subsequently signed a federal consent decree on January 6, 2025, agreeing to implement infrastructure and safety reforms.

=== Lawsuits ===
Labat and the sheriff's office have been named as defendants in numerous lawsuits alleging mistreatment of inmates. In August 2024, the Atlanta Journal-Constitution reported on three pending suits: a wrongful-death claim over the fatal September 2022 stabbing of inmate Dino Walker, a wrongful-death claim brought on behalf of Christina Brown, who died of fentanyl toxicity in November 2022, and a federal civil rights suit brought by Trevis Bufford, who alleged he was shackled in an overcrowded cage and beaten by a jail sergeant in October 2023. The Bufford suit alleged that Labat and his former chief jailer had a pattern of failing to discipline deputies for excessive force.

In April 2026, civil rights attorney Ben Crump held a press conference concerning Rashaad Muhammad, a detainee who required the amputation of his fingers and lower legs after alleged medical neglect inside the facility. Following the press conference, a bipartisan group of Fulton County commissioners called on Georgia Governor Brian Kemp to investigate the sheriff's office.

=== Budget and procurement ===
Labat has requested additional funding from the Fulton County Board of Commissioners to build a new jail facility, citing staff shortages and aging infrastructure. In April 2024, his office's $200,000 purchase of a custom Mercedes-Benz Sprinter mobile command van without a competitive bidding process drew public criticism, as did separate questions raised about the office's use of the jail's Inmate Welfare Fund.

== Personal life ==
Labat lives in the Midwest Cascade neighborhood of Southwest Atlanta with his wife, Jacki. They have a blended family of four adult children.
