= Georgia Department of Labor =

Administrative agency of the U.S. state of Georgia

- Seal

- Logo

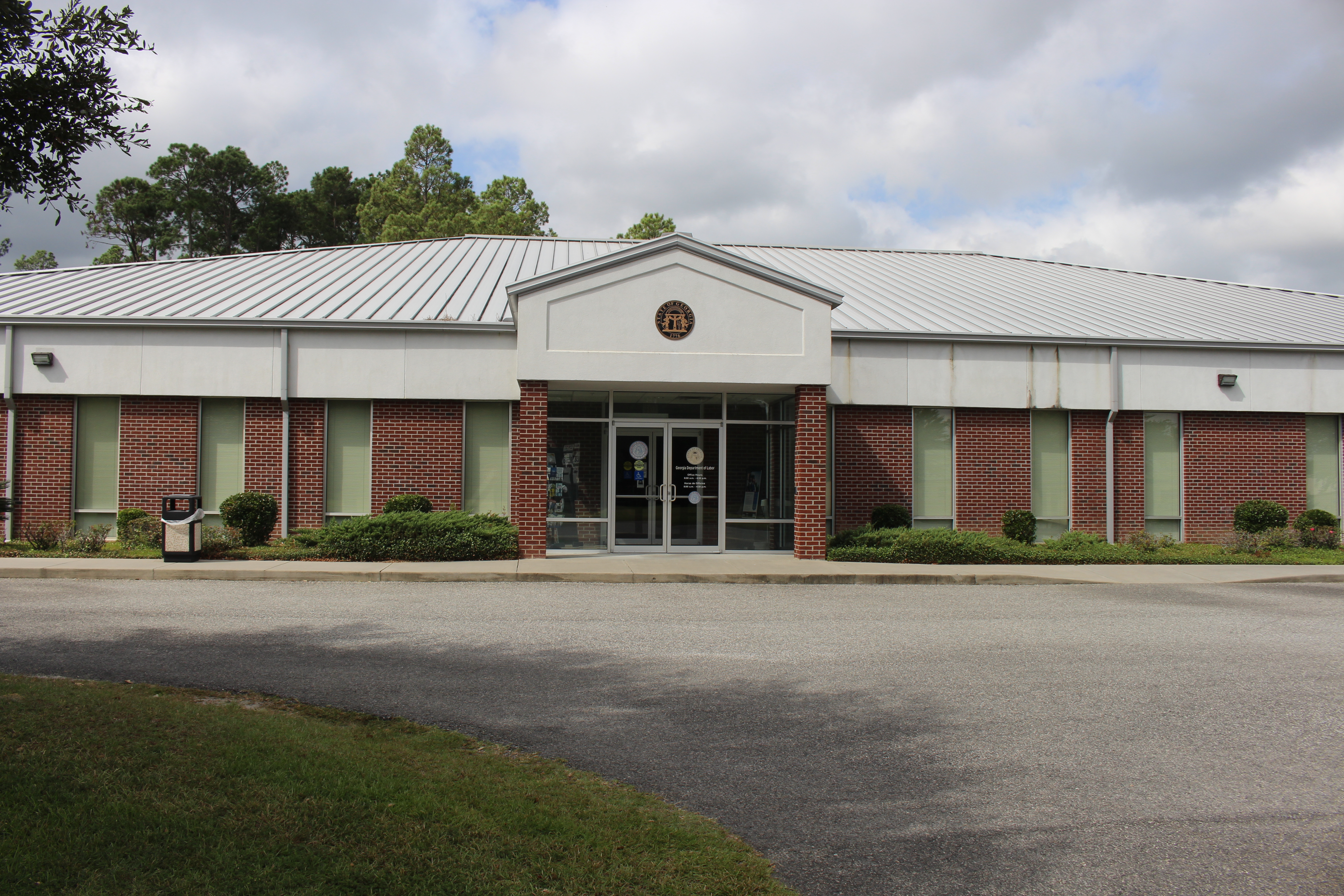
- Georgia Department of Labor, Douglas, Coffee County, Georgia

Agency overview
- Formed: 1911
- Jurisdiction: Georgia, United States
- Employees: 4000
- Agency executive: Bárbara Rivera Holmes, Labor Commissioner
- Website: dol.georgia.gov

The Georgia Department of Labor is an administrative agency of the U.S. state of Georgia. With approximately 4,000 employees in 2008, it provides services to the state's current and emerging workforce.

== History ==
The department was originally created in 1911 and called the Department of Commerce and Labor. It was tasked with overseeing labor laws and safety regulations. The passage of the Wagner-Peyser Act in 1935, which established a nationwide system of public employment offices, led to the creation of the Department of Labor in 1937. The state labor commissioner, an elected official, oversees the department. The most recent commissioner, Bruce Thompson, assumed office in 2023. Thompson died on November 24, 2024.

== Administrative mission ==
Today the Department of Labor administers the state's workforce programs, including unemployment insurance benefits and employment services, and carries out the requirements of the Workforce Investment Act (WIA) of 1998, an initiative designed to promote employment opportunities and job training using federal funds. The department is also charged with providing workforce information to the public and private sectors and for administering laws governing work conditions, employee safety, and child labor issues.

With passage of the WIA, the Department of Labor became responsible for providing workforce development services to employers and workers through comprehensive career centers, which take the place of traditional unemployment offices. As of 2008 the department operated fifty-three career centers in Georgia, providing the state's job seekers with information about training and educational resources, as well as financial aid and other support. The Technical College System of Georgia, in partnership with the Department of Labor, administers career centers on each of the system's campuses around the state.

In addition to providing such workforce services as assistance in claiming unemployment benefits, finding a job, training for a job, or surviving a layoff, the Department of Labor also provides support services through a program called GoodWorks. The program helps applicants and recipients of TANF (Temporary Assistance for Needy Families), as well as noncustodial parents, prepare for, find, and maintain employment. The department no longer supervises the state's vocational rehabilitation services. The Vocational Rehabilitation Agency now supervises the state's vocational rehabilitation services, including the operation of the Roosevelt Warm Springs Institute for Rehabilitation, which treats patients with post-polio symptoms, spinal cord injuries, strokes, and other disabilities. The Vocational Rehabilitation Agency also administers the Business Enterprise Program and Georgia Industries for the Blind; both programs offer services for citizens with visual impairments.

Through its safety engineering division, the Department of Labor conducts safety inspections and offers workplace safety programs. This division is also responsible for collecting data on workplace injuries that occur in Georgia. The child labor division administers and monitors restrictions for employees less than eighteen years of age and also helps to create summer jobs for youth in communities where suitable jobs are scarce. In 2007 the department provided $1 million to create jobs for 830 children between the ages of fourteen and twenty-one.

== Data collection ==
Workforce information provided by the Department of Labor includes industry data, labor force and unemployment statistics, occupational trends, and general economic information. The department also holds an annual televised job fair, in conjunction with Georgia Public Broadcasting, which familiarizes Georgia citizens with the services available through the department and its workforce partners. The 2007 job fair, broadcast on television, radio, and the Internet, focused on the department's assistance services to displaced workers, particularly those affected by plant closures and natural disasters.

== Georgia Commissioners of Labor ==
- Ben Huiet, 1938–1967
- Sam Caldwell, 1967–1984
- Joe Tanner, 1984–1990
- Ray Hollingsworth, 1990–1991
- Al Scott, 1991–1992
- David Poythress, 1992–1998
- Marti Fullerton, 1998–1999
- Mike Thurmond, 1999–2011
- Mark Butler, 2011–2023
- Bruce Thompson, 2023–2024
- Louis DeBroux (acting), 2024–2025
- Bárbara Rivera Holmes, 2025–present
