= Mike Thurmond =

American politician (born 1953)

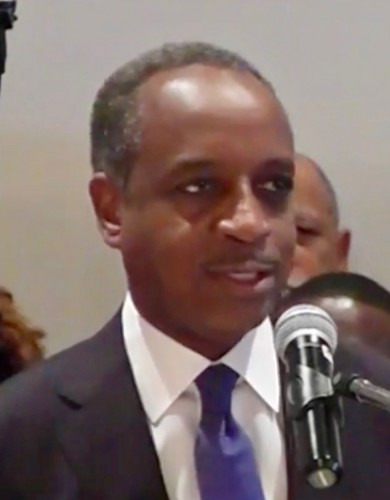
- Thurmond in 2016

Chief Executive Officer of DeKalb County
- In office January 1, 2017 – January 1, 2025
- Preceded by: Burrell Ellis
- Succeeded by: Lorraine Cochran- Johnson

Labor Commissioner of Georgia
- In office January 11, 1999 – January 10, 2011
- Governor: Roy Barnes; Sonny Perdue
- Preceded by: Marti Fullerton
- Succeeded by: Mark Butler

Member of the Georgia House of Representatives from the 67th district
- In office January 12, 1987 – January 11, 1993
- Preceded by: Hugh Logan
- Succeeded by: Mike Polak

Personal details
- Born: January 5, 1953 (age 73) Athens, Georgia, U.S.
- Party: Democratic
- Spouse: Zola Fletcher
- Children: Mikaya
- Education: Paine College (BA); University of South Carolina (JD)

Michael L. Thurmond (born January 5, 1953) is an American author, attorney, and politician. A Democrat, he was previously the Chief Executive Officer of DeKalb County and a representative in the Georgia General Assembly. He served as Georgia Labor Commissioner from 1999 to 2011.

Thurmond served as the interim superintendent of the DeKalb County School District, the third largest district in the state of Georgia from 2013 to 2015. The district serves nearly 99,000 students with over 13,400 employees. Thurmond was the Democratic Party's nominee for United States Senate in 2010. He was also one of the last Democrats to win statewide in Georgia until 2020, when Joe Biden won the state in the 2020 presidential election. Thurmond ran for Governor of Georgia in the 2026 election but lost the Democratic primary to Keisha Lance Bottoms.

Prior to becoming DeKalb's Schools Superintendent, Thurmond was an attorney at Butler Wooten Cheeley & Peak LLP.

== Early life ==
Thurmond was raised as a sharecropper's son in Clarke County, Georgia. He graduated cum laude with a B.A. in philosophy and religion from Paine College and later earned a Juris Doctor degree from the University of South Carolina School of Law. He also completed the Political Executives program at the John F. Kennedy School of Government at Harvard University.

== Political career ==
In 1986, he became the first African-American elected to the Georgia General Assembly from Clarke County since Reconstruction.

By 1994, he was appointed by Governor Zell Miller as director of the state's Division of Family and Children Services (DFACS).

In 1997, Thurmond became a distinguished lecturer at the University of Georgia Carl Vinson Institute of Government. The following year in November, he was elected Georgia Labor Commissioner.

In 2016, Thurmond decided to run for the open DeKalb County C.E.O.'s office being vacated by term-limited incumbent Democrat Burrell Ellis. He won overwhelmingly in the Democratic Primary, and went on to win by a significant margin over his Republican opponent in the November 2016 general election. Thurmond began his four-year term on January 1, 2017.

He is the recipient of two honorary doctorate degrees from Clark Atlanta University and LaGrange College.

He serves on the Board of Curators of the Georgia Historical Society.

== U.S. Senate campaign ==
In April 2010, Thurmond announced his intention to run for the United States Senate, challenging incumbent Republican Johnny Isakson. He easily defeated his opponent in the Democratic primary, county employee RJ Hadley, on July 20. He lost the general election to Isakson, receiving 39% of the vote, and was succeeded as Commissioner of Labor by former state representative Mark Butler, a member of the Republican Party.

== Gubernatorial campaign ==
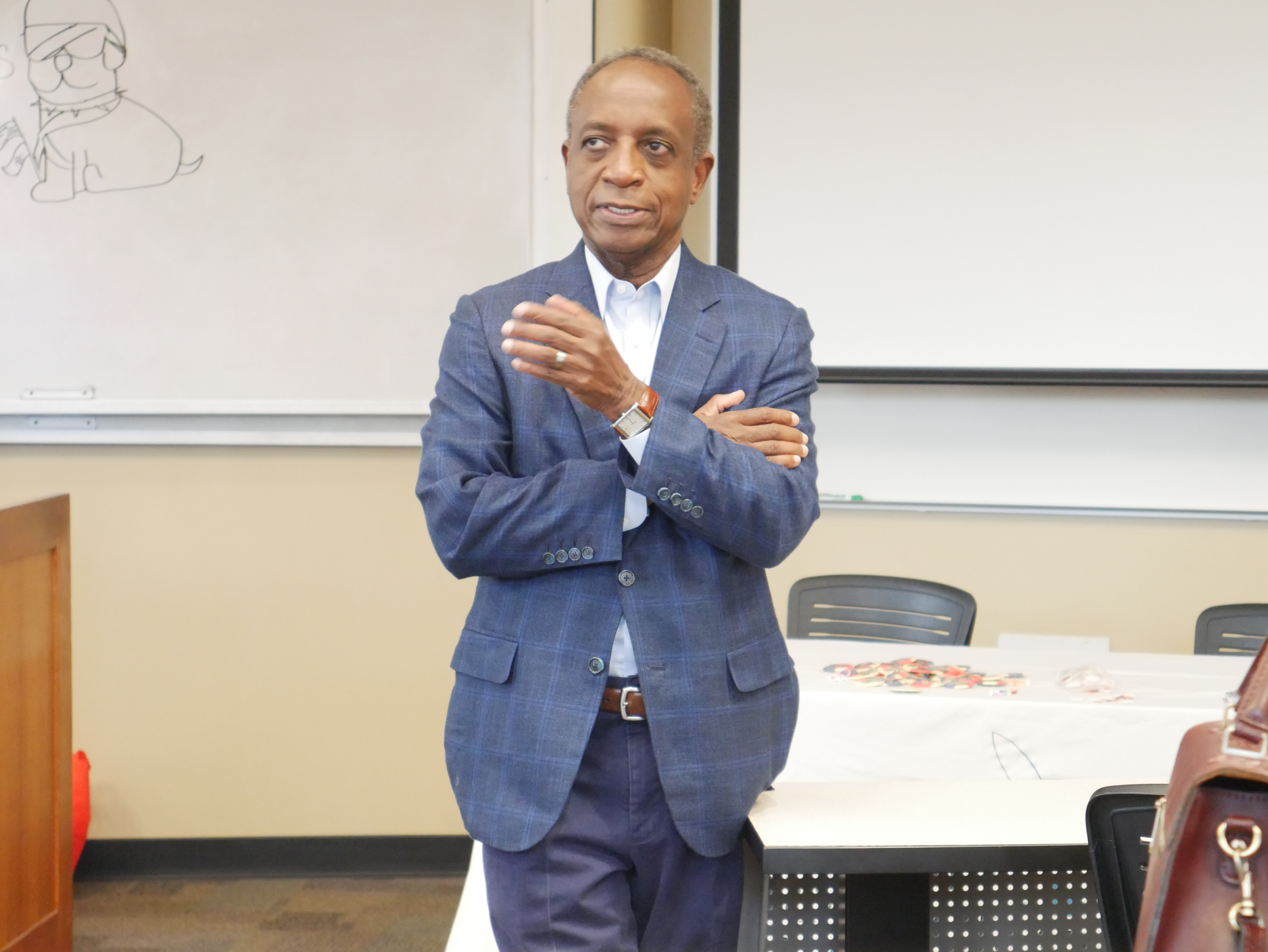
Thurmond speaking to the Young Democrats of UGA

In August 2025, Thurmond announced a campaign for Governor of Georgia in the 2026 election.

== Publications ==
Thurmond's book, Freedom: Georgia's Antislavery Heritage, 1733-1865, was awarded the Georgia Historical Society's Lilla Hawes Award. The Georgia Center for the Book listed Freedom on its 2005 list of The 25 Books All Georgians Should Read.

== Personal life ==
He is married to Zola Fletcher Thurmond, and they have one daughter, Mikaya Thurmond.

== See also ==
- List of African-American United States Senate candidates

Party political offices
Preceded by David Poythress	Democratic nominee for Labor Commissioner of Georgia; 1998, 2002, 2006	Succeeded by Darryl Hicks
Preceded by Denise Majette	Democratic nominee for U.S. Senator from Georgia (Class 3); 2010	Succeeded by Jim Barksdale
Political offices
Preceded by Marti Fullerton	Labor Commissioner of Georgia; 1999–2011	Succeeded by Mark Butler
