= 2004 Georgia flag referendum =

- March 2, 2004

Candidate	2003 flag	2001 flag
Popular vote	577,370	212,020
Percentage	73.1%	26.9%
2003 flag
80–90%
70–80%
60–70%
50–60%
2001 flag
50–60%
Flag before election
Flag after election

The 2004 Georgia flag referendum was a legislatively referred advisory referendum in Georgia. It took place on March 2, 2004, alongside the state's presidential primaries. The result was overwhelmingly in favor of the 2003 flag, which received 73.1% of the vote.

== Background ==
Flag of Georgia from 1920 to 1956

Flag of Georgia from 1956 to 2001

Flag of Georgia from 2001 to 2003

Flag of Georgia from 2003

The flag of Georgia adopted in 1956 contained part of the Confederate flag. In 1992, governor of Georgia Zell Miller expressed his intention to remove this Confederate imagery, describing it as the "last remaining vestige of days that are not only gone but also days that we have no right to be proud of." While legislation was introduced to change the flag, this was unsuccessful, and by 1993 Miller had conceded that changing the flag would not be possible. A 2000 report by the Georgia State Senate found the introduction of the 1956 flag to be a symbol of racist protest against desegregation.

Roy Barnes responded to calls for a new flag in 2001 by encouraging legislation on the matter. The flag that was approved was originally designed around the time of the 1992 dispute by Cecil Alexander. HB 16 was passed on January 30, 2001, enacting the new flag. This design reduced the Confederate imagery to a small version of the 1956 flag. Critics labelled the flag "Barnes’s rag", and the city of Trenton adopted a modified version of the 1956 flag in protest.

In the 2002 gubernatorial election, Republican candidate Sonny Perdue defeated Barnes. Perdue ran on the promise to allow a statewide referendum on the flag of Georgia. While it was implied that the referendum would be on the 1956 flag, the initial bill, HB 380, legislated for 2 referendums; the first on a redesign, and the second (if the redesign was rejected) between the pre- and post-1956 flags. However, following concerns from some legislators, this was amended to be 1 referendum between the 2001 and 2003 flags. HB 380 was passed on the last day of the 2003 session. An executive order by Perdue ordered the redesign to be displayed by entities required to display the Georgia flag, rather than the 2001 flag.

== Text ==
The question on the ballot read:

Should the State of Georgia keep the 2003 Flag adopted at the 2003 Session of the General Assembly or return to the 2001 Flag adopted at the 2001 Session of the General Assembly?

Both flags were pictured on the ballot.

== Result ==
Option	Votes	
Option	Num.	%
2003 flag	577,370	73.14
2001 flag	212,020	26.86
Total	789,390	100.00
Source: Georgia Secretary of State

=== Results by county ===
County	2003 flag	2003%	2001 flag	2001%
Appling	1,180	76.18%	369	23.82%
Atkinson	277	76.31%	86	23.69%
Bacon	477	71.62%	189	28.38%
Baker	337	74.72%	114	25.28%
Baldwin	3,424	77.77%	979	22.23%
Banks	1,346	72.72%	505	27.28%
Barrow	2,371	77.33%	695	22.67%
Bartow	4,226	72.33%	1,617	27.67%
Ben Hill	906	72.13%	350	27.87%
Berrien	789	72.05%	306	27.95%
Bibb	9,448	48.44%	10,058	51.56%
Bleckley	705	75.32%	231	24.68%
Brantley	639	68.12%	299	31.88%
Brooks	920	75.72%	295	24.28%
Bryan	1,407	79.90%	354	20.10%
Bulloch	2,819	76.25%	878	23.75%
Burke	1,765	77.11%	524	22.89%
Butts	1,633	75.11%	541	24.89%
Calhoun	460	77.83%	131	22.17%
Camden	1,181	67.03%	581	32.97%
Candler	527	78.42%	145	21.58%
Carroll	5,959	75.21%	1,964	24.79%
Catoosa	2,430	68.68%	1,108	31.32%
Charlton	349	59.97%	233	40.03%
Chatham	18,244	77.90%	5,177	22.10%
Chattahoochee	184	65.71%	96	34.29%
Chattooga	1,675	78.13%	469	21.88%
Cherokee	8,585	74.10%	3,001	25.90%
Clarke	8,952	79.94%	2,247	20.06%
Clay	254	71.55%	101	28.45%
Clayton	15,929	68.79%	7,228	31.21%
Clinch	212	67.52%	102	32.48%
Cobb	42,943	71.90%	16,787	28.10%
Coffee	1,288	74.32%	445	25.68%
Colquitt	1,976	74.62%	672	25.38%
Columbia	5,990	75.53%	1,941	24.47%
Cook	728	69.87%	314	30.13%
Coweta	10,002	74.47%	3,429	25.53%
Crawford	670	71.81%	263	28.19%
Crisp	1,085	75.24%	357	24.76%
Dade	712	72.06%	276	27.94%
Dawson	1,727	74.99%	576	25.01%
Decatur	1,556	79.96%	390	20.04%
DeKalb	67,357	72.99%	24,921	27.01%
Dodge	1,218	78.03%	343	21.97%
Dooly	828	79.23%	217	20.77%
Dougherty	8,335	74.57%	2,843	25.43%
Douglas	6,266	71.72%	2,417	28.28%
Early	657	73.82%	233	26.18%
Echols	111	64.91%	60	35.09%
Effingham	2,371	79.11%	626	20.89%
Elbert	1,386	72.49%	526	27.51%
Emanuel	1,386	78.75%	374	21.25%
Evans	657	78.59%	179	21.41%
Fannin	1,231	70.34%	519	29.66%
Fayette	8,620	73.98%	3,032	26.02%
Floyd	5,549	78.49%	1,521	21.51%
Forsyth	8,937	74.37%	3,080	25.63%
Franklin	1,397	74.27%	484	25.73%
Fulton	62,174	72.89%	23,125	27.11%
Gilmer	1,617	73.07%	596	26.93%
Glascock	141	73.82%	50	26.18%
Glynn	4,351	71.83%	1,706	28.17%
Gordon	2,443	75.03%	813	24.97%
Grady	1,384	71.12%	562	28.88%
Greene	2,048	77.46%	596	22.54%
Gwinnett	32,570	73.71%	11,614	26.29%
Habersham	2,345	76.51%	720	23.49%
Hall	10,949	72.98%	4,053	27.02%
Hancock	770	74.68%	261	25.32%
Haralson	1,687	75.62%	544	24.38%
Harris	1,810	73.58%	650	26.42%
Hart	2,097	72.31%	803	27.69%
Heard	752	69.50%	330	30.50%
Henry	10,699	60.15%	7,089	39.85%
Houston	7,340	77.19%	2,169	22.81%
Irwin	598	73.65%	214	26.35%
Jackson	2,851	78.65%	774	21.35%
Jasper	924	76.49%	284	23.51%
Jeff Davis	737	70.26%	312	29.74%
Jefferson	1,200	74.30%	415	25.70%
Jenkins	750	80.65%	180	19.35%
Johnson	573	80.03%	143	19.97%
Jones	2,350	76.55%	720	23.45%
Lamar	1,436	74.64%	488	25.36%
Lanier	271	69.31%	120	30.69%
Laurens	3,496	77.79%	998	22.21%
Lee	1,430	75.46%	465	24.54%
Liberty	1,856	74.09%	649	25.91%
Lincoln	752	74.60%	256	25.40%
Long	386	70.96%	158	29.04%
Lowndes	4,028	71.90%	1,574	28.10%
Lumpkin	1,780	75.71%	571	24.29%
Macon	1,042	82.70%	218	17.30%
Madison	1,724	79.34%	449	20.66%
Marion	441	68.37%	204	31.63%
McDuffie	1,291	72.86%	481	27.14%
McIntosh	932	74.56%	318	25.44%
Meriwether	1,792	75.55%	580	24.45%
Miller	355	83.53%	70	16.47%
Mitchell	1,520	75.17%	502	24.83%
Monroe	1,797	76.79%	543	23.21%
Montgomery	579	78.24%	161	21.76%
Morgan	1,709	77.40%	499	22.60%
Murray	1,312	71.62%	520	28.38%
Muscogee	11,068	71.83%	4,341	28.17%
Newton	4,978	74.60%	1,695	25.40%
Newton	4,978	74.60%	1,695	25.40%
Oconee	2,972	84.41%	549	15.59%
Oglethorpe	1,306	80.57%	315	19.43%
Paulding	5,167	73.90%	1,825	26.10%
Peach	1,605	77.65%	462	22.35%
Pickens	1,717	75.27%	564	24.73%
Pierce	850	79.37%	221	20.63%
Pike	1,339	77.04%	399	22.96%
Polk	3,410	81.02%	799	18.98%
Pulaski	600	80.32%	147	19.68%
Putnam	1,628	74.95%	544	25.05%
Quitman	152	72.04%	59	27.96%
Rabun	1,193	71.78%	469	28.22%
Randolph	540	74.90%	181	25.10%
Richmond	12,152	72.86%	4,661	27.14%
Rockdale	5,331	73.16%	1,956	26.84%
Schley	193	71.48%	77	28.52%
Screven	1,191	80.64%	286	19.36%
Seminole	670	77.64%	193	22.36%
Spalding	3,611	73.07%	1,331	26.93%
Stephens	1,665	73.87%	589	26.13%
Stewart	398	77.89%	113	22.11%
Sumter	1,788	77.98%	505	22.02%
Talbot	588	72.68%	221	27.32%
Taliaferro	186	79.83%	47	20.17%
Tattnall	1,071	79.22%	281	20.78%
Taylor	592	74.37%	204	25.63%
Telfair	639	77.93%	181	22.07%
Terrell	673	75.70%	216	24.30%
Thomas	2,418	72.81%	903	27.19%
Tift	1,693	77.38%	495	22.62%
Toombs	1,495	79.82%	378	20.18%
Towns	896	73.02%	331	26.98%
Treutlen	447	75.63%	144	24.37%
Troup	3,489	72.98%	1,292	27.02%
Turner	397	73.38%	144	26.62%
Twiggs	760	70.57%	317	29.43%
Union	2,036	75.60%	657	24.40%
Upson	1,950	76.71%	592	23.29%
Walker	3,276	74.88%	1,099	25.12%
Walton	3,898	78.83%	1,047	21.17%
Ware	2,097	77.07%	624	22.93%
Warren	511	74.49%	175	25.51%
Washington	1,871	79.28%	489	20.72%
Wayne	1,644	72.39%	627	27.61%
Webster	210	76.92%	63	23.08%
Wheeler	272	71.58%	108	28.42%
White	2,113	77.31%	620	22.69%
Whitfield	3,069	76.32%	952	23.68%
Wilcox	389	77.18%	115	22.82%
Wilkes	1,045	79.35%	272	20.65%
Wilkinson	890	77.06%	265	22.94%
Worth	1,189	71.20%	481	28.80%
