= 2004 United States presidential election in Georgia =

- November 2, 2004
- Turnout: 56.8% ▲5.9 pp

Nominee	George W. Bush	John Kerry
Party	Republican	Democratic
Home state	Texas	Massachusetts
Running mate	Dick Cheney	John Edwards
Electoral vote	15	0
Popular vote	1,914,254	1,366,149
Percentage	57.97%	41.37%

Bush
40–50%
50–60%
60–70%
70–80%
80–90%
90–100%
Kerry
40–50%
50–60%
60–70%
70–80%
80–90%
90–100%
Tie/No Data
President before election
George W. Bush
Republican
Elected President
George W. Bush
Republican

The 2004 United States presidential election in Georgia took place on November 2, 2004. Voters chose 15 representatives, or electors to the Electoral College, who voted for president and vice president.

Georgia was won by incumbent President George W. Bush by a 16.60% margin of victory. Prior to the election, all 12 news organizations considered this a state Bush would win, or otherwise a red state. Bush performed almost five points better than he did in 2000. He also won a wide majority of the counties and congressional districts. The results of the state were similar to other states in the South, such as Alabama, Mississippi, Tennessee, Kentucky, and Louisiana. Like those states, the exit polling showed racial polarization as Bush dominated among white voters, which made up almost 70% of the vote, and Kerry dominated among African American voters, which made up 30% of the state's population. Software engineer and talk show host Michael Badnarik (L-TX) would finish third in the popular vote in Georgia, getting 0.56% of the vote, one of his best statewide performances in the nation.

In this election, Georgia voted 14.14% to the right of the nation at-large. Bush remains the last Republican to win Metro Atlanta in a presidential election.

As of 2024, this remains the last time that Georgia has been decided by a double-digit margin in a presidential election. Georgia was one of 10 states that George W. Bush won twice which had only backed George H. W. Bush once. This was the first time that Georgia voted Republican three elections in a row.

Bush became the first of two Republican presidential candidates to win Georgia twice, followed by Donald Trump, and is the only one ever to do so in consecutive elections. (Note: Donald Trump would win the state twice, albeit non-consecutively, in 2016 and 2024.)

== Primaries ==
- 2004 Georgia Democratic primary

== Campaign ==
=== Predictions ===
There were 12 news organizations that made state-by-state predictions of the election. Here are their last predictions before election day.

Source	Ranking
D.C. Political Report	Solid R
Associated Press	Solid R
CNN	Likely R
Cook Political Report	Solid R
Newsweek	Solid R
New York Times	Solid R
Rasmussen Reports	Likely R
Research 2000	Solid R
Washington Post	Likely R
Washington Times	Solid R
Zogby International	Likely R
Washington Dispatch	Likely R

=== Polling ===
Bush won every single pre-election poll and won each by a double-digit margin of victory and with over 50% of the vote. The final 3 polls averaged Bush leading 56% to 41%.

=== Fundraising ===
Bush raised $6,656,076. Kerry raised $2,282,977.

=== Advertising and visits ===
Neither campaign advertised or visited this state during the fall election.

== Analysis ==
Like other Deep South states during the 2004 election, the political demographics of Georgia was based more around the racial majority in each county, with white Georgians voting more Republican and black Georgians voting more Democratic. Democratic dominance in the state occurred in mostly black-majority counties in the region as well the urban center of the city of Atlanta (located mostly in central Fulton County) along with its core suburban counties of Clayton and DeKalb. Athens-Clarke County, home of the University of Georgia, also supported Kerry's bid, largely as a consequence of being a college town with traditionally left-leaning political views. Since just about every other part of Georgia had a majority white population, Republican dominance occurred in just about every other part of the state including suburban Atlanta where a significant portion of the state's population resides. Suburban Atlanta also includes northern Fulton County (the former Milton County area) which despite being part of this heavily urban and majority-minority county, is predominantly-White, suburban, and perhaps the most affluent area in the state of Georgia. This area also voted heavily in favor of Republican presidential incumbent George W. Bush.

In other down ballot races, Republicans gained Georgia's Class III U.S. Senate seat which was then held by Zell Miller (D) with Johnny Isakson's (R) victory in the open seat race to succeed him and also gained control of the Georgia House of Representatives, and thus control of both houses of the Georgia General Assembly (having already gained control of the Georgia State Senate in 2002), for the first time since Reconstruction. However, despite these achievements, Democrats gained one of Georgia's U.S. House seats with John Barrow's (D) victory over incumbent Representative Max Burns (R).

As of the 2024 presidential election, this is the last election in which the Metro Atlanta counties of Douglas, Rockdale, and Newton—now Democratic strongholds—voted Republican. This is also the last time Sumter County, the home county of former Democratic president Jimmy Carter, voted Republican and the last in which Webster County voted Democratic, as well as the last election in which Georgia was decided by a double-digit margin. Baldwin and Washington counties would not vote Republican again until 2024.

== Results ==
United States presidential election in Georgia, 2004
Party	Candidate	Running mate	Votes	Percentage	Electoral votes
Republican	George W. Bush (incumbent)	Dick Cheney (incumbent)	1,914,254	57.97%	15
Democratic	John Kerry	John Edwards	1,366,149	41.37%	0
Libertarian	Michael Badnarik	Richard Campagna	18,387	0.56%	0
Independent	Ralph Nader (write-in)	Peter Camejo	2,231	0.07%	0
Constitution	Michael Peroutka (write-in)	Chuck Baldwin	580	0.02%	0
Green	David Cobb (write-in)	Pat LaMarche	228	0.01%	0
Republican	Tom Tancredo* (write-in)	N/A	26	0.00%	0
Write-in	John J. Kennedy	N/A	8	0.00%	0
Write-in	David C. Byrne	N/A	7	0.00%	0
Write-in	James Alexander-Pace	N/A	5	0.00%	0
Totals			3,301,875	100.00%	15
Voter turnout (voting-age population)				51.7%	

(*Tancredo was not the Republican Party's nominee in 2004.)

=== By county ===
County	George W. Bush Republican		John Kerry Democratic		Various candidates Other parties		Margin		Total
County	#	%	#	%	#	%	#	%	Total
Appling	4,494	70.52%	1,848	29.00%	31	0.48%	2,646	41.52%	6,373
Atkinson	1,666	67.37%	799	32.31%	8	0.32%	867	35.06%	2,473
Bacon	2,853	75.24%	930	24.53%	9	0.24%	1,923	50.71%	3,792
Baker	821	46.52%	936	53.03%	8	0.46%	-115	-6.51%	1,765
Baldwin	7,709	52.89%	6,775	46.48%	91	0.62%	934	6.41%	14,575
Banks	4,410	78.86%	1,149	20.55%	33	0.59%	3,261	58.31%	5,592
Barrow	13,520	76.17%	4,095	23.07%	135	0.76%	9,425	53.10%	17,750
Bartow	22,311	73.66%	7,741	25.56%	239	0.78%	14,570	48.10%	30,291
Ben Hill	3,331	60.07%	2,180	39.31%	34	0.61%	1,151	20.76%	5,545
Berrien	3,917	69.87%	1,638	29.22%	51	0.91%	2,279	40.65%	5,606
Bibb	28,107	48.64%	29,322	50.74%	359	0.62%	-1,215	-2.10%	57,788
Bleckley	3,167	70.83%	1,281	28.65%	23	0.51%	1,886	42.18%	4,471
Brantley	4,333	77.02%	1,258	22.36%	35	0.62%	3,075	54.66%	5,626
Brooks	2,912	56.91%	2,193	42.86%	12	0.23%	719	14.05%	5,117
Bryan	7,363	73.67%	2,590	25.92%	41	0.41%	4,773	47.75%	9,994
Bulloch	12,252	63.77%	6,840	35.60%	120	0.62%	5,412	28.17%	19,212
Burke	4,232	49.86%	4,213	49.64%	42	0.49%	19	0.22%	8,487
Butts	5,119	66.12%	2,572	33.22%	51	0.66%	2,547	32.90%	7,742
Calhoun	890	44.08%	1,119	55.42%	10	0.50%	-229	-11.34%	2,019
Camden	9,488	66.85%	4,637	32.67%	68	0.48%	4,851	34.18%	14,193
Candler	2,048	64.91%	1,096	34.74%	11	0.35%	952	30.17%	3,155
Carroll	24,837	70.27%	10,224	28.92%	286	0.81%	14,613	41.35%	35,347
Catoosa	16,406	73.43%	5,807	25.99%	128	0.58%	10,599	47.44%	22,341
Charlton	2,311	68.15%	1,064	31.38%	16	0.47%	1,247	36.77%	3,391
Chatham	45,484	49.62%	45,630	49.78%	557	0.61%	-146	-0.16%	91,671
Chattahoochee	905	53.55%	773	45.74%	12	0.71%	132	7.81%	1,690
Chattooga	4,992	63.50%	2,809	35.73%	61	0.78%	2,183	27.77%	7,862
Cherokee	58,238	78.99%	14,824	20.11%	665	0.90%	43,414	58.88%	73,727
Clarke	15,052	40.20%	21,718	58.00%	673	1.80%	-6,666	-17.80%	37,443
Clay	509	38.85%	798	60.92%	3	0.23%	-289	-22.07%	1,310
Clayton	23,106	29.01%	56,113	70.46%	424	0.53%	-33,007	-41.45%	79,643
Clinch	1,501	66.18%	750	33.07%	17	0.75%	751	33.11%	2,268
Cobb	173,467	61.94%	103,955	37.12%	2,639	0.94%	69,512	24.82%	280,061
Coffee	8,306	67.35%	3,979	32.26%	48	0.39%	4,327	35.09%	12,333
Colquitt	8,296	70.59%	3,378	28.74%	78	0.67%	4,918	41.85%	11,752
Columbia	35,549	75.31%	11,442	24.24%	212	0.44%	24,107	51.07%	47,203
Cook	3,065	63.56%	1,733	35.94%	24	0.49%	1,332	27.62%	4,822
Coweta	31,682	74.36%	10,647	24.99%	280	0.66%	21,035	49.37%	42,609
Crawford	2,830	64.20%	1,552	35.21%	26	0.59%	1,278	28.99%	4,408
Crisp	3,865	61.80%	2,357	37.69%	32	0.51%	1,508	24.11%	6,254
Dade	4,368	69.83%	1,823	29.14%	64	1.02%	2,545	40.69%	6,255
Dawson	6,649	81.87%	1,407	17.33%	65	0.80%	5,242	64.54%	8,121
Decatur	5,348	59.71%	3,577	39.94%	31	0.35%	1,771	19.77%	8,956
DeKalb	73,570	26.58%	200,787	72.55%	2,414	0.87%	-127,217	-45.97%	276,771
Dodge	4,584	65.52%	2,384	34.08%	28	0.40%	2,200	31.44%	6,996
Dooly	1,853	48.18%	1,973	51.30%	20	0.52%	-120	-3.12%	3,846
Dougherty	13,711	40.70%	19,805	58.79%	171	0.51%	-6,094	-18.09%	33,687
Douglas	25,846	61.36%	15,997	37.98%	281	0.67%	9,849	23.38%	42,124
Early	2,495	59.14%	1,701	40.32%	23	0.54%	794	18.82%	4,219
Echols	757	76.39%	231	23.31%	3	0.30%	526	53.08%	991
Effingham	12,503	77.26%	3,613	22.33%	66	0.41%	8,890	54.93%	16,182
Elbert	4,626	60.33%	2,984	38.91%	58	0.76%	1,642	21.42%	7,668
Emanuel	4,666	62.44%	2,774	37.12%	33	0.44%	1,892	25.32%	7,473
Evans	2,291	65.16%	1,213	34.50%	12	0.34%	1,078	30.66%	3,516
Fannin	6,862	71.01%	2,727	28.22%	75	0.77%	4,135	42.79%	9,664
Fayette	37,346	70.97%	14,887	28.29%	391	0.74%	22,459	42.68%	52,624
Floyd	21,400	67.56%	10,038	31.69%	238	0.75%	11,362	35.87%	31,676
Forsyth	47,267	83.04%	9,201	16.17%	451	0.79%	38,066	66.87%	56,919
Franklin	5,218	69.43%	2,245	29.87%	52	0.69%	2,973	39.56%	7,515
Fulton	134,372	39.90%	199,436	59.23%	2,933	0.87%	-65,064	-19.33%	336,741
Gilmer	7,414	73.97%	2,510	25.04%	99	0.99%	4,904	48.93%	10,023
Glascock	1,016	80.00%	250	19.69%	4	0.31%	766	60.31%	1,270
Glynn	18,608	67.08%	8,962	32.31%	169	0.61%	9,646	34.77%	27,739
Gordon	11,671	73.88%	4,028	25.50%	98	0.62%	7,643	48.38%	15,797
Grady	5,068	61.80%	3,092	37.70%	41	0.50%	1,976	24.10%	8,201
Greene	4,069	59.17%	2,774	40.34%	34	0.49%	1,295	18.83%	6,877
Gwinnett	160,445	65.66%	81,708	33.44%	2,190	0.99%	78,737	32.22%	244,343
Habersham	10,434	78.59%	2,750	20.71%	92	0.69%	7,684	57.88%	13,276
Hall	38,883	78.09%	10,514	21.12%	395	0.79%	28,369	56.97%	49,792
Hancock	822	23.12%	2,715	76.37%	18	0.51%	-1,893	-53.25%	3,555
Haralson	7,703	75.45%	2,434	23.84%	72	0.71%	5,269	51.61%	10,209
Harris	8,878	71.82%	3,400	27.50%	84	0.68%	5,478	44.32%	12,362
Hart	5,500	60.89%	3,479	38.52%	53	0.59%	2,021	22.37%	9,032
Heard	2,788	70.48%	1,148	29.02%	20	0.51%	1,640	41.46%	3,956
Henry	42,759	66.57%	21,096	32.84%	380	0.59%	21,663	33.73%	64,235
Houston	29,862	66.03%	15,054	33.29%	310	0.68%	14,808	32.74%	45,226
Irwin	2,347	68.67%	1,051	30.75%	20	0.59%	1,296	37.92%	3,418
Jackson	12,611	77.84%	3,468	21.40%	123	0.76%	9,143	56.44%	16,202
Jasper	3,157	66.56%	1,558	32.85%	28	0.59%	1,599	33.71%	4,743
Jeff Davis	3,549	73.25%	1,277	26.36%	19	0.39%	2,272	46.89%	4,845
Jefferson	3,066	46.89%	3,447	52.71%	26	0.40%	-381	-5.82%	6,539
Jenkins	1,898	55.74%	1,494	43.88%	13	0.38%	404	11.86%	3,405
Johnson	2,279	64.11%	1,263	35.53%	13	0.37%	1,016	28.58%	3,555
Jones	6,939	63.91%	3,855	35.50%	64	0.59%	3,084	28.41%	10,858
Lamar	4,027	61.96%	2,432	37.42%	40	0.62%	1,595	24.54%	6,499
Lanier	1,641	63.38%	931	35.96%	17	0.65%	710	27.42%	2,589
Laurens	10,883	63.05%	6,281	36.39%	97	0.66%	4,602	26.66%	17,261
Lee	8,201	78.64%	2,182	20.92%	45	0.43%	6,019	57.72%	10,428
Liberty	6,131	47.86%	6,619	51.67%	59	0.46%	-488	-3.81%	12,809
Lincoln	2,309	63.12%	1,337	36.55%	12	0.33%	972	26.57%	3,658
Long	1,994	65.57%	1,033	33.97%	14	0.46%	961	31.60%	3,041
Lowndes	18,981	59.91%	12,516	39.50%	187	0.59%	6,465	20.41%	31,684
Lumpkin	6,690	75.35%	2,091	23.55%	105	1.18%	4,599	51.80%	8,878
Macon	1,851	38.72%	2,906	60.79%	23	0.48%	-1,055	-22.07%	4,780
Madison	7,254	73.60%	2,527	25.64%	75	0.76%	4,727	47.96%	9,856
Marion	1,670	56.48%	1,275	43.12%	12	0.41%	395	13.36%	2,957
McDuffie	4,846	62.29%	2,899	37.26%	35	0.45%	1,947	25.03%	7,780
McIntosh	2,837	52.71%	2,523	46.88%	22	0.40%	314	5.83%	5,382
Meriwether	4,402	53.98%	3,709	45.48%	44	0.54%	693	8.50%	8,155
Miller	1,694	69.37%	736	30.14%	12	0.49%	958	39.23%	2,442
Mitchell	3,885	53.42%	3,360	46.20%	27	0.37%	525	7.22%	7,272
Monroe	6,522	66.59%	3,216	32.84%	56	0.57%	3,306	33.75%	9,794
Montgomery	2,150	67.82%	1,007	31.77%	13	0.41%	1,143	36.05%	3,170
Morgan	4,902	67.64%	2,304	31.79%	41	0.57%	2,598	35.85%	7,247
Murray	7,745	72.38%	2,899	27.09%	56	0.52%	4,846	45.29%	10,700
Muscogee	30,850	48.16%	32,867	51.31%	335	0.52%	-2,017	-3.15%	64,052
Newton	18,095	61.99%	10,939	37.47%	157	0.54%	7,156	24.52%	29,191
Oconee	10,276	72.37%	3,789	26.68%	134	0.94%	6,487	45.69%	14,199
Oglethorpe	3,688	65.41%	1,899	33.68%	51	0.91%	1,789	31.73%	5,638
Paulding	30,843	76.13%	9,420	23.25%	251	0.62%	21,423	52.88%	40,514
Peach	4,554	53.24%	3,961	46.31%	39	0.46%	593	6.93%	8,554
Pickens	8,115	76.28%	2,444	22.97%	80	0.75%	5,671	53.31%	10,639
Pierce	4,680	78.99%	1,234	20.83%	11	0.19%	3,446	58.16%	5,925
Pike	5,193	76.94%	1,506	22.31%	50	0.74%	3,687	54.63%	6,749
Polk	8,467	68.17%	3,868	31.14%	85	0.68%	4,599	37.03%	12,420
Pulaski	2,202	62.61%	1,294	36.79%	21	0.60%	908	25.82%	3,517
Putnam	5,188	63.91%	2,880	35.48%	50	0.62%	2,308	28.43%	8,118
Quitman	409	42.38%	543	56.27%	13	1.35%	-134	-13.89%	965
Rabun	4,650	70.00%	1,918	28.87%	75	1.13%	2,732	41.13%	6,643
Randolph	1,418	46.49%	1,612	52.85%	20	0.66%	-194	-6.36%	3,050
Richmond	29,764	42.90%	39,262	56.59%	350	0.51%	-9,498	-13.69%	69,376
Rockdale	18,856	60.42%	12,136	38.89%	214	0.69%	6,720	21.53%	31,206
Schley	1,063	69.39%	464	30.29%	5	0.33%	599	39.10%	1,532
Screven	3,360	56.68%	2,534	42.75%	34	0.57%	826	13.93%	5,928
Seminole	1,977	60.26%	1,278	38.95%	26	0.79%	699	21.31%	3,281
Spalding	13,461	63.99%	7,460	35.46%	115	0.55%	6,001	28.53%	21,036
Stephens	6,904	71.37%	2,714	28.05%	56	0.57%	4,190	43.32%	9,674
Stewart	797	39.22%	1,220	60.04%	15	0.74%	-423	-20.82%	2,032
Sumter	5,688	50.35%	5,562	49.23%	48	0.43%	126	1.12%	11,298
Talbot	1,103	37.43%	1,830	62.10%	14	0.48%	-727	-24.67%	2,947
Taliaferro	335	35.23%	612	64.35%	4	0.42%	-277	-29.12%	951
Tattnall	4,657	71.93%	1,787	27.60%	30	0.46%	2,870	44.33%	6,474
Taylor	1,912	56.52%	1,458	43.10%	13	0.39%	454	13.42%	3,383
Telfair	2,171	57.49%	1,590	42.11%	15	0.40%	581	15.38%	3,776
Terrell	1,859	48.58%	1,951	50.98%	17	0.45%	-92	-2.40%	3,827
Thomas	9,659	61.39%	5,997	38.12%	77	0.49%	3,662	23.27%	15,733
Tift	8,619	68.75%	3,864	30.82%	54	0.44%	4,755	37.93%	12,537
Toombs	6,196	70.25%	2,567	29.10%	57	0.65%	3,629	41.15%	8,820
Towns	3,823	72.34%	1,430	27.06%	32	0.60%	2,393	45.28%	5,285
Treutlen	1,691	61.22%	1,052	38.09%	19	0.69%	639	23.13%	2,762
Troup	14,183	64.65%	7,630	34.78%	126	0.57%	6,553	29.87%	21,939
Turner	1,815	61.21%	1,135	38.28%	15	0.51%	680	22.93%	2,965
Twiggs	2,112	48.34%	2,220	50.81%	37	0.85%	-108	-2.47%	4,369
Union	6,847	74.06%	2,327	25.17%	71	0.77%	4,520	48.89%	9,245
Upson	6,634	65.72%	3,424	33.92%	36	0.36%	3,210	31.80%	10,094
Walker	15,340	71.34%	5,986	27.84%	176	0.82%	9,354	43.50%	21,502
Walton	21,594	78.11%	5,887	21.29%	166	0.60%	15,707	56.82%	27,647
Ware	7,790	68.99%	3,449	30.55%	52	0.46%	4,341	38.44%	11,291
Warren	1,121	45.04%	1,360	54.64%	8	0.32%	-239	-9.60%	2,489
Washington	4,081	51.93%	3,733	47.51%	44	0.56%	348	4.42%	6,691
Wayne	6,819	71.31%	2,683	28.06%	60	0.63%	4,136	43.25%	9,562
Webster	485	48.12%	515	51.09%	8	0.80%	-30	-2.97%	1,008
Wheeler	1,192	58.03%	847	41.24%	15	0.73%	345	16.79%	2,054
White	7,403	77.89%	2,016	21.21%	85	0.89%	5,387	56.68%	9,504
Whitfield	19,297	73.10%	6,933	26.26%	169	0.74%	12,364	46.84%	26,399
Wilcox	1,705	65.18%	902	34.48%	9	0.34%	803	30.70%	2,616
Wilkes	2,490	54.75%	2,028	44.59%	30	0.66%	462	10.16%	4,548
Wilkinson	2,261	50.04%	2,235	49.47%	22	0.49%	26	0.57%	4,518
Worth	5,105	69.40%	2,219	30.17%	32	0.44%	2,886	39.23%	7,356
Totals	1,914,254	57.93%	1,366,149	41.34%	24,078	0.73%	548,105	16.59%	3,304,481

==== Counties that flipped from Democratic to Republican ====
- Burke (largest municipality: Waynesboro)
- Chattahoochee (largest municipality: Cusseta)
- McIntosh (largest municipality: Darien)
- Meriwether (largest municipality: Manchester)
- Mitchell (largest municipality: Camilla)
- Peach (largest municipality: Fort Valley)
- Telfair (largest municipality: McRae-Helena)
- Washington (largest municipality: Sandersville)
- Wilkinson (largest municipality: Gordon)

==== Counties that flipped from Republican to Democratic ====
- Chatham (largest municipality: Savannah)

=== By congressional district ===
Bush won nine of 13 congressional districts, including two held by Democrats.

District	Bush	Kerry	Representative
1st	68%	32%	Jack Kingston
2nd	54%	46%	Sanford Bishop
3rd	56%	44%	Jim Marshall
4th	27%	72%	Denise Majette
4th	27%	72%	Cynthia McKinney
5th	27%	73%	John Lewis
6th	70%	29%	Johnny Isakson
6th	70%	29%	Tom Price
7th	73%	26%	John Linder
8th	72%	27%	Lynn Westmoreland
9th	72%	27%	Charlie Norwood
10th	76%	23%	Nathan Deal
11th	55%	45%	Phil Gingrey
12th	47%	53%	Max Burns
12th	47%	53%	John Barrow
13th	36%	64%	David Scott

== Electors ==
Technically the voters of Georgia cast their ballots for electors: representatives to the Electoral College. Georgia is allocated 15 electors because it has 13 congressional districts and 2 senators. All candidates who appear on the ballot or qualify to receive write-in votes must submit a list of 15 electors, who pledge to vote for their candidate and his or her running mate. Whoever wins the majority of votes in the state is awarded all 15 electoral votes. Their chosen electors then vote for president and vice president. Although electors are pledged to their candidate and running mate, they are not obligated to vote for them. An elector who votes for someone other than his or her candidate is known as a faithless elector.

The electors of each state and the District of Columbia met on December 13, 2004, to cast their votes for president and vice president. The Electoral College itself never meets as one body. Instead the electors from each state and the District of Columbia met in their respective capitols.

The following were the members of the Electoral College from the state. All were pledged to and voted for George W. Bush and Dick Cheney.

1. Anna R. Cablik
2. Fred Cooper
3. Nancy N. Coverdell
4. James C. Edenfield
5. Karen Handel
6. Donald F. Layfield
7. Carolyn Dodgen Meadows
8. Sunny K. Park
9. Alec Poitevint
10. Joan Ransom
11. Nardender G. Reddy
12. Jame Raynolds
13. Norma Mountain Rogers
14. Eric Tanenblatt
15. Virgil Williams
