= Flag of Georgia (U.S. state) =

U.S. state flag

Georgia
- Use: Civil and state flag
- Proportion: 2:3, 3:5, or 5:8
- Adopted: February 19, 2003; 23 years ago
- Design: Three horizontal stripes alternating red, white, red; in the canton, 13 white stars encircling the state's coat of arms on a blue field

The flag of the U.S. state of Georgia bears three horizontal stripes (a red-white-red triband) and features a blue canton containing a ring of 13 white stars that encircle the state's gold-colored coat of arms, with the motto of the United States, "In God We Trust", below. Its current iteration was adopted on February 19, 2003.

The overall design is based on the First National Flag of the Confederacy, which was nicknamed the "Stars and Bars". Since Mississippi's vote to change their flag design in 2020, the Georgia flag remains one of the few state flags with references to the Confederacy. It is one of three U.S. state flags to include the United States national motto, "In God We Trust", the other two being those of Florida and Mississippi.

== Design specifications ==
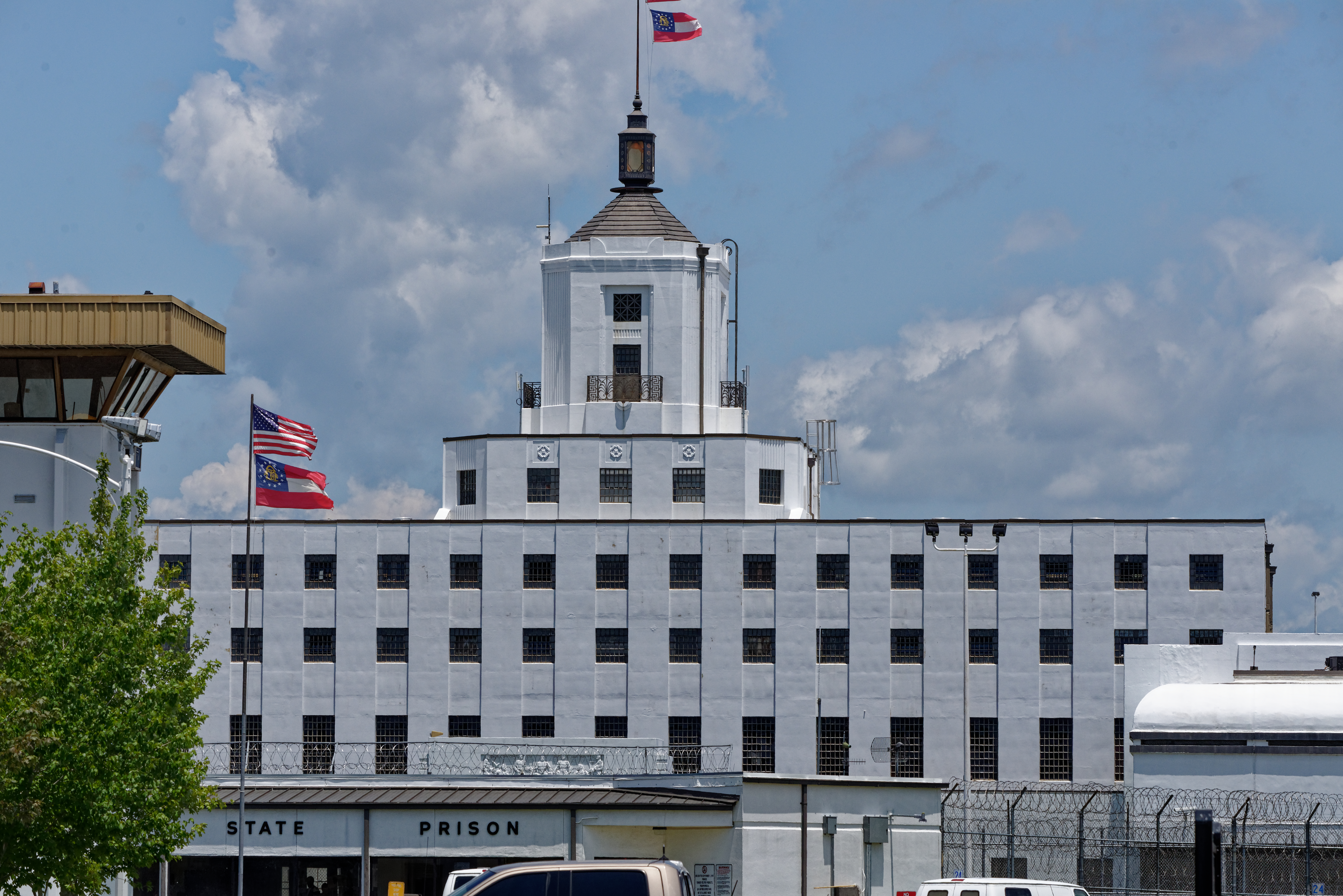
The state flag being flown under the national flag at Georgia State Prison.

Georgia Code § 50-3-1 (2024) states that the flag of the State of Georgia shall consist of:

A square canton on a field of three horizontal bands of equal width. The top and bottom bands shall be scarlet and the center band white. The bottom band shall extend the entire length of the flag, while the center and top bands shall extend from the canton to the fly end of the flag. The canton of the flag shall consist of a square of blue the width of two of the bands, in the upper left of the hoist of the flag. In the center of the canton shall be placed a representation in gold of the coat of arms of Georgia as shown in the center of the obverse of the great seal of the State of Georgia adopted in 1799 and amended in 1914. Centered immediately beneath the coat of arms shall be the words ‘IN GOD WE TRUST’ in capital letters. The coat of arms and wording ‘IN GOD WE TRUST’ shall be encircled by 13 white five-pointed stars.

The statute further specifies that:

Official specifications of the flag, including color identification system, type sizes and fonts, and overall dimensions, shall be established by the Secretary of State.

== History ==
=== Pre-official flags (before 1879) ===
Georgia had no official state flag until 1879. With the state's secession from the Union on January 19, 1861, several different banners were spoken of as the state's flag. One of these was the so-called "Bonnie Blue Flag," which displayed a single white star on a deep blue background. Another was the flag raised over the Savannah Custom House on February 1. It was described in a local newspaper as follows:

The flag is white, bordered with red. In the centre of the white field is represented the Coat of Arms of Georgia. Five red stars, with the blue star of Georgia at the top of the temple, and surrounded with a glory from the curve of the arch extending from the two lower corners of the flag. Over all is the All-seeing Eye. By this arrangement, while the coat of arms of our own State is the prominent feature of the banner, the seceding States, as they may come into the constellation of our Southern Confederacy, will find their appropriate places in the arch of strength or the bow of promise that spans our glorious banner of free and independent Georgia.

The Georgia Code of 1861 required that militia regiments and battalions detailed for service outside of Georgia be provided with regimental colors "bearing the arms of the State". Regimental colors were to be inscribed with name of the unit. The color of the flag itself was not specified. A surviving state flag in the collection of the American Civil War Museum in Richmond, however, places the arms on a red field.

Colors of militia regiments	State flag (de facto)

=== First official flag (1879–1956) ===
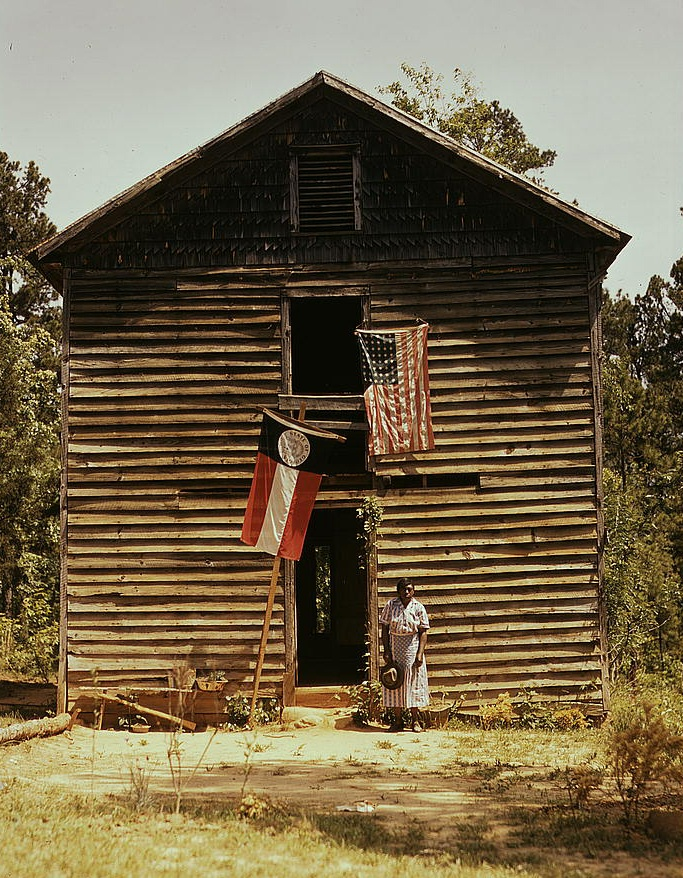
Georgia and United States flags on the side of a building near White Plains, c. 1941.

The Confederacy's Stars-and-Bars banner is the basis for both the first and the latest incarnations of the Georgian state flags.

The 1879 flag was introduced by Georgia state senator Herman H. Perry and was adopted to memorialize Confederate soldiers during the American Civil War. Perry was a former colonel in the Confederate army during the war, and he presumably based the design on the First National Flag of the Confederacy, commonly known as the Stars and Bars. Over the years the flag was changed by adding and altering a charge on the vertical blue band at the hoist. The original 1879 design featured a solid blue band with no additional emblems.

A 1902 amendment to the state militia laws added the state's coat of arms to the blue band, though a 2000 research report by the Georgia Senate states that researchers were not aware of any surviving flags depicting the coat of arms directly on the blue band, suggesting that no such flag was ever actually produced. Instead, no later than 1904, the coat of arms began to be depicted on a white shield, possibly with a gold outline. This version also added a red ribbon with the word "GEORGIA" below the shield. Examples of this modified version were discovered by the Senate researchers.

Some flag manufacturers included the year 1799 in the coat of arms, as in the state seal; the seal had been adopted in that year. In 1914, the General Assembly changed the year to 1776, the year the United States Declaration of Independence was signed.

At some point, the coat of arms began to be replaced with the state seal. The Senate report indicates this happened sometime in the 1910s or 1920s, and may have been connected to the 1914 change in the state seal's date and the need to conform newly produced flags to that change. The report notes that the first official state publication to use the seal instead of the coat of arms was the 1927 Georgia Official Register, which used a color version of the seal, adding that various versions of the seal were used on flags during this era, until a new drawing was prescribed in the 1950s.

State flag (1879–1902)	State flag (1902–1906)	State flag (1906–1920s)	State flag (1920s–1956)

=== Second flag (1956–2001) ===
State flag (1956–2001)

In early 1955, chairman of the State Democratic Party and attorney for the Association County Commissioners of Georgia John Sammons Bell (who later served as a judge on the Georgia Court of Appeals) suggested a new state flag for Georgia that would incorporate the Confederate Battle Flag. At the 1956 session of the General Assembly, state senators Jefferson Lee Davis and Willis Harden introduced Senate Bill 98 to change the state flag. Signed into law on February 13, 1956, the bill became effective on July 1 of that year.

A copy of the new flag displayed at the 1956 signing ceremony shows slight differences from the state flag commonly produced (and shown here). In the 1956 version, the stars are larger, and only the center point of the central star points straight up. Also, the first copies of the 1956 flag used a different version of the state seal. (The 1920 Georgia State Seal was the state seal seen on these early examples. This is the seal seen on all later 1920 Design Georgia State Flags.) In the summer of 1954, a new redrawn state seal began to appear on state government documents. By the end of the decade, flag makers were using the new seal on Georgia's official state flags.

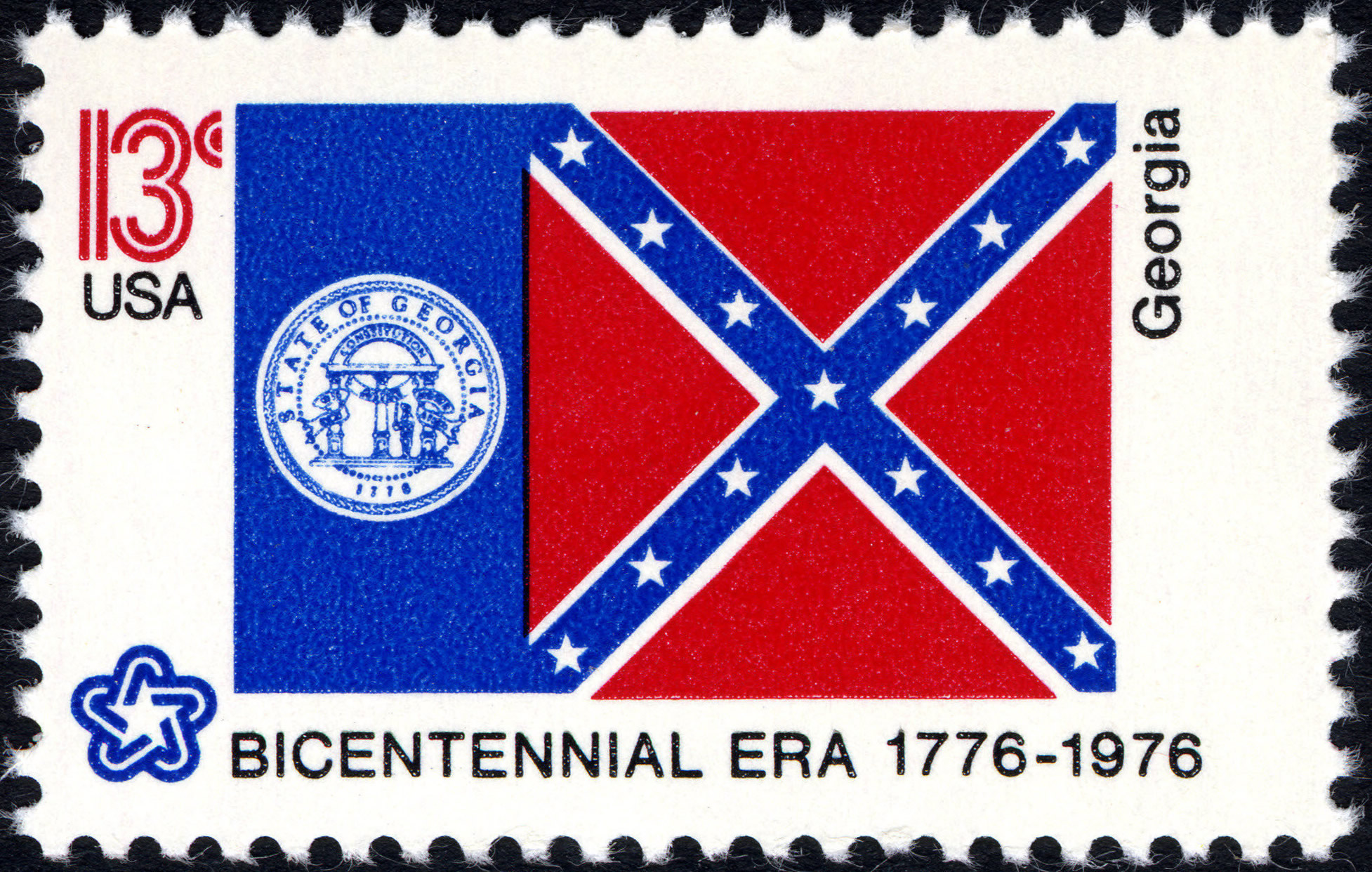
The Georgia state flag as depicted in the 1976 bicentennial postage stamp series

Confederate Battle Flag of the Army of Northern Virginia

The 1956 flag was adopted in an era when the Georgia General Assembly "was entirely devoted to passing legislation that would preserve segregation and white supremacy", according to a 2000 research report by the Georgia Senate. There are few written records of what was said on the Georgia House and Senate floors when the 1956 flag bill was introduced and passed by the Georgia legislature, nor does Georgia state law provide for a statement of legislative intent when a bill is introduced, although former U.S. congressman James Mackay, one of the 32 House members who opposed the change, later said, "There was only one reason for putting the flag on there: like the gun rack in the back of a pickup truck, it telegraphs a message." Additionally, the 2000 report concluded that the "1956 General Assembly changed the state flag" during "an atmosphere of preserving segregation and resentment" to the U.S. government's rulings on integration.

The 2000 report states that the people who had supported the flag's change in 1956 said, in recalling the event years later, that "the change was made in preparation for the Civil War centennial, which was five years away; or that the change was made to commemorate and pay tribute to the Confederate veterans of the Civil War." Bell, who designed the 1956 flag and supported its adoption during the 1950s as a defense of the state's "institutions", which at the time included segregation, claimed years later that he did so to honor the Confederates. The 2000 report states that the claims that the flag was ostensibly changed in 1956 to honor Confederate soldiers came much later after the flag's adoption, in an attempt by the change's supporters to backtrack from prior support of segregation in an era where it was no longer acceptable, saying that the "argument that the flag was changed in 1956 in preparation for the approaching Civil War centennial appears to be a retrospective or after-the-fact argument" and that "no one in 1956, including the flag's sponsors, claimed that the change was in anticipation of the coming anniversary".

At the time, opposition to changing the flag came from various sides, including Confederate historical groups like the United Daughters of the Confederacy (UDC). Opponents to a change of the flag stated that incorporating the Confederate battle flag into the design would be too sectionalist and divisive, saying that people should show patriotism towards the United States rather than the defunct Confederacy, referring to the U.S. Pledge of Allegiance, which states that the U.S. is "one nation ... indivisible". Opponents of the flag's change also said that there was nothing wrong with the 1920 flag and that people were content with it. Others opposed changing the flag out of the burden it would place on those who would have to purchase a new flag to replace the outdated one.

The 2000 Georgia senate report and other critics have interpreted the adoption of the 1956 flag as a symbol of racist protest, citing legislation passed in 1956 which included bills rejecting Brown v. Board of Education and pro-segregationist comments by then-Governor Marvin Griffin, such as "The rest of the nation is looking to Georgia for the lead in segregation."

Political pressure for a change in the official state flag increased during the 1990s, in particular during the run-up to the 1996 Olympic Games that were held in Atlanta. The National Association for the Advancement of Colored People (NAACP) focused on the Georgia state flag as a major issue and some business leaders in Georgia felt that the perceptions of the flag were causing economic harm to the state. In 1992, Governor Zell Miller announced his intention to get the Confederate element removed, but the state legislature refused to pass any flag-modifying legislation. The matter was dropped after the 1993 legislative session. Many Atlanta residents and some Georgia politicians refused to fly the 1956 flag and flew the pre-1956 flag instead. The controversy extended outside of the borders of Georgia, with New York governor George Pataki removing the Georgia flag from an Albany display in protest, and two Georgia state senators removing the New York flag from the Georgia state house in retaliation.

=== Third flag (2001–2003) ===
State flag (2001–2003)

Miller's successor as governor, Roy Barnes, responded to increasing calls for a new state flag, and in 2001 hurried a replacement through the Georgia General Assembly. His new flag, designed by architect Cecil Alexander, sought a compromise, by featuring small versions of some (but not all) of Georgia's former flags, including the controversial 1956 flag, under the words "Georgia's History". Those flags include a thirteen-star U.S. flag of the "Betsy Ross" design; the first Georgia flag (before 1879); the 1920–1956 Georgia flag; the prior state flag (1956–2001); and the current fifty-star U.S. flag.

In a 2001 survey of state and provincial flags in North America conducted by the North American Vexillological Association, the redesigned Georgia flag was ranked the worst by a wide margin. The group stated that the flag "violates all the principles of good flag design". After the 1956 state flag was replaced in 2001, the Georgia city of Trenton adopted a modified version as its official city flag in protest that is still their current city flag. Similarly, Mount Zion, Georgia also adopted a modified version as its official city flag that is also their current city flag.

There was widespread opposition to the new flag, pejoratively referred to as the "Barnes rag". It led, according to Barnes himself, to his defeat for reelection two years later; the flag was a major issue in the election.

=== Fourth flag (2003–present) ===
State flag (2003–present)

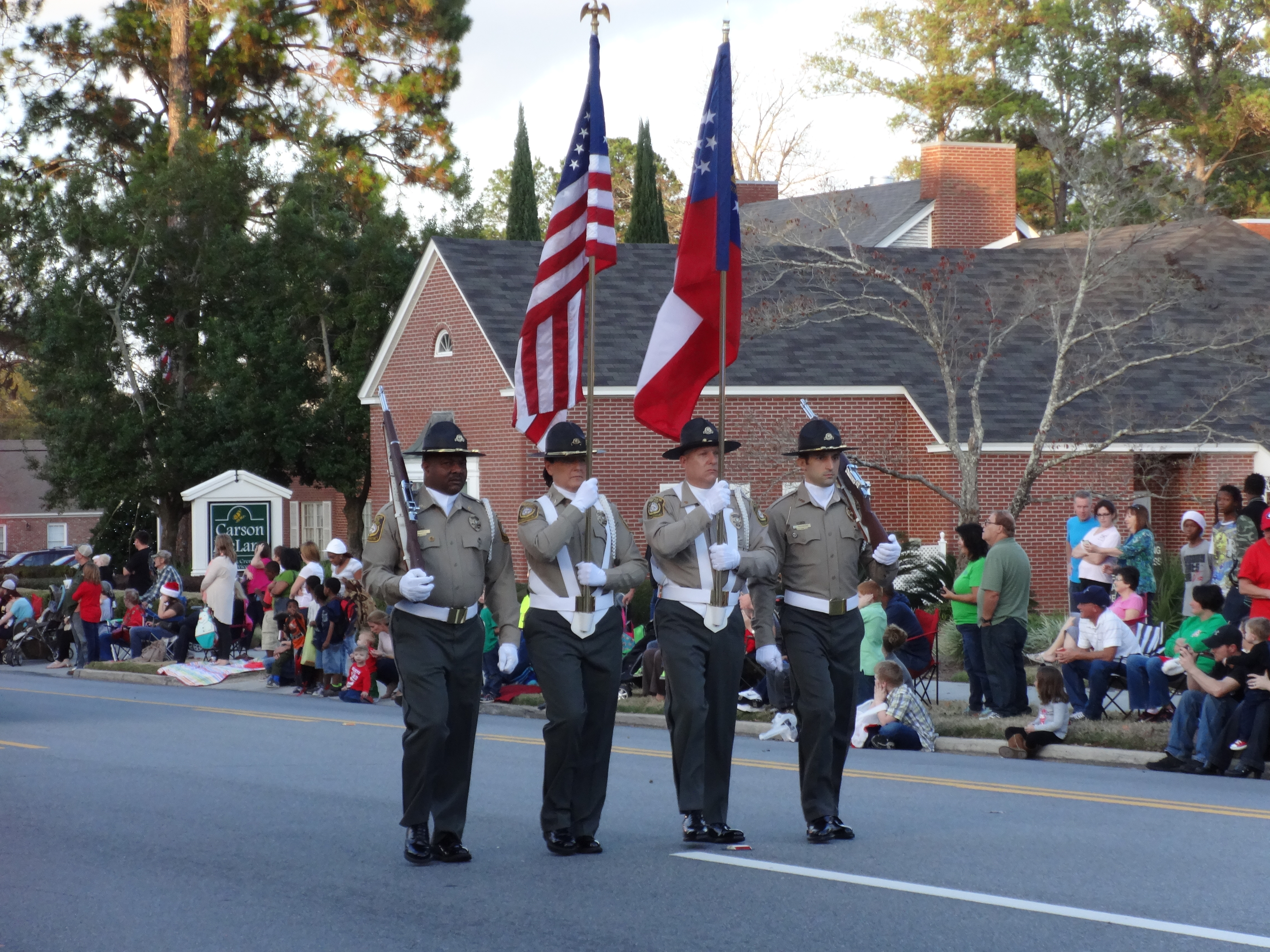
A member of a police color guard, second from right, carries the Georgia flag at Valdosta, December 6, 2014.

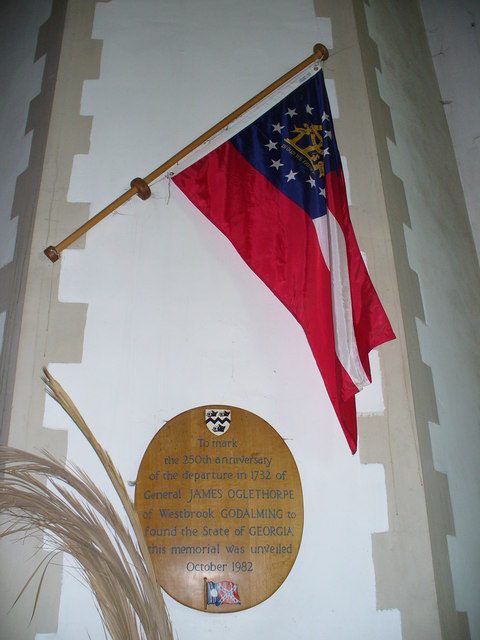
The current flag of Georgia above a plaque. The plaque has the 1956–2001 flag depicted on it.

In 2002, Sonny Perdue was elected governor of Georgia, partially on a platform of allowing Georgians to choose their own flag in a state referendum. He authorized the Georgia legislature to design a new flag in 2003.

The Georgia General Assembly's proposed flag was based on the First National Flag of the Confederacy, the Stars and Bars, which was less known than the Confederate battle flag, with a symbol based on the state's coat of arms and the words "In God We Trust" placed within the circle of stars. Perdue signed the legislation into law on February 19, 2003.

The ring of stars that encompass the state's coat of arms represents Georgia as one of the original Thirteen Colonies. The arch symbolizes the state's constitution while the pillars represent the three branches of government. The words of the state motto, "Wisdom, Justice, and Moderation", are wrapped around the pillars, guarded by a figure dressed in colonial attire from the American Revolutionary War. Within the arms, a sword is drawn to represent the defense of the state's constitution, with the motto of the United States, "In God We Trust", below.

The 2003 flag legislation also authorized a referendum on which of the two most recent flags (the 2001 and 2003 versions) would be adopted as the flag of the state; the 1956 flag was not an option. The referendum took place during the state's March 2, 2004 presidential primary election. If the 2003 flag was rejected, the pre-2001 design would have been put to a vote. The 2003 design won 73.1% of the vote in the referendum.

== Pledge of Allegiance ==
I pledge allegiance to the Georgia Flag and to the principles for which it stands: Wisdom, Justice, Moderation, and Courage.

— Pledge of allegiance to the Georgia state flag

== Other flags ==
Before the official adoption of a state flag, there were several unofficial designs featuring the state coat of arms. Most of these flags were never recognized by state law.

In 1875 a state flag was displayed at a Civil War Veterans reunion in Virginia, but its design is unknown.

Although the original 1879 design did not have the states coat of arms in the blue field there where variants. In 1881 one of the state's militia was selected the represent the state at the Yorktown Centennial. They carried with them a state flag containing the coat of arms of the state in the center of blue bar.

In 1885, Adjutant General Stephens sent a state flag to Washington D. C. be displayed at Grover Cleveland inauguration. Before the banner was sent off the Governor inspected it, suggesting that the coat of arms of the state should be in the blue bar. Stephens later added the state emblem.

In 1894, the city of Savannah held a large St. Patricks Day Parade. During the march members of the Ancient Order of Hibernians carrying with them a unique banner. It bore a green field with the coat of arms and motto of the state in the middle of it.

In 1897 Adjutant-General Oscar J. Brown sent a new design for the state flag for use by the National Guard. It was similar to the 1879 one but with a thicker blue bar and the coat of arms of the state in the center. Underneath the coat of arms was a ribbon with the word "Georgia."

According to The Rocky Mountain News (Daily), there was a state flag used in 1898 that bore the state's coat of arms. The regimental flag carried by the 2nd Georgia infantry during the Spanish-American War had a blue field with the state's coat of arms in the center.

== See also ==
- List of Georgia state symbols
- List of flags by design
- List of U.S. state, district, and territorial insignia
