= Don Keenan =

American lawyer (born 1951)

Don C. Keenan (born 1951) is an Atlanta, Georgia-based trial lawyer and author. He is the head partner in the Keenan Law Firm, which specializes in cases involving children, including injury, medical malpractice, and wrongful death.

He is most noted for his lawsuits regarding the conditions of foster care in the state of Georgia, which have led to changes in state law regarding abuse in foster families. Keenan served as the national president of the American Board of Trial Advocates and from 1997-1998 as president of the Inner Circle of Advocates. Keenan has won 387 settlements and verdicts of over $1 million. His 2009 book with David Ball, Reptile: The 2009 Manual of the Plaintiff's Revolution helped spawn a nationwide movement amongst plaintiff's lawyers utilizing a legal strategy called the Reptile Theory Strategy.

Keenan was featured in Time magazine on November 5, 2000, in ABA Journal in April 2007, on The O'Reilly Factor on March 15, 2005, and on The Oprah Winfrey Show in 2000, where he was named among Winfrey's "People Who Have the Courage." In 2003, Emory University granted him a Career Achievement Award in the field of public policy and child advocacy. In 2006, he published 365 Ways To Keep Kids Safe, a book of his advice for child safety.

== Legal career ==
Keenan completed the United States Marine Corps Officer Candidate School, but accepted discharge before serving in Vietnam. He attended Atlanta Law School, one of three evening law schools approved by the Georgia Supreme Court. Don was the youngest law school graduate in the State of Georgia at age 21, also in that same year, the youngest law graduate to speak in front of a congressional hearing. His first case started in 1976, Dr. Carl Drury against the Gilman Paper Company. Keenan and lawyer Scott Sanders settled the case in 1982, after the case received national attention from activist Ralph Nader. Between 1982 and 1988, 80 lawsuits were filed against Keenan by his creditors, and he developed a drinking problem. In 1983, he partnered with lawyer David Bills. Bills too later sued Keenan in 1994 for breach of contract and Keenan won.

Keenan initially practiced criminal law, but in 1988 took the case of Kathy Jo Taylor, who was five years old when she was beaten into a coma while in state foster care. The case went to the United States Supreme Court in 1989, who decided against the state. Since then, he has taken on child safety issues related to birth defects, playground construction, air bag function, gun trigger lock programs, and day care related injuries. In 2000, he was brought to national attention with the case of Terrell Peterson, who died in foster care despite warnings to the Department of Family and Children Services. On appeal, the case was decided against the state on April 4, 2002, after it resulted in new legislation regarding the care of foster children in 2000.

His penchant for new Mercedes-Benz cars has led him to be featured in Mercedes Magazine. He also has a taste for Cuban cigars and tailored size 50 suits.

Don Keenan was awarded the prestigious medal of honor by the Ellis Island Foundation in 2007

Don Keenan was the founder of the Edge Trial Advocacy Movement in 2009 and educated 7,000 lawyers in seminars around the country. He has authored a weekly blog to over 5,000 subscribers since 2011. In 2013 he started the Keenan Trial Institute which since its inception has graduated over 1,000 trial lawyers with courses being offered in Atlanta, Dallas, Houston, Oklahoma City, Fort Lauderdale, Seattle, Las Vegas and Phoenix. He is the author of a 6‑volume set titled The Keenan Edge.

== Cases ==
While Keenan said in 2007 that "1986 was the last year the firm closed a file without a recovery", his record has included both ups and downs. His firm has lost cases in that time, such as one in 1999 involving Cobb County pediatricians.

In 1993, he founded the Keenan's Kids Foundation, a charity for at-risk children in Georgia for which Keenan performs pro bono work. They launched the Keenan's Kids Law Center in 2001. In his cases, he is known for both courtroom spectacle and eccentricity in his case preparation, including overnight home visits.

=== Notable successes ===
- Kathy Jo Taylor (1989)
- Terrell Peterson (2002)

== Bibliography ==
- Keenan, Don. 365 Ways To Keep Kids Safe. Balloon Press. 2006 ISBN 0-9774425-3-5
- Ball & Keenan, Reptile: The 2009 Manual of the Plaintiff's Revolution, Balloon Press. 2009, ISBN 9780977442553
