= Terrell Peterson =

Murdered American child (1992–1998)

- The only known photograph of Terrell Peterson while alive, it was taken in a hospital emergency room where he was taken for child abuse related injuries. He was returned to the abusive foster carer and was eventually murdered.
- Born: March 1, 1992; Atlanta, Georgia, U.S.
- Died: January 15, 1998 (aged 5); Hughes Spalding Children's Hospital, Atlanta, Georgia
- Known for: Murder victim

Terrell Peterson (March 1, 1992 – January 15, 1998) was a five-year-old boy from Atlanta, Georgia, who was tortured and beaten to death while his case was under active state supervision. He was one of more than 800 children who died between 1995 and 1998 after their cases were brought to the attention of the Georgia Department of Human Services' (DHS) Division of Family and Children Services (DFCS). Some of the deaths were due to accident and illness, while others, like Terrell's, were murders. When Terrell died, he weighed only 29 pounds and was covered with cuts, bruises and cigarette burns.

Various individuals within the Georgia Department of Family and Children Services engaged in gross misconduct and violation of state-mandated protocols for handling child abuse cases. After the murder, officials within the department engaged in a willful cover-up of the facts in the case. Terrell's case was considered to have been one of the worst cases of child abuse in history.

Lawyer Don Keenan, who sued the state of Georgia on Terrell's behalf, was quoted as saying:

Thank God he was dead. I think anybody (who) would have known or understood what this little guy was going through, would rejoice in his death.

The victim's grandmother, Pharina Peterson, and Terri Lynn Peterson (his aunt) were both convicted of murder and sentenced to life imprisonment.

== Abuse ==
While in his mother's care. the Fulton County Department of Family and Children Services received seven calls between 1992 and 1995 in reference to neglect of Terrell or his siblings:

- The mother was taking drugs while pregnant, using food stamps and welfare checks to buy crack cocaine (May 1992).
- The parents are locking the children in the bedroom on weekends, denying them food and water (August 1993).
- Mother was on drugs, children were unsupervised (February 1994).
- Children are begging neighbors for food, mother was using cocaine daily (January 1995).
- Mother was addicted to crack, leaves children with their sick maternal grandmother (November 1995).

The complaints were handled by 11 different caseworkers, overseen by 10 supervisors at The Georgia Department of Family and Children Services, yet nothing was done until June 1996 when the department took custody of Terrell from his mother.

=== Foster Care ===
According to protocol children taken into custody by child services should ideally be placed with blood relatives, receive at least one in-person visit with an agency caseworker per month and under no circumstances is corporal punishment to be administered by foster carers. Against department rules, Terrell was placed in the care of Pharina Peterson, the grandmother of Terrell's half brother Tommy and half sister Tasha who were not directly related to him. While in her custody agency caseworkers had little to no contact with Terrell and there were no monthly visits.

Terrell was brought to the emergency room of Hughes Spalding Children's Hospital in Atlanta in cardiac arrest, where he subsequently died. At the time of his death, Terrell weighed 29 pounds.

== Investigation ==
During the course of the homicide investigation police discovered that Terrell had been physically restrained with pantyhose tied to a banister in the apartment. According to another child living in the home, Tasha said Peterson tied Terrell up "a lot."

The police also found a set of written instructions for Terrell's care, allegedly authored by Peterson: "He gets a bowl of oatmeal for breakfast, lunch he gets grits, and dinner he gets grits. His hands are always tied."

Terrell's Head Start teacher, Joanne Bryant, found him rummaging in a trash can at school looking for food. This occurred prior to a Thanksgiving Day beating in 1996, which necessitated a trip to the emergency room where he was diagnosed with battered child syndrome.

Pharina Peterson was arrested and indicted on misdemeanor charges. Terrell, who had previously implicated Peterson on record as the one who assaulted him, was scheduled to testify in person at the trial. However, his caseworker, Cheryl Elmore, who was responsible for bringing Terrell to court, never showed up. Terrell's and her absence were never questioned and the charges were dismissed by municipal court judge Catherine E. Malicki because "the victim was not in court".

To cover her already egregious transgression, Elmore concocted a fraudulent backdated internal memo which was placed in Terrell's file; that the trial did indeed occur, no evidence of child abuse was found and the charges were dismissed as a result. The memo stated, "The judge believed Ms. Peterson (and) did not feel she was guilty of child abuse." This alleged finding despite the medical evidence and the results of the police investigation, along with the lack of substantiating court documents, was never questioned by her supervisors. As a result, Terrell was deemed to be "safe," and his file was closed and he was returned to the custody of Peterson. Peggy Peters, director of the department, had this to say, "Again, I can't speak for Miss Elmore" and "I certainly would not have made that decision."

When Terrell went back to the same Head Start class he was in prior to the assault, Bryant, his teacher, noticed he was not walking normally. When she took off his sneakers she noticed that the flesh on the soles of both his feet had been burned off. This was again alleged, posthumously, to have been inflicted by Peterson as retribution for telling authorities about her previous assaults. The burns were severe enough to necessitate skin grafts.

Despite the severity of these injuries, no investigation was done, no charges were brought and Terrell was never visited by anyone from child services from the time of these injuries until his murder a year later. The coroner listed Terrell's cause of death as "blunt impact injuries to the head, trunk and extremities." This resulted in Fran Peterson being charged with capital murder.

== Cover-up ==
After two internal investigations into Terrell's case, Georgia DCFS reported “failure to make contacts," "failure to conduct mandatory monthly meetings," "a serious lack of judgment," and "numerous violations throughout the history of the case." The public was never made aware of these findings and, upon completion of the investigation, department officials engaged in a cover up.

The department made only one public statement which was written by Ralph Mitchell, the administrator of the Atlanta area office. He claimed members of the agency expressed "outrage at the loss of precious life" but that they had responded "immediately and comprehensively" to allegations of Terrell's abuse. The statement further claimed the department had followed protocol, saying "all of (its) steps were followed in the case of Terrell."

Soon after, Mitchell wrote a private memo to the department head at state headquarters stating the press release was "untrue." He also commented it was fortunate no one in the media had called to follow up after the public statement.

Due to state privacy laws, Terrell's records were sealed and inaccessible to the media, rendering the cover up undetectable. The tampering began to come to light one year later when Don Keenan received Terrell's case file through an anonymous individual within the department.

Despite the murder of Terrell, the complicity in his murder through willful neglect of workers at the Georgia Department of Family and Children's Services, and the exposed cover-up by high department officials, another case worker determined that Terrell's half sister and half brother — who were both present at his murder — would be safe with Fran Peterson. This unidentified case worker said as follows: "Ms. Peterson will cooperate with the agency and continue to show interest in the support of the child while they are at home. ... I think, again you'd have to look at the individual situation. And if she had not harmed those other children, then it might be acceptable."

Neither Elmore nor Mitchell were fired for their actions.

== 60 Minutes II ==
The CBS news program 60 Minutes II, noted for investigative journalism, conducted an in-depth investigation into all aspects of the case and aired the results in January 1999.

In the wake of this program, then-Georgia governor Roy Barnes decided to set up a Child Advocate Office with the authority to bypass the state's confidentiality laws and independently investigate and review child abuse cases handled by the Department of Family and Children's Services. Terrell's half brother and sister were placed with another foster family and the Georgia Bureau of Investigation conducted raids on several offices of the Department of Family and Children Services. The Georgia legislature passed the Terrell Peterson Act, which gives doctors the authority to take temporary custody of battered children at the hospital without department approval.

== Aftermath ==
- Pharina Peterson received a life sentence for Terrell's murder.
- In December 2002 Terri Lynn Peterson, the victims' aunt, was found guilty of his murder and sentenced to life imprisonment. She was paroled in July 2026.
- Ralph Mitchell, the official who engaged in a cover-up of the case and wrote the phony press release, retired with a state pension.
- Catherine E. Malicki, who dismissed charges against Pharina Peterson because Terrell was not brought to court, remained a municipal court judge in Atlanta. (retired in 2010)
- Roy Barnes, governor at the time who signed the Terrell Peterson Act, ran for Georgia governor again in 2010 but lost.
