= Reptile Theory Strategy =

Legal strategy

The Reptile Theory strategy is a legal strategy used by plaintiffs' lawyers in the United States of America which centralizes safety issues in order to encourage jurors to issue a favorable verdict for plaintiffs. Essentially, a plaintiff's lawyer utilizing this strategy asks defense-friendly witnesses questions that establish a universal safety rule (e.g., "Do you agree that civil engineers should always design a road safely?"). These questions should be crafted to make the defense witness look unreasonable for disagreeing with the premise. Then, the plaintiff's lawyer asks questions that produce answers which demonstrate the defendant violated this universal safety rule and how that violation threatened the safety of not just the plaintiff but the public at large. The practitioners of this strategy posit that juries will then award Plaintiffs damages if the jury believes the defendant's actions risked the safety of the community that the jury is a member of.

The strategy first rose to prominence with the publication of David Ball and Don Keenan's book, Reptile: The 2009 Manual of the Plaintiff’s Revolution, and created a period of time known in the legal community as the "Reptile Revolution."

== The basis for the Reptile Theory strategy ==
The basis for the Reptile Theory strategy originates from a now-disproven model of the evolution of the vertebrate forebrain and behavior that was first proposed by Paul D. MacLean in the 1960s called the triune brain. According to MacLean, the triune brain consisted of the reptilian complex ("reptile brain"), the paleomammalian complex ("dog brain"), and the neomammalian complex ("ape brain"), viewed each as independently conscious, and as structures sequentially added to the forebrain in the course of evolution. According to the model, the "dog brain" is associated with emotions and memory formation, the "ape brain" is used for high cognitive functions, and the "reptile brain" is responsible for survival and reproduction.

== Reptile: The 2009 Manual of the Plaintiff’s Revolution ==
=== Themes ===
In Reptile: The 2009 Manual of the Plaintiff’s Revolution, Ball and Keenan claim that advocates for tort reform had been the practicing Reptile Theory prior to its use by plaintiffs' attorneys. In essence, these advocates had been telling the public that lawsuits harmed the economy thereby triggering fear in the public.

=== Tactic ===
Attorneys using the Reptile Theory strategy seek to establish three concepts in the jurors' minds:

- the defendant's conduct threatens the community's safety;
- a jury verdict against the defendant will reduce the danger posed by the defendant's conduct; and
- if the jury comes back with a jury favorable to the defendant, the danger in the jurors' community will increase.

== Criticisms ==
The Reptile Theory strategy has been criticized by the defense bar and law professors for several reasons including its lack of a basis in science. For instance, defense attorneys have contended that attorneys utilizing the strategy attempt "to circumvent the applicable legal standard by presenting an alternative 'rule' to the jury."

In a 2010 article, Allen, et al. critiqued the strategy on the following grounds:

- The neuroanatomy theory that serves as the backbone of the strategy is incorrect.
- Attorneys are not able to know which response a given juror may have in response to the introduction of fear into the courtroom.
- Jurors may feel disrespected by Reptile Theory tactics.
