= Roy Barnes =

Governor of Georgia from 1999 to 2003

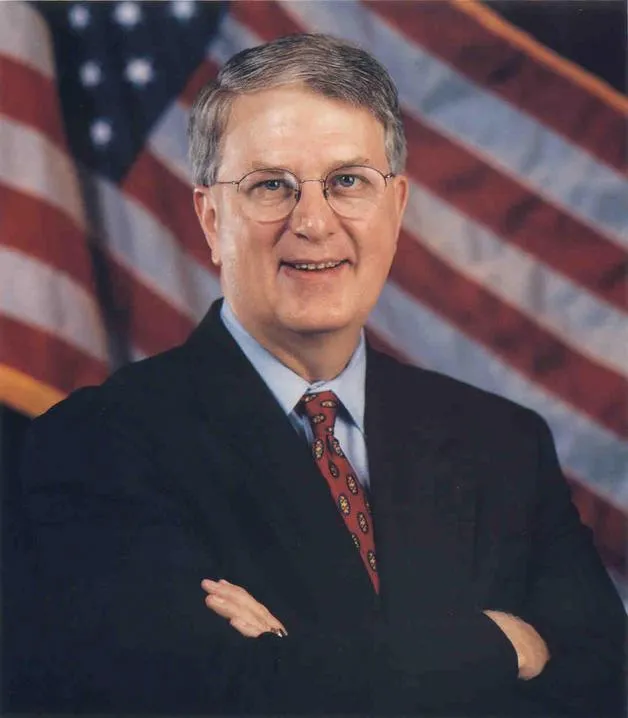
- Official portrait, c. 1999

80th Governor of Georgia
- In office January 11, 1999 – January 13, 2003
- Lieutenant: Mark Taylor
- Preceded by: Zell Miller
- Succeeded by: Sonny Perdue

Member of the Georgia House of Representatives from the 33rd district
- In office January 11, 1993 – January 11, 1999
- Preceded by: Constituency established
- Succeeded by: Don Wix

Member of the Georgia State Senate from the 33rd district
- In office January 13, 1975 – January 14, 1991
- Preceded by: Jack Henderson
- Succeeded by: Steve Thompson

Personal details
- Born: Roy Eugene Barnes; March 11, 1948 (age 78) Mableton, Georgia, U.S.
- Party: Democratic
- Spouse: Marie Dobbs (m. 1970)
- Children: 3
- Education: University of Georgia (BA, JD)

Military service
- Allegiance: United States
- Branch/service: United States Army
- Unit: United States Army Reserves

Roy Eugene Barnes (born March 11, 1948) is an American attorney and politician who served as the 80th governor of Georgia from 1999 to 2003.

A Democratic member of the Georgia Senate from 1974 to 1990, Barnes ran unsuccessfully for governor in 1990, losing to Lieutenant Governor Zell Miller in the Democratic primary. Barnes then served in the Georgia House of Representatives from 1992 to 1998. He ran for governor again in 1998, handily winning the primary and general elections.

In 2003, Barnes was awarded the Profile in Courage Award by the John F. Kennedy Library for his success in minimizing the Confederate battle emblem on the Georgia state flag as governor, despite the political fallout. It is widely believed that his support of the flag change significantly contributed to his re-election defeat in 2002.

After his defeat, he resumed the practice of law and co-chaired the Aspen Institute Commission on No Child Left Behind Act. He returned to politics when he ran for governor again in 2010, losing to Republican Nathan Deal. A decade later, he declined the invitation to act as special counsel in the Georgia election racketeering and fraud case involving former president Donald Trump, and stated, "I told DA Willis that I lived with bodyguards for four years and I didn’t like it, and I wasn’t going to live with bodyguards for the rest of my life."

== Early life, education, and family ==
Roy Barnes was born on March 11, 1948, in Mableton, Georgia. His family owned a general store, which gave him his first exposure to politics as he listened to the conversations of the store patrons.

Upon his graduation from South Cobb High School, Barnes enrolled at the University of Georgia. He was active on the debate team; and spent his summers returning home to work in the family store. He graduated with a degree in history in 1969; and one year later married Marie Dobbs of Marietta, Georgia, with whom he has had three children.

After college, Barnes enrolled in the University of Georgia School of Law. While there, he was elected president of the student bar association, and was named outstanding senior. He graduated from law school in 1972 with honors, and returned to Cobb County to work as a prosecutor in the Cobb County District Attorney's Office after serving four months in the Army.

== Georgia General Assembly ==
=== Georgia Senate ===
Barnes’ political career began in 1974, when he was elected by the citizens of Mableton to the Georgia State Senate. Upon his election, Barnes became the youngest member of the Georgia Senate at age 26. Barnes went on to serve eight terms in the Georgia Senate.

After his second term, he was named floor leader to Governor Joe Frank Harris, and was appointed chair of the Senate Judiciary Committee. During his tenure in the Georgia Senate, he also served on the Senate Appropriations, Rules, and Transportation committees, and had a major leadership role in rewriting the Georgia constitution as chair of the Select Committee on Constitutional Revision.

=== 1990 gubernatorial election ===
After eight terms in the Georgia Senate, Barnes entered the 1990 gubernatorial election. He faced Atlanta Mayor Andrew Young and Lt. Governor Zell Miller in the Democratic Primary. Barnes was defeated by Miller, who later won the election and became an ally of Barnes.

=== Georgia House of Representatives ===
Barnes returned to politics in 1992, when he was elected to the Georgia House of Representatives. He was appointed vice chair of the Judiciary Committee, and chair of the Subcommittee on General Law. During his tenure in the Georgia House, he also served on the Rules and Banks, and Banking Committees.

Barnes was a founding board member of Georgia State Bank located in Mableton, Georgia. He served on the bank's board of directors from 1986 until 1997 when he resigned to run for governor. In addition to Georgia State Bank, Barnes has been involved with other community banks in Georgia.

== Governor of Georgia ==
=== 1998 gubernatorial election ===
In 1998, Barnes ran for governor again, this time defeating Secretary of State Lewis A. Massey to win the Democratic primary. Running on the themes of education reform and health care reform, he defeated Republican businessman Guy Millner in the general election with a victory of 52% to 44% to become the 80th Governor of Georgia.

The Democrats retained control of both houses of the legislature and retained all but two state level offices (Republicans were elected Insurance Commissioner and School Superintendent).

=== Tenure ===
In January 1999 after being elected governor, Barnes’ first act of his new administration was to sign an order banning all lobbyist gifts to the 56,000 employees working in the state government's executive branch.

At Barnes' urging, the legislature voted to change the flag of the state of Georgia, despite vocal opposition. The state flag had featured the Confederate battle emblem since 1956.

Barnes' education reform measures included eliminating tenure for newly hired teachers and ending social promotion by requiring students to pass a test before advancing to the next grade. Teachers did not support his proposals for ending tenure and other protections for new teachers, but Georgia's Department of Education supported his calls for ending social promotion.

Georgia's Child Advocate Office within Georgia's Division of Family and Children Services (DFCS) was established by Barnes as a result of the death of five-year-old Terrell Peterson, whose care was under state supervision at the time of his death. Barnes signed the Terrell Peterson Act to protect children at risk of death due to abuse, also as a result of Peterson's death.

Barnes proposed highway safety measures to curb teen driving in an attempt to save lives of young drivers who are killed in automobile crashes. Barnes proposed a curfew for teens at 10 p.m., a limit on passengers riding in their vehicles, and a ban on 16-year-olds driving without adult supervision in 18 metropolitan Atlanta counties.

Further, Barnes supported the building of the Northern Arc, an outer perimeter north of Atlanta, which met with opposition from locals.

During most of his tenure, State Senator Charles B. Tanksley, served as his floor manager in the Georgia Senate.

=== 2002 gubernatorial election ===
Facing re-election, Barnes lost in an upset in November 2002 as part of a larger Republican midterm sweep. Although some commentators have pointed to the ire of voters opposing the flag change and him upsetting teachers as leading to his defeat, the cause was finally attributed toward a strong shift to GOP within that election cycle across many offices in the State of Georgia, at that time. Barnes was defeated by Sonny Perdue, the first Republican to be elected Governor of Georgia since Reconstruction.

According to the February 2004 issue of Georgia Trend, "Democrat Roy Barnes was one of the most powerful governors in history. His nickname 'King Roy' was an affectionate term accorded him by supporters because he knew how to pull the levers and make things happen in the legislature." Barnes was also known as a powerful 'suburban governor.'

== Return to legal career ==
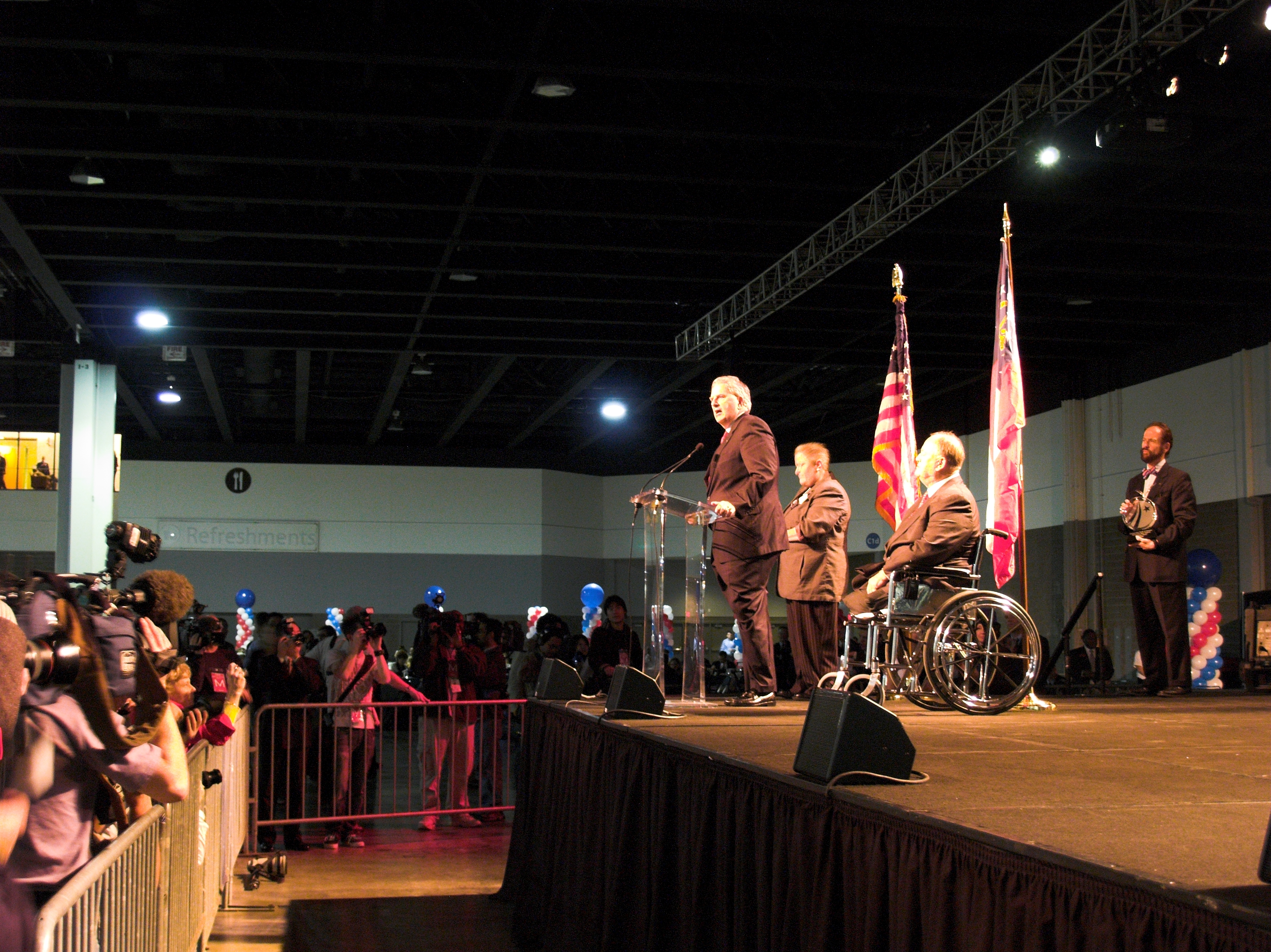
Barnes and former Senator Max Cleland

Following his defeat, Barnes decided to lend his talents to a legal aid organization, the Atlanta Legal Aid Society, Inc., working for six months as a full-time volunteer. During this time, he provided legal advice to indigent clients pro bono, and established a website outlining the rights of consumers: www.myconsumerrights.com.

=== Profile in Courage Award ===
For his leadership in minimizing the Confederate battle emblem on the Georgia state flag despite the political fallout, Barnes was awarded the 2003 Profile in Courage Award by the John F. Kennedy Library.

=== Barnes Law Group ===
Upon completing his service at Atlanta Legal Aid Society, Barnes founded the Barnes Law Group with his daughter, Allison Barnes Salter; son-in-law, John Salter; and long-time law partner, Charles Tanksley. The Barnes Law Group continues Barnes' private law practice which began in 1975 when he formed his first law firm. The American College of Trial Lawyers recognized him as one of the top U.S. trial attorneys.

==== Georgia Supreme Court rulings as attorney ====
The Georgia Supreme Court, on June 11, 2007, unanimously dismissed a legal challenge to the state's voter ID law. Barnes argued before the court that the voter identification law was unconstitutional because Plaintiff Rosalind Lake - a first-time voter after having moved to Georgia - did not have a driver's license, and was therefore excluded in a discriminatory manner.

The state's highest court, however, stated that Lake, the only plaintiff in the case, had photograph identification through MARTA, the area's mass transit system, as a result of needed disability access to it, that would have qualified her to vote in July 2006, so she did not have legal standing to file suit. Justice Harold Melton wrote that since Lake had photograph identification that was acceptable for voting, in-person, under the 2006 Act, she did not have standing to challenge the state's voter identification law as an unconstitutional restriction on her voting rights.

Previously, Georgians could show one of 17 forms of identification, including those without photos, such as utility bills, to check in at the polls. Supporters said it would increase voter confidence through a better verification process. Legislators revised the law and made it easier for people to get free photo cards for voting, but the rules were repeatedly barred from implementation until early 2008.

== Aspen Institute Commission on No Child Left Behind ==
On February 14, 2006, the Aspen Institute announced the forming of the Commission on No Child Left Behind. Barnes, along with former Secretary of Health and Human Services Tommy Thompson, was named co-chair of the commission.

According to its mission, the commission "is a bipartisan effort to identify and build support for improvements in federal education policy to spur academic achievement and close persistent achievement gaps."

== 2010 gubernatorial election ==
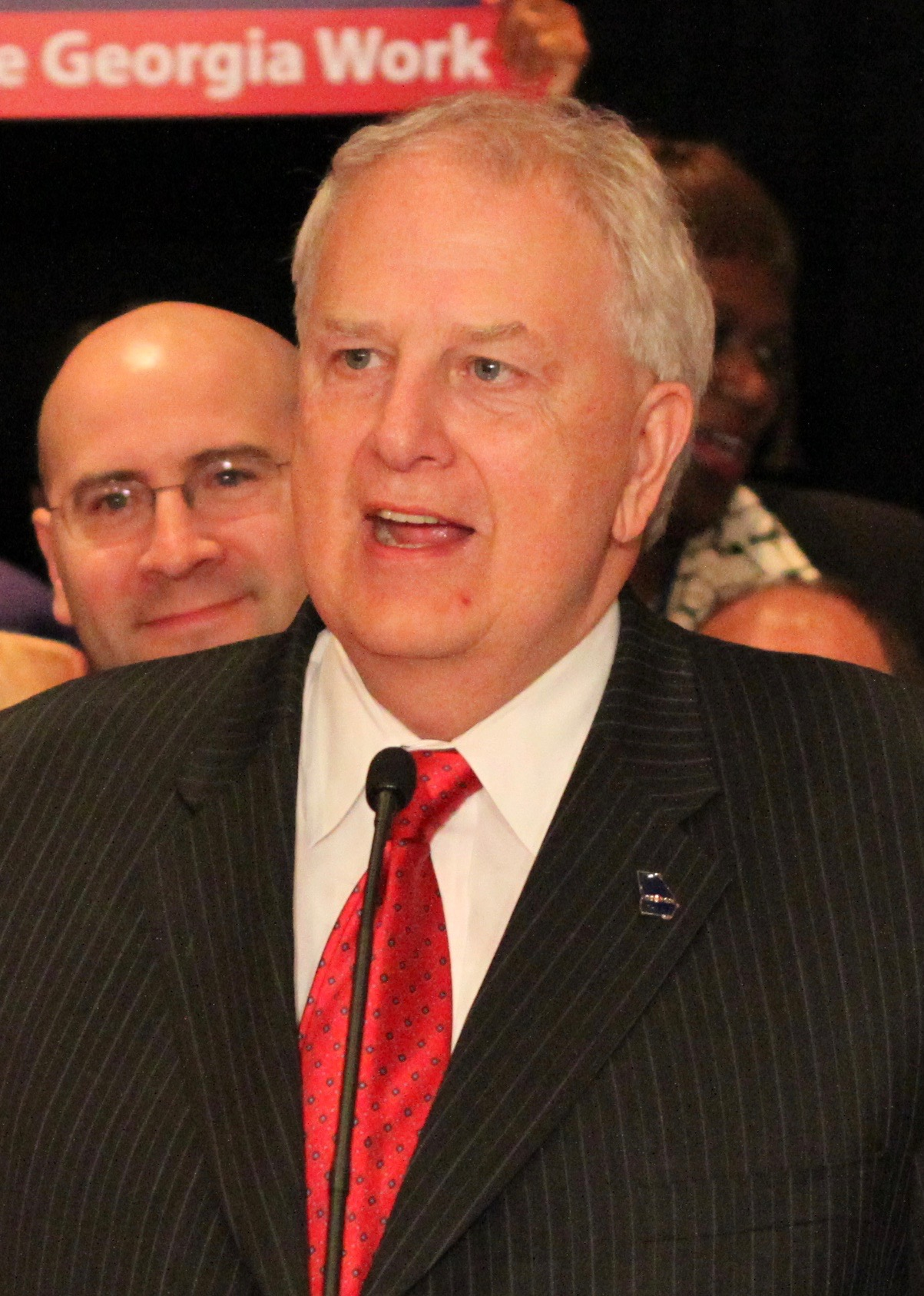
Barnes in 2010

Barnes announced his candidacy for the Democratic nomination for Governor of Georgia in the 2010 election on June 3, 2009 in his hometown of Marietta, Georgia.

Barnes’ campaign, Roy 2010, emphasized growing jobs, securing water sources, improving education, and expanding transportation options. Barnes won the 2010 Democratic Primary on July 20, 2010, and faced off against Republican Nathan Deal and Libertarian John Monds.

On November 2, 2010, Barnes conceded to Deal as the Republican rode a wave of GOP backing in the 2010 midterm elections.

== Electoral history ==
Georgia gubernatorial election, 2010
Party	Candidate	Votes	%	±%
Republican	Nathan Deal	1,365,832	53.02%	−4.93%
Democratic	Roy Barnes	1,107,011	42.97%	+4.75%
Libertarian	John Monds	103,194	4.01%	+0.17%
Write-ins		124	0.00%	
Majority		258,821	10.05%	−9.68%
Turnout		2,576,161		
Republican hold		Swing		

Georgia Gubernatorial Election 2010 – Democratic Primary
Party	Candidate	Votes	%	±%
Democratic	Thurbert Baker	85,146	21.7	
Democratic	Roy E. Barnes	258,401	65.8	
Democratic	Bill Bolton	3,555	0.9	
Democratic	Carl Camon	4,152	1.1	
Democratic	Randall Mangham	3,106	0.8	
Democratic	DuBose Porter	16,499	4.2	
Democratic	David Poythress	21,613	5.5	

Georgia Gubernatorial Election 2002
Party	Candidate	Votes	%	±%
Democratic	Roy E. Barnes (incumbent)	937,062	46.3	
Republican	Sonny Perdue	1,041,677	51.4	
Libertarian	Gary Hayes	47,122	2.3	

Georgia Gubernatorial Election 2002 – Democratic Primary
Party	Candidate	Votes	%	±%
Democratic	Roy E. Barnes (incumbent)	434,892	100.0	

Georgia Gubernatorial Election 1998
Party	Candidate	Votes	%	±%
Democratic	Roy E. Barnes	941,076	52.5	
Republican	Guy Millner	790,201	44.1	
Libertarian	Jack Cashin	61,531	3.4	

Georgia Gubernatorial Election 1998 – Democratic Primary Runoff
Party	Candidate	Votes	%	±%
Democratic	Roy E. Barnes	221,651	82.9	
Democratic	Lewis A. Massey	45,735	17.1	

Georgia Gubernatorial Election 1998 – Democratic Primary
Party	Candidate	Votes	%	±%
Democratic	Roy E. Barnes	239,517	49.2	
Democratic	Morris James	9,148	1.9	
Democratic	Steve Langford	31,543	6.5	
Democratic	Lewis A. Massey	135,920	27.9	
Democratic	Carlton Myers	4,853	1.0	
Democratic	David Poythress	65,860	13.5	

Georgia State Representative District 33 1996
Party	Candidate	Votes	%	±%
Democratic	Roy E. Barnes (incumbent)	8,054	70.2	
Republican	Michael G. Greene	3,423	29.8	

Georgia State Representative District 33 1996 – Democratic Primary
Party	Candidate	Votes	%	±%
Democratic	Roy E. Barnes (incumbent)	1,078	100.0	

== See also ==
Party political offices
Preceded by Zell Miller	Democratic nominee for Governor of Georgia; 1998, 2002	Succeeded by Mark Taylor
Preceded by Mark Taylor	Democratic nominee for Governor of Georgia; 2010	Succeeded by Jason Carter
Political offices
Preceded by Zell Miller	Governor of Georgia; 1999–2003	Succeeded by Sonny Perdue
U.S. order of precedence (ceremonial)
Preceded by Joe Frank Harris as Former Governor	Order of precedence of the United States	Succeeded by Nathan Deal as Former Governor
