= 2004 Georgia Democratic presidential primary =

- March 2, 2004

101 Democratic National Convention delegates (86 pledged, 15 unpledged) The number of pledged delegates received is determined by the popular vote
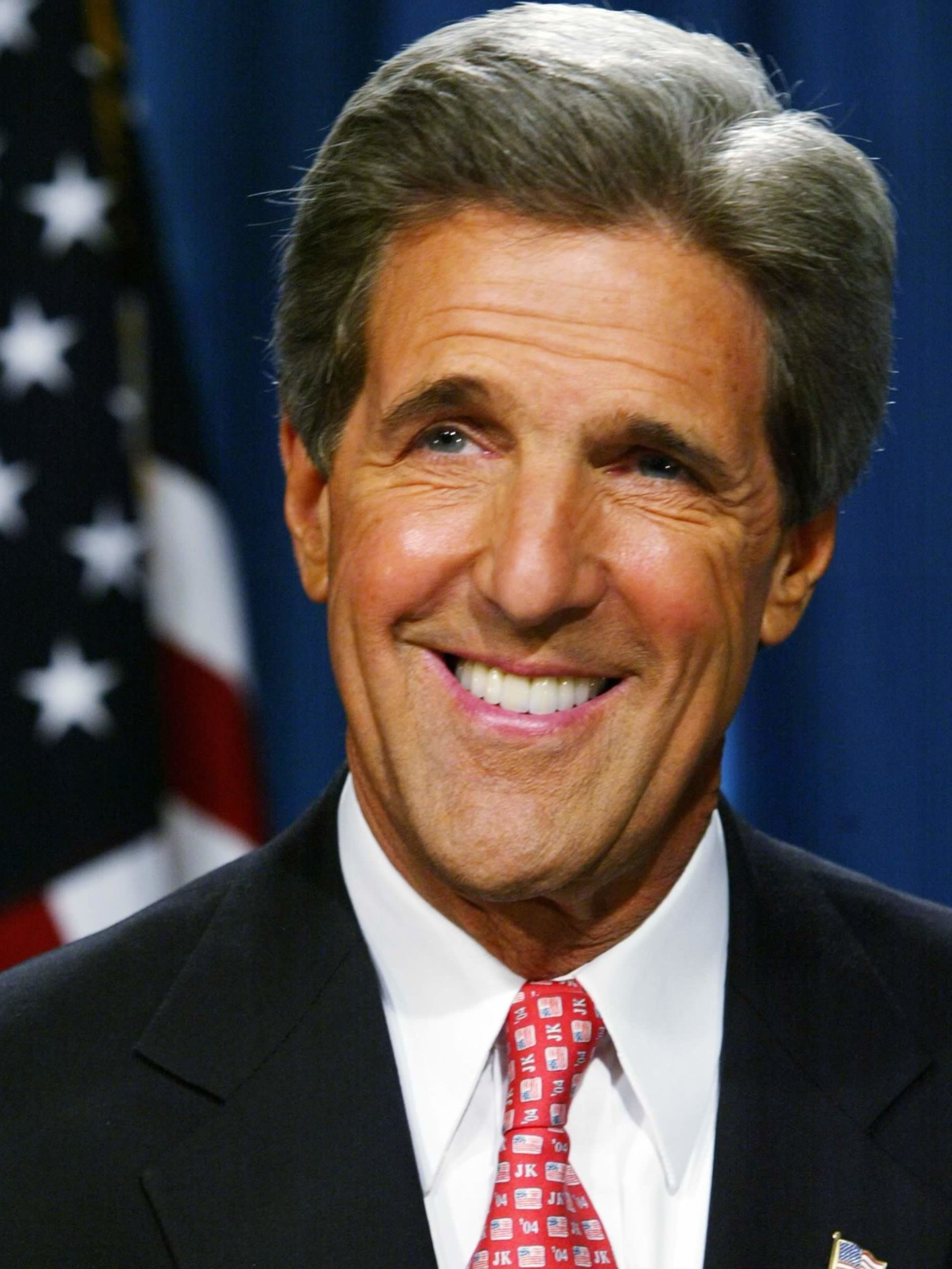

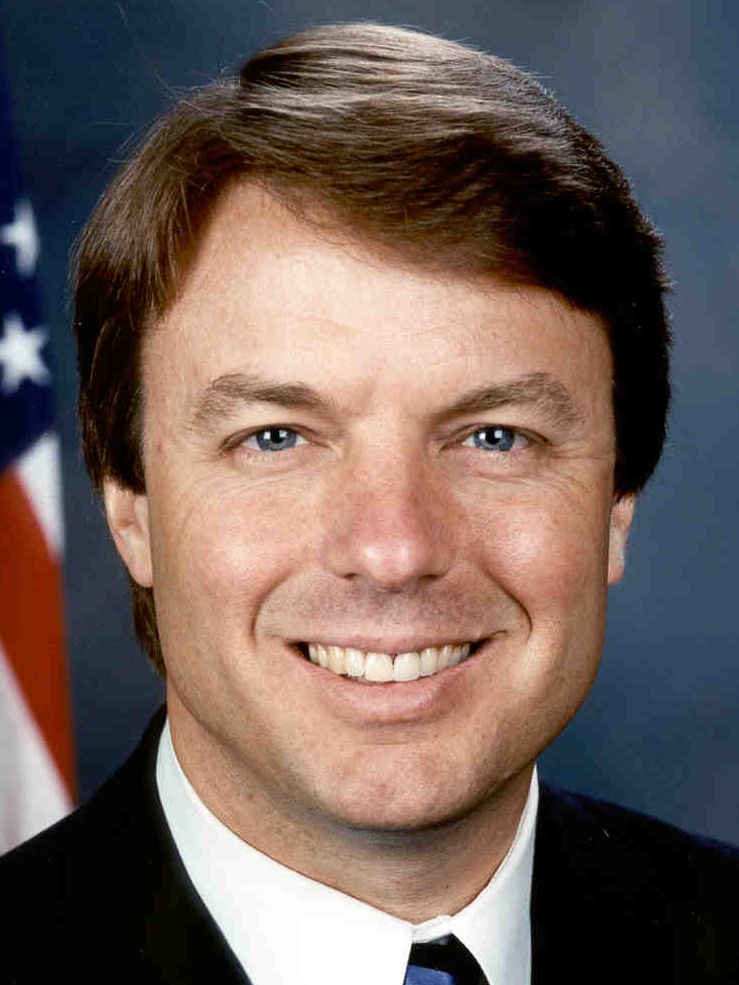

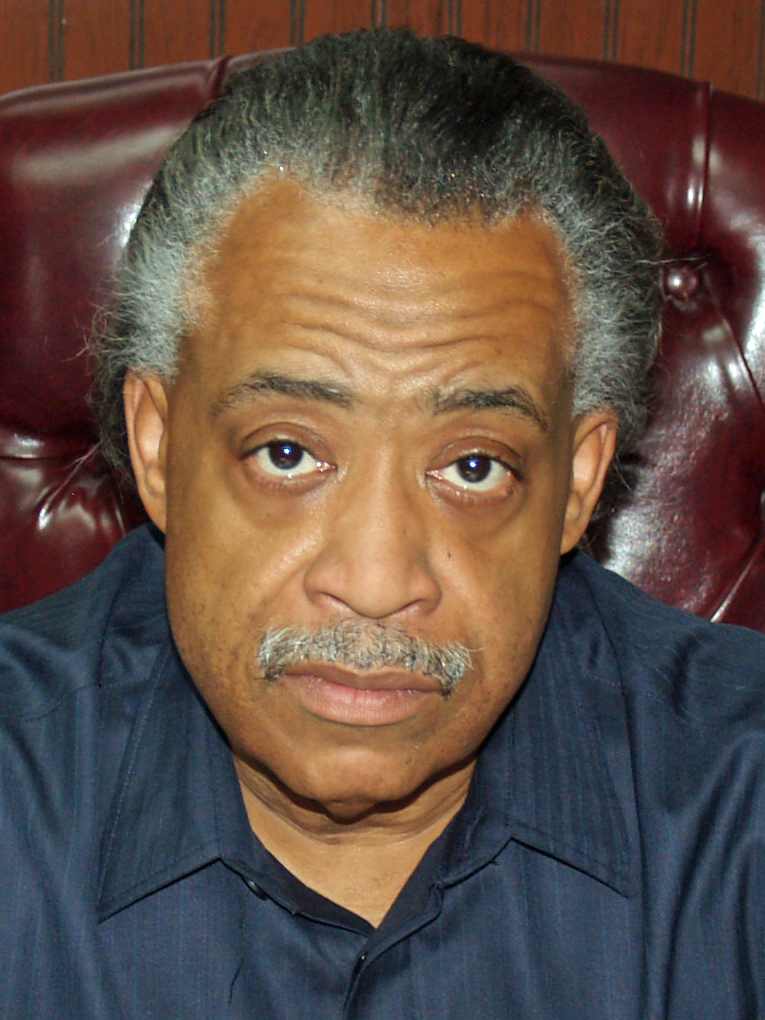
Candidate	John Kerry	John Edwards	Al Sharpton
Home state	Massachusetts	North Carolina	New York
Delegate count	46	41	0
Popular vote	293,225	259,361	39,123
Percentage	46.8%	41.4%	6.2%
- Primary results by county Kerry: 40–50% 50–60% 60–70% Edwards: 40–50% 50–60% 60–70%

The 2004 Georgia Democratic presidential primary was held on March 2 in the U.S. state of Georgia as one of the Democratic Party's statewide nomination contests ahead of the 2004 presidential election.

== Results ==
Georgia Democratic Presidential Primary Results – 2004
Party	Candidate	Votes	Percentage	Delegates
Democratic	John Kerry	293,225	46.8%	46
Democratic	John Edwards	259,361	41.4%	40
Democratic	Al Sharpton	39,123	6.2%	0
Democratic	Howard Dean (withdrawn)	11,320	1.8%	0
Democratic	Dennis Kucinich	7,699	1.2%	0
Democratic	Joe Lieberman (withdrawn)	5,666	0.9%	0
Democratic	Wesley Clark (withdrawn)	4,247	0.7%	0
Democratic	Carol Moseley Braun (withdrawn)	3,747	0.6%	0
Democratic	Dick Gephardt (withdrawn)	2,350	0.4%	0
Totals		626,738	100.00%	86
