= Andre Dickens =

Mayor of Atlanta since 2022

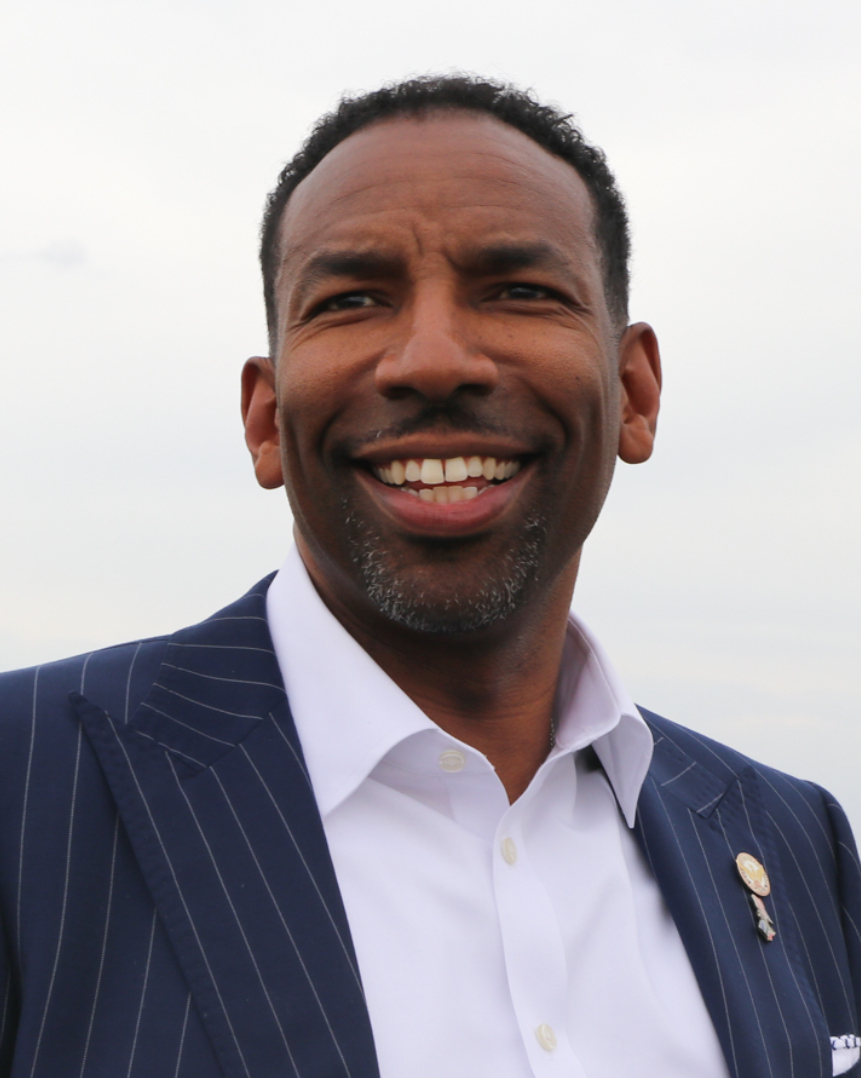
- Dickens in 2024

61st Mayor of Atlanta
- Incumbent
- Assumed office January 3, 2022
- Preceded by: Keisha Lance Bottoms

Member of the Atlanta City Council from the at-large district Post 3
- In office January 6, 2014 – January 3, 2022
- Preceded by: H. Lamar Willis
- Succeeded by: Keisha Waites

Personal details
- Born: Andre Peter Dickens; June 17, 1974 (age 52) Atlanta, Georgia, U.S.
- Party: Democratic
- Education: Georgia Institute of Technology (BS); Georgia State University (MPA)
- Website: Office website Campaign website

Andre Peter Dickens (born June 17, 1974) is an American politician who has served as the 61st mayor of Atlanta, Georgia, since 2022. Previously a member of the Atlanta City Council, he won the 2021 mayoral election after defeating council president Felicia Moore in a runoff. Dickens had also chaired the Public Safety and Legal Administration Committee. He is also the chief development officer of TechBridge, a technology-based nonprofit. Dickens won a second term as mayor in 2025.

== Early life and education ==
Dickens was born in 1974, in Atlanta. He was raised by his mother, Sylvia Dickens, and stepfather, who adopted him and his two siblings at the age of 7. He and his stepfather often bonded over taking things apart and rebuilding them, which birthed Dickens' passion for engineering.

He grew up in Southwest Atlanta, and attended Benjamin Elijah Mays High School, before enrolling at the Georgia Institute of Technology, where he received his degree in chemical engineering in 1998. Dickens received his Master's of Public Administration in Economic Development from Georgia State University.

== Early career ==
While enrolled at Georgia Tech, Dickens began his professional career in 1994 as a part-time chemical engineer for BP-Amoco. Immediately after getting his degree, the position became full-time. In 1999, he was a sales engineer at DSM Engineering and Plastics. He was named the first Black salesman of the year.

At age 28, Dickens and his older sister co-founded City-Living Home Furnishing. The furnishing company was in existence from 2002 to 2011, and became a multi-million dollar business in only two locations. However, due to the housing crisis, Dickens was unable to keep the company alive; in 2010 he filed for Chapter Seven bankruptcy.

In 2013, Dickens was elected as an at-large city council member. From 2014 to 2021, he mainly advocated for the improvement of Atlanta's public safety, the need for affordable housing, having programs for citizens, and creating more opportunities to students in Atlanta's Public School system. One of his most important contributions while on the city council was sponsoring legislation that made the minimum wage for city employees fifteen dollars an hour. In addition to changing the minimum wage he created the Department of Transportation, the BeltLine Inclusionary Zoning which increased affordable housing in the area, and the Atlanta Youth Commission.

== Mayor of Atlanta (2022–present) ==
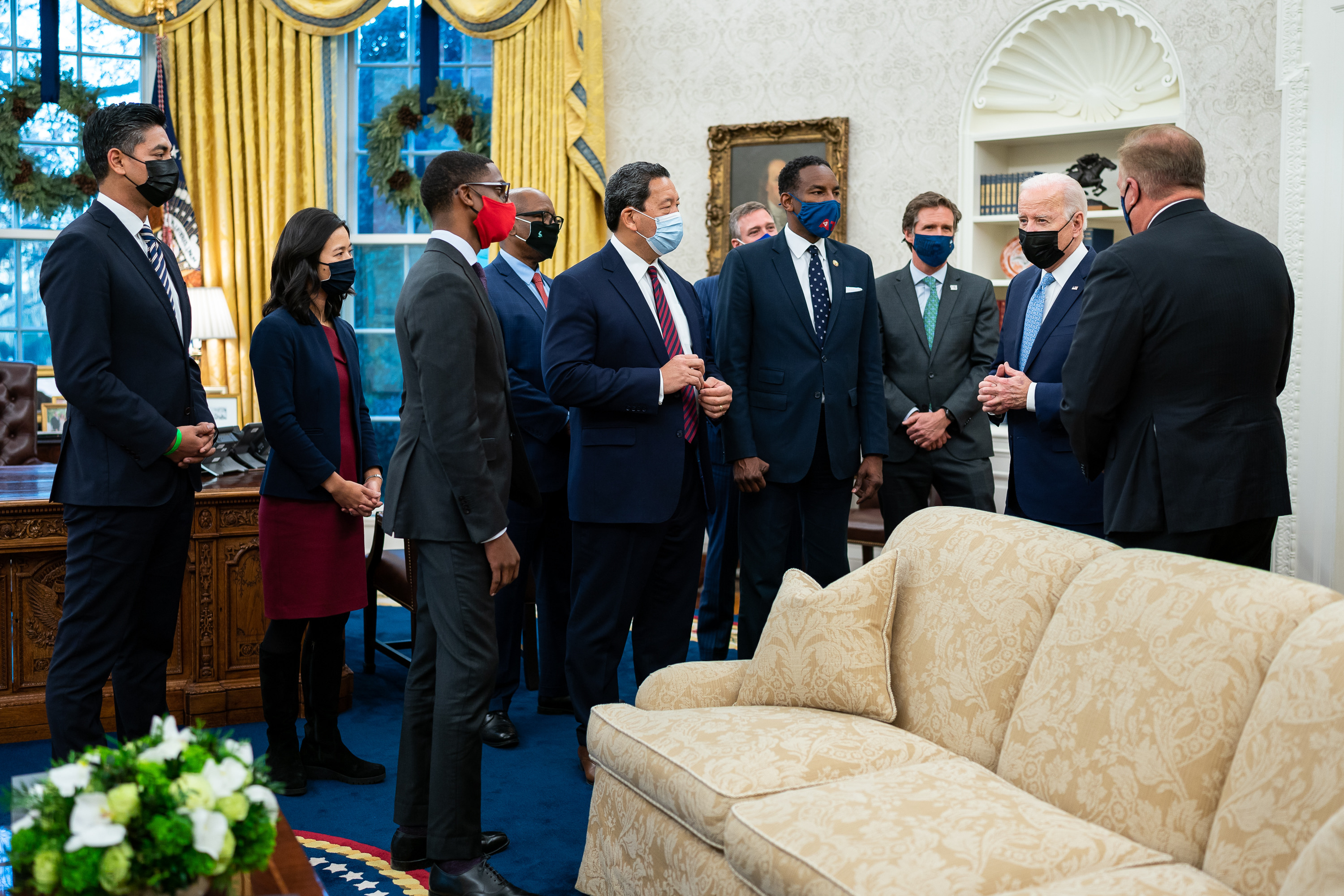
Dickens (fourth from right) and other newly elected mayors meeting with President Joe Biden in December 2021

On February 25, 2022, Dickens lifted the indoor COVID-19 mask mandate in Atlanta, ending a nearly two-year restriction on restaurants, hotels, and other venues.

During his first year in office, Dickens made one of Atlanta's largest-ever single-housing investments, committing more than $100 million to new and updated housing. The Dickens administration continues to partner with and leverage tools such as inclusionary zoning to assist with this investment. In order to offer affordable housing alongside increasing interest rates, new developments in areas with major public interest such as Westside Park and the BeltLine will take precedence.

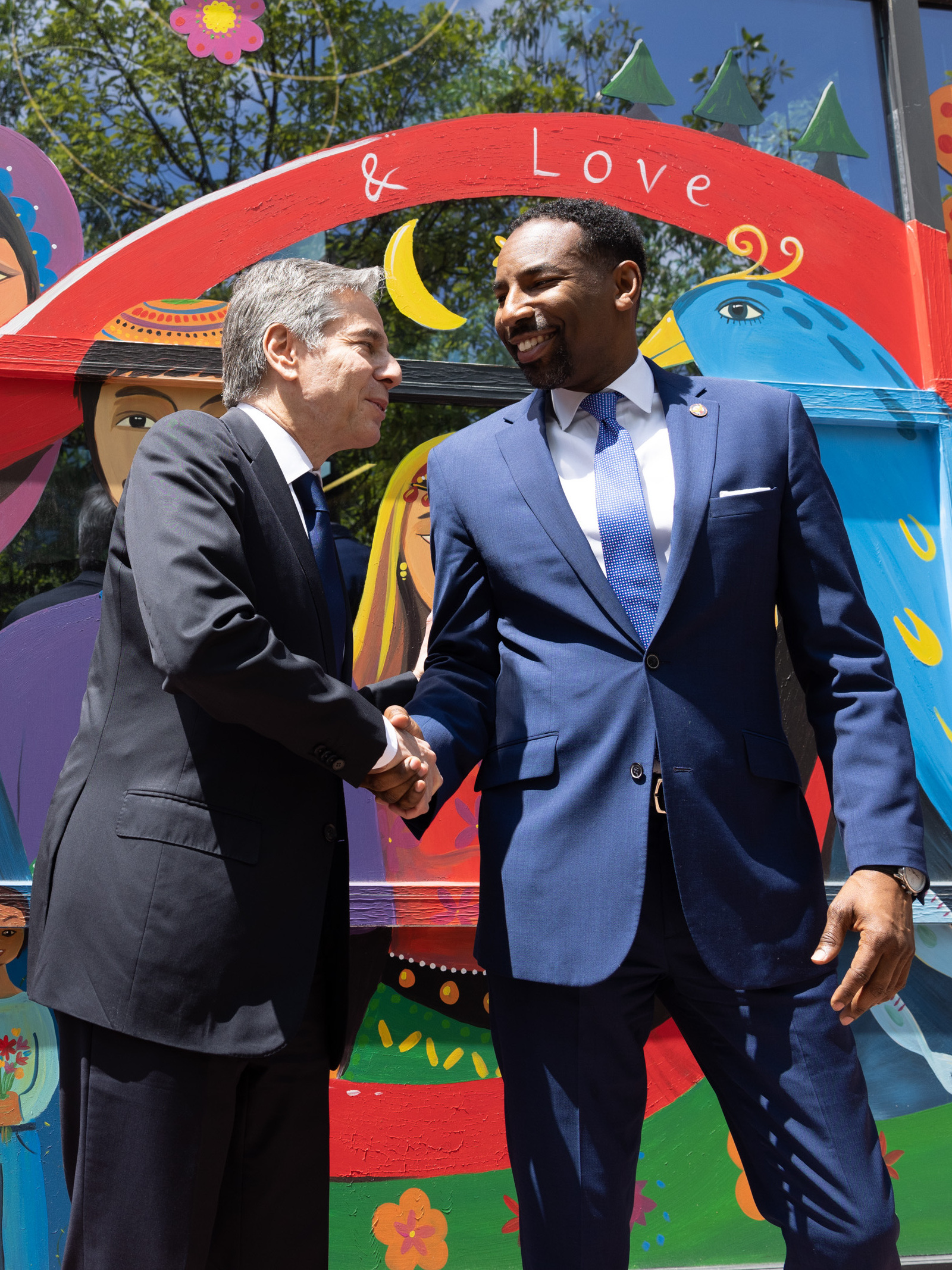
Secretary of State Antony Blinken with Mayor Dickens in May 2023

Dickens' early accomplishments in office include the city's first-ever investment in early childhood education and the creation of a Nightlife Division to combat establishments with a history of violent crime.

During Dickens' term, over $13 million in funding has been set aside to combat homelessness, with the help of the LIFT 2.0 homeless response plan. By the end of 2024, the city hoped to provide 1,500 housing placements for impoverished families by collaborating with local government, corporations, nonprofits, and community members.

In October 2022, Dickens appointed Darin Schierbaum as the 26th chief of the Atlanta Police Department.

Dickens condemned the 2023 Hamas-led attack on Israel, saying that Israel "has the right to defend itself."

== Environmental policy ==
=== Sustainability administration and climate planning ===
In August 2022, Dickens appointed Chandra Farley as Atlanta's chief sustainability officer, a cabinet-level post that had been vacant for almost a year, and named John Seydel as her deputy. Farley took office on September 29, 2022. In February 2023, Dickens and Farley reconvened the Clean Energy Advisory Board, the 25-member citizen panel charged with guiding the Clean Energy Atlanta plan, which the City Council had adopted in 2019 with the goal of running the city entirely on clean energy by 2035. The board had stopped meeting in 2022.

The administration began public engagement on a citywide climate plan in 2025 and released the Climate Resilience Action Plan, branded "Climate Resilient ATL," in February 2026. The plan keeps the 2035 clean-energy goal and sets targets of a 59 percent reduction in greenhouse gas emissions from 2019 levels by 2030 and net-zero emissions by 2050. At an advisory board meeting in August 2026, city officials reported that emissions had fallen 21 percent against an interim target of 25 percent.

=== Atlanta Public Safety Training Center and Intrenchment Creek ===
Dickens has supported the Atlanta Public Safety Training Center, built on about 85 acres of the city-owned former Atlanta Prison Farm in unincorporated DeKalb County. The property is bordered by Intrenchment Creek, a tributary of the South River, and lies within the South River Forest, a city-planned network of roughly 3,000 acres of green space in southeast Atlanta and southwest DeKalb County.

As a councilmember, Dickens voted on September 8, 2021, to approve the ground lease to the Atlanta Police Foundation; the measure passed 10–4 after about 17 hours of public comment. He had backed the facility and its location during a delay in August, when the council amended the lease to provide that the remaining 265 acres be used for reforestation and public access. The vote drew criticism from some progressive voters during his 2021 runoff campaign.

On January 31, 2023, less than two weeks after six Georgia State Patrol troopers shot and killed 26-year-old environment protester Manuel Esteban Paez Terán during a raid on the Stop Cop City protest encampment in the forest in Intrenchment Creek Park, Dickens and DeKalb County CEO Michael Thurmond announced a memorandum of understanding that attached environmental and community conditions to the project. The agreement, announced alongside DeKalb's land-disturbance permit, adopted the recommendations of a community stakeholder advisory committee and committed the city to "double erosion control" to protect Intrenchment Creek, the planting of 100 hardwood trees for every specimen tree removed, and coordinated planning for the surrounding South River Forest with the Atlanta Regional Commission. Pledges on sustainable materials and local hiring were qualified by the phrase "whenever possible and feasible," and the Atlanta Police Foundation, the project's developer, was not a party to the document. Dickens said the site had been cleared decades earlier and that the facility "will not be built over a forest," and he described the surrounding land as "a huge park about the size of Atlanta's largest park."

SaportaReport found that several of the agreement's claims about the property were inaccurate or misleading, including its size: Dickens and city documents described the prison farm as 380 to 385 acres, while DeKalb County property records and the permit applications put it at about 296 acres. The permit application counted 4,201 trees on the site, 197 of them classified as significant and 68 as specimen trees, and proposed saving 115 of the significant trees and planting 494 new ones. DeKalb County Commissioner Ted Terry, an opponent of the project, dismissed the sustainable-materials pledge as greenwashing.

Before the permit was issued, the South River Watershed Alliance asked the Georgia Environmental Protection Division for a higher-level review of the site's stormwater plan, arguing that Intrenchment Creek already exceeded its regulatory limit for sediment. On April 6, 2023, county inspectors found that silt fencing and other erosion controls at the site were failing and issued a stop-work order, which was lifted the next day after a reinspection. The DeKalb County Zoning Board of Appeals unanimously rejected a resident's appeal of the land-disturbance permit on April 12, 2023.

In August 2023, the alliance sued the city and the Atlanta Police Foundation in the United States District Court for the Northern District of Georgia, alleging that stormwater discharges from the construction site violated the Clean Water Act and would carry sediment into Intrenchment Creek. The court denied a preliminary injunction in January 2024 and the defendants' motion to dismiss in August 2024, and the parties reported a settlement that October. Judge J. P. Boulee approved the settlement and dismissed the case in April 2025.

The training center opened on April 29, 2025, at a ceremony attended by Governor Brian Kemp; the facility cost about $118 million. Dickens said the city would add trails and a safety ambassador program and prepare a master plan for the remaining land, which he put at about 300 acres, with ideas including playgrounds and recognition of the site's history as a prison farm. In February 2026, the city's Department of Parks and Recreation began planning a "Restoration Memorial and Preserve" on more than 100 acres of the property, including frontage on Intrenchment Creek, with a design team led by HGOR. The land remained closed to the public during the planning process.

The adjoining Intrenchment Creek Park belongs to DeKalb County, which in January 2021, a year before Dickens took office, traded 40 acres of it to developer Ryan Millsap's Blackhall Real Estate for land elsewhere. County officials closed the park in March 2023, citing dangerous conditions in the forest, and reopened it, now called Michelle Obama Park, in September 2026.

=== Trees and greenspace ===
Atlanta's first major rewrite of its tree-protection ordinance since 2001 passed the City Council unanimously in June 2025 with the Dickens administration's support. The ordinance raised the recompense fee for removing trees to $140 per diameter inch, effective January 1, 2026, doubled the maximum fine for illegal clearing to $200,000 per acre, and required tree-service companies to register with the city. Tree advocates objected that preservation standards included in earlier drafts had been removed, and a council committee had advanced the narrower version on a 4–1 vote. Dickens welcomed the ordinance and called Atlanta a "city in the forest."

In 2022, the city acquired about 75 acres of the former Chattahoochee Brick Company site, a brickworks on the Chattahoochee River that had operated with leased convict labor, after The Conservation Fund bought the property with a grant from the Kendeda Fund. Dickens marked the transfer at a ceremony on September 24, 2022, and the city plans a memorial and park on the site.

=== Water and stormwater ===
In August 2022, the City Council approved $5.3 million in settlements with three Peoplestown property owners whose homes the city had sought to take by eminent domain for a stormwater-retention project begun under Dickens's predecessors. The settlements ended litigation that had run for most of a decade; the family of Mattie Jackson, the last holdout, credited Dickens with resolving the dispute.

Beginning on May 31, 2024, breaks in two aging water mains disrupted service in parts of the city, including Downtown and Midtown, for several days. Dickens declared a state of emergency, brought in the United States Army Corps of Engineers, and apologized for the city's communication during the outage. He later announced sensor-based leak detection on the city's water valves, a $5 million relief fund for affected businesses, and a review panel that included former mayor Shirley Franklin.

=== Atlanta Public Safety Training Center ===
Dickens has supported the city's funding the construction of a controversial police and fire department training center, dubbed "Cop City" by environmentalists and community activists.

More than 1,300 climate, justice, and community groups called for Dickens' resignation due to his perceived support for law enforcement following the police killing of anti-"Cop City" activist Manuel "Tortuguita" Terán on January 18, 2023. The groups expressed strong disapproval of Dickens' refusal to condemn the killing, and criticized his alignment with law enforcement, particularly in the context of Georgia Republican Governor Brian Kemp deploying the National Guard to quell protests, escalating tensions and threats against demonstrators. Dickens said that the protests were not peaceful, and non-Georgia residents were arrested on domestic terrorism for traveling into the state with explosives as a means to protest the construction site of "Cop City."

In September 2023, Dickens expressed a commitment to prioritize residents' voices in the citywide vote on the $90 million police training facility. However, his administration faced criticism for not moving forward with the signature verification process, prompting concerns raised by Sen. Raphael Warnock, D-Ga., particularly regarding the practice's past criticism by Georgia Democrats. As of September 2023, activists had turned in more than 116,000 signatures in an effort to get a referendum on the ballot regarding the future of the planned training facility.

=== Taxpayer funds ===
In 2022, the Office of Inspector General (OIG) determined that nearly $121,000 used for Dickens' Senior Citizen Ball celebrating Atlanta's residents 65 and older, did not follow procurement guidelines, ultimately using taxpayers' dollars to fund the party. The OIG referred its findings to the City of Atlanta Ethics Office for review of potential violations of the city's Ethics Code. The Office of Mayor Dickens responded to the OIG report by saying they were committed to compliance with rules and regulations, and would follow proper procedures for the 2023 Senior Ball. Dickens said he intended to reimburse the city for hotel room costs for himself and his family.

=== Affordable housing ===
Regarding Atlanta's housing policy, critics have raised concerns about the initial plans for the Civic Center, calling them "far too little deeply affordable housing." This refers to homes priced for households earning less than half of the area's median income. Housing advocates have expressed the need for additional anti-discrimination safeguards in the new resolution, particularly regarding renters using Section 8 vouchers, to prevent landlords from refusing to rent to them. In response to these issues, Dickens faced criticism for advocating a change in the law that would require the Georgia Legislature to revise statewide laws. These laws currently prohibit local governments from enacting fair housing laws that are more expansive than the state's regulations.

In May 2022, Dickens faced criticism from housing advocates when his initial budget proposal omitted a contribution to the Building the Beloved Community Affordable Housing Trust Fund. Responding to the backlash, he later announced a $7 million addition to the proposed budget, increasing the total affordable housing investment from $58.7 million to about $65 million.

== Personal life ==
Dickens lives in the Historic Collier Heights neighborhood in northwest Atlanta. He has a daughter.

He is a Brother of Kappa Alpha Psi, having pledged when he attended Georgia Tech.

== Electoral history ==
2021 Atlanta mayoral election
Party	Candidate	Votes	%
Nonpartisan	Felicia Moore	39,202	40.8
Nonpartisan	Andre Dickens	22,153	23.0
Nonpartisan	Kasim Reed	21,541	22.4
Nonpartisan	Sharon Gay	6,578	6.8
Nonpartisan	Antonio Brown	4,544	4.7
Nonpartisan	Kenneth Hill	538	0.6
Nonpartisan	Rebecca King	372	0.4
Nonpartisan	Mark Hammad	343	0.4
Nonpartisan	Kirsten Dunn	267	0.3
Nonpartisan	Walter Reeves	162	0.2
Nonpartisan	Glenn Wrightson	150	0.2
Nonpartisan	Richard Wright	138	0.1
Nonpartisan	Nolan English	98	0.1
Nonpartisan	Roosevelt Searles III	72	0.1
Total votes		96,158	100.00

A member of the Democratic party, Dickens first served for the Atlanta city council in 2013. In 2017, as an incumbent, he ran unopposed in the general election for the at-large Post 3 seat for city council. After two terms on city council, he ran for mayor of Atlanta. Throughout his campaign he captured numerous endorsements, ranging from state senators to local leaders in the community. Dickens captured 23% of the vote in the general election, edging out Kasim Reed for the second spot in the runoff race. Although Dickens did not win the 2021 Atlanta mayoral primary election (coming in second place), he won the following runoff election by a wide margin.

2021 Atlanta mayoral election runoff
Party	Candidate	Votes	%
Nonpartisan	Andre Dickens	50,071	63.7
Nonpartisan	Felicia Moore	28,572	36.3
Total votes		78,643	100.00

Political offices
Preceded by Keisha Lance Bottoms	Mayor of Atlanta; 2022–present	Incumbent
