= Stop Cop City =

American social movement

- Part of Black Lives Matter and United States racial unrest (2020–2023) and the climate movement
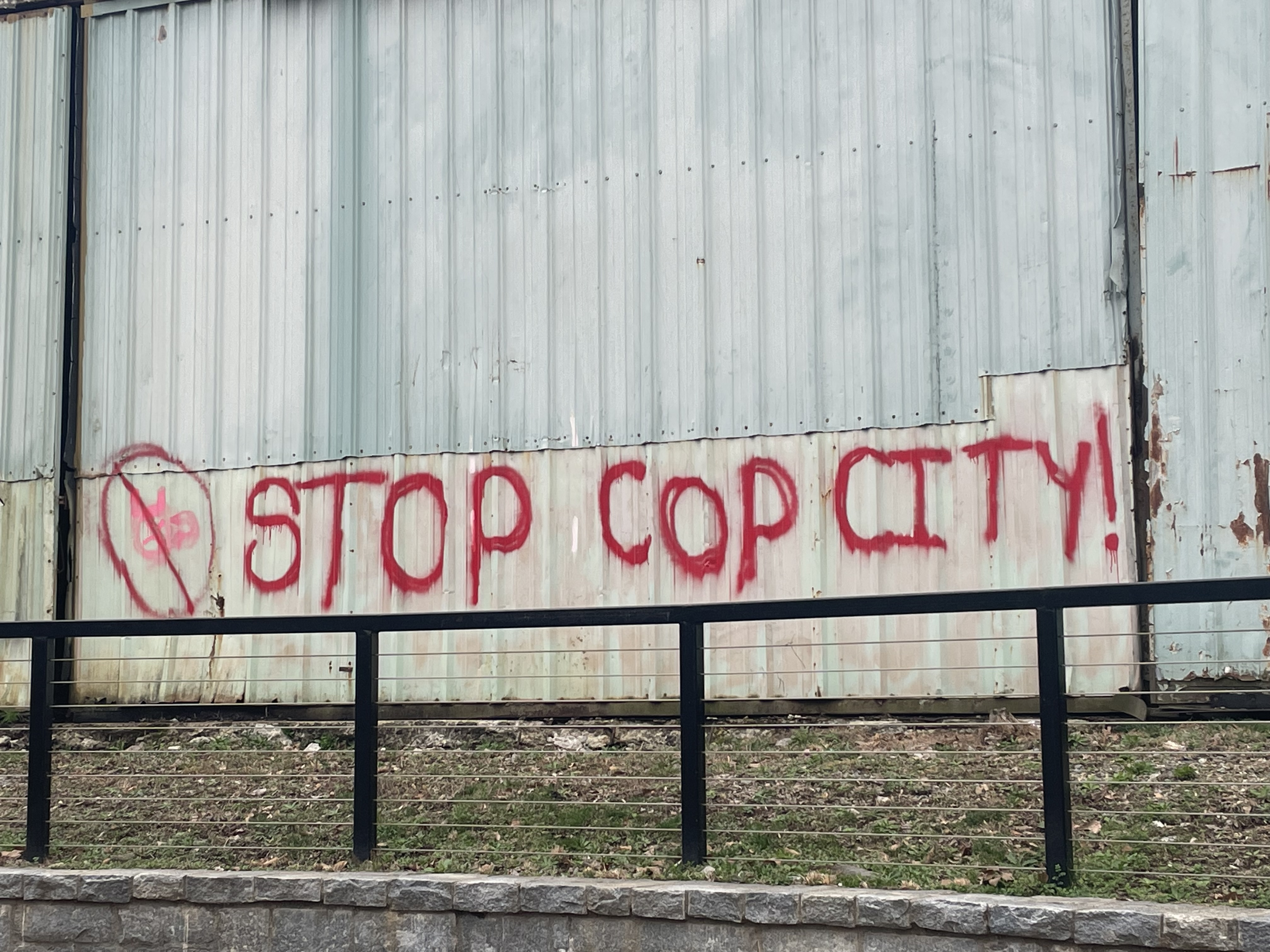
- Stop Cop City graffiti along the Proctor Creek Greenway Trail
- Location: Cop City, South River Forest, DeKalb County, Georgia; 33°41′38″N 84°20′10″W

Parties
Government: Georgia State Patrol; Georgia Bureau of Investigation; Atlanta Police Department; Atlanta Police Foundation; Brasfield & Gorrie	Coalition of environmental organizations, social justice organizations, community groups, and autonomous forest defenders

Lead figures
Brian Kemp; Andre Dickens	non-centralized leadership

Casualties and losses
1 Georgia State Trooper injured (Gunshot)	1 killed (Manuel Esteban Paez Terán)

Stop Cop City (SCC), also known as Defend the Atlanta Forest (DTF), was a decentralized movement focused on Atlanta, Georgia, in opposition to the Atlanta Public Safety Training Center or "Cop City". The facility was announced in 2021 as a partnership between the Atlanta Police Foundation and the City of Atlanta, and completed in April 2025. The Stop Cop City movement has received international attention, especially after Tortuguita, a protestor occupying the site, after firing 4 shots and striking a police member, was killed by police during a raid in January 2023.

Opponents of the facility are concerned about destruction of the South River Forest and associated environmental justice impacts exacerbating economic disparities and ecological response to climate change in a poor, majority-Black neighborhood. Opponents also argue that the center will increase militarization of policing in the city—which had witnessed several protests against police violence following the 2020 murder of George Floyd in Minnesota and the killing of Rayshard Brooks in Atlanta.

Proponents of the training facility said that the project was necessary to fight crime and to improve police morale. They said there was no feasible alternate site for the training center and argued that the location is "not a forest".

The state charged several protestors with domestic terrorism and indicted sixty-one people for criminal conspiracy in September 2023. The protests have drawn participants from all over the United States, and many of those indicted are not from Georgia—leading the project's proponents to cast them as "outside agitators", while movement participants argue that the project will train many police officers from outside of Georgia. A petition for public referendum on the project also became embroiled in a lawsuit, and neither this nor the criminal suits had been resolved by April 2025 when the facility opened.

== Background ==
Following Black Lives Matter protests in the US in 2014, funding for police training at all levels of government skyrocketed, and some cities proposed additional police training facilities. A similar facility was approved in New York City in 2015 following the police killing of Eric Garner, and also in Chicago following a string of police killings in that city between 2014 and 2016.

In 2020, as part of the nationwide response to the murder of George Floyd, Atlanta witnessed a months-long series of protests against police brutality. Less than three weeks after Minneapolis police officer Derek Chauvin murdered Floyd on a public street, an Atlanta police (APD) officer shot and killed Atlanta resident Rayshard Brooks, which resulted in protests, arson, and calls to defund the police.

Criticism of police and associated unrest reduced police morale. Authorities claim that Atlanta had struggled with rising crime, citing 149 homicides in 2021: the most in a single year since the 1990s. However, the city's crime compilation data showed a drop in overall crime rates and an inconclusive trend in homicides from 2009 to 2023. Advocates for the training facility said the facility would help address these problems.

The training center includes a shooting range and a mock village that led to the project being nicknamed "Cop City." The city was expected to pay one-third of the $90 million cost, with the Atlanta Police Foundation (APF) paying the rest. The eventual cost of the project was $118 million, with taxpayers contributing $67 million. The APF first proposed the 85-acre (34 ha) facility in 2017. According to the APF, the project provides "the necessary facilities required to effectively train 21st-century law enforcement agencies responsible for public safety in a major urban city." Atlanta mayor Keisha Lance Bottoms announced the facility in her 2021 State of the City address.

Residents who support the construction of the training facility have said that they want a properly trained police force and hope the project would improve the quality of the Atlanta police force to make their communities safer.

=== Prison farm ===
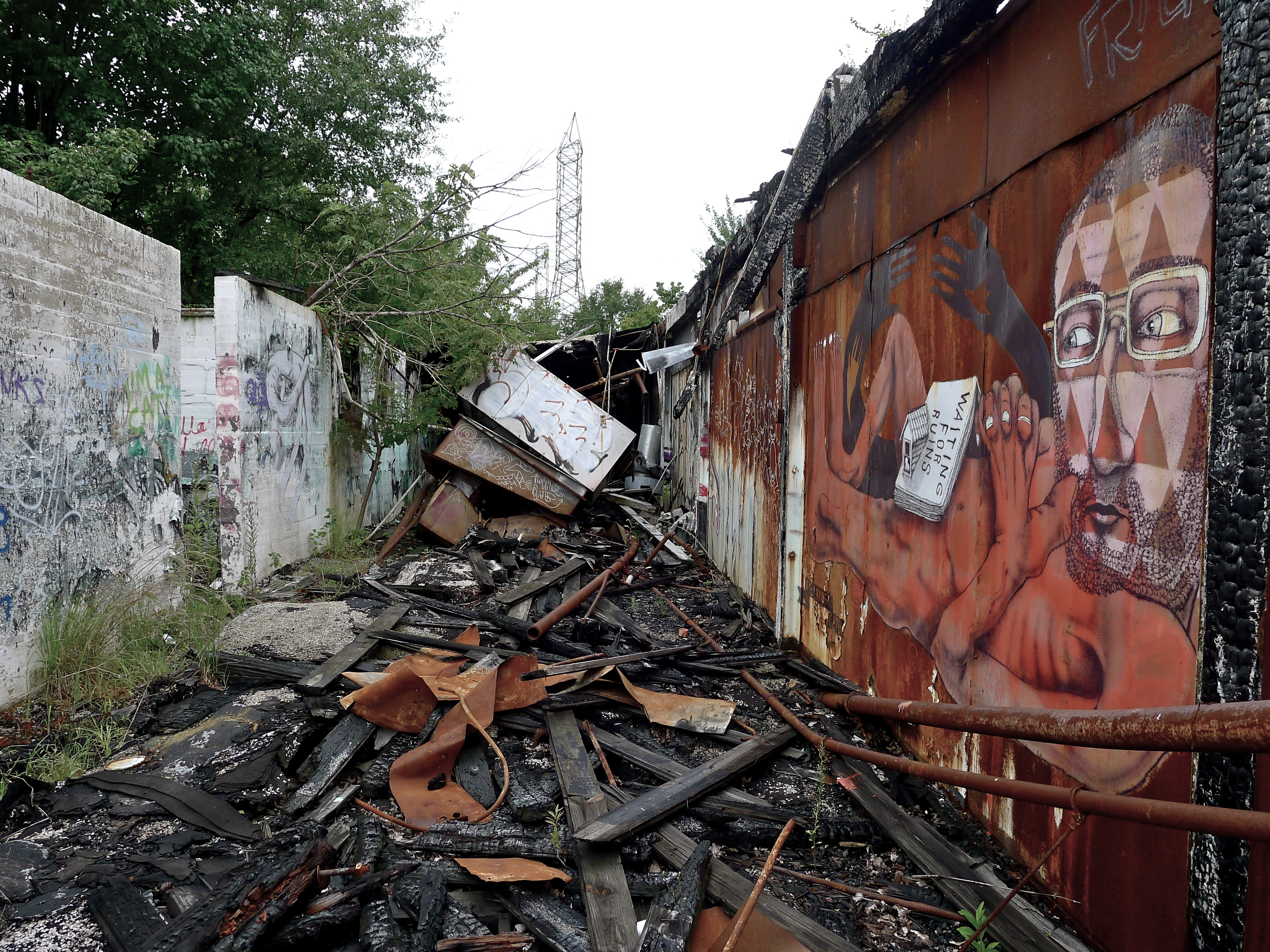
Debris and abandoned buildings at South River Forest

The facility is located at the Old Atlanta Prison Farm (OPF), which in 1999 the Department of City Planning recommended be preserved and placed on the National Register of Historic Places. The majority of prisoners had been arrested for "public inebriation" and related crimes. Prisoners frequently went on strike to demand better food, sanitation, and medical care, and to protest the prison's habit of releasing prisoners downtown late at night with nowhere to go. Beginning in the 1970s, the prison's agricultural operations were "scaled back down to dairy and livestock—250 cows, 300 hogs, 145 prisoners—and abandoned field by field." It was closed officially in the 1990s.

In the two decades before the Cop City controversy, the grassroots organization Save the Old Atlanta Prison Farm advocated for converting the abandoned prison farm into a public park. Members built trails and led historical walking tours for neighbors as part of their advocacy, laying the foundation for the movement to Defend the Atlanta Forest.

Opponents of Cop City have objected to placing the police facility on the site of alleged human rights violations. Environmental justice advocates and organizations have proposed that the OPF should remain a centerpiece in the 3,500-acre (14 km^{2}) urban green space called the South River Forest, citing "massive disparities" in Atlanta's access to green space: African-American residents—including the area surrounding the OPF—have fewer and smaller parks.

== Timeline ==
Cop City has been opposed by a varied coalition that includes residents and neighborhood associations as well as groups organized around racial, housing, food, and environmental justice. Plans were approved by the city in September 2021 after 17 hours of public comment from over 1,100 persons from Atlanta and elsewhere, 70% of whom opposed the project. Some expressed concern that the approval process was secretive with limited input from affected communities. The city appointed a community-advisory committee, and in 2022 Atlanta mayor Andre Dickens said that there was "a lot of room for input." The advisory committee did not include representatives from environmental groups, but does include representatives from the police and fire departments and the Dickens administration.

DTF supporters led divestment movements against corporate sponsors of the APF, and four "week of action" campaigns in 2021–22 that featured live music, supply drives, skill shares, and history lessons about the area.

A portion of the South River Forest adjacent to the APF training center has also been threatened with development by Blackhall Studios—part of the Atlanta film industry. Two environmental organizations, the South River Forest Coalition and the South River Watershed Alliance, filed a lawsuit against the film studio development.

=== Forest defense actions ===
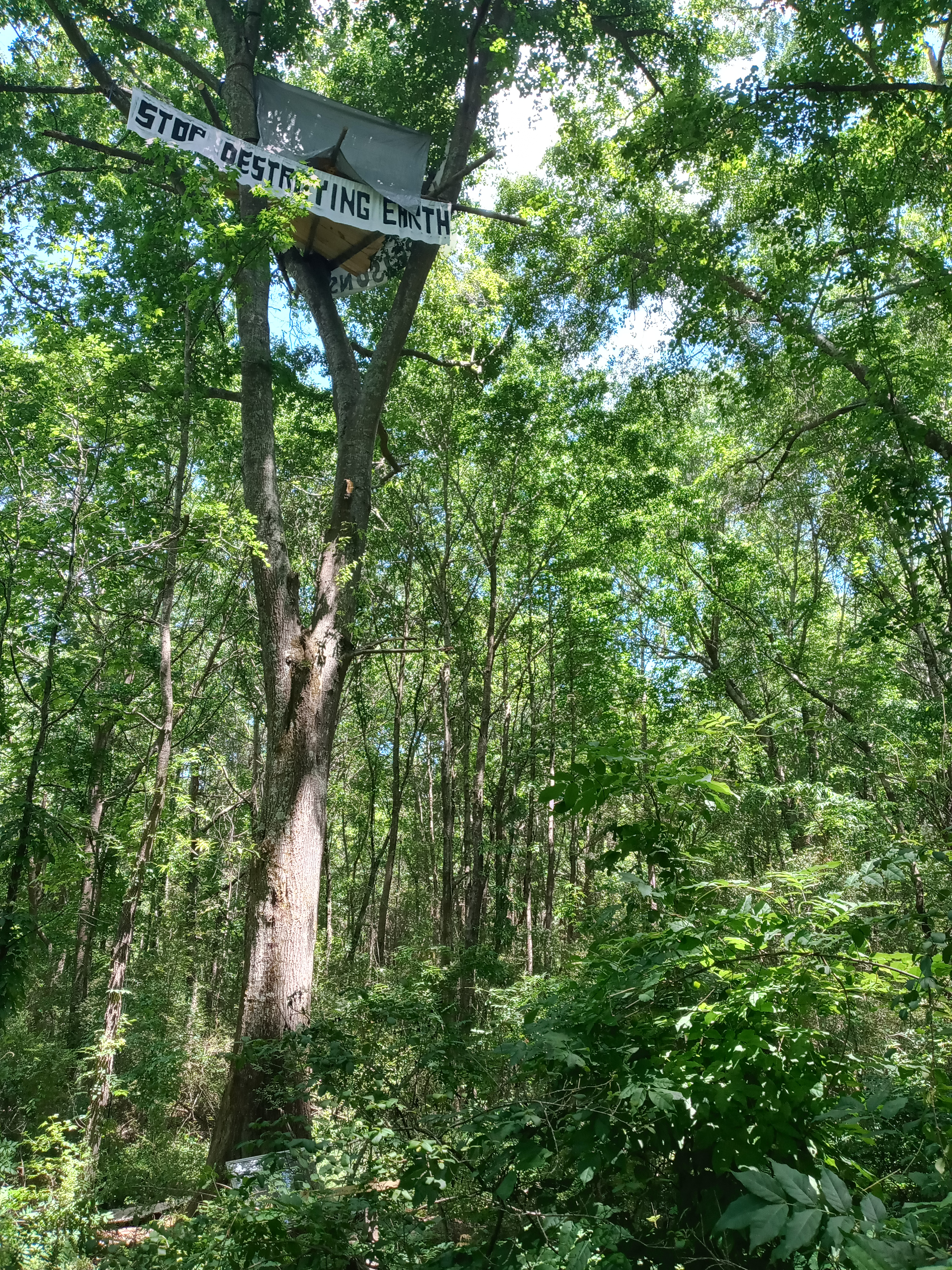
A tree sit to prevent cutting of trees at the Old Atlanta Prison Farm

Beginning in late 2021, the contested forest was occupied by self-described forest defenders who barricaded the area and constructed tree-sits to prevent trees from being cut. Forest defenders had several conflicts with police, resulting in some arrests. They have also destroyed equipment being used by developers in the forest, vandalized property belonging to corporations connected with the APF and Blackhall studios, and committed arson. In May 2022 the corporate offices of Brasfield & Gorrie in Birmingham, Alabama were vandalized, and the message "Drop Cop City Or Else" was spray-painted on the building.

There is wide variation in the political stance and approach of DTF forest defenders, and several sources describe the movement as leaderless and autonomous, with any participant able to act as they wish. Prison abolition was a strongly represented political philosophy among those camped in the forest.

In September 2022, the APF reported that it projected opening the first phase of the facility in late 2023. DTF estimated that it had delayed the project by at least a month and a half. (The project eventually opened in 2025).

On December 13, 2022, a task force of multiple police agencies conducted a joint raid at the training facility site. Five people, none of whom were Atlanta residents, were arrested and charged with domestic terrorism. The Georgia Bureau of Investigation (GBI) stated that road flares, gasoline, and explosive devices were found in the area; when reporters asked police whether the explosive devices were fireworks or something more dangerous, the police declined to answer.

=== Fatal shooting by police ===
On January 18, 2023, Georgia State Troopers and other agencies launched another raid. During the raid a trooper was shot in the leg, and a Venezuelan protester, Manuel Esteban Paez Terán, aka "Tortuguita", was shot and killed by police. Police stated that Tortuguita fired on them after they fired pepper balls into Tortugita's tent. Multiple groups, including other protestors, two independent journalists who had previously interviewed Tortuguita, and Tortuguita's family, have questioned whether they fired first or fired at all, pointing to the lack of body camera footage of the shooting and calling for an independent investigation. GBI conducted a forensic ballistic analysis that matched the projectile recovered from the officer's wound to the handgun found in Tortuguita's possession. The GBI said that there is no body camera footage of the shooting because Georgia State Patrol officers do not wear body-cameras.

Documents released in 2025 appeared to confirm that Paez Terán shot at police, but also indicated that police may have precipitated a violent confrontation by casting forest defenders as domestic terrorists when previous conflicts had only involved fireworks and slingshots, and by escalating the encounter with pepperballs only three minutes after contacting Paez Terán.

In March, Terán's family released the results of an independent autopsy revealing that Terán was shot fourteen times while sitting cross-legged on the ground with their hands raised in the air.

==== Public response ====
The killing of Tortuguita brought national and international attention to the project and its opposition, strengthened existing anti-police sentiment in the US, and significantly escalated the conflict. A vigil for Tortuguita a few days after the shooting erupted in riots, and Governor Kemp called the National Guard to subdue the protests.

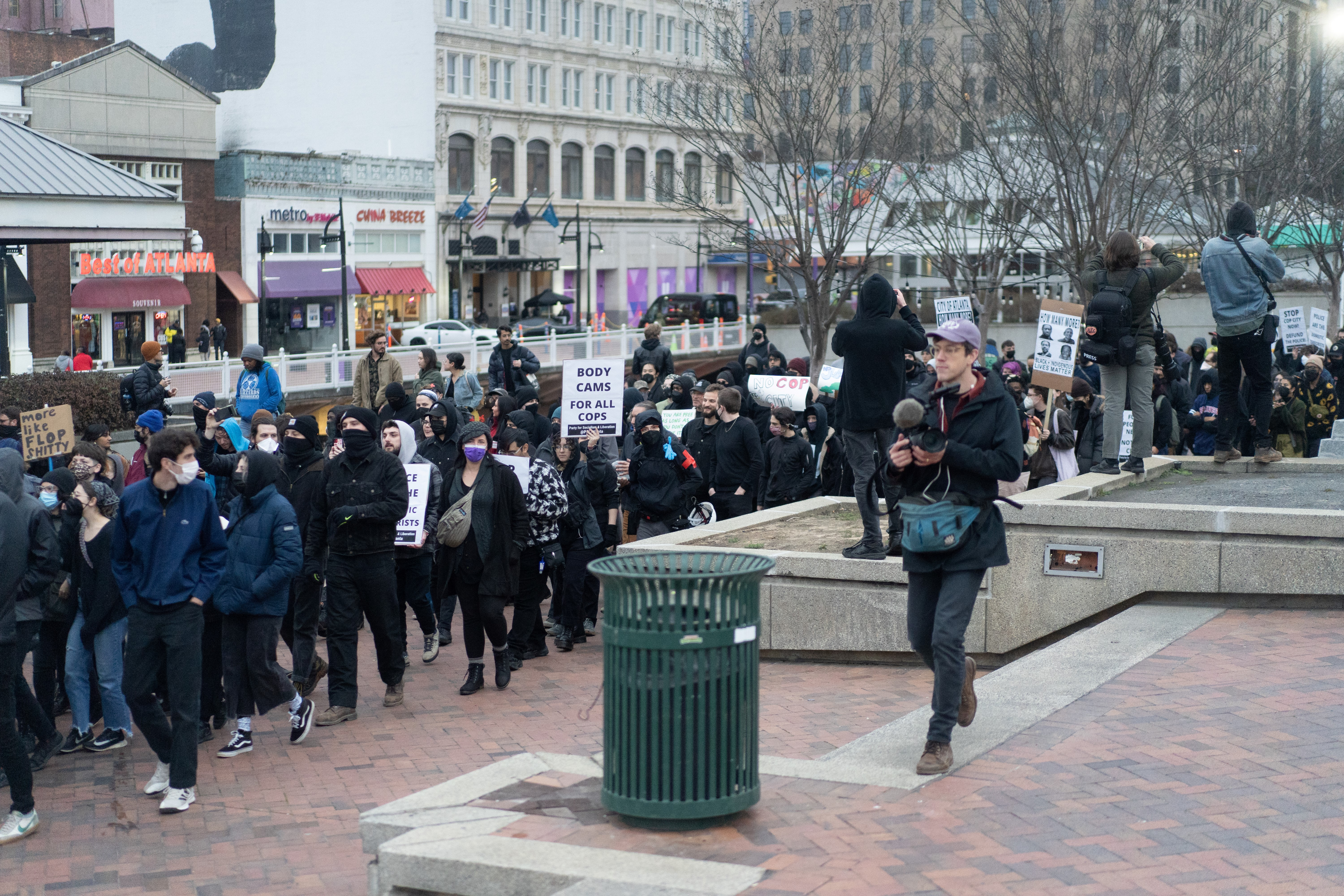
Stop Cop City protests in Atlanta on January 22, 2023

On January 21, 2023, protesters marched from Underground Atlanta down Peachtree Street. At the intersection with Ellis St, some protesters damaged institutions who support the facility and burned an Atlanta Police Department vehicle. Six arrests were made. Responding to condemnation of these acts, Stop Cop City issued a statement asserting that "Destruction of material is fundamentally different from violence. All reported acts appear to be explicitly targeted against the financial backers".

Vigils and protests were also held in other cities, such as Bridgeport, Minneapolis, Nashville, Philadelphia, and Tucson, from January 20 to 22, 2023. Some demonstrators spray painted graffiti on Bank of America buildings to protest the company's involvement in financing the facility's construction.

=== March 2023 attack and domestic terrorism arrests ===
On March 5, 2023, dozens of people attacked the Cop City construction site with rocks and firebombs, destroying construction equipment. Hours later, police raided the South River Music Festival about 0.75 miles away and detained 35 people, of which 12 were released and the remaining 23 were charged with domestic terrorism. Festival attendees have accused police of selectively charging protestors from out of state, while releasing Georgia residents, in order to further the narrative that "outside agitators" coordinated and controlled the protests.

The arrest warrant for the festival attendees stated that domestic terrorism charges were brought against those based on probable cause, such as having had mud on their feet, and that those with legal aid phone numbers written on their bodies were considered suspicious. According to The Intercept, there is no information contained in the warrants that directly connects any of the defendants to illegal actions. Atlanta police chief Darin Schierbaum refused to comment when confronted by journalists about this allegation.

=== May 2023 additional arrests ===
In May 2023, three activists were arrested and charged with felony intimidation of a police officer and misdemeanor stalking, with penalties up to 20 years in prison, for posting fliers and identifying an officer that shot Tortuguita.

That same month, the GBI and APD conducted a SWAT style raid on the Atlanta Solidarity Fund (ASF), a legal bail fund. Three of the fund's organizers were arrested and charged with charity fraud and money laundering. Regarding the arrests, Georgia Attorney General Chris Carr pledged to “not rest until we have held accountable every person who has funded, organized, or participated in this violence and intimidation” regarding the protests. All fifteen charges of money laundering against three ASF organizers were eventually dropped in September.

=== June - September 2023 public referendum ===
On June 6, 2023, the Atlanta City Council approved the $31 million funding after more than 16 hours of in-person public comment from over 300 speakers, the vast majority of whom were opposed to the project. More than 1,000 people signed up to speak, but hundreds of people were not admitted to the building. A minority of speakers supported the project, stating that opponents do not represent the people of Atlanta.

In June 2023, a coalition of activist groups opposed to the construction project announced their plans to force a referendum that would cancel the city's lease to the APF for Cop City. The Georgia constitution allows residents to force a referendum on decisions by local governments if they can get 15% of registered voters to sign petition; in Atlanta, 60,000 to 70,000 signatures would be required. The city said cancellation of the lease would not be legal.

In September 2023, organizers submitted 116,000 signatures for the referendum, but the City Council refused to count them, and said the activists had missed the deadline to turn in the signatures. That deadline had been extended by US District Judge Mark Cohen, but the city's appeal of that decision got held up for over a year in the 11th Circuit Court of Appeals, and had not resolved as of April, 2025. In January 2026, the 11th Circuit panel ruled 2-1 that the petition to force a referendum was invalid.

=== September 2023 RICO conspiracy indictment ===
In September 2023, sixty-one people who had been arrested in the forest or at stop cop city protests were charged with racketeering under Georgia's RICO law. This indictment is likely the largest criminal conspiracy case ever filed against protestors in the US.

As of April 2025, the racketeering case was stalled. Defendants in the case maintained their innocence and reported difficulty getting work and other hardships while they awaited trial for more than 20 months. Some of the 61 were required to leave the state while the case was ongoing, though obliged to return to Atlanta for trial. On December 30, 2025, Fulton County Judge Kevin Farmer dismissed the racketeering charges against the 61 defendants while declining to dismiss terrorism charges for the five defendants charged in the same indictment. The decision is under appeal.

=== September - November 2023 construction site protests ===
On September 7, 2023, two days after the RICO charges were announced, a group of clergy members and people of faith ran on to the Cop City construction site and chained themselves to a bulldozer. The action temporarily stopped work at the site. Five people were arrested as part of the action and charged with trespassing. On November 8, four "elders" were arrested after using their bodies to block one of the entrances to the Cop City construction site.

On November 13, a group of over 400 protestors attempted to march into the construction site as part of the "Block Cop City" mobilization. Atlanta Police deployed pepper spray, tear gas, flash-bang grenades, and armored tanks in order to stop the march from advancing.

=== 2024 protests ===
From January to March 2024, there were a series of civil disobedience direct actions at Brasfield & Gorrie construction sites in Atlanta. The stated goal of these actions was to pressure Brasfield & Gorrie to drop their contract to construct Cop City. The first of these actions occurred on January 29 when two people chained themselves to equipment at a Brasfield & Gorrie worksite in mid-town Atlanta. On March 7 a similar action took place at another worksite which led to one arrest. Then on March 27 two people scaled a 250 foot tall crane at a Brasfield & Gorrie construction site. The pair unfurled a banner that read "Drop Cop City" and then chained themselves to the crane. They were arrested and charged with felony false imprisonment.

In February 2024 there were multiple protests in Arizona targeting Nationwide Mutual Insurance Company over their role in providing insurance to the Atlanta Police Foundation. At one protest, people staged a sit in which involved using concrete filled tires to block the entrance to neighborhood home to a Nationwide executive.

In April 2024, protesters organized a disturbance in front of Emory's Commencement stage against Cop City and the university's ties to Israel amid the war in Gaza. The university stated that the protesters were not members of the Emory University community. A statement from protest organizers accused the university of being “complicit in genocide and police militarization” and called for "total institutional divestment from Israeli apartheid and Cop City at all Atlanta colleges and universities." Georgia State Patrol, Atlanta Police and University Police forcefully dispersed the interlopers, allegedly using tear gas, rubber bullets, and tasers. 28 people were arrested, many with ties to Emory University.

=== 2025 Indictment over phone deletion ===
In January 2025, Samuel Tunick was stopped by CBP agents when returning from vacation at Hartsfield-Jackson Atlanta International Airport. Tunick was placed in secondary inspection, questioned and searched by CBP and FBI agents. According to Tunick's attorneys, after repeatedly ignored requests to speak with counsel and government demands to unlock his phone, Tunick provided agents with a 'duress' passcode. As the phone was a Google Pixel running GrapheneOS, the duress code wiped the phone of all contents. While initially agents stated their search was related to possible child pornography, investigators later retracted those claims and the search is believed to relate to Tunick's involvement with the Defend the Atlanta Forest movement. While released from CBP custody at the time, Tunick was later indicted in November 2025 with one count of destruction of property to prevent seizure.

== Issues and themes ==
=== Domestic terrorism charges ===
Legal scholars, protesters, and state and local governments were interested in the precedent the domestic terrorism charges would set for similar cases. Supporters said it would deter criminal behavior, while critics called it overreach that would stifle legitimate protest.

In March 2023, several human rights groups co-signed a letter which said that "application of the domestic terrorism statute" against 19 of the 35 arrested March 2023 protestors "is an escalatory intimidation tactic and a draconian step that seems intended to chill First Amendment protected activity". The groups that signed the letter included Amnesty International, Human Rights Watch, the National Lawyers Guild, and the Center for Constitutional Rights.

=== Internationalism ===
Nearly half of the trainees at Cop City will come from outside of Georgia, and Stop Cop City participants have been drawn from all over the country. Proponents of the facility have argued that these participants are "outside agitators" that don't represent Atlanta.

Organizers have also pointed to the decades-long partnership between Atlanta Police and Israeli Police forces that is facilitated by the Georgia International Law Enforcement Exchange program, and made connections between the struggle against Cop City, the war in Gaza, and allegations of Palestinian genocide. The movement has received significant international solidarity, especially after the killing of Tortuguita.

Organizers have also connected the struggle against Cop City with the role of the US in driving militarization of police in Latin America.

== Responses ==
In Spring 2023, students and faculty from Georgia State University, Emory University, Agnes Scott College, Morehouse College, and Spelman College petitioned their institutions to officially denounce the training center. None had as of April 2025.

On April 25, 2023, 20 protesters pitched tents in front of Emory University's Commencement stage to urge university leadership to denounce the training center. Those 20 also asked that Emory University President Greg Fenves step down as a member of the Atlanta Committee for Progress (ACP), which played a role in building the project; Fenves maintained his participation. The protest ended when Emory Police ordered students to leave or be arrested.

In 2023, Chris Carr, the Georgia Attorney General, defended bringing charges of domestic terrorism against protestors.

== See also ==
- Atlanta tree canopy
- Crime in Atlanta
- Zone to Defend (ZAD)
