= Old Atlanta Prison Farm =

Abandoned prison complex in Atlanta, Georgia

Coordinates: 33°41′50″N 84°20′06″W

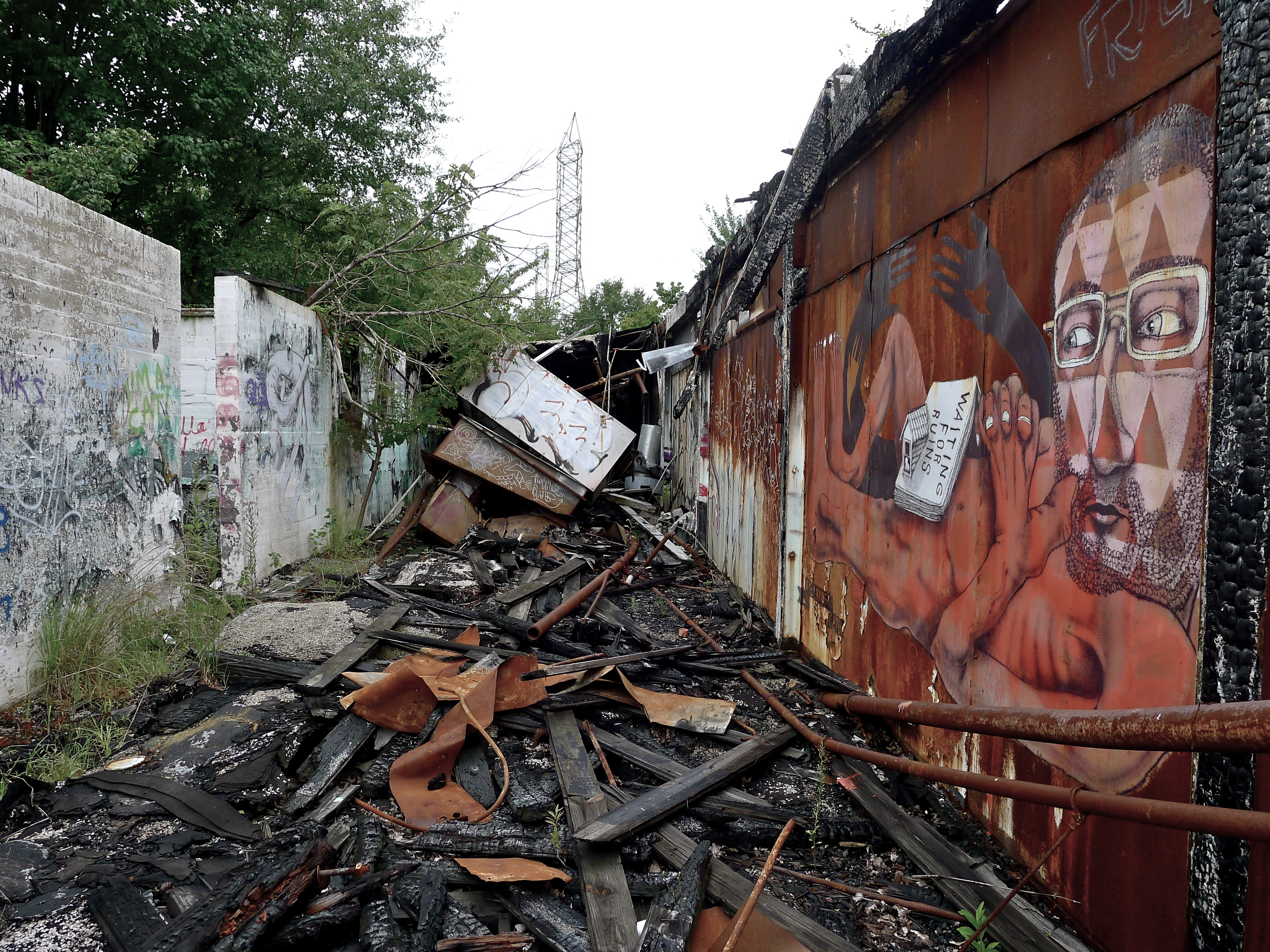
A mural amidst debris and abandoned buildings at the Old Atlanta Prison Farm

The Old Atlanta Prison Farm is an abandoned, city-owned prison complex in southwest DeKalb County in the U.S. state of Georgia. From approximately 1920 to 1990, the farm was worked by prisoners to produce food for the region's prison system. There are limited historical records detailing the operation of the farm, especially after 1965.

The prison farm is located in the South River Forest, a 3,500-acre (14 km^{2}) green space inside the Atlanta perimeter that conservationists have sought to protect since 2000. A controversial police training facility, dubbed Cop City by opponents, was approved for construction on the site of the prison farm by the Atlanta City Council in September 2021. Opponents say the project is an example of environmental racism and have opposed that project by occupying the forest around the prison farm, leading to several conflicts with Atlanta police.

== History and farm operation ==
The Old Atlanta Prison Farm began operating in 1922 and saw its heaviest production during the 1950s. By 1959, the farm was producing 880 tons of food and generated $115,000 in profit for the prison system. Products produced at the farm included pork, vegetables and milk.

The majority of prisoners had been arrested for "public inebriation" and related crimes. Prisoners frequently went on strike to demand better food, sanitation, and medical care, and to protest the prison's habit of releasing prisoners downtown late at night with nowhere to go. Beginning in the 1970s, the prison's agricultural operations were "scaled back down to dairy and livestock—250 cows, 300 hogs, 145 prisoners—and abandoned field by field." It was closed officially in the 1990s.

A 1999 historical analysis of the prison farm by Jillian Wootten of the Atlanta Department of City Planning stated that the farm was owned and operated as a federal prison from 1918 to 1965, when it was acquired by the City of Atlanta. In 2021, the Atlanta Community Press Collective analyzed city and press archives and concluded that Wootten's 1999 report conflated three different properties used by prison systems in Atlanta, and that the prison farm was never federally owned. Wootten's report described the farm as a relatively low-security establishment for non-violent offenders from its inception until the city's acquisition of the farm in 1965, after which there are limited records. The 2021 report by the Atlanta Community Press Collective found evidence of, "systemic abuse, torture, overcrowding, neglect, and racialized violence throughout the prison farm's history, as well as the possibility that unmarked graves of prisoners exist on the grounds."

Wootten found that the prison farm should be listed on the National Register of Historic Places and recommended that it be preserved as a "valuable, environmentally rich and historic place".

Civil rights leader Stokely Carmichael was briefly held at the farm as a political prisoner during the civil rights movement.

== Save the Old Atlanta Prison Farm ==
For two decades, the grassroots organization Save the Old Atlanta Prison Farm advocated for converting the wooded abandoned prison farm into a public park. Members built and maintained trails in the forest and led historical walking tours for neighbors as part of their advocacy.

== South River Forest ==
The Old Atlanta Prison Farm is situated within the South River Forest, a 3500-acre green space that conservationists and some residents have argued should be preserved. Atlanta has the largest tree canopy of any major US city and is known as the 'city in the forest'. Two organizations, the South River Forest coalition and the South River Watershed Alliance, have filed lawsuits against the development projects that threaten the forest. These developments include a controversial police training facility and a land swap between the city and the film industry.

== Police training facility ==
In September 2021, the City of Atlanta approved plans to build an 85-acre (34-ha) police training facility on the site of the old prison farm. The vote was contested and had to be delayed to make time for over 17 hours of public comment, most of which opposed the development. The $90 million training facility is partially funded by the city and partially by the Atlanta Police Foundation (APF).

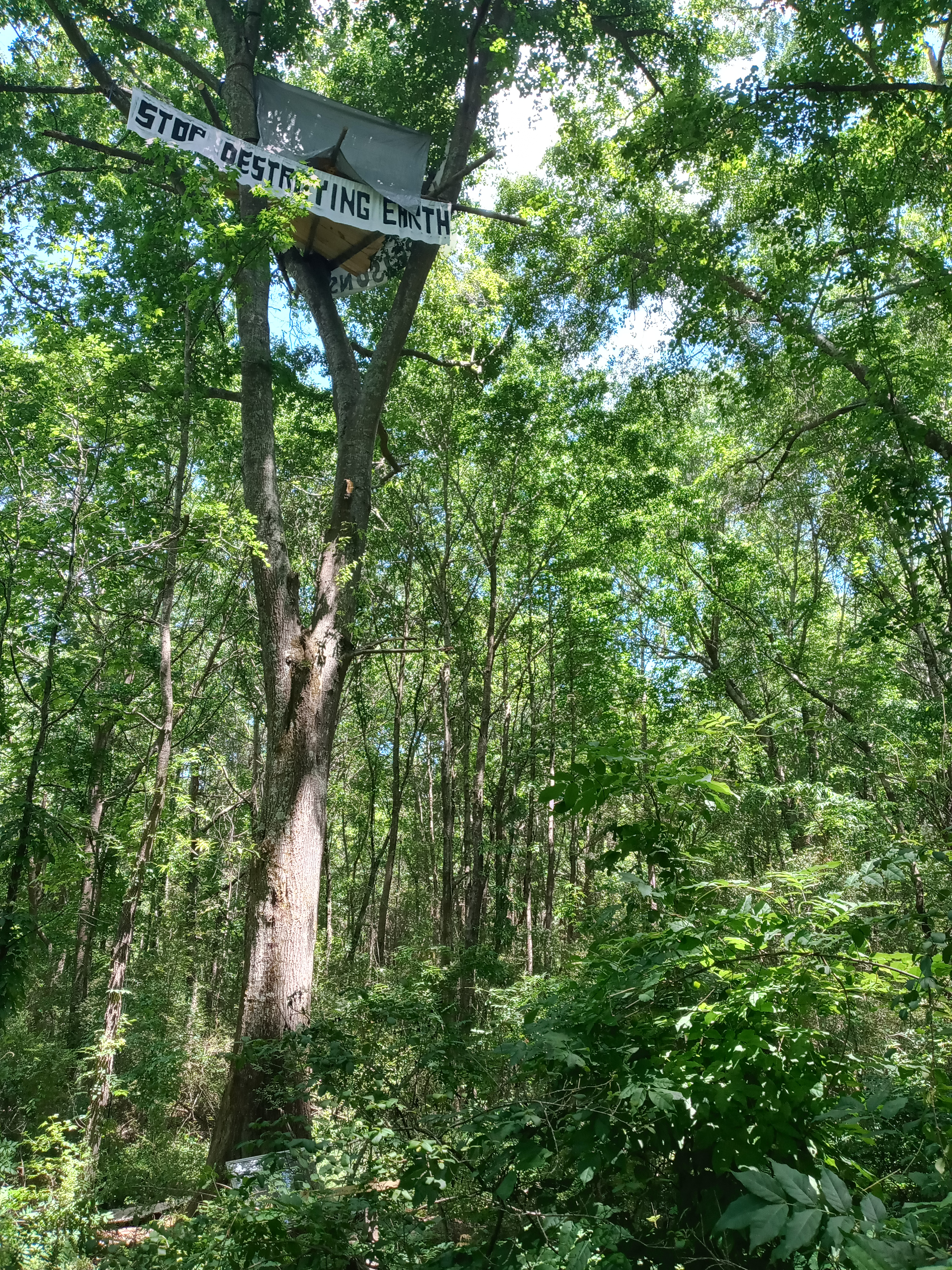
A tree sit to prevent cutting of trees at the Old Atlanta prison farm

In order to prevent construction of the facility, protesters or forest defenders have built encampments, tree sits, and blockades to prevent the entry of construction teams and police. There have been confrontations between police and forest defenders, leading to multiple arrests.

Forest defenders have discussed the APF development in the context of settler colonialism and environmental racism. Opposition to the project has stemmed from ongoing complaints against the Atlanta Police Department for police brutality in the context of the George Floyd protests and the Black Lives Matter movement. Opponents say that construction of the police training facility will lead to increased police brutality, and particularly object to the placement of the facility on the site of alleged human rights violations associated with the prison farm. They also note that the proposed facility is larger than similar projects owned by other large US cities.

The city says that the training facility is necessary to fight rising crime and that the old prison farm is the only feasible site. Supporters say the facility would help with police recruitment and retention. They also say the development includes plans for green space.
