= South River Forest =

Forest in Atlanta, Georgia, U.S.

Coordinates: 33°40′50″N 84°20′30″W

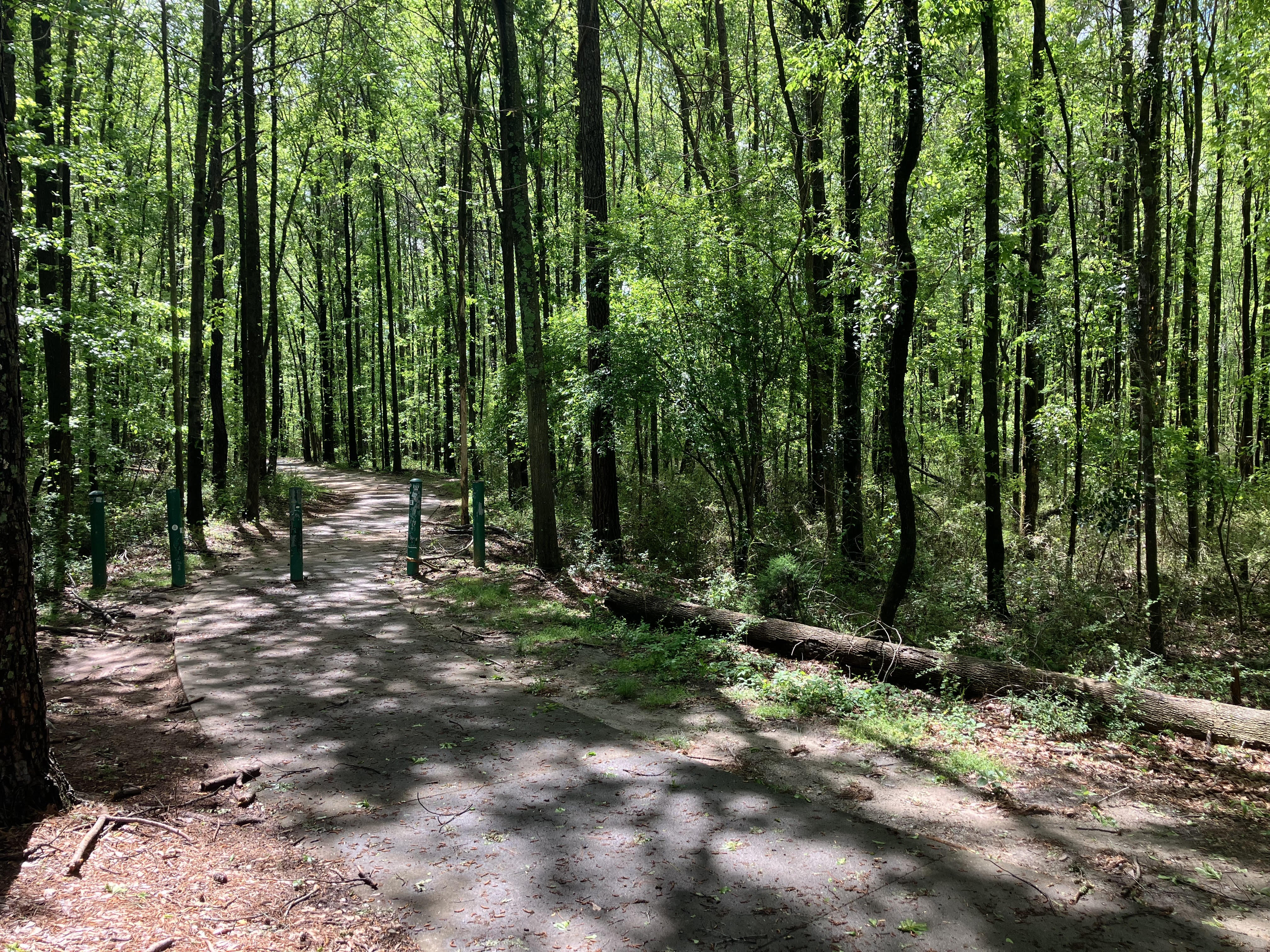
Dolls Head Trail Entrance (April 2025)

The South River Forest or Weelaunee Forest is an area in southeast metro Atlanta, DeKalb County, Georgia, United States named after the nearby South River. The South River is also known by its Muscogee Creek name, the "Weelaunee". The area includes significant disparate, undeveloped forested parcels that help protect the river and tributaries. The area was originally identified and named the "South River Park" by Atlanta's Department of City Planning (Aspiring to the Beloved Community, 2017 Design for Nature section, pages 320-349) and identified as one of the lungs of Atlanta to be established as a conservation zone. Subsequently, The Nature Conservancy, the South River Watershed Alliance, South River Forest Coalition, Save the Old Atlanta Prison Farm, and others collaborated in an effort to hold Atlanta accountable to its conservation plan for the area.

In 2021, local community members and Muscogee Creek representatives dubbed the South River Forest the "Weelaunee Forest". The area itself is made up of disparate forested parcels that protect Atlanta's urban South River and its tributaries. The forest once held a prison farm, and it is a proposed site for a police training facility that has garnered protests.

== History ==
The Muscogee people inhabited the area and referred to the South River as the "Weelaunee", loosely meaning green-brown water, until they were forcibly displaced in the 1820s and 1830s. Inscribed stones from a Carnegie library are among items dumped in the area.

In 1999, Jillian Wootten wrote a historical analysis of the honor farm facility in the forest. Plans to officially designate the area as a national park began in the early 2010s; a smaller portion of it was designated the South River Park in 2017 by the Atlanta City Planning Commissioner Tim Keane.

== Developmental threats ==
The South River's largest urban tributary, Intrenchment Creek, flows through the South River Forest. East of Intrenchment Creek, in unincorporated DeKalb County, lies 136-acre Intrenchment Creek Park (ICP) Intrenchment Creek Park (DeKalb County). In January 2021, DeKalb County approved a land exchange that gave 40 acres of public parkland at ICP to real estate mogul Ryan Millsap who was then CEO of Blackhall Studios. Community efforts to prevent the exchange began in 2018, when it was first discovered that DeKalb County was in negotiations with Millsap, and were dubbed Stop The Swap. Ongoing efforts to reclaim the land for the public include the Stop The Swap citizens lawsuit. Shortly after DeKalb County leadership approved the land exchange, under the leadership of District 3 Commissioner Larry Johnson and CEO Michael Thurmond, Millsap sold Blackhall Studios (now known as Shadowbox Studios) and retained the 40 acres of former public parkland for himself.

Due west of ICP, on the other side of Intrenchment Creek, is 296 acres owned by City of Atlanta that was the Old Atlanta Prison Farm. A 171-acre police training facility was proposed for construction at the site in 2021. A decentralized protest movement called Stop Cop City formed in opposition to the construction of the facility—which opponents commonly refer to as Cop City. Several protestors were arrested and one protester, Tortuguita, was killed by police in the forest in January 2023.

== See also ==
- Atlanta tree canopy
- Cop City
- Stop Cop City
- Treaty of Indian Springs
