= Atlanta tree canopy =

Tree coverage in Atlanta

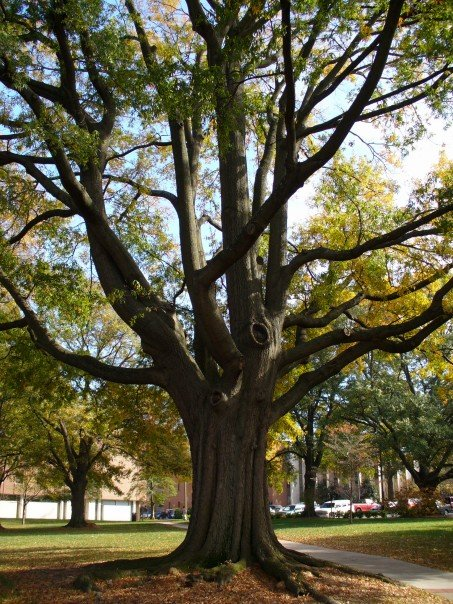
Trees on the campus of Georgia Tech

The American city of Atlanta, Georgia, has a reputation as the "city in a forest" due to its abundance of trees, uncommon among major cities. Tree coverage was estimated at 47.9% for 2008, in a 2014 study.

== Context ==
Atlanta, often called a "city in a forest" and a "tree haven", has a large tree canopy covering much of its area. The city's main street is named after a tree, and beyond the Downtown, Midtown, and Buckhead business districts, the skyline gives way to a dense canopy of woods that spreads into the suburbs. The city's tree coverage percentage was estimated at 36% in a 2004 model. A 2010 study estimated its tree coverage at 50-53%.

Atlanta's tree coverage does not go unnoticed—it was the main reason cited by National Geographic in naming Atlanta a "Place of a Lifetime":

For a sprawling city with the nation’s ninth-largest metro area, Atlanta is surprisingly lush with trees—magnolias, dogwoods, Southern pines, and magnificent oaks.

The city's lush tree canopy, which filters out pollutants and cools sidewalks and buildings, has increasingly been under assault from man and nature due to heavy rains, drought, aged forests, new pests, and urban construction. A 2001 study found that Atlanta's heavy tree cover declined from 48% in 1974 to 38% in 1996. This loss of tree canopy resulted in a 33% increase in stormwater runoff, and a loss of 11 million pounds of pollutants removed annually, a value of approximately $28 million per year. Due to the 2006–2008 Southeastern United States drought, Atlanta lost trees at an unprecedented rate. For example, Piedmont Park lost about a dozen large, historic trees in 2009, compared to two or three during normal years. Although many of Atlanta's trees are between 80 and 100 years old and thus reaching the end of their normal lifespan, the drought accelerated their demise by shrinking the trees' roots. However, the problem is being addressed by community organizations and city government. Trees Atlanta, a non-profit organization founded in 1985, has planted and distributed over 126,000 shade trees. Atlanta's city government awarded $130,000 in grants to neighborhood groups to plant trees.

The city is home to the Atlanta Dogwood Festival, an annual arts and crafts festival held one weekend during early April, when the native dogwoods are in bloom.

== Clearcutting ==
Proposed construction of a police training facility in the South River Forest—an 80-acre greenspace (32 ha) in southeast Atlanta and Dekalb county—has led to ongoing protests. Conservationists and activists oppose the project and built encampments in and around the old Atlanta prison farm during 2021 and 2022. This has led to multiple confrontations with police.

The low-density residential subdivision development that dominates the Atlanta area has historically not been required to replace lost tree inventory. Because of larger lot sizes and natural-looking architecture, such as California contemporary, older neighborhoods typically have many mature forest trees, except in cases where they have been destroyed by homeowners. Increasing density allowed by zoning since the 1980s has meant fewer and fewer trees left, and by the 2000s it became common for developers to completely clearcut dozens of acres of forest and bulldoze all hills flat to build generic tract housing, often with tightly packed homes nearly touching each other and up against the street. However, over the past decade some area cities and counties have revised their tree ordinances to require tree recompense to be equal to or greater than the pre-development tree density, trying to ensure a future tree canopy. Rather than leaving trees on each home lot as before, this typically involves a set-aside of green space in each development, with most other areas still clear-cut. Even when some trees are replaced, it is with a single type of trees planted the same distance from each other, rather than different trees at random placement and age as in the native forest. At a rate of 50 acres (20 hectares) per day, the deforestation brought by land development has had a significant impact on area watersheds, as they now flood far more rapidly and to a much greater extent than prior to development.

== Commentary ==
The American Institute of Architecture's 1993 Guide to the Architecture of Atlanta wrote:

[T]he city's greatest natural asset, its lush vegetation and gently rolling topography, which eighty years ago enabled Druid Hills to become one of the most beautiful Olmstedian garden suburbs in North America, distinguishes Atlanta's highway architecture from suburban office complexes in other boom towns like Houston and Tampa.

Author Tom Wolfe wrote in A Man in Full:

He looked away from the buildings and out over the ocean of trees. Since Atlanta was not a port city and was, in fact, far inland, the trees stretched on in every direction. They were Atlanta's greatest natural resource, those trees were. People loved to live beneath them.

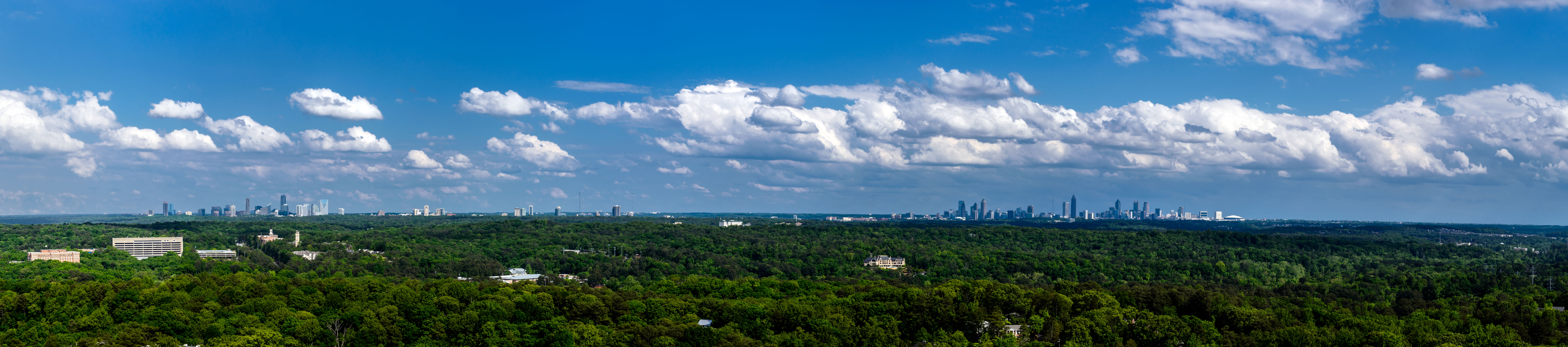
The topography and geography of Atlanta

== See also ==
- Cop City
- List of trees of Georgia (U.S. state)
- Lungs of Atlanta
- Natural history of Georgia (U.S. state)
