= Keisha Lance Bottoms =

Governor-elect of Georgia (born 1970)

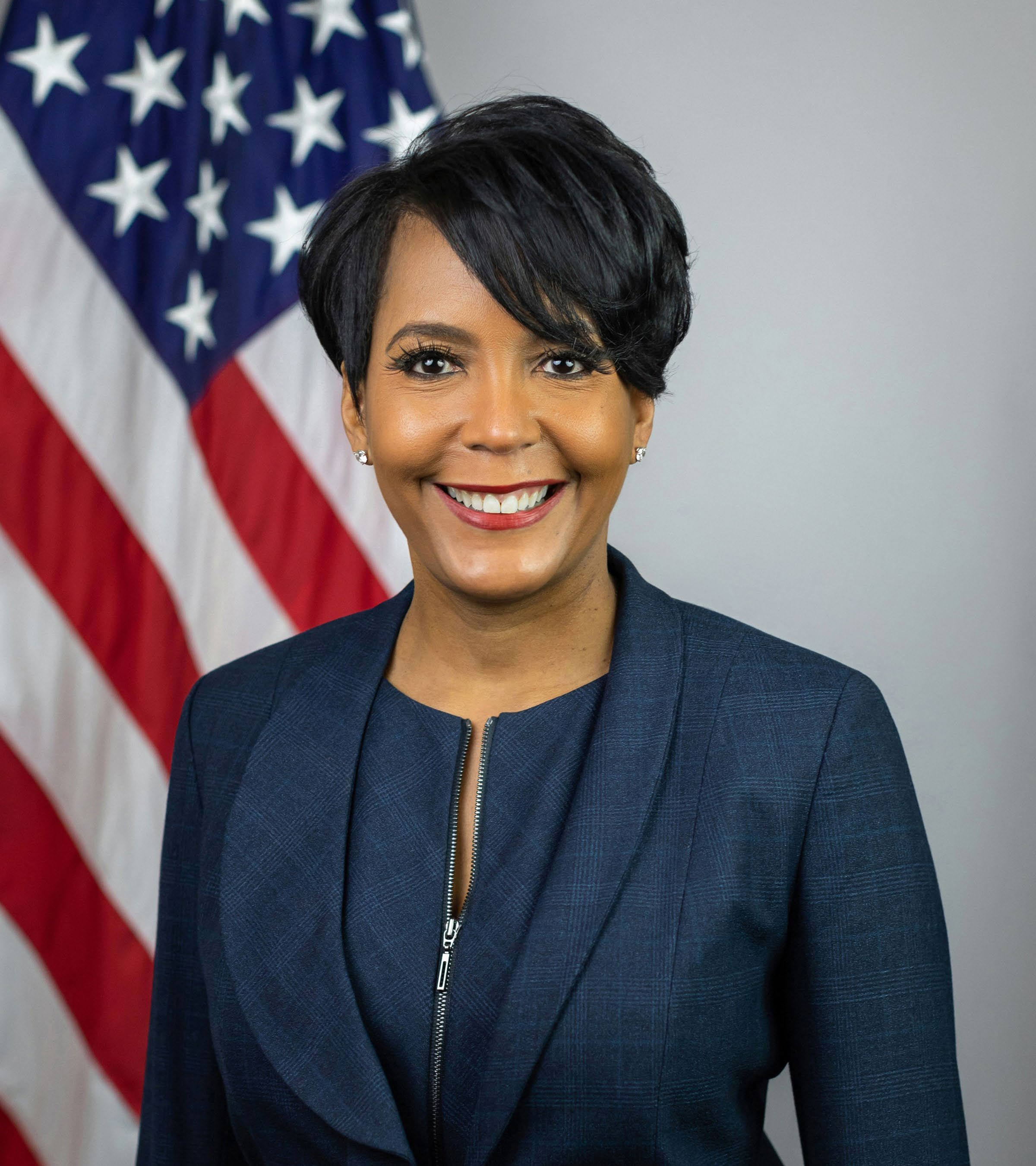
- Official portrait, 2022

Governor-elect of Georgia
- Assuming office January 11, 2027
- Lieutenant: Josh McLaurin (elect)
- Succeeding: Brian Kemp

Director of the Office of Public Engagement Senior Advisor to the President
- In office July 1, 2022 – April 1, 2023
- President: Joe Biden
- Preceded by: Cedric Richmond
- Succeeded by: Stephen K. Benjamin

60th Mayor of Atlanta
- In office January 2, 2018 – January 3, 2022
- Preceded by: Kasim Reed
- Succeeded by: Andre Dickens

Member of the Atlanta City Council from the 11th district
- In office January 4, 2010 – January 2, 2018
- Preceded by: Jim Maddox
- Succeeded by: Marci Collier Overstreet

Personal details
- Born: Keisha Lance; January 18, 1970 (age 56) Atlanta, Georgia, U.S.
- Party: Democratic
- Spouse: Derek Bottoms (m. 1994)
- Children: 4
- Parent: Major Lance (father)
- Relatives: Ruby Doris Smith-Robinson (aunt)
- Education: Florida A&M University (BA); Georgia State University (JD)
- Website: Personal website; Campaign website

Keisha Lance Bottoms (née Lance; born January 18, 1970) is an American attorney and politician who is the governor-elect of Georgia. A member of the Democratic Party, she served from 2018 to 2022 as the 60th mayor of Atlanta and from 2010 to 2018 as a member of the Atlanta City Council, representing part of Southwest Atlanta.

Bottoms was elected mayor in 2017 and did not seek reelection in 2021. In 2021, President Joe Biden nominated her to serve as vice chair of civic engagement and voter protection at the Democratic National Committee. In 2022, she joined the Biden administration as senior advisor and director of the White House Office of Public Engagement, where she served until 2023. Bottoms formerly served as a member of the President's Export Council.

Bottoms won the 2026 Georgia gubernatorial election, defeating Republican nominee Rick Jackson and becoming the first Black woman elected governor of a U.S. state. Upon inauguration, Bottoms will also become Georgia's first Black and first female governor.

== Early life and education ==
Bottoms was born in Atlanta, Georgia, on January 18, 1970, to Sylvia Robinson and Major Lance, an American R&B singer who had a number of US hits in the 1960s, including "The Monkey Time" and "Um, Um, Um, Um, Um, Um". She was raised in Atlanta and is a graduate of Frederick Douglass High School.

She earned a bachelor's degree in communications from Florida A&M University, concentrating in broadcast journalism. She earned a J.D. degree from Georgia State University College of Law in 1994. She is a member of Delta Sigma Theta sorority.

== Early career ==
Bottoms was a prosecutor and also represented children in juvenile court. In 2002, she became a magistrate judge in Atlanta. In 2008, she ran unsuccessfully for a judgeship on the Fulton Superior Court.

Bottoms was elected to the Atlanta City Council in 2009 and 2013, representing District 11 in southwest Atlanta. She served until 2018. She was concurrently the executive director of Atlanta Fulton County Recreation Authority starting in 2015.

In 2017, Bottoms used $40,000 of taxpayer money to send out a 58-page end of year city council district flyer which included 80 pictures of herself. The mailer was also sent outside of her district, leading to a campaign finance complaint. An ethics investigation found that Bottoms wrongly accepted $6,900 in contributions exceeding the individual donation limit and erroneously kept $110,797 of post-election contributions that exceeded campaign debt repayment needs. She was fined $37,000.

== Mayor of Atlanta ==
=== Election ===
Bottoms was elected mayor of Atlanta in 2017, after receiving a plurality of votes (26%) in a crowded field of candidates on election day, then defeating fellow city council member Mary Norwood in the runoff election. She is the sixth African American and the second African American woman to serve as mayor of Atlanta.

Bottoms was investigated during the mayoral election for several lump sum payments to campaign staff totaling more than $180,000 that were not reported properly. In October 2017, she voluntarily returned $25,700 in campaign contributions she had received from PRAD Group, an engineering contractor whose office had been raided by the Federal Bureau of Investigation the previous month. On November 4, 2017, she called on the attorney general of Georgia to investigate numerous robocalls falsely made in her name.

=== Tenure ===
Bottoms said Atlanta was a "welcoming city" and "will remain open and welcoming to all" after President Donald Trump's actions regarding refugees in the United States. In 2018, she signed an executive order forbidding the city jail to hold ICE detainees. In July 2019, Bottoms said, "Our city does not support ICE. We don't have a relationship with the U.S. Marshal[s] Service. We closed our detention center to ICE detainees, and we would not pick up people on an immigration violation."

In February 2020, Bottoms released Atlanta's first LGBTQ Affairs report that focused on how various policies, initiatives, and programs can improve the lives of LGBTQ Atlantans. In 2018, she had created the city's first LGBTQ advisory board, which included entertainer Miss Lawrence and activist Feroza Syed. In December 2020, Bottoms appointed the city's first director of LGBTQ Affairs, Malik Brown, and announced the continued LGBTQ advisory board leadership.

Bottoms strongly rebuked Georgia Governor Brian Kemp after he announced the reopening of Georgia businesses in April 2020, saying that it was too early in the COVID-19 pandemic.

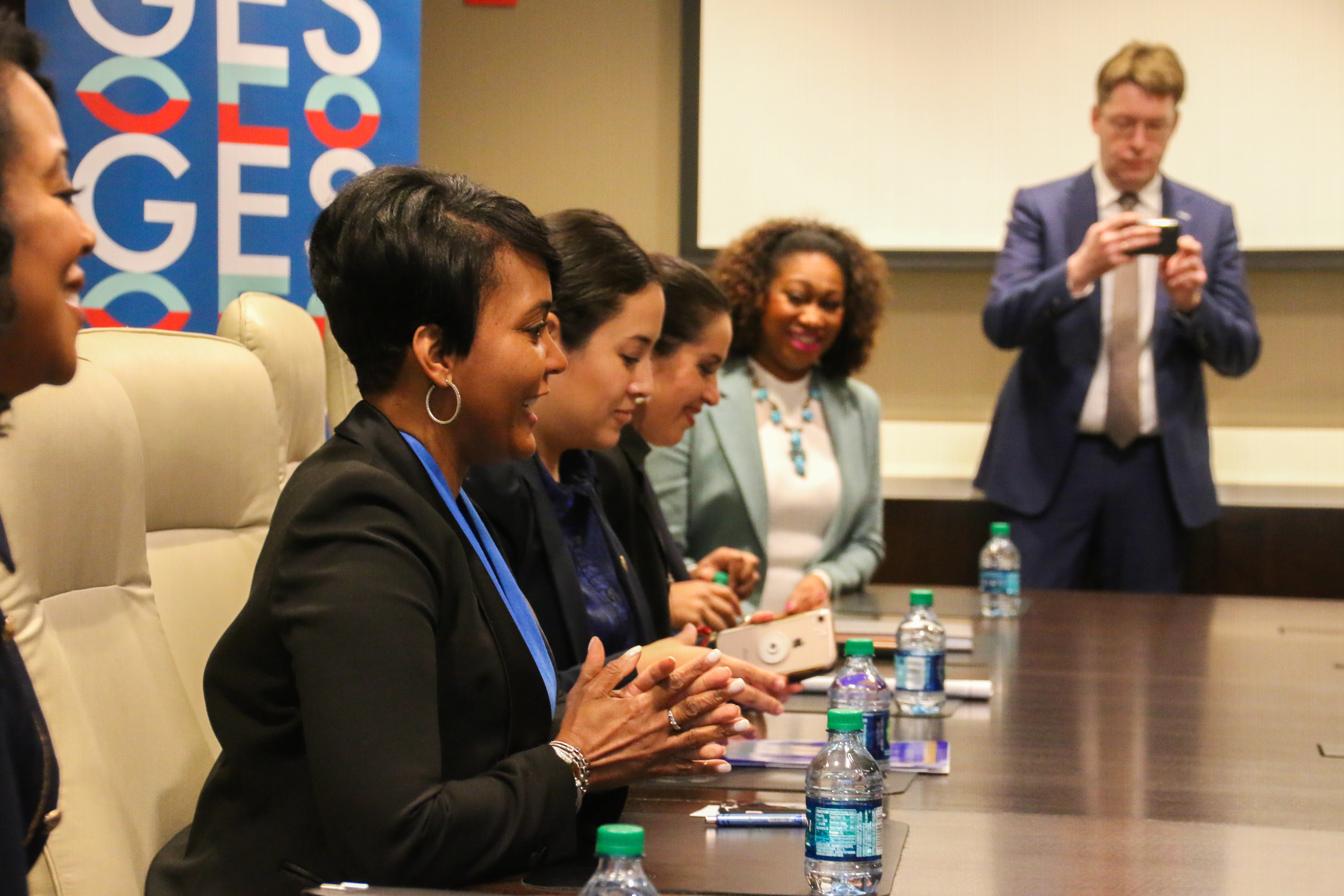
Mayor Bottoms at Atlanta City Hall in March 2019

When Atlanta experienced riots in the wake of the murder of George Floyd, Bottoms condemned those involved, but later expressed optimism while speaking to demonstrators at a protest, saying, "There is something better on the other side of this." She also repeatedly condemned Trump for "making it worse" and stoking racial tensions, and encouraged people to vote, saying, "If you want change in America, go and register to vote. That is the change we need in this country." In June 2020, many Atlanta Police Department officers went on strike to protest the charges brought against the officers involved in the killing of Rayshard Brooks. Bottoms said that APD morale "is down tenfold".

In early July 2020, as COVID-19 cases escalated in Atlanta, Bottoms issued an executive order rolling back some of its reopening measures from Phase 2 to Phase 1 and requiring everyone within the city limits to wear a facial covering, but no citations enforcing it were issued. On July 15, Georgia Governor Brian Kemp issued an order suspending all local mask mandates, and on July 16 he filed suit against Bottoms in Superior Court, seeking to invalidate her order and prevent her from talking about it. He did not file similar suits against other Georgia cities with mask mandates, such as Savannah and Athens. A hearing scheduled for July 21 was postponed when the judge recused herself.

In May 2021, Bottoms announced she would not run for reelection in the 2021 Atlanta mayoral election.

=== 2020 presidential election ===
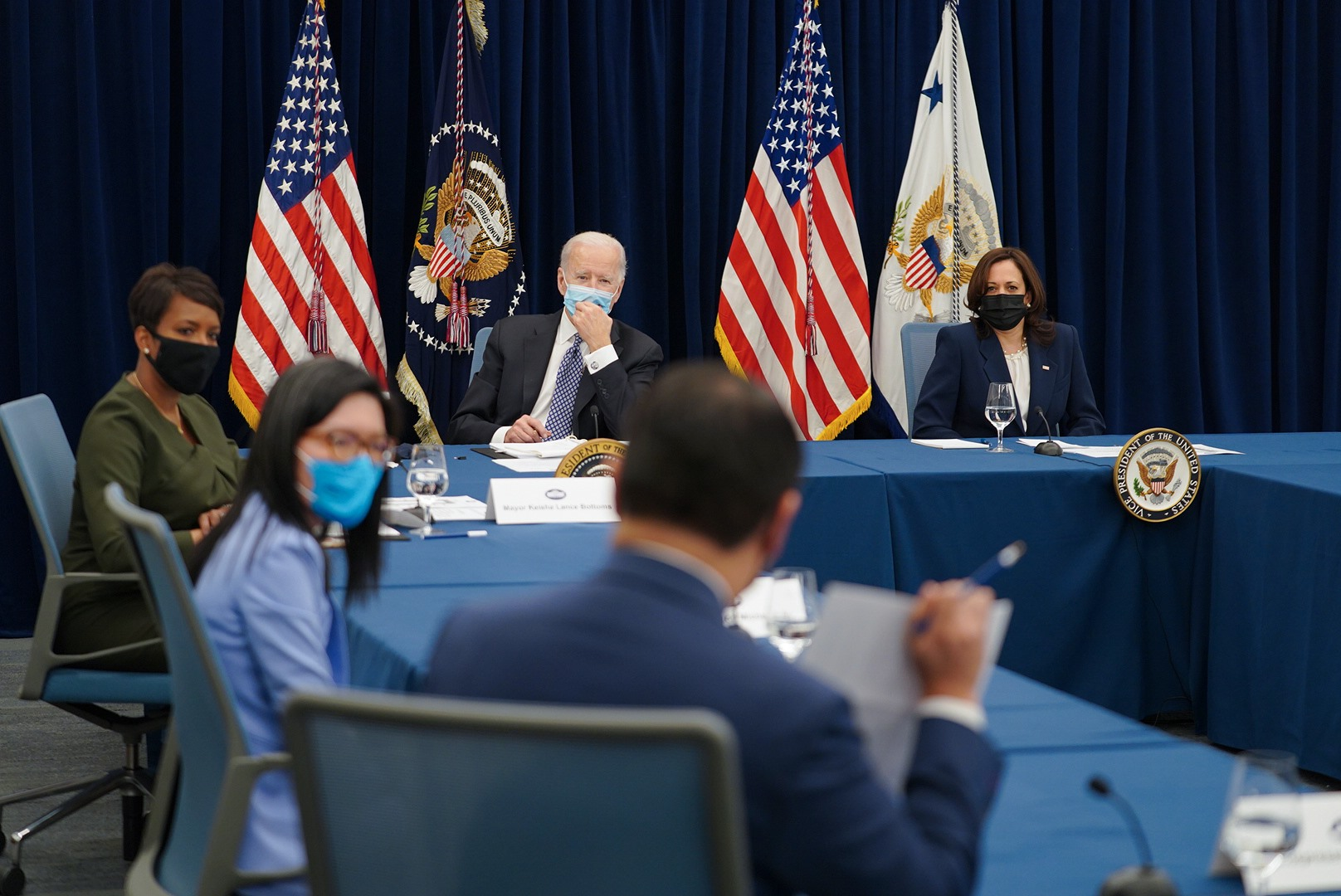
Bottoms at a meeting with President Biden and Vice President Harris following the 2021 Atlanta spa shootings

In June 2019, Bottoms endorsed Joe Biden in the 2020 Democratic Party presidential primaries. After Biden promised during a March 2020 CNN debate to choose a woman as his running mate, Politico reported her as a possible pick. In June, CNN reported that Bottoms was among his top four choices, along with Representative Val Demings and Senators Kamala Harris and Elizabeth Warren.

Bottoms was named a permanent co-chair of the 2020 Democratic National Convention, at which she was featured as a speaker.

== Biden administration ==
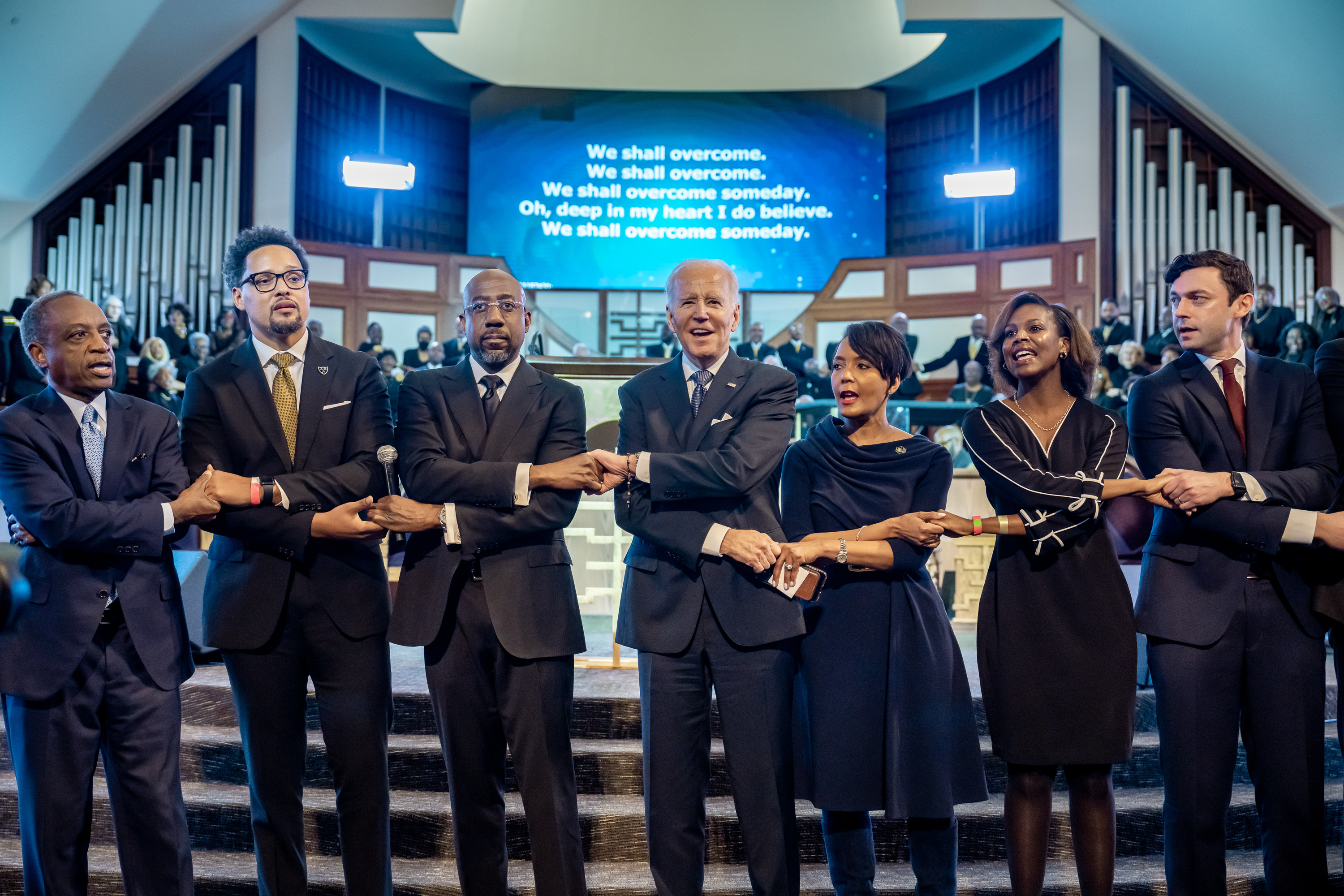
Bottoms (third from right) with Biden (center) in 2023

After Biden's election, Bottoms was mentioned as a possible candidate for United States Secretary of Housing and Urban Development. In January 2021, Biden nominated Bottoms for a four-year term as the vice chair of civic engagement and voter participation at the Democratic National Committee, a role focused on protecting voting rights and expanding voter participation.

In June 2022, President Joe Biden announced that he had picked Bottoms to replace Cedric Richmond as the director of the Office of Public Liaison. On February 27, 2023, it was announced that Bottoms would be replaced by Stephen K. Benjamin in April 2023. On July 14, 2023, Biden appointed Bottoms to the President's Export Council. On January 20, 2025, it was reported that she was fired from office by President Donald Trump, although Bottoms has contended that she resigned the day prior without announcing her resignation publicly.

== Governor-elect of Georgia ==
=== 2026 election ===
On April 4, 2025, Bottoms announced her candidacy for the Democratic nomination for governor of Georgia in 2026. On May 19, 2026, she won the Democratic nomination in a seven person primary.

She won the general election, and upon inauguration, she will become Georgia's first Black and first female governor, and the first Black woman to serve as governor of a U.S. state.

== Personal life ==
Bottoms' family history can be traced back five generations to Shepherd Peek, a freedman from a plantation near Crawfordville, who may have served in the Georgia state legislature during Reconstruction.

In October 1994, she married Derek W. Bottoms at Ben Hill United Methodist Church in Atlanta. They met three years earlier during their first year as students at Georgia State University College of Law. After unsuccessful attempts to conceive biologically, they adopted their four children.

Her husband is the vice president of employment practices and associate relations for The Home Depot. He joined the company in 2000, after spending more than five years at the law firm of Powell Goldstein. He has served as a board member for several foundations.

Bottoms is a member of The Links, a social and service organization of prominent Black women that was founded in 1946 and is based in Washington, D.C.

== Environmental record ==
In February 2018 Bottoms signed an ordinance transferring 31 properties to Atlanta Public Schools, which had sued the city in 2015 for the deeds to school sites. The properties included Cheney Field, the site of Cheney Stadium in Summerhill. The form deed attached to the ordinance reserved to the city a perpetual easement across each property for water and sewer utilities.

In March 2019 the city council adopted Clean Energy Atlanta, a plan the Mayor's Office of Resilience prepared with city departments and community groups to move Atlanta to 100 percent clean energy by 2035. On the office's recommendation, the resolution adopting the plan moved the deadline for municipal operations from 2025, set by the council in 2017, to 2035 and added interim targets. In a 2023 column, Sally Bethea, the retired executive director of Chattahoochee Riverkeeper, wrote that during the Bottoms administration "sustainability programs were buried within another office where they languished for years".

In Peoplestown, her administration continued the eminent domain cases the city had filed in 2016 against homeowners on a block it planned to clear for a stormwater pond and park after flooding in 2012. In April 2019 Bottoms met with one of the families and its engineer, and her office asked for and received an alternative design from the engineer. Two of the remaining owners received eviction notices in September and October 2021, and in November she told the city's law department to begin eviction proceedings against them. Bottoms said in a statement that her administration "has negotiated in good faith with the parties". The city settled with the remaining owners in 2022, under her successor, Andre Dickens.

In 2021 Bottoms backed a plan to lease 85 acres of city-owned land at the Old Atlanta Prison Farm in DeKalb County to the Atlanta Police Foundation for the Atlanta Public Safety Training Center. She called the project a "sensible reform" and said a new facility for police "is something that can't wait". The city council approved the lease by a vote of 10 to 4 on September 8, 2021. Rough Draft Atlanta reported that 70 percent of the callers during 17 hours of public comment had opposed it. The 85 acres were part of a larger tract the city had earmarked for green space. Environmental groups said that clearing much of the forest could harm nearby communities and the South River. In an interview with the Associated Press as she launched her campaign for governor in May 2025, Bottoms said she had "actually supported the building of the public safety (training) center".

Her 2026 campaign platform calls for investment in flood mitigation and for water infrastructure able to keep up with growth. She also proposed a temporary statewide pause on new data center construction. At a press conference in Cobb County, she called for the state to "take a pause" and to "assess the impact that these data centers are having on our environment, on our utility bills". The campaign of her Republican opponent, Rick Jackson, said that Invest Atlanta had approved bond financing and a tax abatement for the Coda data center at Georgia Tech in 2018 and 2019, while she chaired its board. Her campaign said the approvals came years before the growth of artificial intelligence put new strain on the state's power grid.

== Electoral history ==
Atlanta City Council District 11 general election, 2009
Party	Candidate	Votes	%
Nonpartisan	Keisha Lance Bottoms	4,495	53.54
Nonpartisan	Reginald Eaves	1,009	12.02
Nonpartisan	Alvelyn Sanders	548	6.53
Nonpartisan	Johnny Dixon	492	5.86
Nonpartisan	Morris "Mo" Finley	465	5.54
Nonpartisan	Juanita M. Smith	464	5.53
Nonpartisan	Ray Abram	418	4.98
Nonpartisan	Silas G. Kevil	287	3.42
Nonpartisan	Edith Ladipo	211	2.51
Write-in		7	0.08
Total votes		8,396	100.00

Atlanta City Council District 11 general election, 2013
Party	Candidate	Votes	%
Nonpartisan	Keisha Lance Bottoms	4,963	88.96
Nonpartisan	Ron Shakir	610	10.93
Write-in		6	0.11
Total votes		5,579	100.00%

Atlanta mayoral election, 2017
Party	Candidate	Votes	%
Nonpartisan	Keisha Lance Bottoms	25,347	26.19%
Nonpartisan	Mary Norwood	20,144	20.81%
Nonpartisan	Cathy Woolard	16,134	16.67%
Nonpartisan	Peter Aman	10,924	11.29%
Nonpartisan	Vincent Fort	9,310	9.62%
Nonpartisan	Ceasar Mitchell	9,124	9.43%
Nonpartisan	Kwanza Hall	4,192	4.33%
Nonpartisan	John H. Eaves	1,202	1.24%
Nonpartisan	Rohit Ammanamanchi	196	0.20%
Nonpartisan	Michael T. Sterling (withdrew)	104	0.11%
Nonpartisan	Glenn S. Wrightson	100	0.10%
Nonpartisan	Laban King	0	0.00%
Write-in		7	0.01%
Total votes		96,777	100.00%

Atlanta mayoral runoff election results, 2017
Party	Candidate	Votes	%
Nonpartisan	Keisha Lance Bottoms	46,464	50.41%
Nonpartisan	Mary Norwood	45,705	49.59%
Total votes		92,169	100.00%

Georgia gubernatorial Democratic primary, 2026
Party	Candidate	Votes	%
Democratic	Keisha Lance Bottoms	608,264	56.2
Democratic	Jason Esteves	201,852	18.7
Democratic	Mike Thurmond	139,787	12.9
Democratic	Geoff Duncan	75,721	7.0
Democratic	Derrick Jackson	25,050	2.3
Democratic	Amanda Duffy	18,808	1.7
Democratic	Olujimi Brown	12,329	1.1
Total votes		1,081,811	100.0

== Publications ==
- Bottoms, Keisha Lance (2026). The Rough Side of the Mountain: A Memoir. New York: Mariner Books. ISBN 978-0-06-342008-3.

== See also ==
- Joe Biden Supreme Court candidates
- List of female governors in the United States
- List of mayors of the 50 largest cities in the United States

Political offices
Preceded by Kasim Reed	Mayor of Atlanta; 2018–2022	Succeeded by Andre Dickens
Preceded by Adrian Saenz; Acting	Director of the Office of Public Engagement; 2022–2023	Succeeded by Stephen K. Benjamin
Preceded by Brian Kemp	Governor of Georgia; Taking office 2027	Elect
Party political offices
Preceded by Stacey Abrams	Democratic nominee for Governor of Georgia; 2026	Most recent
