= Georgia International Law Enforcement Exchange =

The Georgia International Law Enforcement Exchange (GILEE) is a police training exchange program based at Georgia State University that was formed in 1992. The program primarily facilitates cooperation between Georgia law enforcement agencies and the Israeli Police, but also coordinates trainings between agencies from other countries and US states. The program's objectives are for Georgia law enforcement officials to receive training in drug interdiction and counter-terrorism while in Israel, and for Israeli officials to receive training in community policing.

About 1,250 law enforcement executives have participated in GILEE exchange programs as of 2023, and about 43,000 executives participated in GILEE led workshops and conferences.

== History ==
The program was created by criminology professor Dr. Robert Friedman as Atlanta was preparing to host the 1996 Olympic Games. Friedman had concerns about the possibility of a terror attack during the games, which the program and its collaboration with dozens of law enforcement agencies were not able to prevent.

The program later expanded into partnerships with several countries including Brazil, China, Egypt, and the United Kingdom. Collaboration with Israel was the original focus of the program and has remained the central priority. Several other US states also participate in the program, along with US cities including Ferguson, Philadelphia, and New York City.

In 2019, several civil rights groups, scholars, and faith-based organizations called on Atlanta Mayor Kesiha Lance-Bottoms to close the program. They said that the training provided by the program contributed to militarization of the police.

== Programming ==
The program's objectives are for Georgia law enforcement officials to receive training in drug interdiction and counter-terrorism in Israel, while Israeli officials receive training in community policing. Programming also includes border control, community and urban policing. Participants report that the exchange programs are an impactful and meaningful experience.

== Funding ==
The US Department of Justice subsidizes GILEE programs through grants to Georgia police departments. GILEE is also funded by private donations. Billionaire Bernard Marcus provided at least 1.25 million to the program between 2005 and 2022. The Atlanta Police Department funded at least $25,500/year for GILEE programs between 2017 and 2021.

== Controversy ==
GILEE has been subject to numerous controversies, including Islamophobia. GILEE's founding director, Robert Friedmann, has repeatedly used the program to heavily criticize Arabs and Muslims: • “…from within Islamic sources, and I’m talking about the leadership, varied as it is, there has not been (Friedmann, R. “Shifting Sands of Terrorism.” ICT. Sep. 10, 2015) a single unequivocal condemnation of September 11th.” • “Meanwhile self-styled Arab-American advocacy groups continue to support terror while focusing their efforts on mounting frivolous complaints about violations of their "rights." (Friedmann, Robert. "Wannsee, Oslo, Geneva." GILEE. Pg. 5. Dec. 7, 2003.) As of September 2026, activist efforts to shut down GILEE have been unsuccessful.
