= Treaty of Indian Springs =

Treaty of Indian Springs can refer to either of two treaties signed between the Muscogee and the United States in what is now Indian Springs State Park:

- Treaty of Indian Springs (1821)
- Treaty of Indian Springs (1825)
