= Killing of Tortuguita =

2023 death of an environmental activist in Georgia, United States

- Date: January 18, 2023
- Venue: Stop Cop City occupied protest
- Location: Stop Cop City encampment, South River Forest, Georgia, United States
- Type: Law enforcement killing
- Cause: Gunshot wounds
- Perpetrator: Georgia State Patrol
- Participants: Bryland Myers, Jerry Parrish, Jonathan Salcedo, Mark Jonathan Lamb, Ronaldo Kegel, Royce Zah
- Deaths: Manuel Esteban Paez Terán
- Injuries: Jerry Parrish
- Shooting is under investigation

Manuel Esteban Paez Terán, also known as Tortuguita, was a Venezuelan environmental activist and eco-anarchist. They (Note: Paez Terán identified as non-binary and used they/them pronouns.) were shot and killed by Georgia State Patrol troopers during a raid of the Stop Cop City forest encampment in Atlanta, Georgia on January 18, 2023. They were 26 years old. Following an investigation by the Georgia Bureau of Investigation, a special prosecutor appointed to the case declined to file charges against the involved officers, and a federal civil rights lawsuit filed by their family was dismissed.

Paez Terán's death resulted in widespread media attention, and sparked protests, vigils, and unrest throughout the Atlanta area. According to The Guardian, Paez Terán was the first environmental activist in modern U.S. history to have been shot and killed by police during a protest. Many organizations and some members of Congress have condemned the killing and called for an independent investigation of the events.

== Background ==
Manuel Esteban Paez Terán was a 26-year-old queer Indigenous environmental activist and eco-anarchist born in Venezuela. They were raised in Aruba, England, Russia, Egypt, Venezuela, Panama and the United States. Their family moved frequently due to their step-father's career in the oil industry.

Paez Terán began university at Florida State University-Panama in 2016. They later moved to Tallahassee, Florida in January 2020 to study at Florida State University. They completed their bachelor's degree in psychology and graduated with magna cum laude distinction. While living in Tallahassee, they were active in numerous community organizations. They participated in Food Not Bombs, the Tallahassee Community Action Committee, and the Industrial Workers of the World. They also aided in building housing in low income communities affected by a hurricane.

Paez Terán founded the Bond Community Mutual Aid group to support the historically Black Greater Bond neighborhood, and organized a winter shelter program in Railroad Village in Tallahassee. Paez Terán maintained connections with local political figures, including County Commissioner David O'Keefe and City Commissioners Jack Porter and Jeremy Matlow. They were present at the successful unionization of Tallahassee's Starbucks location, which was the first in Florida to unionize. In 2022, they took a 20-hour course in order to be a trained medic for activists. Paez Terán lived with Donna Cotterell, a board member of the local Indaba Theatre and Associates, for approximately one year until May 2022.

Paez Terán decided to join the Atlanta forest protests after learning about the Cop City project through a podcast.

The Stop Cop City protests that Paez Terán was participating in were taking place during a time of longstanding tensions about police violence in the United States, following the murder of George Floyd in 2020. Stop Cop City demonstrators opposed construction of the Atlanta Public Safety Training Center, which is slated to be built within a predominantly Black Atlanta neighborhood.

Paez Terán had expressed a commitment to nonviolence in a 2022 interview with The Bitter Southerner. They coordinated mutual aid for the Stop Cop City movement and went by the nickname "Tortuguita", which is Spanish for "Little Turtle".

== Fatal shooting ==
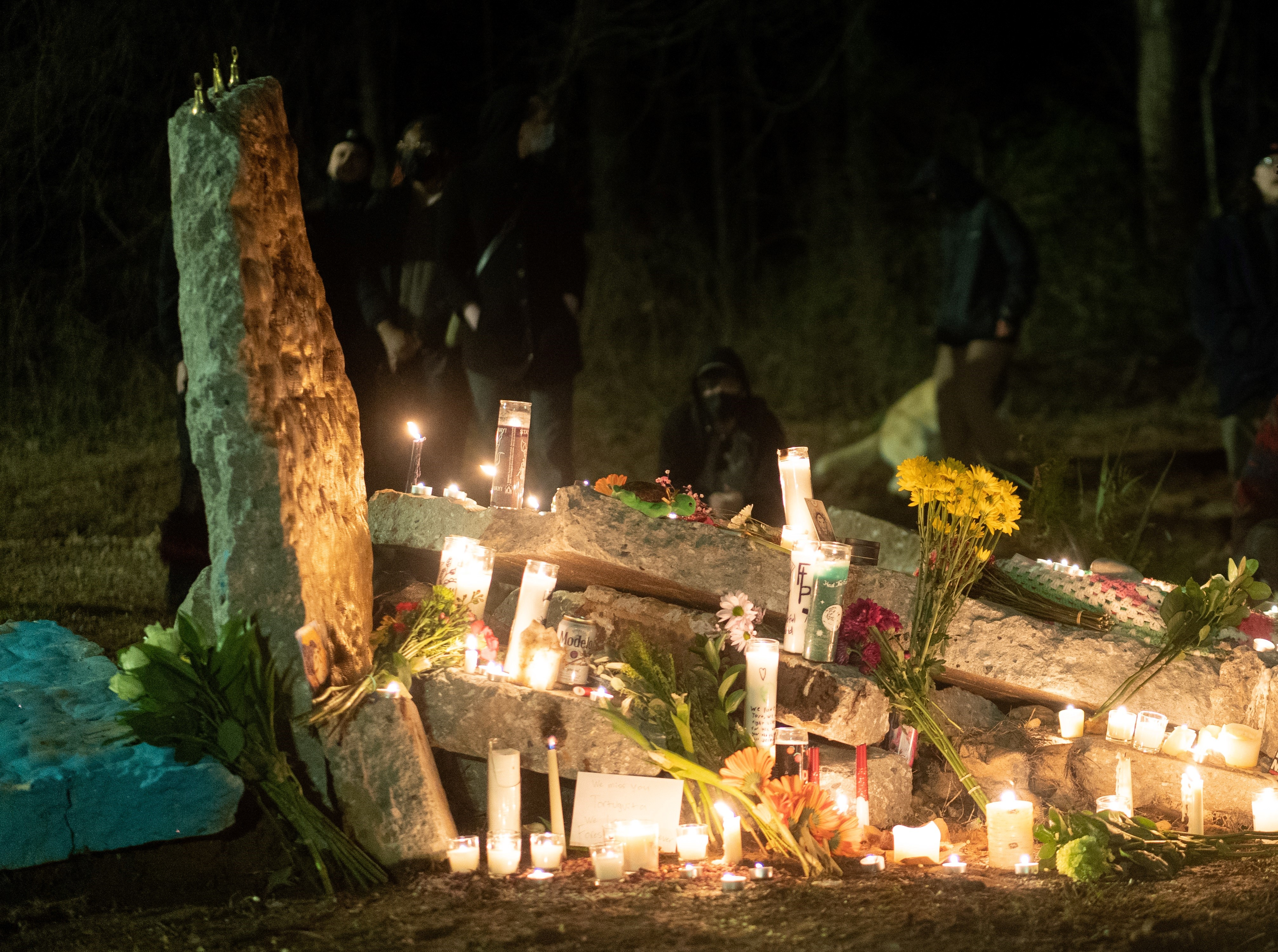
A memorial in the Atlanta forest commemorating Tortuguita

On the morning of January 18, 2023, Paez Terán was above a tree at the Stop Cop City encampment. At around 9:00 a.m. that morning, Georgia State Patrol troopers commenced a raid, also known as a Clearing Operation, on the encampment with the intent of removing and clearing illegal encampments.

According to the special prosecutor's report, the troopers commanded Tortuguita to come down the tree. When they did not comply, the troopers shot a pepper-spray projectile. The GBI report states that Tortuguita returned four shots from a Smith & Wesson M&P Shield 9-millimeter handgun, striking a trooper. Six troopers then fired on and killed Paez Terán.

On February 9, 2023, the Atlanta police released body camera footage of the aftermath of the shooting wherein an officer is heard saying "You fucked your own officer up." This led some to believe that the injured officer had not been shot by Paez Terán, but by friendly fire from another officer.

A GBI report published October 2023 claims that after the shooting ceased, a loud "boom" sounded with white smoke coming out of Paez Terán's tent. GBI troopers believed this was an improvised explosive device deployed by Paez Terán. The report was released in conjunction with the announcement that no charges would be filed against the involved troopers.

Officers say that a trooper, Jerry Parrish, suffered serious injuries and was struck multiple times – including below his armor plate and above his belt on his right side. According to the trooper's account, one of the bullets lodged in his spine. He was transported to Grady Hospital by ambulance where he underwent surgery to remove the bullet.

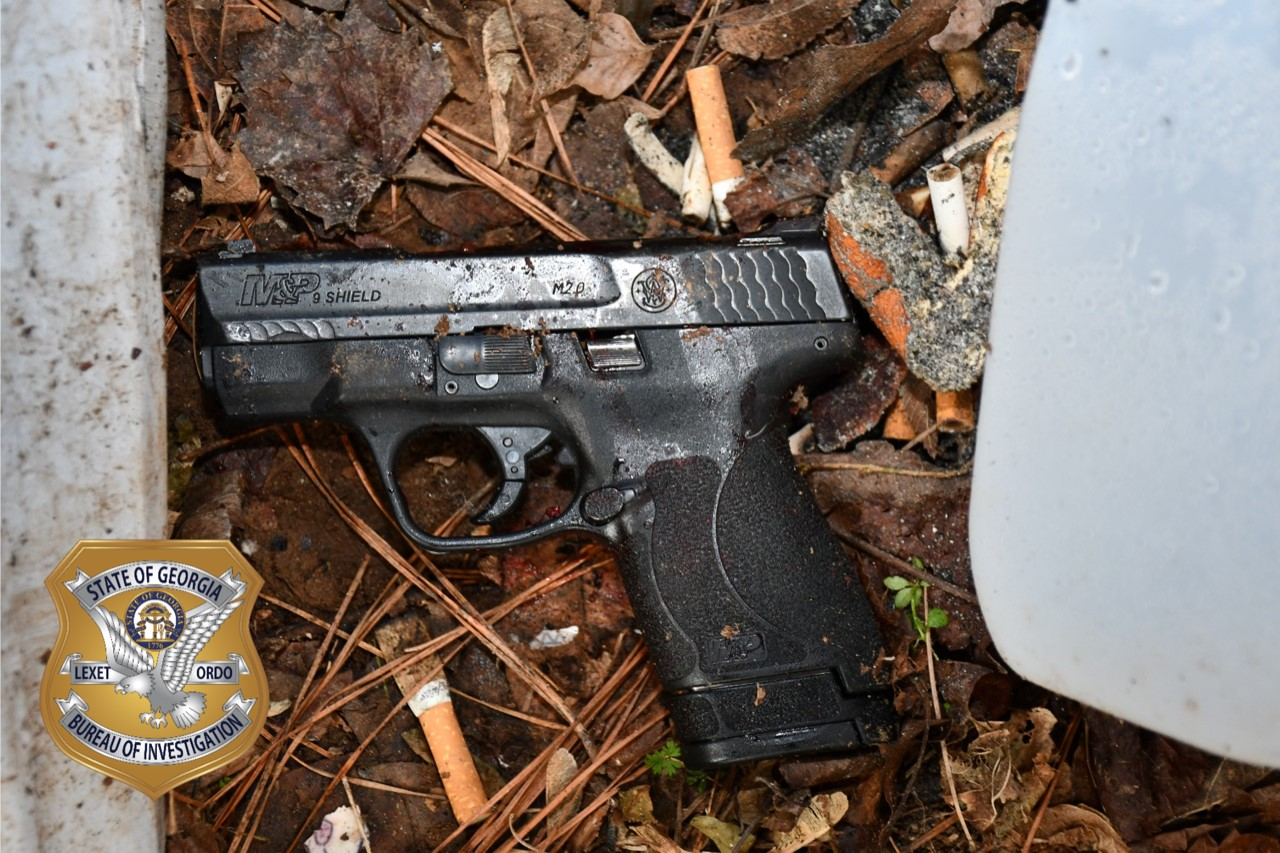
Handgun owned by Manuel Paez Terán and recovered by GBI during investigation.

== Investigations ==
Police accounts of the incident claim that troopers encountered a tent and gave verbal orders for the person up the tree to come down. Police say their commands were ignored. They claim that Paez Terán fired first, without warning. Stop Cop City activists dispute the police description of the event. Paez Terán's family and some protesters dispute that Paez Terán fired a gun at the officers.

The shooting was initially under investigation by both the GBI and Dekalb County District Attorney's Office. District Attorney Sherry Boston requested an independent prosecuting agency to take over the investigation to avoid the appearance of a conflict of interest, as her office has involvement in a task force for the Atlanta Public Training Facility. George Christian, the district attorney for northeast Georgia's Mountain Judicial Circuit, became the case's special prosecutor in April 2023.

According to the GBI, forensic ballistic analysis determined that the projectile recovered from the officer's leg wound matched the handgun found in Paez Terán's possession. The details of this analysis have not been released publicly. The recovered handgun, a Smith & Wesson M&P Shield 9mm semi-automatic pistol with serial number JFE8099, was determined to have been purchased legally alledgedly by Paez Terán in September 2020. Four 9mm cartridge cases were recovered by a GBI agent inside the tent occupied by Paez Terán. They were believed to have been fired from the recovered Smith & Wesson handgun registered to Paez Terán.

Police claim that Paez Terán refused to come down the tree and subsequently shot and wounded an officer with that gun, something the activists deny. Testing of gunshot primer residue (GSR) revealed allegedly the presence of particulates characteristics of gunshot primer residue on Paez Terán. An Autopsy was performed by the Dekalb County Medical Examiner on January 19, 2023, and in that examination gunpowder residue was not seen on their hands.

According to the GBI, there is no bodycam footage of the shooting itself. On February 9, 2023, Atlanta police released body camera footage of the aftermath of the shooting wherein an officer is heard saying,

"(inaudible), you fucked your own officer up,"

— 9:04:20, 2023-01-18

Two officers are later heard asking "Did they shoot their own man?" In the footage, officers were also heard saying that the gunfire "sounded like suppressed gunfire." This comment led some to believe that the officer had been injured by friendly fire rather than by Paez Terán.

Results from an independent autopsy determined that Paez Téran had been shot at least 14 (corrected later to 57 times) "by different firearms" while sitting cross-legged on the ground. This was indicated by, among other factors, the downward trajectory of fire of bullets from above and the pattern of injuries on their legs. The autopsy also says that "... none of the identified firearm wounds exhibited any evidence of close range firing" because traces of gunpowder were not found, but that "... for the purposes of this report, the range of fire for all of these wounds is considered to be 'indeterminate.'"

According to the independent autopsy report, "[at] some point during the course of being shot, the decedent was able to raise [their] hands and arms up and in front of [their] body, with [their] palms facing towards [their] upper body." Exit wounds were found on the palms of both hands, and Paez Terán's upper body was struck by multiple bullets. Many journalists and activists questioned whether Paez Terán's hands could have been raised at the time of the shooting. The independent autopsy concluded by noting that it was "impossible to determine if the decedent had been holding a firearm, or not holding a firearm, either before [they were] shot or while [they were] being shot the multiple times."

On April 19, 2023, the DeKalb County Medical Examiner released their autopsy report and ruled Paez Terán's manner of death to be homicide. The autopsy found that contrary to police statements and reports, Paez Terán did not have gunshot powder on their hands or clothes. It also recorded that Paez Terán had received a total of 57 gunshot wounds. The findings of the county autopsy also suggest that the police who opened fire on Paez Terán were likely to have been more than several feet away when officers' weapons were discharged.

On October 6, 2023, the Stone Mountain Circuit District Attorney's Office, which was assigned as a special prosecutor for the case, announced that they will not charge the six Georgia State Patrol Officers involved in the fatal shooting of Terán, stating that the troopers' use of force was "objectively reasonable under the circumstances of the case." Only selective records have been released to the public, apart from nearby police bodycam footage. The office has said that open records requests related to the case would not be fulfilled until the Cop City related prosecutions have finished. The prosecutions, which include dozens of people, could last multiple years.

In December 2024, the family of Paez Terán filed a federal civil rights lawsuit against three police officers involved in the killing. The family disputes the official account that Paez Terán fired gunshots first, and allege excessive force and unlawful targeting of protesters. In 2026, judge Steven Grimberg of the Northern District of Georgia dismissed the lawsuit.

== Reactions to the killing ==
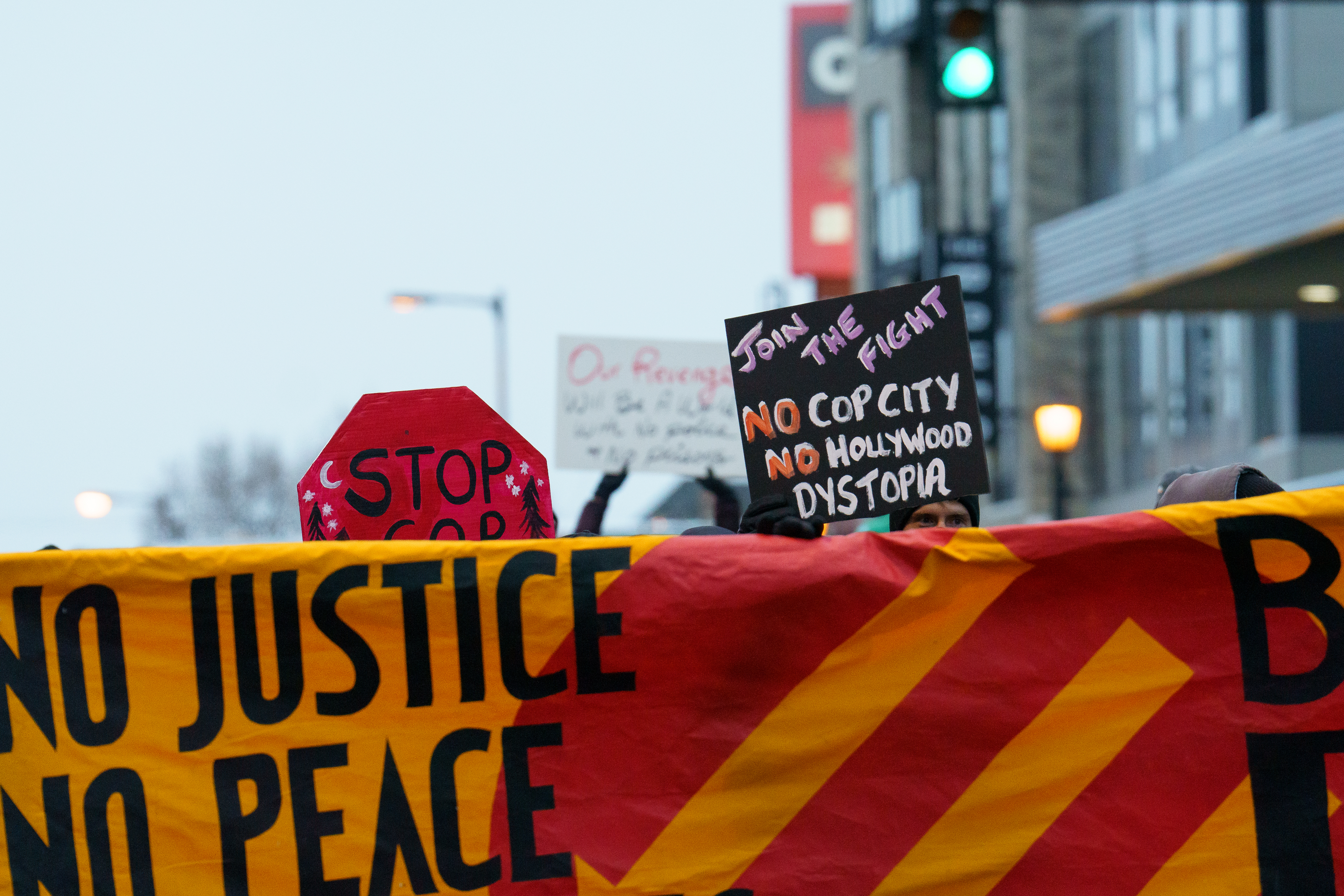
Protest in Minneapolis on January 21, 2023.

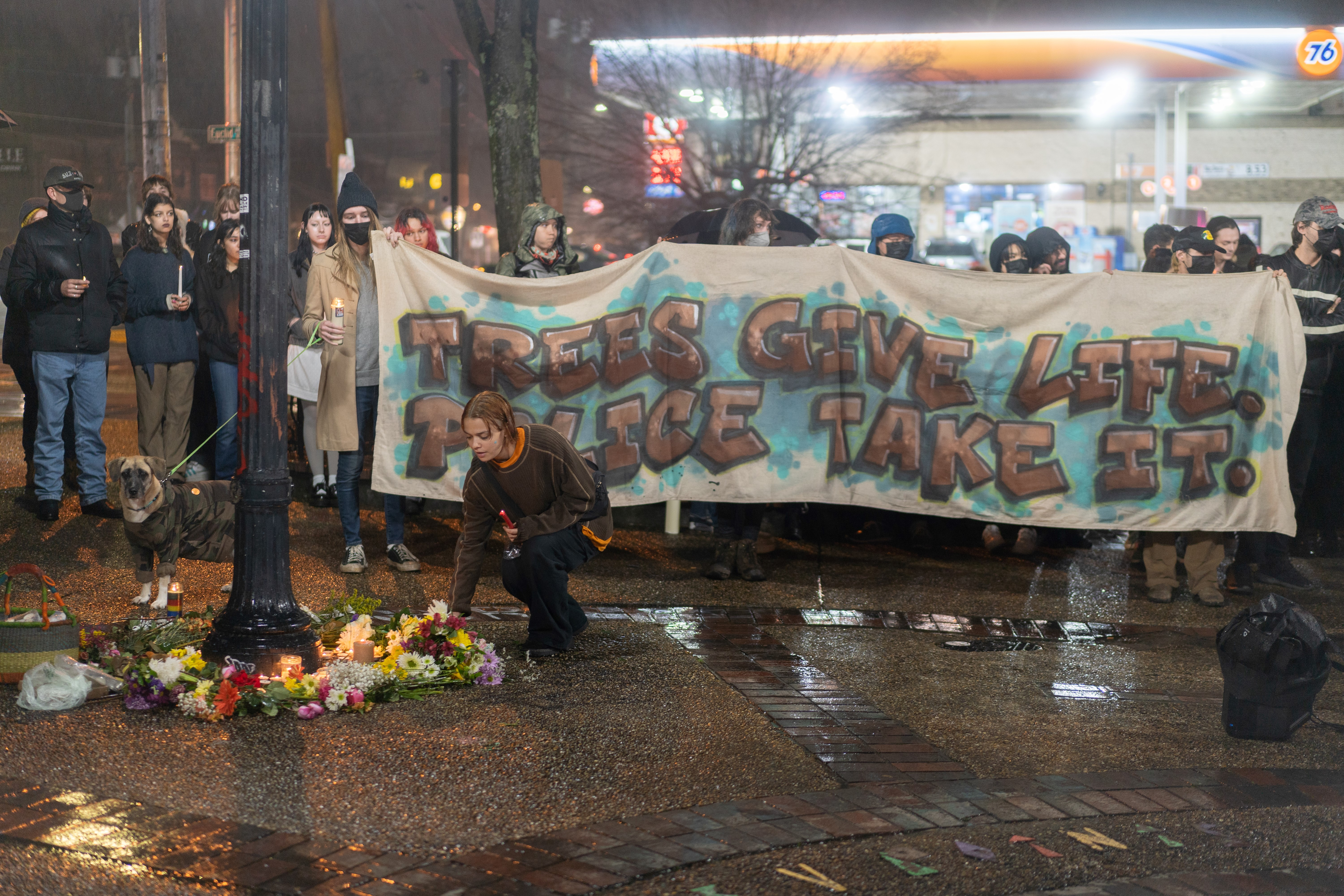
A shrine in the streets of Atlanta commemorating the killing of Tortuguita (January 19, 2023)

Notable vigils and protests were held in the U.S. cities of Atlanta, Bridgeport, Minneapolis, Nashville, Philadelphia, and Tucson from January 20–22, 2023. Some demonstrators spray painted graffiti on Bank of America buildings to protest the company's involvement in financing the facility's construction. Vigils were also held in the U.S. cities of Seattle and Chicago, and internationally in London and Lützerath.

=== Atlanta vigil and riot ===
On January 21, 2023, there was a vigil for Tortuguita. A group of about 40 adults and children placed candles and homemade signs by the turtle in Clark Park, Atlanta. Later in the day, protests briefly turned violent in Atlanta. Demonstrators had marched from Underground Atlanta down Peachtree Street. At the intersection with Ellis Street, some demonstrators threw objects, set at least two Atlanta Police Department vehicles on fire, and smashed windows of bank buildings with hammers. Six people were arrested and charged criminally for actions during the January 21 riot. Police alleged that several of the persons arrested possessed explosives.

Stop Cop City issued a statement the day after the riot stating, "Destruction of material is fundamentally different from violence. All reported acts appear to be explicitly targeted against the financial backers". On January 26, 2023, Georgia governor Brian Kemp declared a state of emergency in response to unrest that had erupted following the killing.

=== Political change and impact ===
In the aftermath of the fatal shooting, the Georgia General Assembly considered legislation to require state patrol officers to wear body cameras.

In February, U.S. Representatives Cori Bush, Rashida Tlaib, and Senator Ed Markey called for an independent investigation into the killing. Several hundred national and international organizations have condemned the killing and called for an independent investigation.

According to The Guardian, Paez Terán was the first environmental activist in modern U.S. history to have been shot and killed by police during a protest. Demonstrations and vigils were held in several cities in the United States and internationally in reaction to the killing, including a riot in Atlanta on January 21, 2023.

== See also ==
- 2020–2023 United States racial unrest
- Intrenchment Creek Park
- Lists of killings by law enforcement officers in the United States
