= Cop City =

Police training facility in Georgia, US

Atlanta Public Safety Training Center
- Architect's drawing of the training campus
- Alternative names: Cop City

General information
- Status: Completed
- Location: South River Forest, DeKalb County, Georgia, U.S.
- Coordinates: 33°41′38″N 84°20′10″W
- Cost: $118 million
- Owner: Atlanta Police Foundation (majority investor)
- Landlord: City of Atlanta

Technical details
- Grounds: 85 acres (34 ha)

Design and construction
- Engineer: Terracon

Website
- www.atltrainingcenter.com

The Atlanta Public Safety Training Center (APSTC), commonly known as Cop City, is a police and fire department training campus in the South River Forest located in Southwest DeKalb County near Atlanta, Georgia, United States. Much of the land included in the plans was formerly part of the Old Atlanta Prison Farm, which was abandoned in 1995. The facility opened on April 29, 2025.

The project was proposed by the City of Atlanta in 2021, and met a multi-faceted movement opposing the construction of the training center. In January 2023, Manuel Esteban Paez Terán, an environmental activist and member of the Stop Cop City movement, was fatally shot by Atlanta police after allegedly firing a weapon at officers attempting to evict them from an encampment, drawing national and international attention and escalating conflict around the project.

Stop Cop City protestors arrested in late 2022 and early 2023 were charged with domestic terrorism; the appropriateness of these charges has been criticized by civil liberties advocates. In September 2023, sixty-one people were indicted with racketeering under the state's RICO law, in what is likely the largest criminal conspiracy case ever filed against protestors in the US. In September 2025, Fulton County Superior Court Judge Kevin Farmer dismissed the RICO charges.

== Description ==
The facility occupies 85 acres (34 ha) owned by the City of Atlanta in the South River Forest, DeKalb County, Georgia. The city promised the development would also include 265 acres (107 ha) of green-space, though fact-checkers have found that the size of the promised green space was "oversold by at least 40%."

Construction of the center began in spring 2023. The $118 million cost of the facility was shared by the Atlanta Police Foundation and the City of Atlanta, with the city paying $67 million for the project, though the originally promised taxpayer cost was $30 million.

The center opened in April 2025 for use as a training campus for police and fire services. Facilities include classrooms, a burn building, a mock city (including apartments, a bar/nightclub, and a school), and a shooting range.

== Background ==
Following Black Lives Matter protests in the US in 2014, funding for police training at all levels of government skyrocketed, and some cities proposed additional police training facilities. A similar facility was approved in New York City in 2015 following the police killing of Eric Garner, and also in Chicago following a string of police killings in that city between 2014 and 2016.

=== Land use history ===
The Muscogee peoples lived in the area of the South River Forest until the 1830s, when the United States federal government forcibly removed most of the community to Indian Territory (now Oklahoma) during the Trail of Tears. A possible name for the creek running through the land in the Muscogee language was "Weelaunee," translatable as "brown water [place]." The Muscogee people harvested from the forest for their needs, including acorn flour for food and hickory wood for toolmaking.

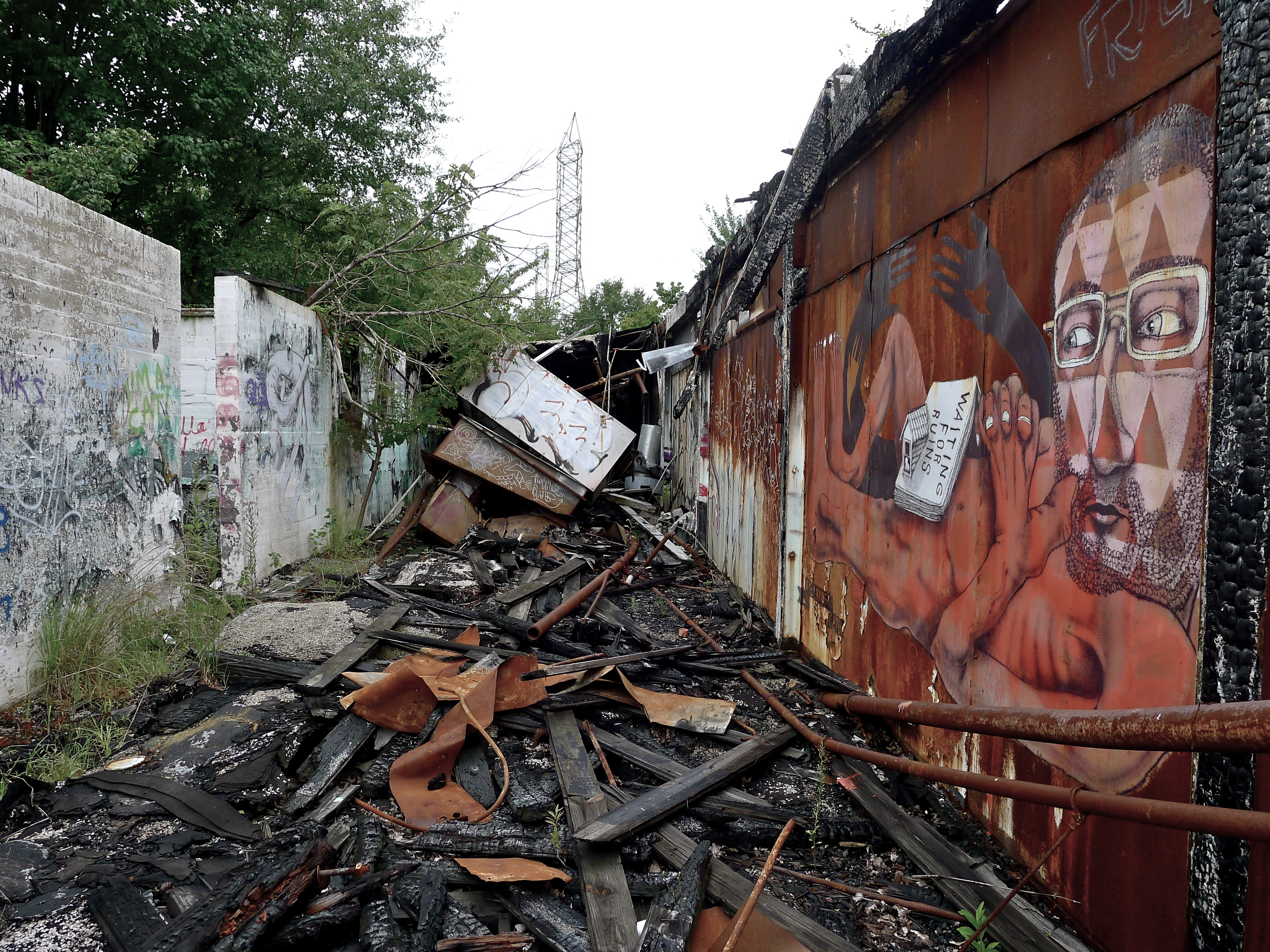
Abandoned building on the site, 2013

The land was used for a slave plantation from 1827 through the Civil War. In 1911, the city of Atlanta purchased the property from the descendants of the original plantation owners to run a city dairy farm. In 1922 it became the city prison farm, where prisoners serving sentences for misdemeanors like "public inebriation" raised crops, pigs, and cows for the prison and hospital system. The farming operations were gradually phased out over several decades, and the prison closed in the 1990s.

After it was abandoned, the land was used to illegally dump tires, and was damaged by serious fires in 2009 and 2017.

In 2023, the site consisted of mixed hardwood and softwood forest.

== Development history ==
In April 2021, Atlanta Mayor Keisha Lance Bottoms proposed the project with a budget of $90 million. The project was approved by the city council in September of that year in spite of lengthy public comment opposing the project.

Since 2021, numerous public gatherings, protests, and community events including skill shares, guided hikes, and musical performances were held at the site.

Pre-construction clearing of the site began in May 2022. A key event in the conflict around the development occurred in December 2022, when five protesters were arrested and charged with domestic terrorism—the first time domestic terrorism charges were filed against environmental activists in the U.S.

=== Killing of Tortuguita ===
On January 18, 2023, 26-year-old protester Manuel Esteban Paez Terán, also known as Tortuguita, was fatally shot by Georgia State Patrol troopers during an operation to clear an encampment of opponents of the training center. Authorities said Paez Terán had fired at the troopers, wounding one; their family initially disputed that account. In March 2023, lawyers representing the family said an independent autopsy indicated that Paez Terán had probably been sitting cross-legged with their hands raised when shot.

The killing drew national and international attention to the project and contributed to the expansion of the opposition movement. Following a January 21 vigil, some demonstrators damaged buildings and police vehicles in downtown Atlanta. Governor Brian Kemp subsequently declared a state of emergency and authorized the deployment of National Guard troops.

In March 2026, U.S. District Judge Steven Grimberg dismissed a civil rights lawsuit brought by Paez Terán's parents. Grimberg noted that the plaintiffs acknowledged Paez Terán had fired at the troopers, wounding one, and ruled that the troopers' subsequent use of deadly force was objectively reasonable. He also upheld their earlier use of pepper balls and ruled that the officers were entitled to qualified immunity.

=== March 2023 attack and domestic terrorism arrests ===
On March 5, 2023, protesters destroyed construction vehicles at the site with Molotov cocktails, fireworks, large rocks, and bricks. A few police officers were in the vicinity during the demonstration, but no injuries to police were reported. Hours later, police raided a music festival being held about 0.75 miles (1.21 km) away and detained 35 people, alleging that vandals had hidden in the crowd. Twenty-three people were arrested and charged with domestic terrorism, although arrest warrants did not present evidence of violence or property damage. Of those arrested, only two were from the state of Georgia. Only one person arrested was offered bond: a Southern Poverty Law Center lawyer who was present as an observer.

By May, prosecutors had charged more than 40 protesters with domestic terrorism, a move that Human Rights Watch called an "attempt to smear protesters as national security threats".

=== Atlanta Solidarity Fund raid ===
On May 31, a SWAT team arrested three organizers of the Atlanta Solidary Fund, a bail fund that had supported protesters with bail and legal defense. Those arrested were charged with money laundering and charity fraud. That same month, developers finished clearing the site of all existing vegetation and debris in preparation for construction.

=== Referendum ===
On June 6, 2023, the Atlanta City Council approved $31 million in funding after more than 16 hours of in-person public comment from over 300 speakers, the vast majority of whom were opposed to the project. More than 1,000 people signed up to speak, but hundreds of people were not admitted to the building. A minority of speakers supported the project, stating that opponents do not represent the people of Atlanta.

In June 2023, a coalition of activist groups opposed to the construction project announced their plans to force a referendum that would cancel the city’s lease to the APF for Cop City. The Georgia constitution allows residents to force a referendum on decisions by local governments if they can get 15% of registered voters to sign petition; in Atlanta, 60,000 to 70,000 signatures would be required. The city said cancellation of the lease would not be legal.

In September 2023, organizers submitted 116,000 signatures for the referendum, but the City Council refused to count them, and said the activists had missed the deadline to turn in the signatures. That deadline had been extended by US District Judge Mark Cohen, but the city's appeal of that decision got held up for over a year in the 11th Circuit Court of Appeals, and had not resolved as of April 2025.

=== RICO conspiracy indictment ===
In September 2023, sixty-one people who had been arrested in the forest or at Stop Cop City protests were charged with racketeering under Georgia’s RICO law. This indictment is likely the largest criminal conspiracy case ever filed against protestors in the US.

As of April 2025, the racketeering case was stalled. Defendants in the case maintained their innocence and reported difficulty getting work and other hardships while they awaited trial for more than 20 months. In September, all RICO charges were dropped. Judge Kevin Farmer found that the Georgia Attorney General did not have the authority to bring RICO charges in the case.

=== Opening ===
In April 2025, city and state officials celebrated the grand opening of the Atlanta Public Safety Training Center. For the first time, this center will facilitate local police officers and firefighters training together.

== See also ==
- Crime in Atlanta
