= Atlanta Police Foundation =

American not-for-profit organization

- Formation: 2003
- Type: Nonprofit
- Purpose: Supporting Atlanta Police Department
- Headquarters: Atlanta, Georgia, United States
- CEO: Dave Wilkinson
- Revenue: $28.1 million (2021)
- Website: atlantapolicefoundation.org

The Atlanta Police Foundation is an American nonprofit organization that provides support to the Atlanta Police Department.

It is the majority funder of emergency services training center Cop City.

== Organization ==
The Atlanta Police Foundation was founded in 2003 to fund police activity that is not funded by government. It is located at 191 Peachtree Street NW, Atlanta, Georgia.

Unlike police forces, which are accountable to the public, Atlanta Police Foundation is accountable solely to its own board of directors. In January 2023, directors included leaders of American companies Delta Air Lines, Waffle House, The Home Depot, Georgia-Pacific, Equifax, real estate company Carter, Accenture, Wells Fargo and United Parcel Service. Rob Baskin is the vice president and director of public affairs. United States Secret Service veteran Dave Wilkinson is the chief executive officer and president.

The organization generated $28.1 million in 2021, a fifteen-fold increase from its 2011 revenue and the highest revenue of all the 150 similar police foundations, double that of Las Vegas Police Foundation. Revenue is often generated from corporate donations, including from Roark Capital, Silver Lake Management, and restaurant company Inspire Brands. Expenditure includes spending on security cameras and paying for the majority of the $90 million Atlanta Public Safety Training Center.

== See also ==
- Stop Cop City
