= List of environmental killings =

Environmental killings are murders, assassinations, or other unlawful killings which are linked to environmental issues such as illegal logging, mining, land grabbing, pollution etc. Victims have included not only environmental and land rights activists, but also members of indigenous communities and journalists who have reported on these issues.

== Statements ==
In 2003, the Environmental Justice Foundation reported that in at least 11 countries people had been murdered for opposing shrimp farming and its associated environmental impacts.

According to Global Witness, the number of environmental killings worldwide reached 147 in 2012, and the total number of such murders between 2002 and 2013 exceeds 908. In only six of these cases were the killers tried, convicted and punished. The report blames this level of impunity, together with the lack of attention to the issue, for the rise in the numbers of deaths.

In March 2014, when the United Nations Independent Expert on human rights and the environment, John Knox, presented his first detailed report to the UN Human Rights Council on the human rights obligations relating to environmental protection he stated: “Environmental human rights defenders deserve no less protection than other human rights defenders.”

== List of killings ==
Following is a list of the victims of environmental killings by date:

=== 20th century ===
| Date | Activist name | Country | Cause |
|---|---|---|---|
| July 8, 1905 | Guy Bradley | United States | Birds protection |
| November 3, 1942 | Ernest Gibbins | Uganda | Entomologist killed by tribesmen |
| July 31, 1977 | Vital Michalon | France | killed by police in a demonstration against the fast breeder nuclear reactor at Malville |
| June 3, 1979 | Gladys del Estal | Spain | Anti-nuclear ecologist activist killed by a Civil Guardsman during a demonstration against a nuclear power plant and an aircraft firing range. |
| July 21, 1980 | Wilson Pinheiro | Brazil | Preservation of the Amazon rainforest |
| May 13, 1985 | John Africa, Rhonda Africa, Theresa Africa, Frank Africa, Conrad Africa, Tree Africa, Delisha Africa, Netta Africa, Little Phil Africa, Tomaso Africa, and Raymond Africa | Philadelphia, Pennsylvania, United States | Police bombing of MOVE (racial and environmental justice) organization headquarters |
| July 10, 1985 | Fernando Pereira | New Zealand | Protest against nuclear testing |
| c. December 26, 1985 | Dian Fossey | Rwanda | Mountain gorilla conservationist |
| April 6, 1987 | Vicente Cañas | Brazil | Protection of Enawene Nawe people land |
| December 22, 1988 | Chico Mendes | Brazil | Preservation of the Amazon rainforest |
| August 20, 1989 | George Adamson | Kenya | Conservationist most recognized for his work on lions |
| 1 September 1990 | Seub Nakhasathien | Thailand | Suicide to signify the importance of the environment |
| February 6, 1995 | Jeannette Kawas | Honduras | Protests again palm plantations and dams |
| November 10, 1995 | Ken Saro-Wiwa | Nigeria | nonviolent campaign against environmental degradation caused by crude oil extraction |

=== 21st century ===
In the 21st century, more than 1000 environmental activists have been killed. Every year, more than 100 environmental activists are murdered throughout the world. 116 environmental activists were assassinated in 2014. More than two environmentalists were assassinated every week in 2014 and three every week in 2015. 185 environmental activists were assassinated in 2015. More than 200 environmental activists were assassinated worldwide between 2016 and 2018. In 2019 and 2020 the number was 212 and 227 respectively.

| Date | Activist name | Country | Cause |
|---|---|---|---|
| September 17, 2003 | Jane Tipson | Saint Lucia | Conservationist and animal rights activism. |
| 12 February 2005 | Dorothy Stang | Brazil | Preservation of the Amazon rainforest |
| 13 January 2006 | Joan Root | Kenya | Anti-poaching task force |
| 2010 | Leonard Co | Philippines | Botanist and plant taxonomist shot by the military during a biodiversity project in a forest. |
| January 24, 2011 | Gerry Ortega | Philippines | Crocodile farming, anti-corruption, sustainable ecotourism, and anti-mining advocate. |
| May 24, 2011 | José Cláudio Ribeiro da Silva | Brazil | Preservation of the Amazon rainforest |
| 16 August 2011 | Shehla Masood | India | RTI and environmental activism |
| 26 April 2012 | Chut Wutty | Cambodia | Critic of the military's alleged role in illegal logging |
| 11 September 2012 | Hang Serei Odom | Cambodia | Reports about illegal logging industry |
| 13 March 2013 | Perween Rahman | Pakistan | Reports about illegal logging industry |
| May 31, 2013 | Jairo Mora Sandoval | Costa Rica | Protection of leatherback turtle nests |
| April 9, 2015 | Gregory "Gibby" Leonard Gibbard | Zimbabwe | Protection of African painted dogs |
| 25 August 2015 | Raimundo Santos Rodrigues (and his wife) | Brazil | Environmental rights defender. |
| Between 6 and 9 November 2015 | Lkhagvasumberel Tumursukh | Mongolia | Snow leopard conservationist |
| 13 October 2016 | Luiz Alberto Araújo | Brazil | Secretary for the environment on Altamira city council |
| 3 March 2016 | Berta Cáceres | Honduras | Protests against the construction of Agua Zarca Dam. |
| 16 August 2017 | Wayne Lotter | Tanzania | Wildlife conservationist |
| 4 February 2018 | Esmond Bradley Martin | Kenya | Elephants and ivory trade |
| 2 November 2019 | Paulo Paolino Guajajara | Brazil | Amazon Protector |
| January 2020 | Homero Gómez González | Mexico | Environmental activist, agricultural engineer, and politician. El Rosario Monarch Butterfly Preserve |
| October 2020 | Fikile Ntshangase | South Africa | Environmental activist involved in a legal dispute over the extension of an opencast mine operated by Tendele Coal near Hluhluwe–Imfolozi Park, the oldest nature reserve in Africa. |
| 26 July 2022 | Anton Mzimba | South Africa | Timbavati Private Nature Reserve ranger |
| 18 January 2023 | Manuel Esteban Paez Terán | United States | Environmental activist involved in Stop Cop City social movement to prevent construction of the Cop City by the Atlanta Police Foundation and the City of Atlanta. |
| 29 September 2023 | Quinto Inuma Alvarado | Peru | Tribal leader who opposed illegal logging in his community |

== See also ==
- Anti-environmentalism
- Green criminology
- Environmental activist killings in Honduras
- Environmental crime
- Environmental issues in Thailand § Murder of environmental activists
- Environmentalism
- Environmental activist
- Environmental degradation
- Goldman Environmental Prize
- Illegal logging
- Pollution
