= 47th Primetime Emmy Awards =

1995 American television programming awards

- Promotional poster
- Date: September 10, 1995 (Ceremony); September 9, 1995 (Creative Arts Awards)
- Location: Pasadena Civic Auditorium, Pasadena, California
- Presented by: Academy of Television Arts and Sciences
- Hosted by: Jason Alexander; Cybill Shepherd

Highlights
- Most awards: Frasier (5)
- Most nominations: ER (11)
- Outstanding Comedy Series: Frasier
- Outstanding Drama Series: NYPD Blue
- Outstanding Miniseries: Joseph
- Outstanding Variety Series: The Tonight Show with Jay Leno

Television/radio coverage
- Network: Fox

The 47th Primetime Emmy Awards were held on Sunday, September 10, 1995. The ceremony was hosted by Jason Alexander and Cybill Shepherd. It was broadcast on Fox and presented 27 awards.

Frasier won its second consecutive Primetime Emmy Award for Outstanding Comedy Series and led all shows with five major wins. For the second straight year, a freshman drama series came into the ceremony with a bevy of major nominations, but failed to win for Outstanding Drama Series. ER led all shows with 11 major nominations and won three major awards, but lost the top prize to NYPD Blue, which was in a similar situation to ER the previous year.

Candice Bergen's win for the seventh season of Murphy Brown made her the third performer to win five Emmys for playing the same character. She declined to be submitted for any future seasons of the show.

Marvin Hamlisch's win made him the sixth person to become an EGOT.

== Winners and nominees ==
=== Programs ===
Outstanding Comedy Series: Frasier (NBC); Friends (NBC); The Larry Sanders Show (HBO); Mad About You (NBC); Seinfeld (NBC)	Outstanding Drama Series: NYPD Blue (ABC); Chicago Hope (CBS); ER (NBC); Law & Order (NBC); The X-Files (Fox)
Outstanding Variety, Music or Comedy Series: The Tonight Show with Jay Leno (NBC); Dennis Miller Live (HBO); Late Show with David Letterman (CBS); MTV Unplugged (MTV); Politically Incorrect with Bill Maher (Comedy Central)	Outstanding Variety, Music or Comedy Special: Barbra Streisand: The Concert (HBO); The 67th Annual Academy Awards (ABC); AFI Life Achievement Award: A Tribute to Steven Spielberg (NBC); A Comedy Salute to Andy Kaufman (NBC); Eagles: Hell Freezes Over (MTV)
Outstanding Made for Television Movie: Indictment: The McMartin Trial (HBO); The Burning Season (HBO); Citizen X (HBO); The Piano Lesson (CBS); Serving in Silence: The Margarethe Cammermeyer Story (NBC)	Outstanding Miniseries: Joseph (TNT); Buffalo Girls (CBS); Children of the Dust (CBS); Martin Chuzzlewit (PBS); A Woman of Independent Means (NBC)

=== Acting ===
==== Lead performances ====
Outstanding Lead Actor in a Comedy Series: Kelsey Grammer as Dr. Frasier Crane in Frasier (NBC) (Episode: "Adventures in Paradise", Part 2); John Goodman as Dan Conner in Roseanne (ABC) (Episode: "The Blaming of the Shrew"); Paul Reiser as Paul Buchman in Mad About You (NBC) (Episode: "Cake Fear"); Jerry Seinfeld as Jerry Seinfeld in Seinfeld (NBC) (Episode: "The Diplomat's Club"); Garry Shandling as Larry Sanders in The Larry Sanders Show (HBO) (Episode: "The Mr. Sharon Stone Show")	Outstanding Lead Actress in a Comedy Series: Candice Bergen as Murphy Brown in Murphy Brown (CBS) (Episode: "Requiem for a Crew Guy"); Roseanne Barr as Roseanne Conner in Roseanne (ABC) (Episode: "Thanksgiving 1994"); Ellen DeGeneres as Ellen Morgan in Ellen (ABC) (Episode: "The Spa"); Helen Hunt as Jamie Buchman in Mad About You (NBC) (Episode: "The Ride Home"); Cybill Shepherd as Cybill Sheridan in Cybill (CBS) (Episode: "Virgin, Mother, Crone")
Outstanding Lead Actor in a Drama Series: Mandy Patinkin as Dr. Jeffrey Geiger in Chicago Hope (CBS) (Episode: "Over the Rainbow"); George Clooney as Dr. Doug Ross in ER (NBC) (Episode: "Long Day's Journey"); Anthony Edwards as Dr. Mark Greene in ER (NBC) (Episode: "Love's Labor Lost"); Dennis Franz as Andy Sipowicz in NYPD Blue (ABC) (Episode: "A.D.A. Sipowicz"); Jimmy Smits as Bobby Simone in NYPD Blue (ABC) (Episode: "The Bookie and Kooky Cookie")	Outstanding Lead Actress in a Drama Series: Kathy Baker as Jill Brock in Picket Fences (CBS) (Episode: "Frogman Returns"); Claire Danes as Angela Chase in My So-Called Life (ABC) (Episode: "Pilot"); Angela Lansbury as Jessica Fletcher in Murder, She Wrote (CBS) (Episode: "Dear Deadly"); Sherry Stringfield as Dr. Susan Lewis in ER (NBC) (Episode: "Motherhood"); Cicely Tyson as Carrie Grace Battle in Sweet Justice (NBC) (Episode: "In the Name of the Sun")
Outstanding Lead Actor in a Miniseries or a Special: Raul Julia as Chico Mendes in The Burning Season (HBO); Charles S. Dutton as Boy Willie Charles in The Piano Lesson (CBS); John Goodman as Huey P. Long in Kingfish: A Story of Huey P. Long (TNT); John Lithgow as Tom Bradley and Bob Bradley in My Brother's Keeper (CBS); James Woods as Danny Davis in Indictment: The McMartin Trial (HBO)	Outstanding Lead Actress in a Miniseries or a Special: Glenn Close as Margarethe Cammermeyer in Serving in Silence: The Margarethe Cammermeyer Story (NBC); Sally Field as Bess Gardner Steed in A Woman of Independent Means (NBC); Anjelica Huston as Calamity Jane in Buffalo Girls (CBS); Diane Keaton as Amelia Earhart in Amelia Earhart: The Final Flight (TNT); Alfre Woodard as Berniece Charles in The Piano Lesson (CBS)
Outstanding Individual Performance in a Variety or Music Program: Barbra Streisand – Barbra Streisand: The Concert (HBO); Julie Andrews – The Sound of Julie Andrews (Disney Channel); Carol Burnett – Men, Movies and Carol (CBS); Rosie O'Donnell – Rosie O'Donnell (HBO); Tracey Ullman – Women of the Night (HBO)

==== Supporting performances ====
Outstanding Supporting Actor in a Comedy Series: David Hyde Pierce as Dr. Niles Crane in Frasier (NBC) (Episodes: "Flour Child" + "An Affair to Forget"); Jason Alexander as George Costanza in Seinfeld (NBC) (Episodes: "The Gymnast" + The Race); Michael Richards as Cosmo Kramer in Seinfeld (NBC) (Episodes: "The Jimmy" + "The Fusilli Jerry"); David Schwimmer as Dr. Ross Geller in Friends (NBC) (Episodes: "The One with the Sonogram at the End" + "The One with the Blackout"); Rip Torn as Arthur in The Larry Sanders Show (HBO) (Episodes: "Like No Business I Know" + "Arthur's Crisis")	Outstanding Supporting Actress in a Comedy Series: Christine Baranski as Maryann Thorpe in Cybill (CBS) (Episode: "Starting on the Wrong Foot"); Lisa Kudrow as Phoebe Buffay in Friends (NBC) (Episodes: "The One with the Monkey" + "The One with Two Parts: Part 1"); Julia Louis-Dreyfus as Elaine Benes in Seinfeld (NBC) (Episodes: "The Beard" + "The Fusilli Jerry"); Laurie Metcalf as Jackie Harris in Roseanne (ABC) (Episodes: "Bed and Bored" + "Single Married Female"); Liz Torres as Mahalia Sanchez in The John Larroquette Show (NBC) (Episodes: "Faith" + "In the Pink")
Outstanding Supporting Actor in a Drama Series: Ray Walston as Henry Bone in Picket Fences (CBS) (Episode: "Final Judgement"); Héctor Elizondo as Dr. Phillip Watters in Chicago Hope (CBS) (Episodes: "You Gotta Have Heart" + "Great White Hope"); James Earl Jones as Neb Langston in Under One Roof (CBS) (Episodes: "Pilot" + "Daddy's Girl"); Eriq La Salle as Dr. Peter Benton in ER (NBC) (Episodes: "9½ Hours" + "Everything Old Is New Again"); Noah Wyle as Dr. John Carter in ER (NBC) (Episodes: "Hit and Run" + "Sleepless in Chicago")	Outstanding Supporting Actress in a Drama Series: Julianna Margulies as Carol Hathaway in ER (NBC) (Episodes: "Make of Two Hearts" + "Sleepless in Chicago"); Barbara Babcock as Dorothy Jennings in Dr. Quinn, Medicine Woman (CBS) (Episode: "Ladies Night"); Tyne Daly as Alice Henderson in Christy (CBS) (Episode: "The Hunt"); Sharon Lawrence as Sylvia Costas in NYPD Blue (ABC) (Episodes: "Travels With Andy" + "Un-American Graffiti"); Gail O'Grady as Donna Abandando in NYPD Blue (ABC) (Episodes: "A Murder With Teeth In It" + "Un-American Graffiti")
Outstanding Supporting Actor in a Miniseries or a Special: Donald Sutherland as Fetisov in Citizen X (HBO); Jeffrey DeMunn as Chikatillo in Citizen X (HBO); Sam Elliott as Wild Bill Hickok in Buffalo Girls (CBS); Ben Kingsley as Potiphar in Joseph (TNT); Edward James Olmos as Wilson Pinheiro in The Burning Season (HBO)	Outstanding Supporting Actress in a Miniseries or a Special: Judy Davis as Diane in Serving in Silence: The Margarethe Cammermeyer Story (NBC); Shirley Knight as Peggy Buckey in Indictment: The McMartin Trial (HBO); Sônia Braga as Regina De Carvalho in The Burning Season (HBO); Sissy Spacek as Spring Renfro in The Good Old Boys (TNT); Sada Thompson as Virginia McMartin in Indictment: The McMartin Trial (HBO)

=== Directing ===
Outstanding Individual Achievement in Directing for a Comedy Series: Frasier (NBC): "The Matchmaker" – David Lee; Friends (NBC): "The One with the Blackout" – James Burrows; The Larry Sanders Show (HBO): "Hank's Night in the Sun" – Todd Holland; The Nanny (CBS): "Canasta Master" – Lee Shallat Chemel; Seinfeld (NBC): "The Jimmy" – Andy Ackerman	Outstanding Individual Achievement in Directing for a Drama Series: ER (NBC): "Love's Labor Lost" – Mimi Leder; Chicago Hope (CBS): "Life Support" – Lou Antonio; ER (NBC): "Pilot" – Rod Holcomb; My So-Called Life (ABC): "Pilot" – Scott Winant; NYPD Blue (ABC): "Innuendo" – Mark Tinker
Outstanding Individual Achievement in Directing for a Variety or Music Program: The 67th Annual Academy Awards (ABC) – Jeff Margolis; Barbra Streisand: The Concert (HBO) – Barbra Streisand and Dwight Hemion; The Kennedy Center Honors: A Celebration of the Performing Arts (CBS) – Louis J. Horvitz; Late Show with David Letterman (CBS) – Hal Gurnee; The Tonight Show with Jay Leno (NBC) – Ellen Brown	Outstanding Individual Achievement in Directing for a Miniseries or a Special: The Burning Season (HBO) – John Frankenheimer; Citizen X (HBO) – Chris Gerolmo; Indictment: The McMartin Trial (HBO) – Mick Jackson; The Piano Lesson (CBS) – Lloyd Richards; Serving in Silence: The Margarethe Cammermeyer Story (NBC) – Jeff Bleckner

=== Writing ===
Outstanding Individual Achievement in Writing for a Comedy Series: Frasier (NBC): "An Affair to Forget" – Chuck Ranberg and Anne Flett-Giordano; Frasier (NBC): "The Matchmaker" – Joe Keenan; Friends (NBC): "The One Where Underdog Gets Away" – Jeff Greenstein and Jeff Strauss; The Larry Sanders Show (HBO): "Hank's Night in the Sun" – Peter Tolan; The Larry Sanders Show (HBO): "The Mr. Sharon Stone Show" – Garry Shandling and Peter Tolan	Outstanding Individual Achievement in Writing for a Drama Series: ER (NBC): "Love's Labor Lost" – Lance Gentile; ER (NBC): "Pilot" – Michael Crichton; My So-Called Life (ABC): "Pilot" – Winnie Holzman; NYPD Blue (ABC): "Simone Says" – Story by : Steven Bochco, David Milch and Walon Green Teleplay by : Walon Green and David Milch; The X-Files (Fox): "Duane Barry" – Chris Carter
Outstanding Individual Achievement in Writing for a Variety or Music Program: Dennis Miller Live (HBO); The Kids in the Hall (CBS); Late Show with David Letterman Video Special (CBS); Mystery Science Theater 3000 (Comedy Central); Politically Incorrect with Bill Maher (Comedy Central)	Outstanding Individual Achievement in Writing for a Miniseries or a Special: Serving in Silence: The Margarethe Cammermeyer Story (NBC) – Alison Cross; The Burning Season (HBO) – Story by : William Mastrosimone Teleplay by : William Mastrosimone, Michael Tolkin and Ron Hutchinson; Citizen X (HBO) – Chris Gerolmo; Indictment: The McMartin Trial (HBO) – Abby Mann and Myra Mann; The Piano Lesson (CBS) – August Wilson

== Most major nominations ==
Networks with multiple major nominations (Note: "Major" constitutes the categories listed above: Program, Acting, Directing, and Writing. Does not include the technical categories.)
Network	No. of Nominations
NBC	56
CBS	32
HBO	27
ABC	20

Programs with multiple major nominations
Program	Category	Network	No. of Nominations
ER	Drama	NBC	11
NYPD Blue	Drama	ABC	7
The Burning Season	Movie	HBO	6
Frasier	Comedy	NBC	6
Indictment: The McMartin Trial	Movie	HBO	6
The Larry Sanders Show	Comedy	HBO	6
Seinfeld	Comedy	NBC	6
Citizen X	Movie	HBO	5
Friends	Comedy	NBC	5
The Piano Lesson	Movie	CBS	5
Serving in Silence: The Margarethe Cammermeyer Story	Movie	NBC	5
Chicago Hope	Drama	CBS	4
Barbra Streisand: The Concert	Variety	HBO	3
Buffalo Girls	Miniseries	CBS	3
Mad About You	Comedy	NBC	3
My So-Called Life	Drama	ABC	3
Roseanne	Comedy	ABC	3
The 67th Annual Academy Awards	Variety	ABC	2
Cybill	Comedy	CBS	2
Dennis Miller Live	Variety	HBO	2
Joseph	Miniseries	TNT	2
Late Show with David Letterman	Variety	CBS	2
Picket Fences	Drama	CBS	2
Politically Incorrect with Bill Maher	Variety	Comedy Central	2
The Tonight Show with Jay Leno	Variety	NBC	2
A Woman of Independent Means	Miniseries	NBC	2
The X-Files	Drama	Fox	2

== Most major awards ==
Networks with multiple major awards
Network	No. of Awards
NBC	12
HBO	8
CBS	5
ABC	2

Programs with multiple major awards
Program	Category	Network	No. of Awards
Frasier	Comedy	NBC	5
ER	Drama	NBC	3
Serving in Silence: The Margarethe Cammermeyer Story	Movie	NBC	3
Barbra Streisand: The Concert	Variety	HBO	2
The Burning Season	Movie	HBO	2
Indictment: The McMartin Trial	Movie	HBO	2
Picket Fences	Drama	CBS	2
