= Land defender =

Type of activist

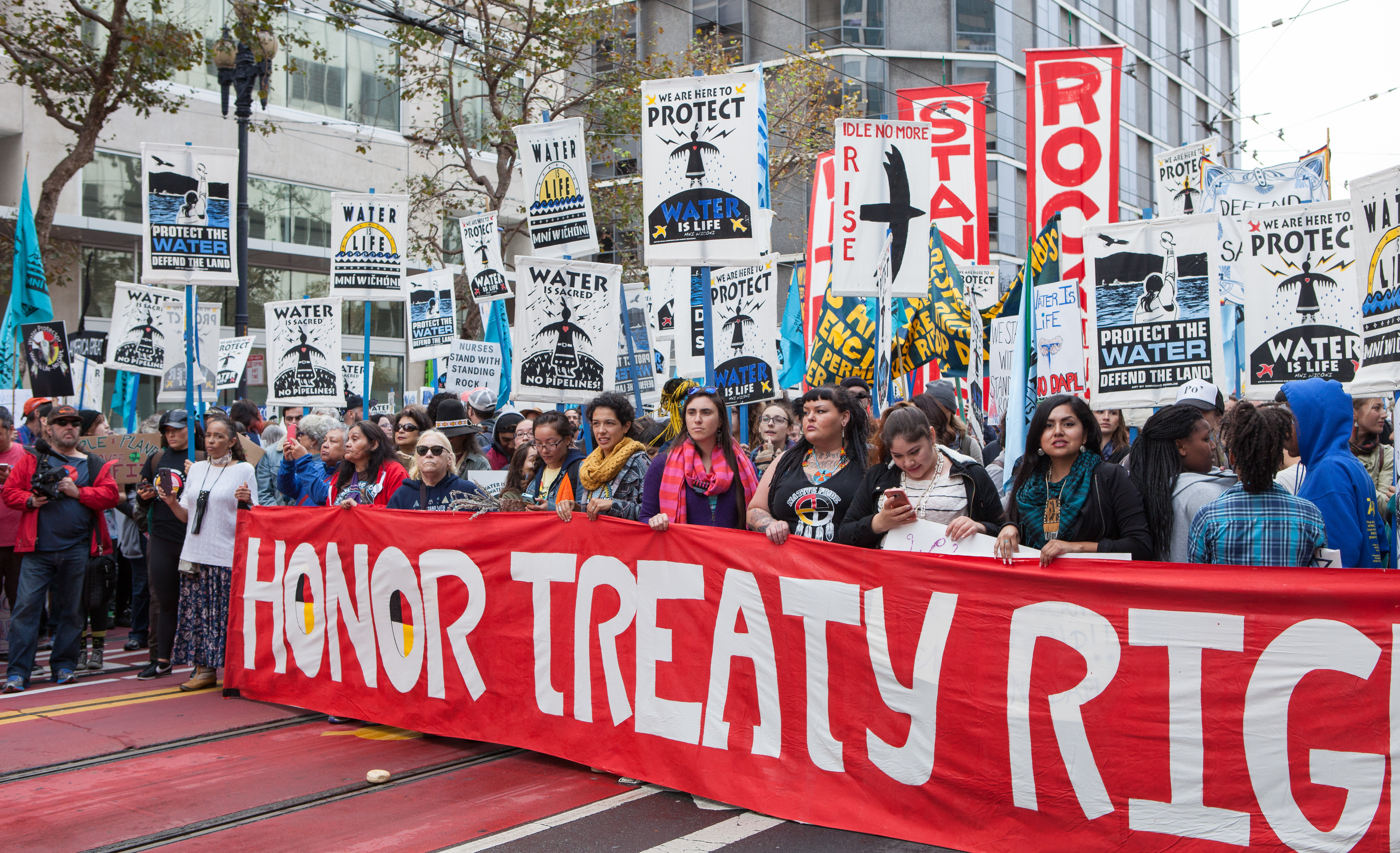
2016 "Stand with Standing Rock" march. Slogans include "We are here to protect" and "Defend the land."

A land defender, land protector, or environmental defender is an activist who works to protect ecosystems and the human right to a safe, healthy environment. Often, defenders are members of Indigenous communities who are protecting property rights of ancestral lands in the face of expropriation, pollution, depletion, or destruction. Land and its resources may be considered sacred by Indigenous peoples, and caring for land is considered a duty that honors ancestors, current peoples, and future generations.

In 2021, the United Nations Human Rights Council determined that land defenders are "among the human rights defenders who are most exposed and at risk."

== Etymology, role and activism ==
Land and water defenders of the Standing Rock Sioux Reservation in 2016.

During the 2016 Dakota Access Pipeline protests, members of the Standing Rock Sioux Reservation blocked the construction of the pipeline to protect the tribe's land and water supply. This grassroots effort led to hundreds of arrests and clashes with the police and National Guard soldiers. Negative articles described the Indigenous land defenders as "protesters," a term denounced by many environmental activists.

Environmental activist and actor Dallas Goldtooth of the Indigenous Environmental Network has criticized the term "protester," stating the word "protester" is negative and implies that Native people are angry, violent, or overprotective of resources.

Instead, members of the movement refer to themselves as "land defenders," a term that emphasizes pacifism and responsibility to care for ancestral lands which may be part of the defender's heritage.

Inuit Labrador land protector Denise Cole has stated, "I am very much a believer when I take my medicines, when I take my drum, what colonial law would call protesting is very much what I consider is ceremony."

Land defenders play an active and increasingly visible role in actions intended to protect, honour, and make visible the importance of land. There are strong connections between the water protector movement, land defender movement, and Indigenous environmental activism. Land defenders resist the installation of pipelines, fossil fuel industries, the destruction of territory for development such as agriculture or housing, and resource extraction activities such as fracking because these actions can lead to the degradation of land, destruction of forest, and disruption of habitat. Land defenders resist activities that harm land, especially across Indigenous territories and their work is tied to human rights. Yazzie points to the resistance tactics of Diné land defenders and their anti-capitalist and anti-development stance on resource extraction as being highly connected to the longstanding traditions of Diné resistance.

Activism can come in the form of the erection of blockades on reserve lands or traditional territories to block corporations from resource extraction activities. Water and land protectors also erect camps as a way to occupy traditional territories and strengthen cultural ties. Land defenders also work through legal frameworks such as government court systems in effort to keep control of traditional territories. Civil disobedience actions taken by land defenders, are frequently criminalized and some have argued subject to heavier policing and violence.

Women are integral to the success of the movement, as they are often land defenders visible at the front of blockades and in resistance protests.

== Dangers facing land defenders ==
Global Witness reported 1,922 murders of land defenders in 57 countries between 2002 and 2019. 40% of the victims were Indigenous, despite making up 6% of the global population. Documentation of this violence is also incomplete.

In 2020, murders of land defenders hit a record high of 227.

U.N. Special Rapporteur David R. Boyd has asked, "How can we protect the extraordinary diversity of life on Earth if we cannot protect environmental defenders?" He has further stated that as many as one hundred land defenders are intimidated, arrested or otherwise harassed for every one that is killed.

Land defenders often face perilous conditions in opposition to state powers, resource corporations such as gas or mining corporations, others seeking to develop land or extinguish Indigenous land rights. American environmentalist Bill McKibben has stated, "[Defenders are] at risk because they find themselves living on or near something that some corporation is demanding. That demand – the demand for the highest possible profit, the quickest possible timeline, the cheapest possible operation – seems to translate eventually into the understanding, somewhere, that the troublemaker must go."

Middeldorp and Le Billon have pointed to the dangers faced by land defenders, particularly in authoritarian regimes. In their 2018 article on the topic the point to the killings of several land defenders in Honduras. There, paramilitaries in the Aguán valley were sent to infiltrate and murder key lands rights activists to undermine group efforts. One may et al connect the suppression of Indigenous land rights and a history of intimidation, violent tactics and murder against land defenders to economic development and "land grabs" in colonial nation states.

The Canadian national police force, the RCMP, were prepared to use deadly force against land defenders in a 2019 protest in British Columbia.

Dunlop connects acts of violence against land defenders in countries such as Mexico as retaliation for resistance to economic development and resource extraction.

The human rights organization Global Witness reported that 164 land defenders were killed in 2018 in countries such as the Philippines, Brazil, India, and Guatemala. This same report stated a significant number of the people killed, injured, and threatened were Indigenous. Le Billon and Lujala report that at least 1734 environmental and land defenders were killed between 2002 and 2018 and that Indigenous people are most at risk, numbering more than a third of land defenders killed. The UN has reported that many land protectors are labelled as terrorists by state governments in an effort to discredit their claims. Such labelling can create dangerous conditions for those working to protect land rights.

Yale Environment 360 reported that at least 212 environmental campaigners and land defenders were murdered in 2019. Over half of the murders reported in 2019 took place in Colombia and the Philippines.

Amnesty International has called attention to the dangers facing those seeking to protect the earth, water, and communities, calling Latin America the most dangerous location for land defenders. The Environmental Defence Fund has reported that over 1700 defenders have been killed with less than 10% of those responsible brought to justice. The Extinction Rebellion (XR) has worked to bring attention to the situation of land defenders and have honoured those who have been killed and the work of land defenders has been linked to climate justice initiatives such as Climate Strike Canada.

== Notable instances of land defense ==
- Deadly land conflicts in Honduras date back to the early 1990s.
- The Dakota Access Pipeline protests in 2016.
- The occupation of the Atlanta Forest by self-described forest defenders such as Tortuguita, & the broader 'Defend Atlanta Forest' movement to prevent the building of the Atlanta Public Safety Training Center within it. (2022–present)
- 2020 Canadian pipeline and railway protests included both Canadian and Indigenous peoples opposing a pipeline through unceded territory.
- Oka Crisis - Opposition to a golf course construction on Indigenous land.
- Red Hill Valley Parkway opposition in Hamilton, Ontario, Canada. Defenders blocked construction of a highway.

== Land defenders who have been killed ==
- Berta Isabel Cáceres Flores (4 March 1971 – 2 March 2016) Honduran environmental activist, indigenous leader
- Paulo Paulino Guajajara, Brazil, killed in 2019 an ambush by illegal loggers the Amazon region.
- Chico Mendes, Brazil, Environmentalist and activist.
- Hernán Bedoya, Afro-Colombian land rights activist.
- Julián Carrillo, indigenous Rarámuri leader, Mexico, killed 24 October 2018.
- Datu Kaylo Bontolan, Manobo tribal chieftain, member of the National Council of Leaders of Katribu, Northern Mindanao, Philippines, killed 7 April 2019.
- Omar Guasiruma, Indigenous leader, Colombia, killed March 2020.
- Ernesto Guasiruma, Indigenous leader, Colombia, killed March 2020.
- Simón Pedro Pérez, Indigenous leader, killed 6 July 2021, Chiapas, Mexico.
- Javiera Rojas, Chilean environmentalist and activist, found dead in November 2021.
- Tortuguita, United States environmental activist killed on 18 January 2023, by a Georgia State Patrol trooper in the Atlanta forest.

== See also ==
- Unistʼotʼen Camp
- Water protector
