= Maria do Espírito Santo =

Brazilian environmental activist (1960–2011)

- Born: 8 December 1960; São João do Araguaia, Pará, Brazil
- Died: 24 May 2011 (aged 50); Maçaranduba, near Nova Ipixuna, Pará, Brazil
- Cause of death: Gunshot wounds
- Occupation: Environmental activist
- Years active: 1986–2011
- Organization: Praialta Piranheira Agro-Extractive Settlement Project
- Spouse: José Cláudio da Silva (married 1986)
- Children: 5
- Relatives: Claudelice Silva dos Santos (sister-in-law)

Maria do Espírito Santo da Silva (8 December 1960 – 24 May 2011) was a Brazilian farmer, environmentalist and trade unionist. She was known for her land defence, alongside her husband, José Cláudio da Silva, of the Praialta Piranheira nature reserve within the Amazon rainforest, as well as her campaigning for agrarian reform in southeastern Pará.

== Biography ==
Do Espírito Santo was born and raised in São João do Araguaia in Pará, the daughter of migrants from Maranhão. She grew up in a nut grove crossed by the Ubá river; her parents made a living collecting nuts. She married and had five children; her husband was abusive and they later separated. She met da Silva in 1986 while she was a poll worker at a polling station he was voting at; they subsequently married and moved to Nova Ipixuna.

While living in Nova Ipixuna, do Espírito Santo and da Silva resided in the Praialta Piranheira Agro-Extractive Settlement Project. They collected nuts and were members of the agroforestry group Projeto Agro-Extractivista. They campaigned against illegal logging and timber trafficking, as well as charcoal production and cattle ranching, in the area for 24 years.

On 24 May 2011, do Espírito Santo was shot and killed alongside her husband in an ambush in Maçaranduba 2, within the Praialta Piranheira nature reserve, close to their home in Nova Ipixuna, Pará. Prior to their deaths, da Silva had reported receiving death threats from loggers and cattle ranchers, which had been shared with the police. National and international media outlets, including Diário do Pará and The Guardian, reported that do Espírito Santo and da Silva had been refused protection from local authorities. Their murders were compared to the killings of Chico Mendes in 1988 and Dorothy Stang in 2005.

On 4 April, Lindonjonson Silva Rocha and Alberto Lopes do Nascimiento were sentenced to 42 and 45 years respectively for the murders of do Espírito Santo and da Silva; their trial had begun the previous day at a court in Marabá. A third defendant, local landowner José Rodrigues Moreira, was released after the police were unable to establish a link between him and the shooting, despite it being reported that he had ordered the killings. A subsequent retrial and arrest warrant was annulled in 2014 by a court in Belém.

== Recognition ==
In 2011, do Espírito Santo and da Silva were posthumously honoured with the Forest Hero Award from the United Nations' Forum on Forests Secretariat.
