= José Ribeiro da Silva =

José Ribeiro da Silva can refer to:

- José Cláudio Ribeiro da Silva (1957–2011), Brazilian conservationist and environmentalist
- José Leonardo Ribeiro da Silva (born 1988), Brazilian footballer
