= 1st Screen Actors Guild Awards =

- Awarded for: Outstanding motion picture and primetime television performances
- Date: February 25, 1995
- Location: Universal Studios, Stage 12; Los Angeles, California
- Country: United States
- Presented by: Screen Actors Guild
- Website: www.sagawards.org

Television/radio coverage
- Network: NBC

The inaugural Screen Actors Guild Awards aired on NBC from Stage 12 at Universal Studios Hollywood, on February 25, 1995. Unveiled during this evening was the Guild's new award statuette, the Actor, as well as the first awards for ensembles in drama series and comedy series which honor all of the actors who are the regulars in television series.

== Winners and nominees ==
Winners are listed first and highlighted in boldface.

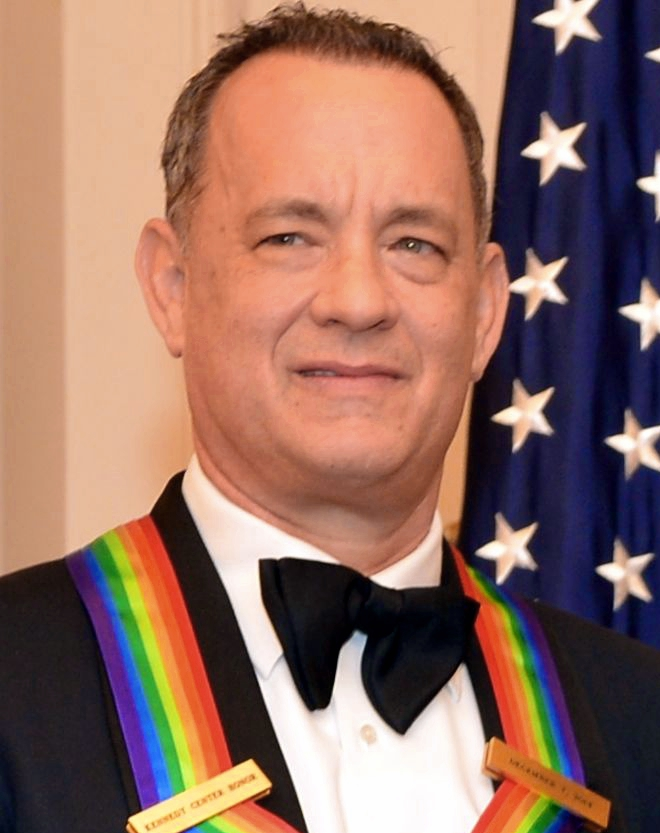
Tom Hanks, Outstanding Performance by a Male Actor in a Leading Role winner

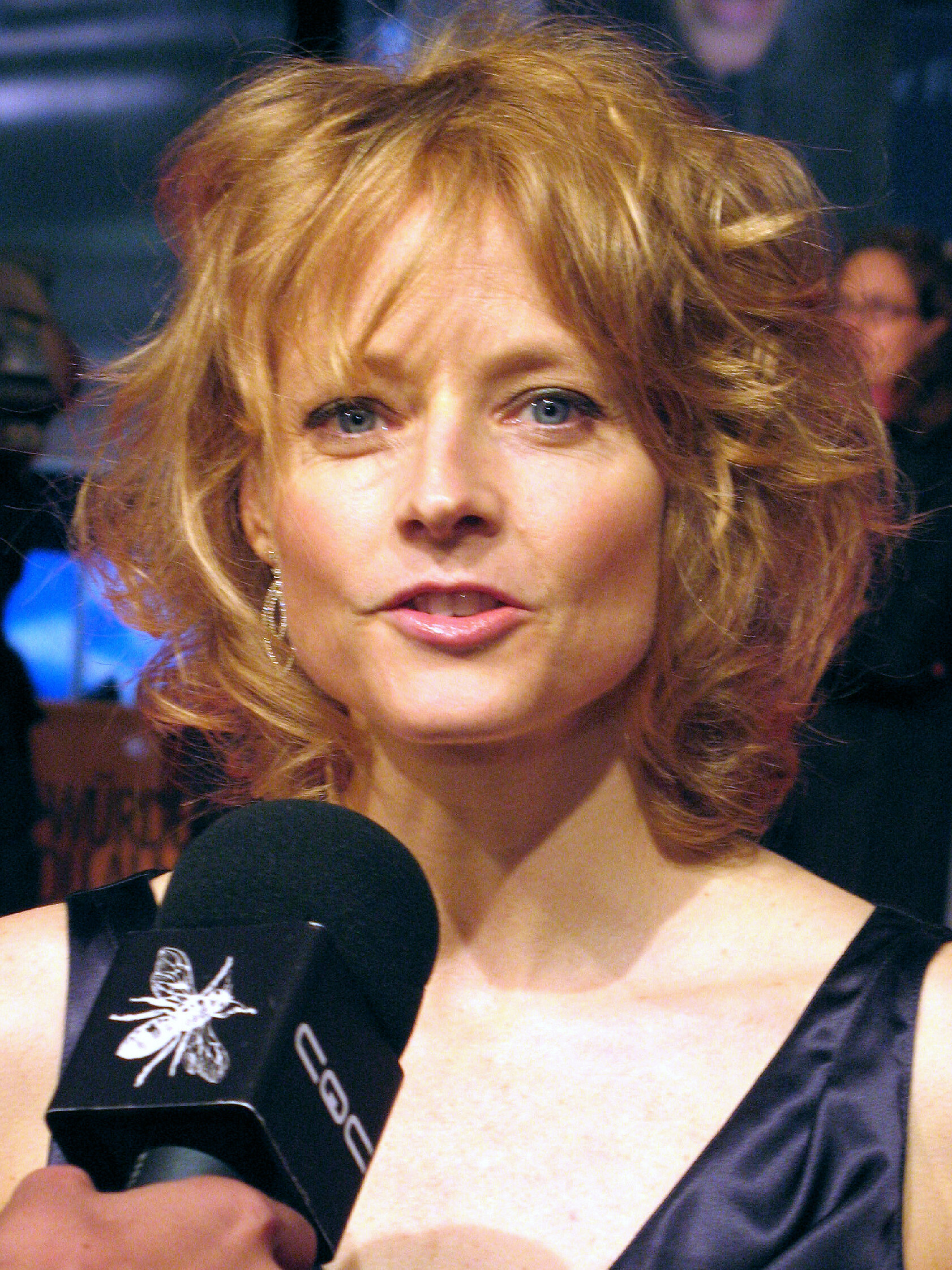
Jodie Foster, Outstanding Performance by a Female Actor in a Leading Role winner

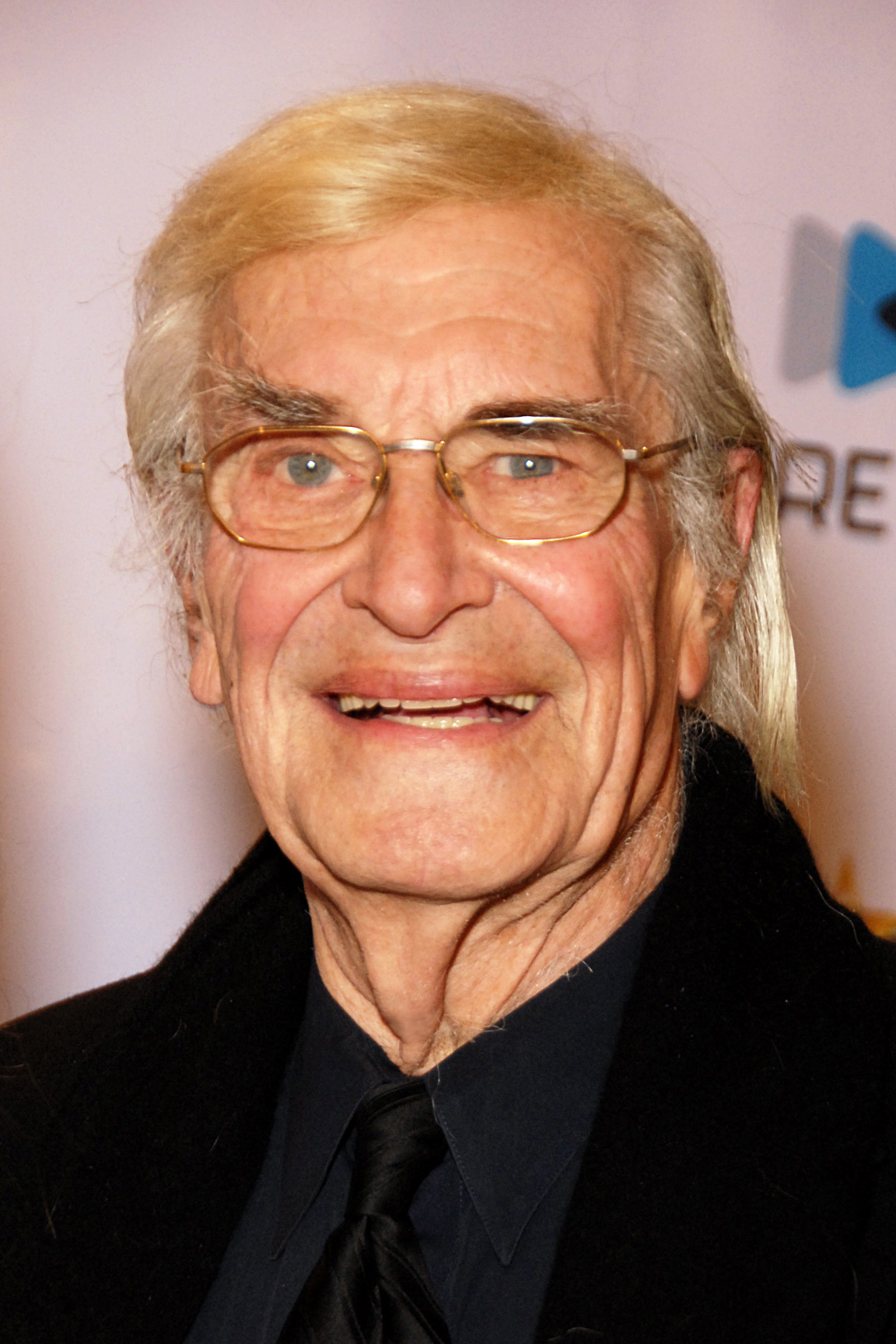
Martin Landau, Outstanding Performance by a Male Actor in a Supporting Role winner

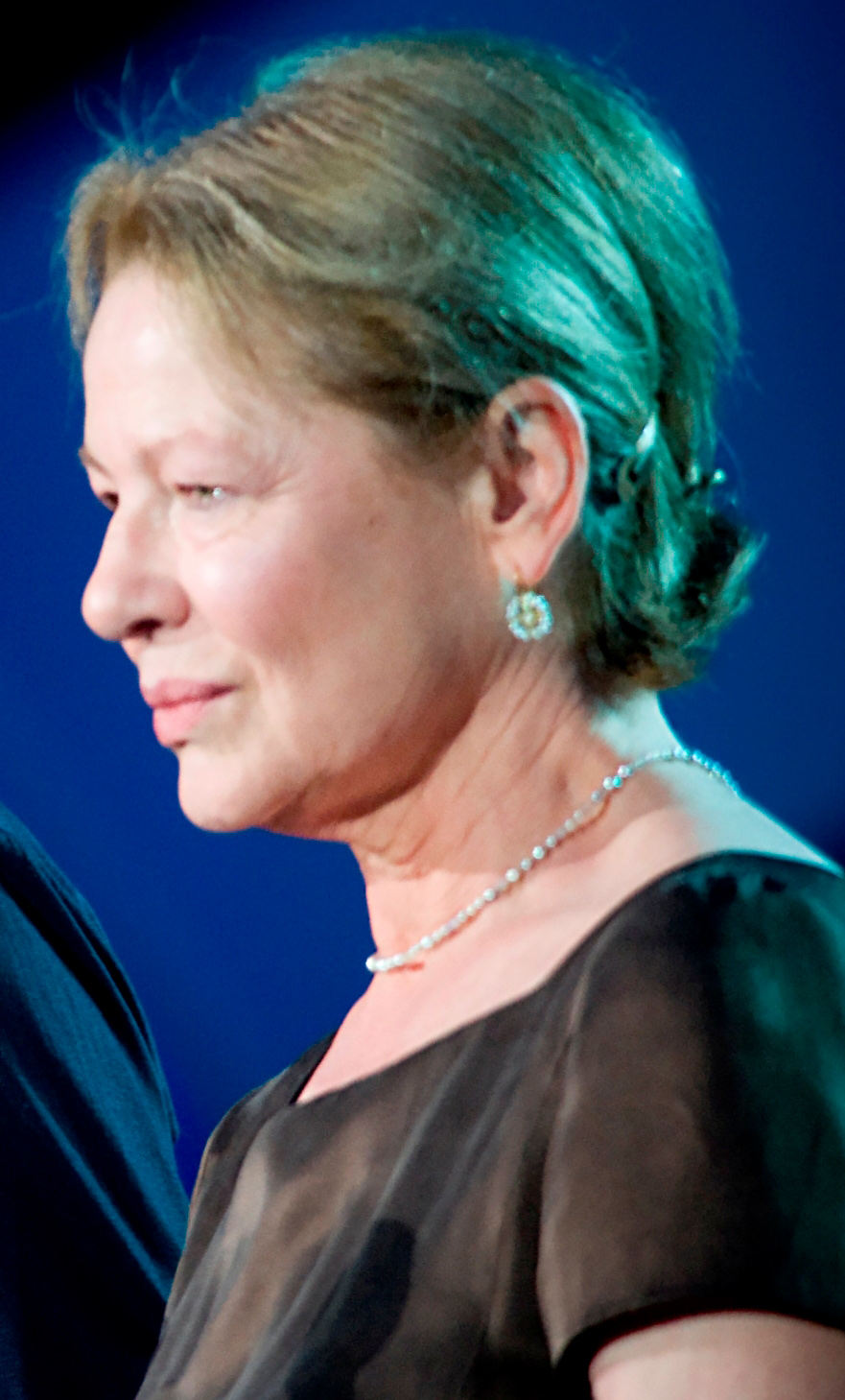
Dianne Wiest, Outstanding Performance by a Female Actor in a Supporting Role winner

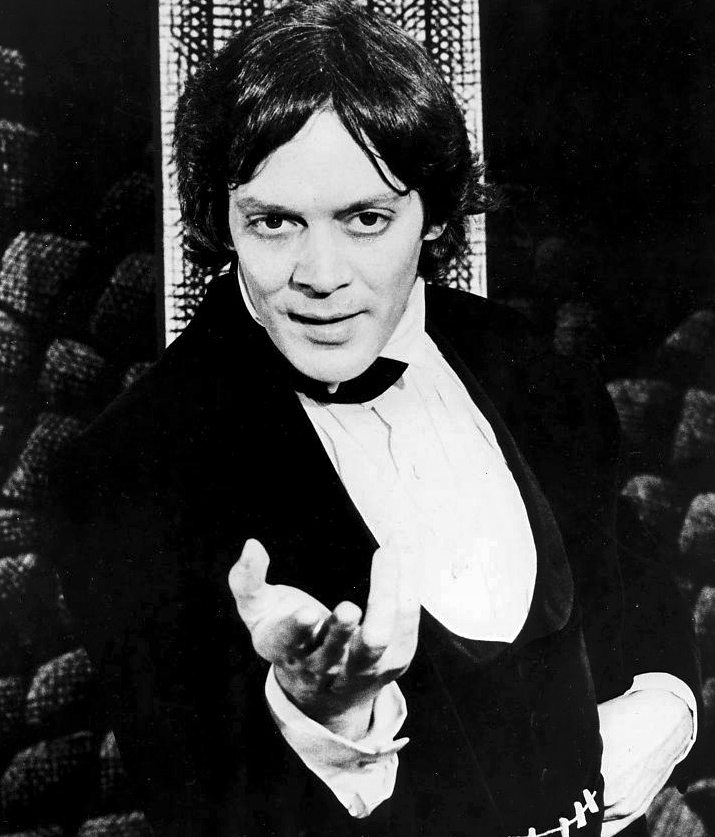
Raúl Juliá, Outstanding Performance by a Male Actor in a Miniseries or Television Movie winner

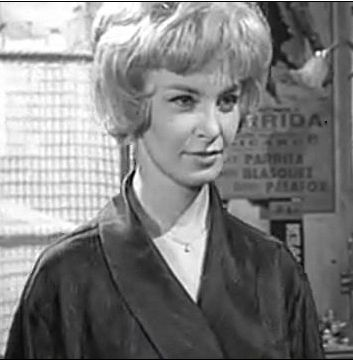
Joanne Woodward, Outstanding Performance by a Female Actor in a Miniseries or Television Movie winner

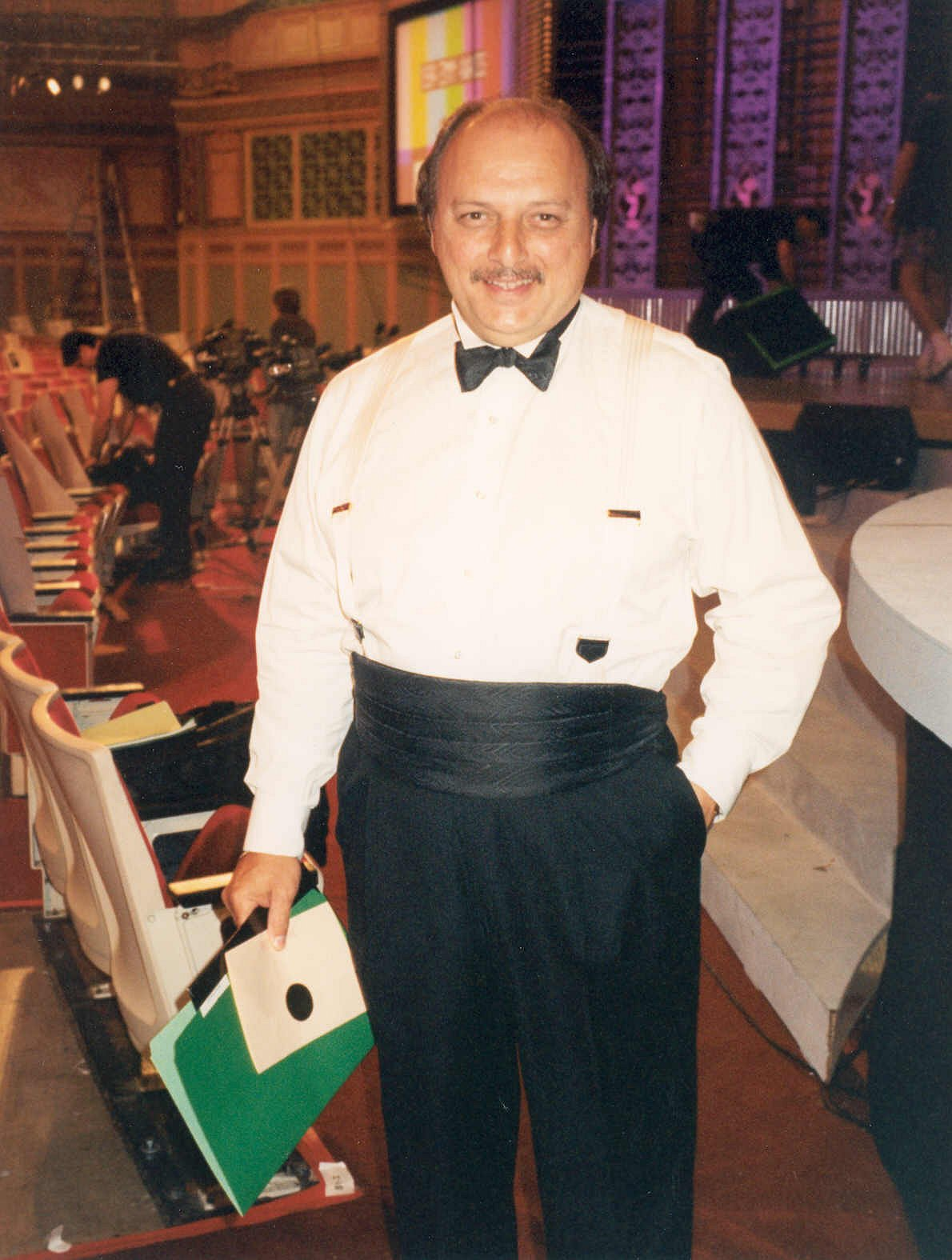
Dennis Franz, Outstanding Performance by a Male Actor in a Drama Series winner

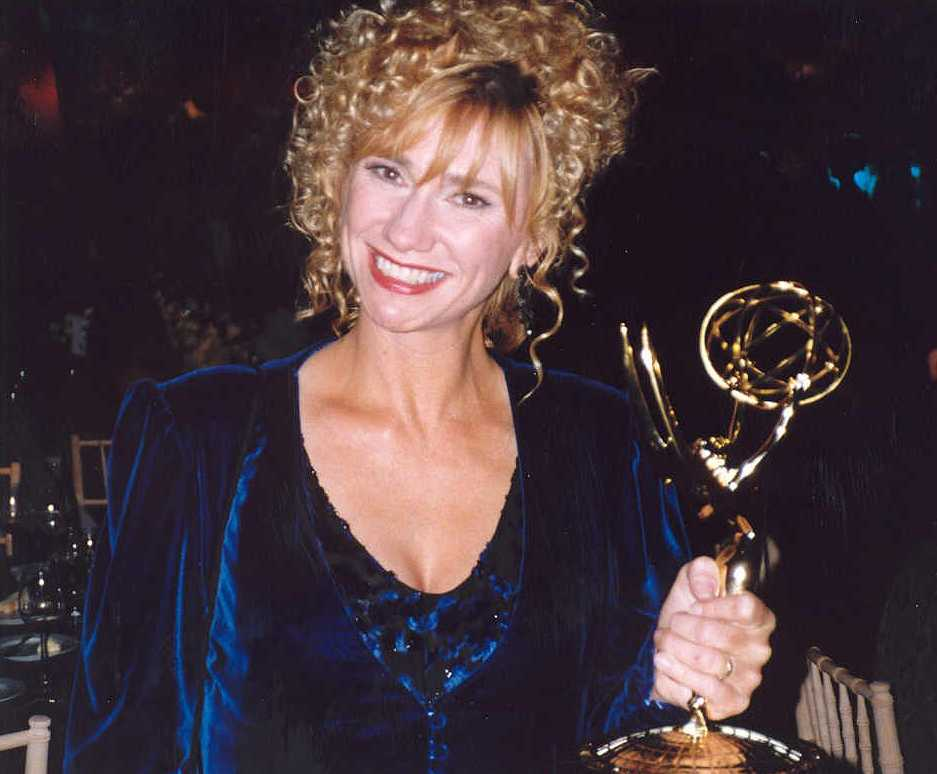
Kathy Baker, Outstanding Performance by a Female Actor in a Drama Series winner

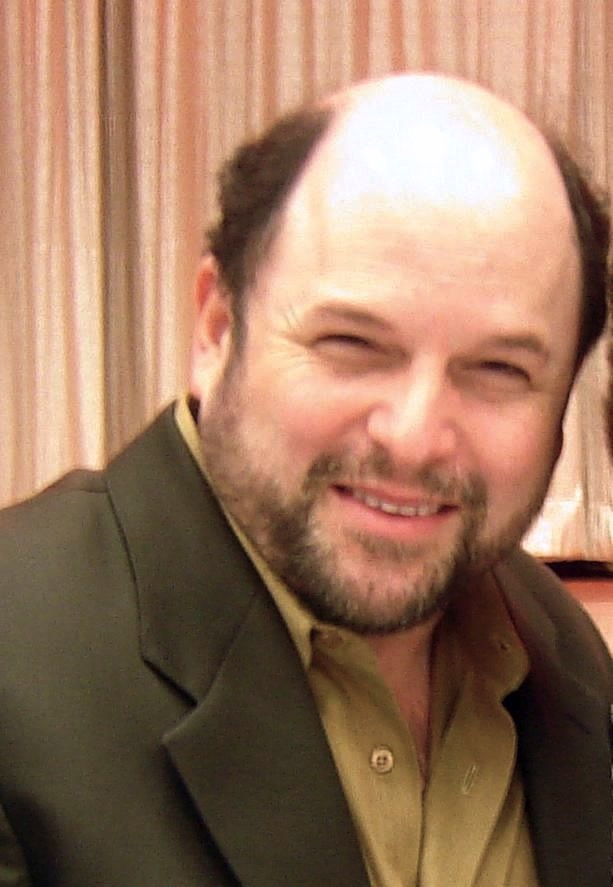
Jason Alexander, Outstanding Performance by a Male Actor in a Comedy Series winner

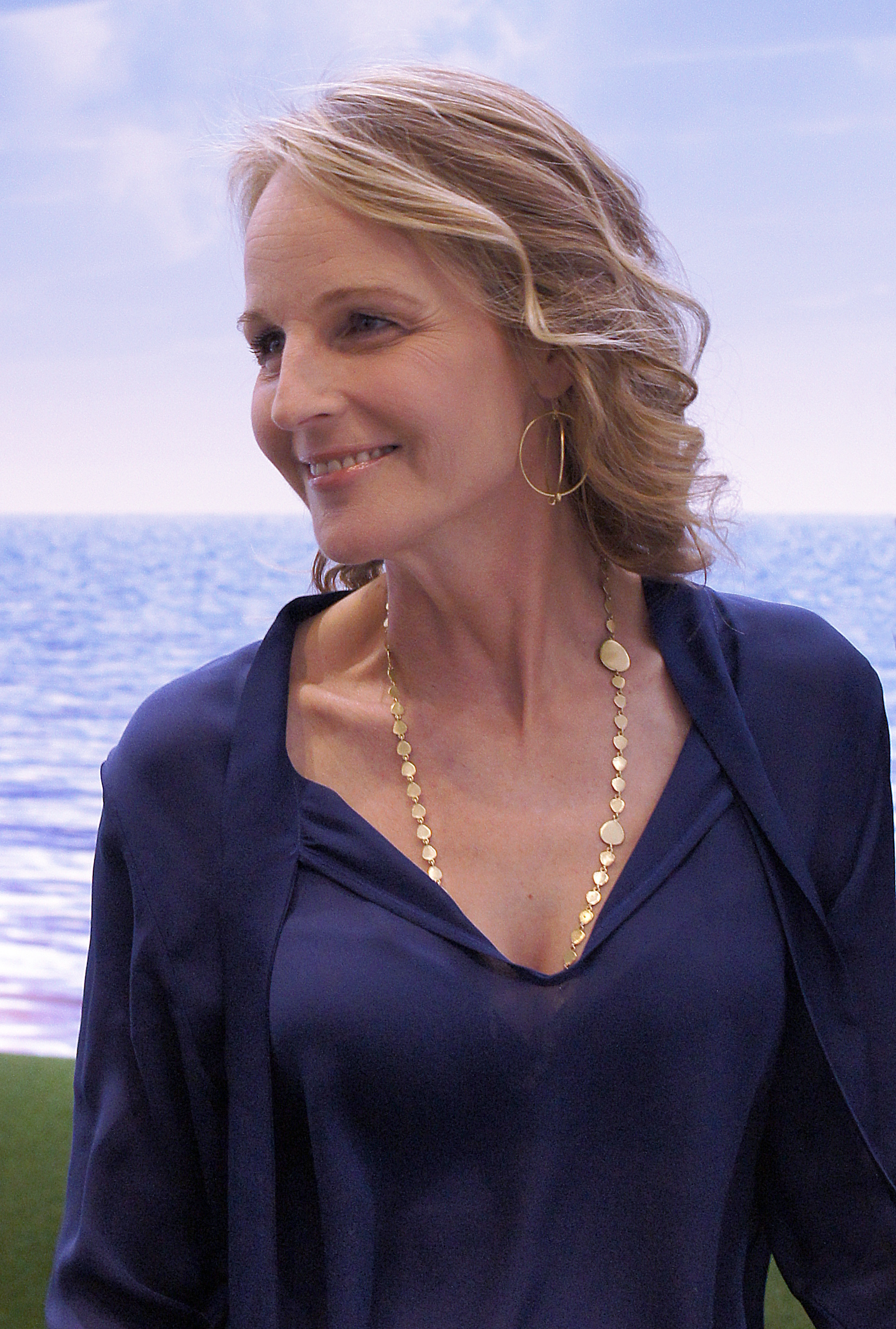
Helen Hunt, Outstanding Performance by a Female Actor in a Comedy Series winner

=== Film ===
Outstanding Performance by a Male Actor in a Leading Role	Outstanding Performance by a Female Actor in a Leading Role
**Tom Hanks – Forrest Gump as Forrest Gump**; Morgan Freeman – The Shawshank Redemption as Ellis Boyd "Red" Redding; Paul Newman – Nobody's Fool as Donald "Sully" Sullivan; Tim Robbins – The Shawshank Redemption as Andy Dufresne; John Travolta – Pulp Fiction as Vincent Vega	**Jodie Foster – Nell as Nell Kellty**; Jessica Lange – Blue Sky as Carly Marshall; Meg Ryan – When a Man Loves a Woman as Alice Green; Susan Sarandon – The Client as Regina "Reggie" Love; Meryl Streep – The River Wild as Gail Hartman
Outstanding Performance by a Male Actor in a Supporting Role	Outstanding Performance by a Female Actor in a Supporting Role
**Martin Landau – Ed Wood as Bela Lugosi**; Samuel L. Jackson – Pulp Fiction as Jules Winnfield; Chazz Palminteri – Bullets over Broadway as Cheech; Gary Sinise – Forrest Gump as Lieutenant Dan Taylor; John Turturro – Quiz Show as Herb Stempel	**Dianne Wiest – Bullets over Broadway as Helen Sinclair**; Jamie Lee Curtis – True Lies as Helen Tasker; Sally Field – Forrest Gump as Mrs. Gump; Uma Thurman – Pulp Fiction as Mia Wallace; Robin Wright – Forrest Gump as Jenny Curran-Gump

=== Television ===
Outstanding Performance by a Male Actor in a Miniseries or Television Movie	Outstanding Performance by a Female Actor in a Miniseries or Television Movie
**Raúl Juliá – The Burning Season as Francisco "Chico" Mendes**; James Garner – The Rockford Files: I Still Love L.A. as Jim Rockford; John Malkovich – Heart of Darkness as Kurtz; Gary Sinise – The Stand as Stu Redman; Forest Whitaker – The Enemy Within as Col. Mackenzie "Mac" Casey	**Joanne Woodward – Breathing Lessons as Maggie Moran**; Katharine Hepburn – One Christmas as Cornelia Beaumont; Diane Keaton – Amelia Earhart: The Final Flight as Amelia Earhart; Sissy Spacek – A Place for Annie as Susan Lansing; Cicely Tyson – Oldest Living Confederate Widow Tells All as Castralia, Marsden Family House Slave / Maid
Outstanding Performance by a Male Actor in a Drama Series	Outstanding Performance by a Female Actor in a Drama Series
**Dennis Franz – NYPD Blue as Andy Sipowicz**; Héctor Elizondo – Chicago Hope as Philip Waters; Mandy Patinkin – Chicago Hope as Jeffrey Geiger; Tom Skerritt – Picket Fences as Jimmy Brock; Patrick Stewart – Star Trek: The Next Generation as Jean-Luc Picard	**Kathy Baker – Picket Fences as Jill Brock**; Swoosie Kurtz – Sisters as Alexandra "Alex" Reed Halsey Barker; Angela Lansbury – Murder, She Wrote as Jessica Fletcher; Jane Seymour – Dr. Quinn, Medicine Woman as Dr. Michaela "Mike" Quinn; Cicely Tyson – Sweet Justice as Carrie Grace Battle
Outstanding Performance by a Male Actor in a Comedy Series	Outstanding Performance by a Female Actor in a Comedy Series
**Jason Alexander – Seinfeld as George Costanza**; John Goodman – Roseanne as Dan Conner; Kelsey Grammer – Frasier as Frasier Crane; David Hyde Pierce – Frasier as Niles Crane; Paul Reiser – Mad About You as Paul Buchman	**Helen Hunt – Mad About You as Jamie Buchman**; Candice Bergen – Murphy Brown as Murphy Brown; Ellen DeGeneres – Ellen as Ellen Morgan; Julia Louis-Dreyfus – Seinfeld as Elaine Benes; Roseanne Barr – Roseanne as Roseanne Conner
Outstanding Performance by an Ensemble in a Drama Series
**NYPD Blue – Gordon Clapp, Dennis Franz, Sharon Lawrence, James McDaniel, Gail O'Grady, Jimmy Smits, and Nicholas Turturro**; Chicago Hope – Adam Arkin, Héctor Elizondo, Thomas Gibson, Roxanne Hart, Peter MacNicol, E. G. Marshall, and Mandy Patinkin; ER – George Clooney, Anthony Edwards, Eriq La Salle, Julianna Margulies, Sherry Stringfield, and Noah Wyle; Law & Order – Jill Hennessy, Steven Hill, S. Epatha Merkerson, Chris Noth, Jerry Orbach, and Sam Waterston; Picket Fences – Kathy Baker, Don Cheadle, Holly Marie Combs, Kelly Connell, Robert Cornthwaite, Fyvush Finkel, Lauren Holly, Costas Mandylor, Justin Shenkarow, Tom Skerritt, Leigh Taylor-Young, Ray Walston, and Adam Wylie
Outstanding Performance by an Ensemble in a Comedy Series
**Seinfeld – Jason Alexander, Julia Louis-Dreyfus, Michael Richards, and Jerry Seinfeld**; Frasier – Peri Gilpin, Kelsey Grammer, Jane Leeves, John Mahoney, and David Hyde Pierce; Mad About You – Helen Hunt, Leila Kenzle, Richard Kind, Lisa Kudrow, John Pankow, Anne Ramsay, and Paul Reiser; Murphy Brown – Candice Bergen, Pat Corley, Faith Ford, Charles Kimbrough, Joe Regalbuto, and Grant Shaud; Northern Exposure – Darren E. Burrows, John Corbett, Barry Corbin, John Cullum, Cynthia Geary, Elaine Miles, Rob Morrow, Peg Phillips, Teri Polo, Paul Provenza, and Janine Turner

=== Screen Actors Guild Life Achievement Award ===
- George Burns

== Multiple nominations ==
=== Film ===
Nominations	Film
4	Forrest Gump
3	Pulp Fiction
2	Bullets Over Broadway
2	The Shawshank Redemption

=== Television ===
Nominations	Program
3	Chicago Hope
3	Frasier
3	Mad About You
3	Picket Fences
3	Seinfeld
2	Murphy Brown
2	NYPD Blue
2	Roseanne

== Multiple wins ==
=== Television ===
Wins	Program
2	NYPD Blue
2	Seinfeld
