= Claudelice Silva dos Santos =

Brazilian human rights activist (born 1982)

- Dos Santos in 2019
- Born: 1982 (age 43–44); Marabá, Pará, Brazil
- Occupation: Environmental activist
- Organization(s): Zé Cláudio & Maria Institute
- Known for: Campaigning against deforestation in the Amazon rainforest
- Children: 2
- Relatives: José Cláudio da Silva (brother); Maria do Espírito Santo (sister-in-law)

Claudelice Silva dos Santos (born 1982), also known as Claudelice da Silva Santos, is a Brazilian human rights activist. Known for her work to address issues of illegal logging and deforestation in the Amazon rainforest, in 2019 she was nominated for the European Parliament's Sakharov Prize for Freedom of Thought.

== Early life and education ==
Dos Santos was born in 1982 in Marabá, a city in Pará in northern Brazil, the youngest of 11 children. Her grandfather had moved to Pará in the 1960s from Maranhão to a plot of vacant land which he worked on as a subsistence farmer. Dos Santos is the younger sister of conservationist José Cláudio da Silva (1957–2011). She went on to study agriculture at university. She has two children.

== Activism ==
Dos Santos campaigned alongside her brother and his wife Maria do Espírito Santo against illegal logging near the family's farm near Nova Ipixuna. She became more prominent as an activist following the 2011 murders of her brother and sister-in-law, who were killed while working as conservationists attempting to combat illegal logging and deforestation in the Brazilian Amazon. Following their murders, dos Santos temporarily left her hometown, Marabá, settling in Santarém. From there, she called for justice for da Silva and do Espírito Santo, as well as accountability for their killers. Dos Santos accused the Brazilian government of being "negligent" in its duties towards the family, stating it had declined to provide protection to her brother and sister-in-law despite multiple previous threats and attacks against them in the years leading up to their murders. Dos Santos successfully campaigned for the 2014 judgement, which acquitted José Rodrigues and held da Silva and do Espírito Santo as responsible for their own deaths, to be overturned; Rodrigues was subsequently found guilty in 2016 and sentenced to 60 years in prison in absentia.

Following the verdict, dos Santos decided to continue da Silva and do Espírito Santo's campaigning. In 2016, she began studying land law through the National Education Programme in Agrarian Reform, graduating in 2021 with a bachelor's degree. Dos Santos subsequently returned to Marabá, where she established the Zé Claudio & Maria Institute in 2023, which aims to continue da Silva and do Espírito Santo's fight against deforestation in the Amazon, as well as promoting the right to access public land; greater punishment for environmental crimes; and the guarantee of the right to live safely in the rainforest.

Dos Santos lives at the Praia-Alta Piranheria Agroextractive Project started by her brother and sister-in-law at the São Vinicius Camp in Tinelli, Nova Ipixuna, Pará. As a result of her activism, the project has been the target of illegal loggers, cattle ranchers, and charcoal producers. On 3 November 2021, while dos Santos was attended the 2021 United Nations Climate Change Conference in the United Kingdom, the project was attacked by around 30 pickup trucks carrying armed men; several residents required hospitalisation as a result.

In addition to her activism in Pará, dos Santos has completed in outreach work to raise awareness among Brazilians of the situation in the Amazon, in addition to giving media interviews about the importance of maintaining the rainforest and its ecosystems in order to protect local lives and cultures.

== Recognition ==
In 2019, dos Santos was nominated for the Sakharov Prize, given annually by the European Parliament to recognise human rights activists from around the world.

In 2021, dos Santos was a member of the Brazilian delegation that attended the 2021 United Nations Climate Change Conference in Glasgow, United Kingdom.

In 2022, dos Santos featured in a documentary broadcast by the BBC World Service entitled Murder in the Heart of the Amazon.

In 2023, dos Santos was nominated for the Human Rights Tulip from the Dutch government.
