= Vicente Cañas =

Spanish Christian missionary

Vicente Cañas

Vicente Cañas, S.J. (October 22, 1939 – April 6, 1987) was a Spanish Christian missionary and Jesuit brother, born in Alborea, Albacete, who is credited with making the first peaceful contact with the Enawene Nawe Indian tribe in 1974. Afterwards, he lived with them for over ten years, adopting their way of life and helping them with necessary medical supplies. Due to his help, the Enawene Nawe population rebounded from a low of 97 individuals to a population of over 430. Similar to Chico Mendes and Wilson Pinheiro, he died at the hands of cattle ranchers who were destroying the Amazon Rainforest.

== History ==
Cañas helped the Enawene Nawe secure lands they considered necessary for their survival. In spite of receiving death threats from land owners and cattle ranchers, he successfully lobbied the Brazilian government for the territory to be officially granted for use by the Enawene Nawe tribe.

The Enawene Nawe were campaigning for the use of a tract of land known as the Rio Preto, an important fishing area, which was omitted from inclusion in their original territory. The tribe received numerous death threats from the local cattle ranchers subsequent to their lobbying.

The cultural survival of the Enawene Nawe is under constant threat. Their most pressing problem is the location of 5 mini hydroelectric generators located in the Juruena River, which is decreasing the native fish population. Because of this, the performing of the celebrated Yakwa festival may soon become impossible, putting at risk the heart of their rich religious tradition.

The Rio Preto (Adawina/Adowina) region has still not been demarcated, despite many years of work by the Enawene Nawe and a local indigenist NGO, OPAN (Operação Amazonia Nativa).

These threats are because of what Vicente (Kiwxi) saw all those years ago - colonisation of the state of Mato Grosso and Amazonia by soya monoculturalists led by the Maggi family.

== Assassination and aftermath ==
In 1987, a group of ranchers entered the home of Vicente Cañas, near the village of the Enawene Nawe tribe, and stabbed him to death. Subsequently, the investigation into his murder was marred by corruption and incompetence and none of the 6 suspected murderers people were initially charged.

Nineteen years after the murder of Vicente Cañas, the trial of those accused of killing him began in Cuiabá, capital of Mato Grosso state. The landmark trial began on October 24, 2006. Three men, which include the former police chief, are finally on trial. Two of the other accused murderers have long since died and a third man has been deemed "too old" to stand trial.

Ronaldo Antônio Osmar, the only one who could stand trial for the 1987 murder, was sentenced to 14 years and 3 months in prison, 11 years after being acquitted of the murder by a jury, who considered there was not enough evidence for a conviction.

== See also ==
- Wilson Pinheiro
- Dorothy Stang
- Chico Mendes
- José Cláudio Ribeiro da Silva
- Environment of Brazil
- Indigenous People in Brazil
