= The Burning Season (1994 film) =

- Genre: Biography; Drama
- Based on: The Burning Season by Andrew Revkin
- Screenplay by: William Mastrosimone; Michael Tolkin; Ron Hutchinson
- Story by: William Mastrosimone
- Directed by: John Frankenheimer
- Starring: Raul Julia; Carmen Argenziano; Sônia Braga; Kamala Lopez-Dawson; Luis Guzmán; Edward James Olmos
- Music by: Gary Chang
- Country of origin: United States
- Original language: English

Production
- Executive producer: David Puttnam
- Producers: John Frankenheimer; Thomas M. Hammel; Grazia Rade; Grazka Taylor
- Production location: Mexico
- Cinematography: John R. Leonetti
- Editors: Françoise Bonnot (sup); Paul Rubell
- Running time: 123 minutes
- Production company: HBO Pictures

Original release
- Network: HBO
- Release: September 16, 1994

The Burning Season is a 1994 American made-for-television biographical drama film directed by John Frankenheimer. The film chronicles environmental activist Chico Mendes' fight to protect the Amazon rainforest. This was Raul Julia's last film released during his lifetime, premiering on HBO on September 16, 1994, five weeks before his death. The film was based in part on the 1990 book of the same name by journalist Andrew Revkin.

== Plot ==
Chico Mendes was a Brazilian rubber tapper, unionist and environmental activist who was murdered in 1988 by ranchers opposed to his activism. The movie opens in 1951 with a young Mendes witnessing his father's interaction with corrupt ranchers who are exploiting peasants for their work. The bulk of the film then takes place between 1983 and 1988, showing Mendes' activism to preserve the Amazon rainforest, to his murder in a drive-by shooting by a disgruntled rancher waiting in the shadows.

== Cast ==
- Raul Julia as Francisco "Chico" Mendes
- Carmen Argenziano as Alfredo Sezero
- Sônia Braga as Regina de Carvalho
- Kamala Lopez as Ilzamar
- Luis Guzmán as Estate Boss
- Nigel Havers as Steven Kaye
- Tomas Milian as Darli Alves
- Esai Morales as Jair
- Edward James Olmos as Wilson Pinheiro
- Roger Cudney as Reporter

== Awards and nominations ==
Year	Award	Category	Nominee(s)	Result	Ref.
1995	American Cinema Editors Awards	Best Edited Motion Picture for Non-Commercial Television	Françoise Bonnot and Paul Rubell	Won	
1995	Artios Awards	Best Casting for TV Movie of the Week	Junie Lowry-Johnson	Nominated	
1995	CableACE Awards	Movie or Miniseries	David Puttnam, John Frankenheimer, Thomas M. Hammel, Diane Batson-Smith, and Ron Hutchinson	Nominated	
1995	CableACE Awards	Actor in a Movie or Miniseries	Raul Julia	Won (Note: Posthumous award.)	
1995	CableACE Awards	Directing a Movie or Miniseries	John Frankenheimer	Won	
1995	CableACE Awards	Editing a Dramatic Special or Series/Theatrical Special/Movie or Miniseries	Françoise Bonnot	Nominated	
1995	Environmental Media Awards	Made for Television Movie		Won	
1995	Golden Globe Awards	Best Miniseries or Motion Picture Made for Television		Won	
1995	Golden Globe Awards	Best Actor in a Miniseries or Motion Picture Made for Television	Raul Julia	Won	
1995	Golden Globe Awards	Best Supporting Actor in a Series, Miniseries or Motion Picture Made for Television	Edward James Olmos	Won	
1995	Golden Globe Awards	Best Supporting Actress in a Series, Miniseries or Motion Picture Made for Television	Sônia Braga	Nominated	
1995	Humanitas Prize	PBS/Cable Television	William Mastrosimone, Michael Tolkin, and Ron Hutchinson	Won	
1995	Primetime Emmy Awards	Outstanding Made for Television Movie	David Puttnam, John Frankenheimer, Thomas M. Hammel, and Diane Batson-Smith	Nominated	
1995	Primetime Emmy Awards	Outstanding Lead Actor in a Miniseries or a Special	Raul Julia	Won	
1995	Primetime Emmy Awards	Outstanding Supporting Actor in a Miniseries or a Special	Edward James Olmos	Nominated	
1995	Primetime Emmy Awards	Outstanding Supporting Actress in a Miniseries or a Special	Sônia Braga	Nominated	
1995	Primetime Emmy Awards	Outstanding Individual Achievement in Directing for a Miniseries or a Special	John Frankenheimer	Won	
1995	Primetime Emmy Awards	Outstanding Writing for a Miniseries or a Special	William Mastrosimone, Michael Tolkin, and Ron Hutchinson	Nominated	
1995	Screen Actors Guild Awards	Outstanding Performance by a Male Actor in a Television Movie or Miniseries	Raul Julia	Won	
