= Chicomendes =

Scientific classification
- Kingdom: Plantae
- Clade: Tracheophytes
- Clade: Angiosperms
- Clade: Eudicots
- Clade: Rosids
- Order: Malpighiales
- Family: Euphorbiaceae
- Genus: Chicomendes; W.Cordeiro & M.F.Sales
- Species: C. rubiginosus

Binomial name
- Chicomendes rubiginosus (Huft) W.Cordeiro, Athiê-Souza & A.L.Melo

Synonyms
- Tragia rubiginosa Huft (1989)

Genus of flowering plants

Chicomendes is a genus of flowering plant in the family Euphorbiaceae. Its only species is Chicomendes rubiginosus. It is a monoecious vine with reddish-brown stems. It is endemic to Peru where it is known from a single population in lowland Amazonian rainforest near Loreto. There may be a second population in the adjacent Brazilian Amazon.

The species was first named Tragia rubiginosa in 1989. It was placed in the monotypic genus Chicomendes in 2021. The genus is named for Brazilian Amazonian environmentalist Chico Mendes, who was murdered in 1988.
