= Environmental activist killings in Honduras =

The organization Global Witness has said that Honduras is the deadliest country in the world for environmental activists. In the period between 2009 and 2017, more than 120 environmental activists were killed.

== Background ==
Honduras is the poorest and most violent country (in terms of homicide) in Central America. About 16% of its population lives on a daily income of $1.90 USD or less, and 74.6 people per 100,000 are murdered each year. It also ranks lowest on the Human Development Index, with a score of 130. Honduras and Guatemala have the highest prevalence of direct violence against environmental activists. From 1959 to 2015, 79% of cases of environmental violence involving murder occurred in one of these two countries.

== Notable victims and incidents ==
- Berta Cáceres (1971–2016)
- Jeannette Kawas (1946–1995)
- María Enriqueta Matute
- Lesbia Urquía
- Tomás Garcia
- José Santos Sevilla
- Félix Vásquez killed on 26 December 2020 in his home in Santiago de Puringla.

The National Human Rights Commissioner of Honduras reports that 92 Hondurans were killed near Bajo Aguán from 2009–2012 due to conflicts over the expansion of palm oil plantations.

== Impact ==
In the 2009 Kawas v. Honduras, the Inter-American Court of Human Rights ruled that its member states have an obligation to protect environmental activists from human rights violations. The Court further ruled that the government of Honduras had violated the rights of Jeannette Kawas, including her right to life, right to humane treatment, and right to accessible justice. The ruling was called pioneering for its impact on environmental activists rights worldwide.

In 2018, Honduras and 23 other Latin American and Caribbean countries signed "The Regional Agreement on Access to Information, Public Participation and Access to Justice in Environmental Matters in Latin American and the Caribbean". The pact is meant to ensure stronger protections for environmental activists.

== See also ==
- Violence against women in Honduras
