= Paulo Paulino Guajajara =

Brazilian environmentalist (1992/1993 – 2019)

- Born: 1992 or 1993
- Died: 1 November 2019 (aged 26); Araribóia Indigenous Territory, Brazil
- Cause of death: Assassination
- Citizenship: Brazilian
- Occupations: Environmental activist; land defender

Paulo Paulino Guajajara (1992 or 1993 – 1 November 2019), also known as "Lobo" (Portuguese: "Wolf"), was a Brazilian Indigenous (Guajajara) environmental activist and land defender. He was killed by illegal loggers in an ambush inside the Araribóia in Maranhão.

== Activism ==
Guajajara was a member of a forest guard, the Guardians of the Forest, started originally in 2012 to ward off illegal loggers. The group of around 120 Indigenous activists aim to protect the 413,000 hectares of land in the Araribóia region against environmental crimes. The guardians report their findings to the Brazilian Institute of the Environment and Renewable Natural Resources and the Federal Police, but activists say they rarely receive help. At the end of September 2019, "the Guajajara sent a request for help to the National Indian Foundation (FUNAI) and the government of Maranhão, as threats by loggers and land grabbers had reached alarming levels." During an interview with Reuters just a few months before his death, Paulo told reporters that the guardians' job is often dangerous, but there is no other option, "I'm scared at times, but we have to lift up our heads and act. We are here fighting," he said.

== Assassination ==
On Friday 1 November 2019, Paulo Paulino Guajajara was fatally shot in the face while on a hunting trip inside the Arariboia Indigenous reserve in Maranhao. Illegal loggers were said to have ambushed Paulo and his cousin, Laercio Guajajara. Laercio was severely injured but survived. A logger also died in the attack on Friday night. Guajajara left behind a son.

=== Reactions ===
Gaujajara's murder occurred amid "an increased number of invasions on Indigenous reservations since President Jair Bolsonaro took office and promised to open the land up to economic development." In the aftermath of Paulo's death, various Indigenous organizations such as the Articulation of Indigenous Peoples of Brazil (APIB) issued statements condemning the attack and connecting it to the larger mistreatment of Indigenous peoples under Bolsonaro, "The Bolsonaro government has indigenous blood on its hands," the APIB said. The Brazilian government's Indigenous health service reported that in 2019, at least 113 Indigenous people were killed, in large part because like Paulo, they were "committed to the protection of the borders of their territories and fought against illegal logging and mining." Further, between "2000 and 2018, 42 Guajajara people were murdered."

=== Murder Investigation ===
After Paulo Guajajara's death, Sergio Moro, the justice and public security minister, stated that the federal police will be responsible for investigating the murder and "bring those responsible" to justice. In April 2020, two of the four presumed assailants, Antônio Wesley Nascimento Coelho and Raimundo Nonato Ferreira de Sousa were indicted by the Brazilian Federal Prosecutor's Office and charged with the first-degree murder of Paulo and attempted murder of Laércio. Later, the Federal Police, supported by the Prosecutor's Office, claimed that the murders should not be charged as a premeditated attacks. According to Yuri Costa, the Federal Public Attorney, the Federal Police "downplayed the murders as a private feud, specifically about motorcycles," forming no correlation between the crimes and Indigenous land defenders. A year after the murder, in November 2020, Laércio stated that justice had not yet been served, and no one had been officially sentenced for the death of his cousin.
