= Fikile Ntshangase =

South African environmental activist (died 2020)

- Born: 1957
- Died: 22 October 2020. Ophondweni
- Cause of death: Assassinated
- Occupation: Environmental activist

Fikile Ntshangase (born c. 1957) was a South African environmental activist who was assassinated on 22 October 2020. She was a leading member of the Mfolozi Community Environmental Justice Organisation (MCEJO), which is taking legal action against the proposed expansion of an open-cast coal mine operated by Tendele Coal Mining (Pty) Ltd, near Somkhele, situated near Hluhluwe–iMfolozi park, the oldest nature reserve in Africa.

== Environmental activism ==
=== Environmental work ===
Ntshangase was a Vice-Chairperson of a sub-committee of the MCEJO. The organisation previously challenged mining expansion in Mthethwa through Environmental Impact Assessment processes. MCEJO receives support from Earthlife Africa, groundWork, ActionAid South Africa, and WoMin.

==== Mpukunyoni Community ====
MCEJO became involved in challenging the Somkhele mine on the request of residents in the Mpukunyoni community. Tendele Coal Mining had been granted additional rights in the area and expansion of the mine would reach near the Hluhluwe-iMfolozi Game Reserve. The mine is located near Ntshangase’s home in Ophondweni in the KwaZulu-Natal province, South Africa. It is the largest African producer of anthracite, which is used in steel production. The Mpukunyoni community has traditionally depended on herding and agriculture, but the Somkhele Coal Mine and the Hluhluwe-iMfolozi game park are currently the biggest employers of the community.

Health concerns related to the mine have been raised by the local community, including respiratory-related issues linked to coal dust; the pollution of drinking water; and dried up water sources. Cultural concerns were also lodged as ancestral graves where exhumed and moved elsewhere without proper identification. Additionally, the Hluhluwe-iMfolozi Game Reserve plays a significant role in the environmental conservation efforts around the white rhino, and there are fears from the reserve that the expansion of the Somkhele mine close to its border would intensify poaching.

Ntshangase was part of a legal dispute that opposed the expansion of the Somkhele mine. With the assistance of attorneys for climate change and environmental justice from the non-profit environmental law clinic ALL RISE, MCEJO instituted legal action against Tendele Coal Mining to cease its activity in the Somkhele mine until it had amended its environmental management plan and obtained relevant permits for waste management and the removal of protected plants in the area. The Pietermaritzburg High Court held that Tendele was not required to have environmental authorisation for its mining rights. When the case was appealed, the Supreme Court of Appeals dismissed the case on the basis that MCEJO and ALL RISE were not specifying the specific activities undertaken by Tendele that required environmental authorisation.

==== Rising tensions ====
The local community had been split regarding the mine's expansion, leading to rising tensions. Some had been campaigning to preserve their rural livelihoods and the environment, but other community members needed work from the mine and supported expansion. Some Mpukunyoni locals protested proposed relocations related to Tendele’s expansion, citing inadequate public consultation prior to the awarding of mining rights to the company. Locals near the mine had been subject to intimidation and threats of violence in the months prior to Ntshangase's murder. Families who refused to be relocate from their ancestral lands were reportedly shot at. In April 2020, 19 bullets were shot at the home of another anti-mining activist, Tholakele Mthethwa.

Tendele mines initially attempted to reach an agreement with MCEJO to withdraw the court cases against the company, to which some MCEJO members agreed. Ntshangase had reportedly declined to sign an agreement and refused the company's bribe. She reportedly said, “I refused to sign. I cannot sell out my people. And if need be, I will die for my people.”

== Death ==
At around 6:30pm on 22 October 2020, according to local police, three men entered Ntshangase’s home in Ophondweni, and shot her dead (six times) a few meters away from her thirteen-year-old grandson and two of his friends (at ages eight and ten). She was 63 years old and had been cutting onions for dinner at the time.

Ntshangase’s death was part of a rising trend of murdered environmental activists, as a record number were killed around the world in both 2019 and 2020, according to Global Witness reports. These deaths relate to environmental activists’ challenges to fossil fuel industries, as well as to local community divisions around how environmental advocacy can impact their livelihoods in the absence of a just transition.

=== International response ===
Ntshangase's death has been condemned as murder by multiple environmental and humanitarian organizations. For example, on October 27, 2020, environmental organization groundWork sent a letter to various South African authorities requesting an immediate investigation into her death, which was supported by international network of environmental organizations Friends of the Earth. Human Rights Watch wrote a similar letter.
