= Dorothy Stang =

American-Brazilian Religious Sister, educator and social activist (murdered 2005)

Sister Dorothy Stang SNDdeN
- Province: São Luís do Maranhão
- Diocese: Diocese of Coroatá

Personal details
- Born: Dorothy Mae Stang; June 7, 1931 Dayton, Ohio, United States
- Died: February 12, 2005 (aged 73) Anapu, Pará, Brazil
- Denomination: Catholicism
- Education: Notre Dame de Namur University

Dorothy Mae Stang, SNDdeN (June 7, 1931 – February 12, 2005) was an American-born Brazilian Catholic religious sister and missionary. She was murdered in Anapu, Pará, in the Amazon basin in 2005. Stang had been outspoken in her efforts on behalf of the poor and the environment and had previously received death threats from loggers and landowners. She was a member of the Sisters of Notre Dame de Namur.

== Life ==
Born Dorothy Mae Stang on June 7, 1931, in Dayton, Ohio, later a naturalized Brazilian citizen, she entered the Sisters of Notre Dame de Namur in 1948 and professed final vows in 1956. From 1951 to 1966, she taught elementary school classes at St. Victor School in Calumet City, Illinois, St. Alexander School in Villa Park, Illinois, and Most Holy Trinity School in Phoenix, Arizona. During this time she earned a degree in education at what later became Notre Dame de Namur University.

Stang began her ministry in Brazil in 1966, in Coroatá, Maranhão. Initially she helped to establish pastoral centers scattered among the isolated communities of the region, where she instructed the local populations in the Catholic faith. Growing closer to the people she served, she began to know the threats posed to both them and the local environment. She eventually dedicated her life to defending the Brazilian rainforest from depletion by commercial agriculture.

Stang started to serve as an advocate for the rural poor beginning in the early 1970s, helping peasants to make a living by farming small plots and extracting forest products without deforestation. She also sought to protect peasants from criminal gangs working on behalf of ranchers who were after their land. Dot, as she was called by her family, friends and most locals in Brazil, is often pictured wearing a T-shirt with the slogan, "A Morte da floresta é o fim da nossa vida" which is Portuguese for "The Death of the Forest is the End of Our Lives".

I don't want to flee, nor do I want to abandon the battle of these farmers who live without any protection in the forest. They have the sacrosanct right to aspire to a better life on land where they can live and work with dignity while respecting the environment.

== Death ==
On the morning of February 12, 2005, Stang woke up early to walk to a community meeting to speak about the rights for the Amazon. Ciero, a farmer Stang invited to the meeting, was going to be late. Ciero was a couple of minutes behind Stang, but he was able to see her and hid from the two armed men who followed her. She progressed on and was blocked by the two men, Clodoaldo Carlos Batista and Raifran das Neves Sales, who worked in a livestock company. They asked if she had any weapons, and she claimed that the only weapon would be her Bible. She then read a passage from the Beatitudes, "Blessed are the poor in spirit ..." She continued a couple of steps but was suddenly stopped when Ciero called her "sister", as she was held at gunpoint by Raifran. When Clodoaldo approved of discharging at Stang, Raifran fired a round at Stang's abdomen. She fell face down on the ground. Raifran fired another round into Stang's back, then fired all four remaining rounds into her head, killing her. She was 73 years old.

== Investigation and trials ==
The US Attorney's Office, Transnational Crime Unit, in Washington, DC, pursued an indictment of the four people (three in custody, one at large) under Title 18, USC 2332, a statute on international homicide. The key elements of this statute require 1) the victim be a US citizen, 2) that the murder takes place outside the US, and 3) that the murder was carried out to influence, pressure, or coerce a government or civilian group. Stang's murder met all the key elements.

In June 2005, two men were charged with conspiracy to murder an American outside the United States in connection with her death. These men, Rayfran das Neves Sales and Clodoaldo Carlos Batista, were convicted on December 10, 2005.

On May 15, 2007, a court in the city of Belém sentenced Vitalmiro Bastos de Moura, aged 36, to the maximum term of 30 years in prison for paying gunmen to shoot Stang. Stang's brother David, who was at the trial, said: "justice was done." In a second trial, Moura was acquitted of all charges, because the gunman, Rayfran das Neves Sales, declared in court to have killed Dorothy Stang for personal motivation. The prosecution appealed, however, and Moura was found guilty, and re-sentenced to 30 years in prison, on April 12, 2010.

Rayfran das Neves Sales was retried on October 22, 2007. He was again found guilty, and a judge in Belém sentenced him to 27 years in prison–the same punishment as in the first trial in 2005. Prosecutors said Moura had ordered Stang's death because she had sent letters to the local authorities accusing Moura of setting illegal fires to clear land, which led to his receiving a substantial fine. At a third trial, on May 6, 2008, Rayfran das Neves Sales was sentenced to 28 years in prison.

Regivaldo Pereira Galvão, a rancher suspected of ordering the killing, was arrested in December 2008 and was to be charged with the murder. He had been arrested previously for the murder but released.

On April 7, 2009, the Court of Justice, in Pará, decided to void the third trial. The same court decided to put Vitalmiro Bastos de Moura back in jail but Moura's lawyer appealed that decision. A new trial was to be scheduled. On April 22, 2009, Superior Court of Justice of Brazil set Vitalmiro Moura free until a final decision about his request of Habeas corpus.

Roniery Lopes, a witness in the trial of Regivaldo Galvão for fraud, was shot in November 2009, just before he was to testify.

On February 4, 2010, Superior Court of Justice revoked Vitalmiro Moura's habeas corpus. Moura was arrested on February 7, after surrendering voluntarily to police. On April 12, 2010, he was convicted again by a jury and sentenced to 30 years in prison.

On May 1, 2010, Regivaldo Galvão was also convicted of having ordered the murder. He was sentenced to 30 years in prison.

On August 21, 2012, the Brazilian Supreme Court conceded a Habeas Corpus to Regivaldo Galvão. The defense attorney claims that the jury decided to condemn Reginaldo before all the legal recourses available to the defendant were exhausted. Regivaldo Galvão was freed the following day.

On May 15, 2013, Brazil's Supreme Court overturned the conviction of Vitalmiro Moura. On September 19, 2013, Moura was convicted of the murder for a fourth time and sentenced to 30 years in prison by a court in Pará State.

In July 2013, das Neves Sales gained early release from prison. On September 20, 2014, Neves Sales was arrested again facing accusations of having killed a young man and woman with whom he had a drug deal. They supplied 50 kilograms of cocaine from Bolivia, but instead of paying them for the consignment, Sales fatally shot them.

== Documentary ==
On March 2, U.S. Ambassador John Danilovich met with Dorothy Stang's brother David Stang, Daniel Junge (who was traveling with Stang to film a documentary), and Sister Mary Ellis McCabe (a member of Dorothy's religious congregation who was stationed in Ceará, Brazil). Stang and Junge were in Brasília to meet with Minister of Justice Marcio Thomaz Bastos after visiting the site of Dorothy's murder in Para state. Stang thanked the Ambassador for the Embassy's support and said that he was pleased with the Brazilian federal government's reaction. He was very critical, however, of Para state authorities for failing to protect his sister and for failing to offer their condolences during his visit.

In 2008, the American filmmaker Daniel Junge released a documentary titled They Killed Sister Dorothy. The film is narrated by Martin Sheen in the version in English and by Wagner Moura in the version in Portuguese. The film received the Audience Award and the Competition Award at the 2008 South by Southwest Festival, where it had its worldwide première.

== Opera ==
In 2009, Evan Mack composed an opera based on the life of Sr. Dorothy Stang. Angel of the Amazon depicts her life's work, her devotion to her mission with Brazilian peasant farmers, and the events that sent her on a path of martyrdom. Encompass New Opera Theatre developed the opera in 2010.

== Other notable mentions ==
A brief overview of the circumstances and murder of Sister Dorothy Stang is discussed in the movie Cowspiracy (2014).

A center for social justice activism at Notre Dame de Namur University is named for her.

In 2021, a species of owl discovered in the Amazon rainforest was named Megascops stangiae after sister Stang.

Sister Dorothy Stang, SNDdeN, is the first North American woman whose relics are included in the Shrine of Modern Martyrs at the Basilica of St. Bartholomew on Tiber Island in Rome.

In 2025, Pope Leo XIV presided over a Holy Year evening prayer service of multiple denominations, at the Basilica of St. Paul Outside the Walls, to honor hundreds of Christians who have been killed for their faith in the 21st century. Sister Stang was cited and mentioned during this prayer service.

== Posthumous United Nations Human Rights Prize ==
Dorothy Stang received the United Nations Human Rights Prize posthumously on December 10, 2008.

== See also ==
- Chico Mendes
- Environment of Brazil
- Indigenous people in Brazil
- José Cláudio Ribeiro da Silva
- Vicente Canas
- Wilson Pinheiro

== Notes ==
1. reference to an Article in the January 2007 issue of National Geographic
2. Article in the July/August 2005 issue of Maryknoll (maryknoll.org)
