= María Enriqueta Matute =

María Enriqueta Matute (1942 – 25 August 2013) was an environmental and indigenous rights activist in Honduras. She was part of the Tolupán indigenous people. She participated in peaceful protests against illegal mining and logging activity on indigenous land.

On 25 August 2013, Matute was killed along with two other activists as they participated in a sit-in to block a road. The sit-in had been in place since 14 August, involving several indigenous communities. About 150 activists of the San Francisco de Locomapa tribe blocked the main road, protesting antimony mining on their lands. In the evening, two men approached the group and opened fire, killing Armando Fúnez Medina and Ricardo Soto Fúnez. Matute fled to her home, though was followed by the gunmen and fatally shot. All three victims were members of Movimiento Amplio por la Dignidad y la Justicia (Broad Movement for Dignity and Justice), or MADJ. The shooters were later identified as Selvin Matute and Carlos Matute (no relation), who were hired by the Bella Vista Mining Company.

== Aftermath ==
Eighteen members of MADJ fled the area after the massacre. In December 2013, the Inter-American Commission on Human Rights ordered protective measures for the indigenous activists, which were signed by the government of Honduras.
