= Enawene Nawe =

Indigenous people of Brazil

Enawenê-Nawê
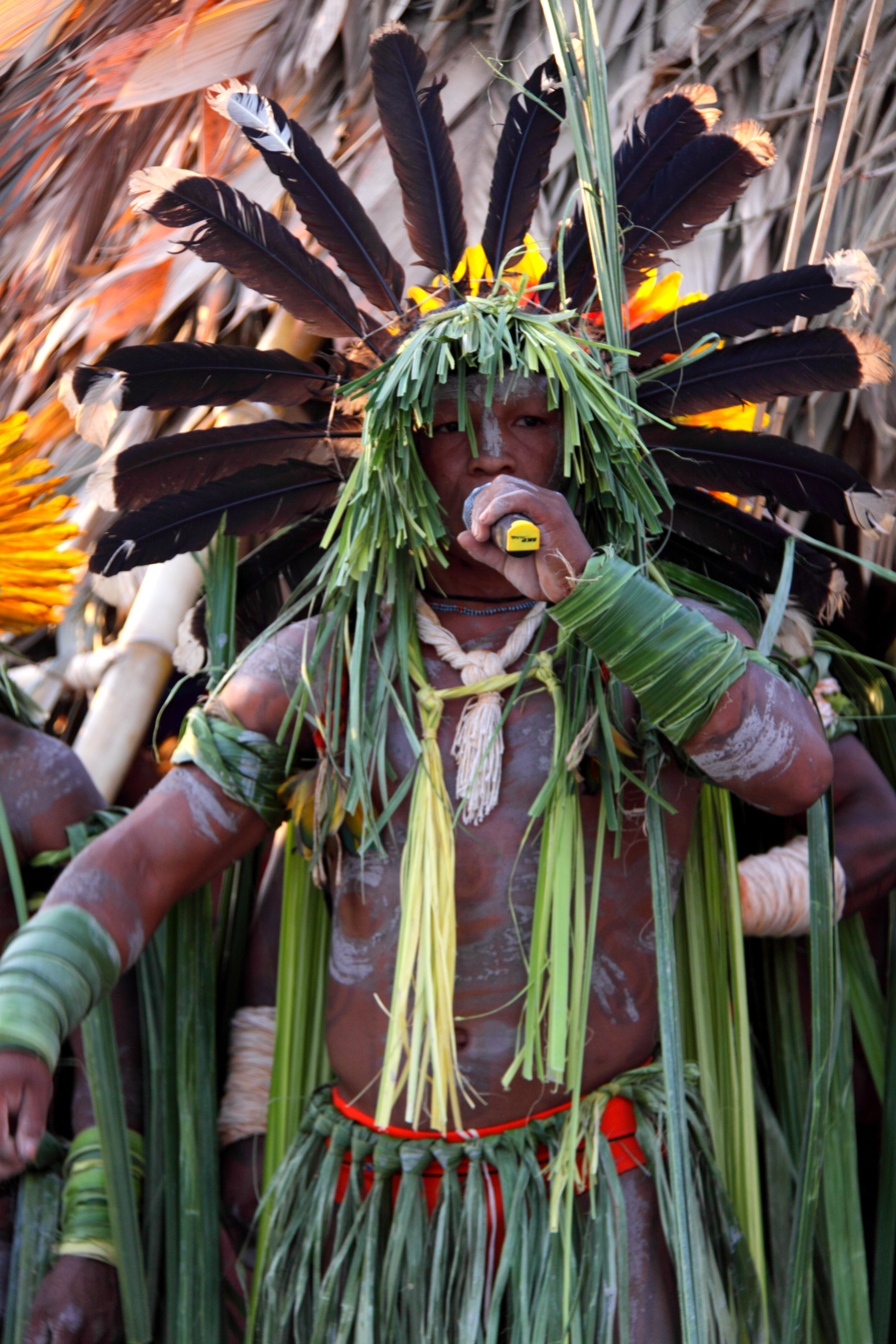
- Enawene Nawe man from Mato Grosso

Total population
- 737 (2014)

Regions with significant populations
- Brazil (Mato Grosso)

Languages
- Enawené-Nawé

Religion
- Traditional tribal religion

The Enawenê-Nawê are an Indigenous people of Brazil in the Mato Grosso state. They live in a large village near the Iquê River in the Enawenê Nawê Indigenous Land. They practice agriculture, fishing, and gathering and do not hunt or eat red meat.

The Enawene Nawe are a relatively isolated people who were first contacted in 1974 by Vicente Cañas. They numbered 566 in 2012, up from 320 in 2000. In 2014 their number grew to 737.

== Name ==
The Enawené-Nawé are also known as the Enawenê-nawê, Eneuene-Mare or Salumã people. They are distinct from the Salumá people in Pará.

== Language ==
The Enawené-Nawé language is a Central Maipuran language, part of the Arawakan language family.

== Current issues ==
These people are endangered by corporations that encroach on their land and pollute the rivers from which they obtain their source of food. Many dams have been built or are under construction on the Juruena river that pollute the water and kill many of the fish. Without fish, there is no food for the Enawene Nawe people, as they eat no red meat. Many people believe it is Blairo Maggi, a politician and corporation executive, who wants these dams. He has plans to build 77 dams on the river. Constitutionally, Brazil's tribes are supposed to receive full protection from the federal government, but like its predecessors, the current government has frequently ceded to pressure from Brazilian and international agribusiness. The people rely on support from NGOs like Survival International. Also, they believe the nearby land is home to many important spirits, but the land is being destroyed by ranchers, who continue to build dams and who have threatened violence if the members of the tribe perform their rites, such as Yaokwa, their ritual for the maintenance of social and cosmic order.
