= Wayne Lotter =

South African wildlife conservationist (1965–2017)

- Born: 4 December 1965; Benoni, South Africa
- Died: 16 August 2017 (aged 51); Dar es Salaam, Tanzania
- Occupation: Conservationist
- Years active: 1987–2017

Wayne Lotter (4 December 1965 – 16 August 2017) was a South African wildlife conservationist. Lotter was one of the co-founders of the PAMS Foundation, a non profit conservation organisation based in Tanzania. Lotter also previously served as Vice President of the International Ranger Federation.

== Biography ==
Having obtained a master's degree in nature conservation in the 1990s, Lotter began working in the non-profit and government wildlife protection sectors. He worked initially as a ranger in South Africa. He was a co-founder of the PAMS Foundation which trained thousands of young Africans in conservation. Lotter was involved in funding the National and Transnational Serious Crimes Investigation Unit in Tanzania which had successfully pursued a number of high-profile ivory traffickers.

In a 2015 interview with Newsweek Lotter was described as "enthusiastic and charismatic".

Lotter was asked to take part in the 2016 Netflix documentary The Ivory Game but requested that rangers employed by the foundation be featured instead.

== Death ==
Lotter, who had regularly received death threats, was shot dead on Wednesday, 16 August 2017, while travelling in a taxi in Dar es Salaam, Tanzania. His death attracted international attention, with an obituary being published in The Times of London and The Economist. Jane Goodall, a British primatologist, ethologist, anthropologist, and UN Messenger of Peace paid tribute to Lotter, whom she described as a "hero of mine" and "courageous". Tributes were also paid by other wildlife protection organisations. Prince William, Duke of Cambridge also condemned the "violent and apparently targeted murder" of Lotter and expressed his "deepest condolences to Wayne's family and all those at PAMS Foundation for this senseless loss."

== See also ==
- Esmond Bradley Martin, fought against the illegal trade of rhinoceros horns, also murdered
