= Tendele Coal =

The Tendele Coal is a coal mining operation in South Africa principally known for its Somkhele Coal Mine in KwaZulu-Natal province. The open cast coal mine was first opened in 2007, and largely produces metallurgical coal that is exported out of Richards Bay.

Tendele is largely owned by Petmin, which in turn is owned by Capital Works Private Equity after delisting from the Johannesburg Stock Exchange in 2017.

== Local impacts ==
The mine has been connected to several human rights abuses. A 2017 case against the mine claimed that it breached environmental and other laws in its operations, but was subsequently dismissed.

The death of environmental defender, Fikile Ntshangase was connected to the mine's expansion. Fikile Ntshangase was part of the local community group, Mfolozi Community Environmental Justice Organisation, which was protesting the environmental impacts of the mine.

The mine also produces water and air pollution that hurts local communities.
