= Esmond Bradley Martin =

American conservationist (1941–2018)

Esmond Bradley Martin FRGS
- Born: April 17, 1941; New York City, United States
- Died: February 4, 2018 (aged 76); Nairobi, Kenya
- Cause of death: Stabbing
- Education: Brooks School (Class of 1959) University of Arizona - Bachelor of Science (1964) University of Liverpool - Master of Arts (1966) University of Liverpool - Doctor of Philosophy (1970)
- Alma mater: Brooks School University of Arizona University of Liverpool
- Occupation: Conservationist

Esmond Bradley Martin (17 April 1941 – 4 February 2018) was an American conservationist who fought for both the preservation of elephants against the illegal ivory trade, and for the rhinoceros against the illegal trade of rhinoceros horns. A trained geographer, Martin was considered a world-renowned expert in the ivory trade and rhinoceros horn trade. He had been a special envoy of the United Nations for the conservation of rhinoceros. Militant for a reduction in the demand for ivory to dry up the market, he participated notably in the stop of rhinoceros horn trade to China in 1993 and ivory in 2017.

Martin was found dead on 4 February 2018 with a stab wound to his neck in Nairobi, Kenya, aged 76.

== Life and career ==
Esmond was born in New York City on April 17, 1941. He was the great-grandson of 19th century steel magnate Henry Phipps. Martin attended Brooks School, in North Andover, MA and graduated in 1959. He then earned a bachelor of science degree in agricultural economics, and followed by a master's degree, from the University of Arizona in 1964. He then defended a PhD from the University of Liverpool completed in 1970, with research on the development of Malindi, a town now in Kenya, from the Portuguese period onwards.

In the mid-1970s, Martin and his wife, Chryssee Martin, settled in Nairobi, Kenya, and began studying and publishing books, researching a wide variety of historical and anthropological subjects.

In 1979, Martin discovered his true calling: he was asked by the World Wildlife Fund and the International Union for Conservation of Nature and Natural Resources if you could help them quantify the traffic in elephant ivory. His first investigation of the ivory trade appeared in December 1979. The rest of his career was dedicated to animal conservation research with an emphasis on ivory and rhino horn.

== Ivory Trade Research ==
From the late 1970s until 2018, Martin traveled extensively took great risk to gather data surrounding the ivory trade. He would often go deep undercover, meticulously documenting and photographing illegal sales of ivory and rhino horn, all in secret to the surrounding merchants. Sharply dressed, Martin would hide in plain sight as an affluent shopper for illicit ivory and rhino horn, and went undercover to gain information about the illegal wildlife trade. Through this persona, he was able to gain intel surrounding the practices of these traders.

Martin served as the United Nations special envoy for rhino conservation.

In the 1990s he spent a year undercover posing as an ivory dealer, collecting data on how the price of ivory grew from $20 per kilogram that the poachers received, to almost $600 per kilogram in China at the end of the trade line. Between that is a dense line of middlemen earning major profits off of extinction. In the undercover process, Martin exposed an Italian diplomat (who smuggled ivory by hiding it in dog meat) and an Indonesian ambassador among other high ranking officials corruptly involved in the trade.

An anecdotal achievement by Martin was debunking the myth that rhino horn was used by Asian buyers for sexual purposes, which is incorrect. Rather, it was primary used for traditional medicine such as lowering fever, making dagger handles in Yemen, and more recently, as a party drug when mixed with cocaine. While it is still a widespread myth that rhino horn has health benefits, the reality is that rhino horn is made of keratin, the same material of fingernails, and has no properties other than as a placebo effect or a symbol of buying power.

Martin’s research primarily focused on curbing the demand of these products. He was instrumental in stopping the rhinoceros horn trade in China in 1993, and then the ivory trade in China in 2017. While other leaders were more tepid about making these items illegal, Martin stood for a total ban of wildlife products as the solution for saving these animals, despite their still drastically decreasing numbers.

Other contributions Martin made to this field included: highlighting increased demand for rhino horn in Yemen in 2008, showing the drop in Japanese demand for ivory in 2010, detailing a burgeoning ivory trade in Hong Kong in 2011, and explaining the reduction in rhino poaching in Nepal in 2013. His final published research documented how Laos’s and Vietnam’s ivory markets are booming.

== Death ==
On February 4, 2018, Martin was found dead with a stab wound to his neck at his home in Nairobi. He was 76 years old. He was survived by his wife and longtime research partner Chryssee Martin. Martin had recently returned from a trip to Myanmar and was writing a report on his findings about ivory trafficking there. Local police reports deemed this murder a “robbery gone wrong.” However, nothing was stolen. Martin’s research actively threatened the illicit organizations that profited from wildlife trafficking; therefore his effective muckraking likely made him a target to these criminal organizations, though the case is not closed as of April 2019.

=== Public reaction ===
Conservationist and WildlifeDirect CEO Dr. Paula Kahumbu tweeted:

"It is with deep shock & horror that we learn this morning of the death of long time conservationist, Esmond Bradley Martin, whom police say died in suspicious circumstances at his home in Karen, Nairobi. Esmond led investigations into ivory & rhino horn trafficking. Esmond was at the forefront of exposing the scale of ivory markets in USA, Congo, Nigeria, Angola, China, Hong Kong, Vietnam, Laos and recently Myanmar. He always collaborated with Save the Elephants and worked with many of us generously sharing his findings & views. Esmond was a global authority on ivory and rhino horn trafficking. We send our deepest condolences to his wife. RIP Esmond, pachyderms have lost a great [champion].

== Legacy ==
In May 2019, Brooks School posthumously awarded Martin the Distinguished Brooksian Award, in conjunction with what would have been his 60th high school reunion. Martin's former roommate Tony Milbank accepted the award on his behalf.

Martin left a financial endowment to the London based Royal Geographical Society (RGS), of which he was a life Fellow, with the request that this should fund an annual prize in his name. The RGS launched the Esmond B. Martin RGS Prize in 2023, with up to two prizes awarded every year to individuals. The prize is intended to recognise outstanding achievement in the field of geographical research, especially wildlife conservation and environmental research. The winner of the inaugural 2023 prize was Dr. Paula Kahumbu, who knew Martin personally, and worked with him.

== Publications ==
Martin was extensively involved in publishing academic writings, below is an incomplete list of Martin's work.

=== Books ===
- Quest for the Past: An Historical Guide to Lamu, Kenya 1970
- The History of Malindi: A Geographical Analysis of an East African Coastal Town from the Portuguese period to the present, 1973
  Zanzibar: Tradition and Revolution, 1978
- Oman: A Seafaring Nation, 1979
- Cargoes of the East: The Ports, Trade, and Culture of the Arabian Seas and Western Indian Ocean, 1978 (co-authored with his wife, Chryssee Martin)
- The International Trade in Rhinoceros Products, 1979
- Run Rhino Run, 1983 (co-authored with Chryssee Martin)
- Rhino Exploitation: The Trade in Rhino Products in India, Indonesia, Malaysia, Burma, Japan, and South Korea (1983), World Wildlife Fund
- The Japanese Ivory Industry (1985)

=== Scientific Reports ===
==== Ivory and Rhino Horn Related Reports ====
- Religion, Royalty, and Rhino Conservation in Nepal (1985)
- On A Knife’s Edge: Rhinoceros Horn Trade in Yemen (1997)
- The Ivory Markets of Africa (2000) (co-authored with Daniel Stiles, published by Save the Elephants)
- The Ivory Markets of East Asia (2003) (co-authored with Daniel Stiles)
- The Ivory Markets of Europe (2005) (co-authored with Daniel Stiles)
- No Oasis: The Egyptian Ivory Trade in 2005 (2005) (co-authored with Tom Milliken)
- Ivory Markets in the USA (2008) (co-authored with Daniel Stiles)
- The Ivory Dynasty: A report on the soaring demand for elephant and mammoth ivory in Southern China (2010) (co-authored with Lucy Vigne)
- Hong Kong’s Ivory: More Items for sale than any other city in the world (2015) (co-authored with Lucy Vigne)
- Vietnam’s illegal Ivory trade threatens Africa’s Elephants (2016) (co-authored with Lucy Vigne)
- The Ivory Trade of Laos: Now the Fastest Growing in the World (2017) (co-authored with Lucy Vigne)
- Decline in the Legal Ivory Trade in China in Anticipation of a Ban (2017) (co-authored with Lucy Vigne)

==== Non-Ivory Related Reports ====
- A Quantitative Assessment of the Arab Slave Trade of East Africa (1977)
- New War in South East Asia (1994) (co-authored with Daniel Stiles, published by Swara Magazine)

== See also ==
- Wayne Lotter, South African wildlife conservationist involved in stopping ivory traffickers, also murdered
