= Wilson Pinheiro =

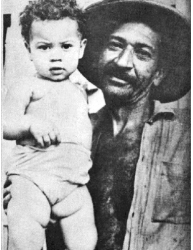
Wilson Souza Pinheiro

Wilson Pinheiro (died in 1980) was the president of the Brasiléia Rural Workers Union in the State of Acre in Brazil. He helped lead the fight against ranchers who were destroying the Amazon rainforest. Pinheiro was committed to defend the Amazon and was assassinated on July 21, 1980. He was a colleague of Chico Mendes, the president of the Xapuri Rural Workers Union, who similarly lost his life defending the Amazon.

== History ==
Pinheiro grew up in Acre, Brazil, a rubber-producing region in the Amazon River Basin. During the 1960s, rubber prices had collapsed to the point that many landowners were beginning to sell their land to cattle ranchers. Traditional rubber tappers were being removed from homes and evicted from their lands.

In the 1970s, together with Chico Mendes, he organized the rubber tappers of the forest. The rubber tappers would stage mass demonstrations blocking roads. In addition, they would take over logging sites by disarming guards and convincing the loggers not to continue. Frequently, they were very successful at stopping logging projects, despite resistance from the ranchers.

== Individual activism ==
Wilson Pinheiro was a mentor of Chico Mendes and together they worked in the Brasiléia Rural Workers Union. In the early 1970s, Pinheiro became a member of the Confederation of Agricultural Workers, supported by the Catholic Church, through which he and Mendes began to set up human blockades, a technique known in Portuguese as the empate. The first empate took place in March 1976 in a rubber estate near Brasileia, when 60 men spent three days in trenches in order to stop logging. In the words of Chico Mendes, "They put themselves in front of the chain saws, and the workmen retreated. They were afraid. There was an enormous pressure afterward from the authorities, but from there on, it proved to be the only way." These protests were nonviolent, and some claim that they had limited success. They did, however, attract international attention to the plight of the rubber tappers. Unfortunately, the ranchers responded very violently. They even used the local police to threaten, torture, and kill many of union members.

== Assassination ==
On the night of July 21, 1980, Wilson Pinheiro was murdered inside of the offices of the Rural Workers Union of Brasiléia. He was watching a television program, a police thriller, when he was shot to death by a gunman hired by local ranchers who opposed his union. According to Augusta Dwyer's book Into the Amazon: Chico Mendes and the Struggle for the Rainforest, the gunman waited for the sound of shots from the show Pinheiro was watching to begin shooting. While 1,500 rubber tappers and their families came to his funeral, the death of Wilson Pinheiro did not make international headlines. It was, however, used very effectively by Chico Mendes as an example during his campaign to end the destruction of the Amazon Rainforest. The death of Pinheiro also meant that the focus of struggle moved towards Xapuri, where Mendes was working.

== In cinema ==
Wilson Pinheiro was featured in the movie The Burning Season (in Portuguese, Amazônia em Chamas), directed by the filmmaker John Frankenheimer and based on the book of the same name by Andrew Revkin. Edward James Olmos was cast as Wilson Pinheiro in the movie. In total, the film won two Emmys and three Golden Globe Awards.

== See also ==
- Dorothy Stang
- Chico Mendes
- Vicente Canas
- José Cláudio Ribeiro da Silva
- Environment of Brazil
