= Nova Ipixuna =

Municipality in Pará, Brazil

Coordinates: 4.92083°S 49.0769°W

- Municipality
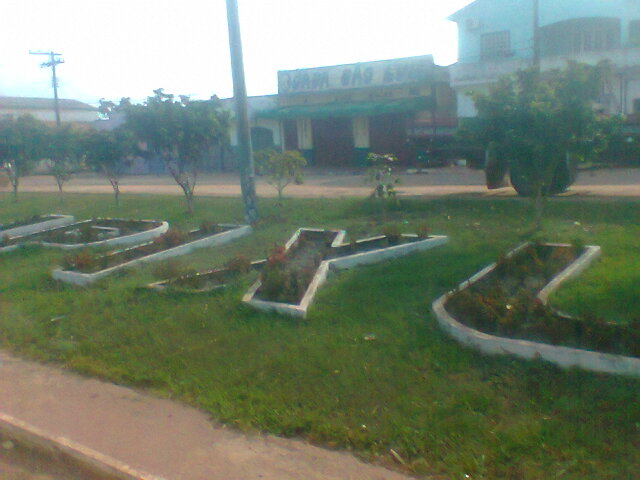

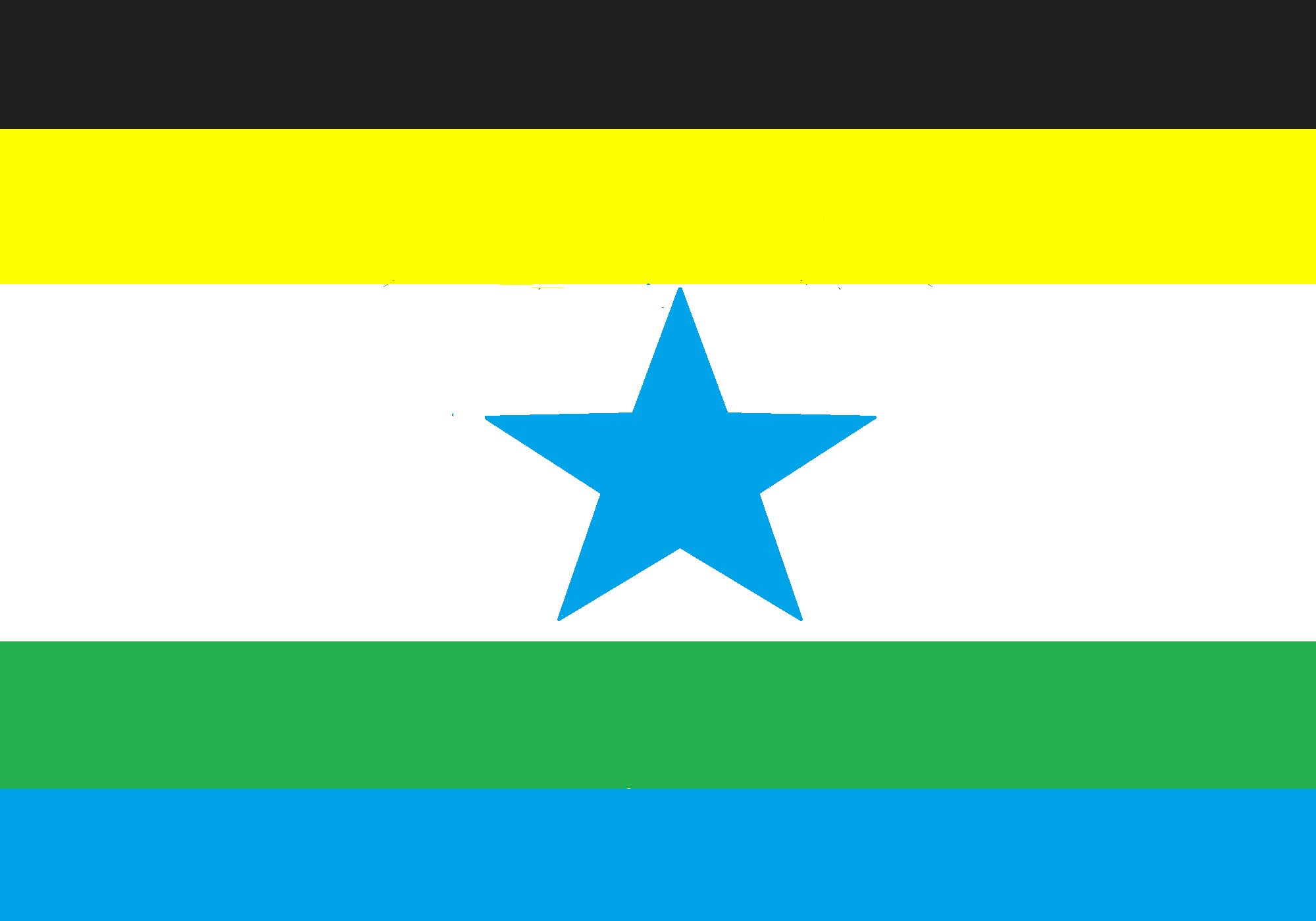
- Flag
- Interactive map of Nova Ipixuna
- Country: Brazil
- Region: Northern
- State: Pará
- Mesoregion: Sudeste Paraense

Population (2020)
  - Total: 16,854
- Time zone: UTC−3 (BRT)

Nova Ipixuna is a municipality in the state of Pará in the North Region of Brazil. The environmental campaigner Claudelice Silva dos Santos, a 2019 Sakharov Prize nominee, comes from Nova Ipixuna.

== See also ==
- List of municipalities in Pará
