= José Cláudio da Silva =

- Born: José Cláudio Ribeiro da Silva; January 22, 1957
- Died: May 24, 2011 (aged 54); Brazil
- Cause of death: Murder
- Other name: Zé Cláudio
- Occupations: conservationist and environmentalist
- Spouse: Maria do Espírito Santo
- Children: 3
- Relatives: Claudelice Silva dos Santos (sister)

José Cláudio Ribeiro da Silva (January 22, 1957 – May 24, 2011) was a Brazilian conservationist and environmentalist who campaigned against logging and clearcutting of trees in the Amazon rainforest.

== Biography ==
Ribeiro da Silva, who was also known by the nickname Zé Cláudio, campaigned against illegal logging, deforestation and ranchers. He originally worked as a community leader at a forest reserve that produced sustainable rainforest products, such as oils and nuts. He became an anti-logging activist as illegal loggers began to encroach further into untouched areas of Pará, his largely forested home state in northern Brazil. He and his wife, Maria do Espírito Santo, had received death threats for his activism in favor of the preservation of Brazil's rainforest. In 2008, a report issued by a group of Brazilian human rights groups listed Ribeiro da Silva one of a dozen activists based in the Amazon to be "considered at risk" of harm or assassination by opponents.

In November 2010, da Silva was invited to speak at TED conference. He told the TED audience that his particular region of Pará once had 85% coverage of native Amazonian plants. However, since the arrival of loggers, the region's plant biodiversity had shrunk to just 20% native Amazonian plant life. Da Silva also acknowledged the death threats that he had received, "I will protect the forest at all costs. That is why I could get a bullet in my head at any moment — because I denounce the loggers and charcoal producers."

== Death ==
José Cláudio Ribeiro da Silva, aged 52, and his wife, Maria do Espírito Santo, aged 51, were shot and killed in an ambush attack on May 24, 2011. The attack occurred at a settlement called Maçaranduba 2, which is located near their home in Nova Ipixuna, Pará. José Cláudio Ribeiro da Silva had been refused police protection by local authorities, according to reports by the Diário do Pará and The Guardian. Da Silva murder brought comparisons with the killings of environmentalist Chico Mendes in 1988 and American nun Dorothy Stang in 2005.

Da Silva was survived by his adopted sixteen-year-old son and two children from a previous marriage.

== Aftermath ==
Two other environmental activist were also killed soon after Da Silva - Eremilton Pereira dos Santos, a farmer who was killed in the same area of Pará, and Adelino Ramos, a farmer and leader of the Corumbiara Peasant Movement in Rondônia, who was shot while selling vegetables on May 27, 2011. The Brazilian government pledged to protect Amazonian activists in an emergency cabinet meeting held on May 31, 2011, to deal with the crisis.

At the 2012 United Nations Forum on Forests held in New York, José and Maria were recognised posthumously by a special Forest Heroes Award.

== See also ==
- List of unsolved murders (2000–present)
