= Chico Mendes =

Brazilian trade union leader and environmentalist (1944–1988)

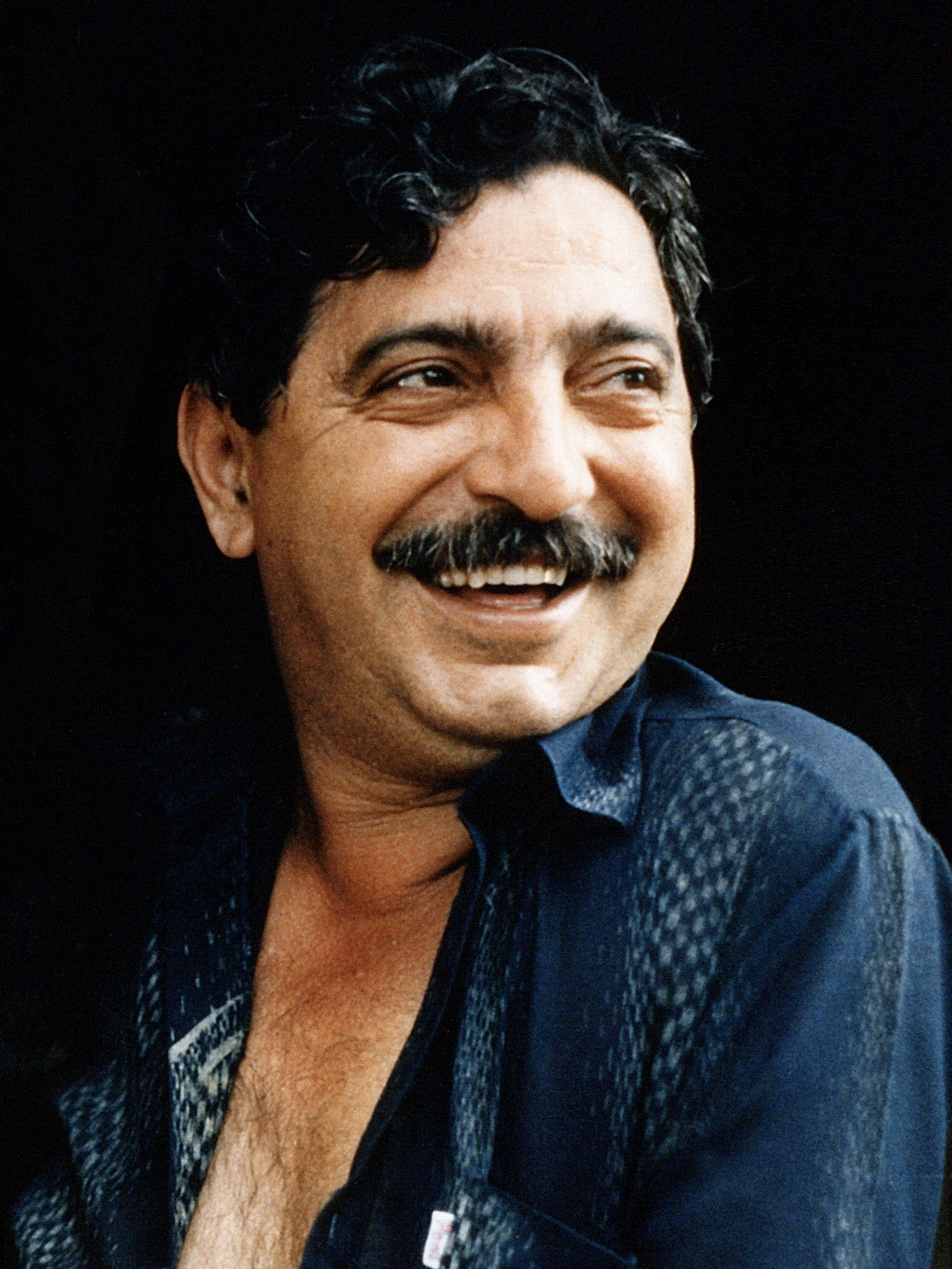
- Mendes in 1988
- Born: Francisco Alves Mendes Filho; 15 December 1944; Xapuri, Acre, Third Brazilian Republic
- Died: 22 December 1988 (aged 44); Xapuri, Acre, Brazil
- Cause of death: Gunshot wound
- Occupation: Social activist
- Spouse: Ilsamar Mendes
- Children: 3

Francisco Alves Mendes Filho (Note: Filho is the equivalent to "Junior".) (15 December 1944 – 22 December 1988), better known as Chico Mendes (Note: Chico is an abbreviative nickname for Francisco in Portuguese- and Spanish-speaking countries.) (Brazilian Portuguese: [ˈʃiku ˈmẽdʒis]), was a Brazilian rubber tapper, trade union leader, and environmentalist who fought to preserve the Amazon rainforest and advocated for the human rights of Brazilian peasants and Indigenous people. He was assassinated by a hired killer on 22 December 1988. The Chico Mendes Institute for Biodiversity Conservation (Instituto Chico Mendes de Conservação da Biodiversidade or ICMBio), a body under the jurisdiction of the Brazilian Ministry of the Environment, is named in his honour.

== Early life ==
Francisco "Chico" Alves Mendes Filho was born on 15 December 1944, in a rubber reserve called Seringal Bom Futuro, outside of Xapuri, a small town in the state of Acre. He was the son of a second-generation rubber tapper, Francisco Mendes, and his wife, Iracê. Chico was one of 17 siblings—only six of whom survived childhood.

At age nine, Chico began work as a rubber tapper alongside his father. At the time, the rubber industry across the nation was in decline, and land was frequently sold and burned for cattle pastures.

Rubber tappers additionally faced a severe lack of education. Schools were frequently forbidden on and near plantations, as the owners did not want the workers to be able to read and do arithmetic. For this reason, Mendes did not learn how to read until he was 18 years old, when he sought out help interpreting his bills.

Mendes was taught to read and write by a man named Euclides Fernando Távora, an activist turned rubber tapper. Most of his practice came from newspaper clippings on social and political issues within Brazil. These articles opened Mendes' eyes to the widespread injustices in society, adding to his dissatisfaction with the treatment of seringueiros.

After learning what he could from Távora, Mendes became a literacy teacher in hopes of educating his community. As Mendes' fellow workers became more aware of unjust treatment, they formed the Rural Workers’ Union and the more localized Xapuri Rubber Tappers Union. Both of these organizations worked through peaceful protest to stop the logging and burning of the rainforest that acted as their livelihood.

By the mid-1980s, Chico was known as both a radical unionist and an activist, though he also ran for several local political positions, such as state deputy and city councilor.

== Activism ==
At first I thought I was fighting to save rubber trees, then I thought I was fighting to save the Amazon rainforest. Now I realize I am fighting for humanity.

— Chico Mendes

To save the rainforest, Mendes and the rubber workers' union asked the government to set up reserves as they wanted people to use the forest without damaging it. They also used a very effective technique they called the 'empate', where rubber tappers blocked the way into rubber reserves, preventing their destruction.

The Rubber Tappers' Union was created in 1975 in the nearby town of Brasileia, with Wilson Pinheiro elected as the union's president and Mendes as its secretary. Mendes also played a central role in the creation of the National Council of Rubber Tappers in the mid-1980s. His group also had strong ties with the National Campaign for the Defence and Development of the Amazon and helped organize local Workers' Party support.

When the first meeting of this new union was held in 1985 in the capital Brasília, rubber tappers from all over the country came. The discussion expanded from the threats to their own livelihoods to the larger issues of road paving, cattle ranching, and deforestation. The meeting also caught the attention of the international environmentalist movement, giving the rubber tappers a larger audience for their grievances. The group embraced a larger alliance with environmentalism, rather than strict Marxism, in spite of the bourgeois associations of the former. Another result of these discussions was the coining of the concept and the term "extractive reserves". In November of that year, Adrian Cowell, an English filmmaker, filmed much of the proceedings of this meeting as part of a documentary he was making about Mendes, which aired in 1990.

Mendes believed that relying on rubber tapping alone was not sustainable, and that the seringueiros needed to develop more holistic, cooperative systems that used a variety of forest products, such as nuts, fruit, oil, and fibres; and that they needed to focus on building strong communities with quality education for their children.

In March 1987, the Environmental Defense Fund and National Wildlife Federation flew Mendes to Washington, D.C. in an attempt to convince the Inter-American Development Bank, World Bank, and U.S. Congress to support the creation of extractive reserves.

Mendes won several awards for his work, including the United Nations Environmental Program Global 500 Roll of Honor Award in 1987, and the National Wildlife Federation's National Conservation Achievement Award in 1988.

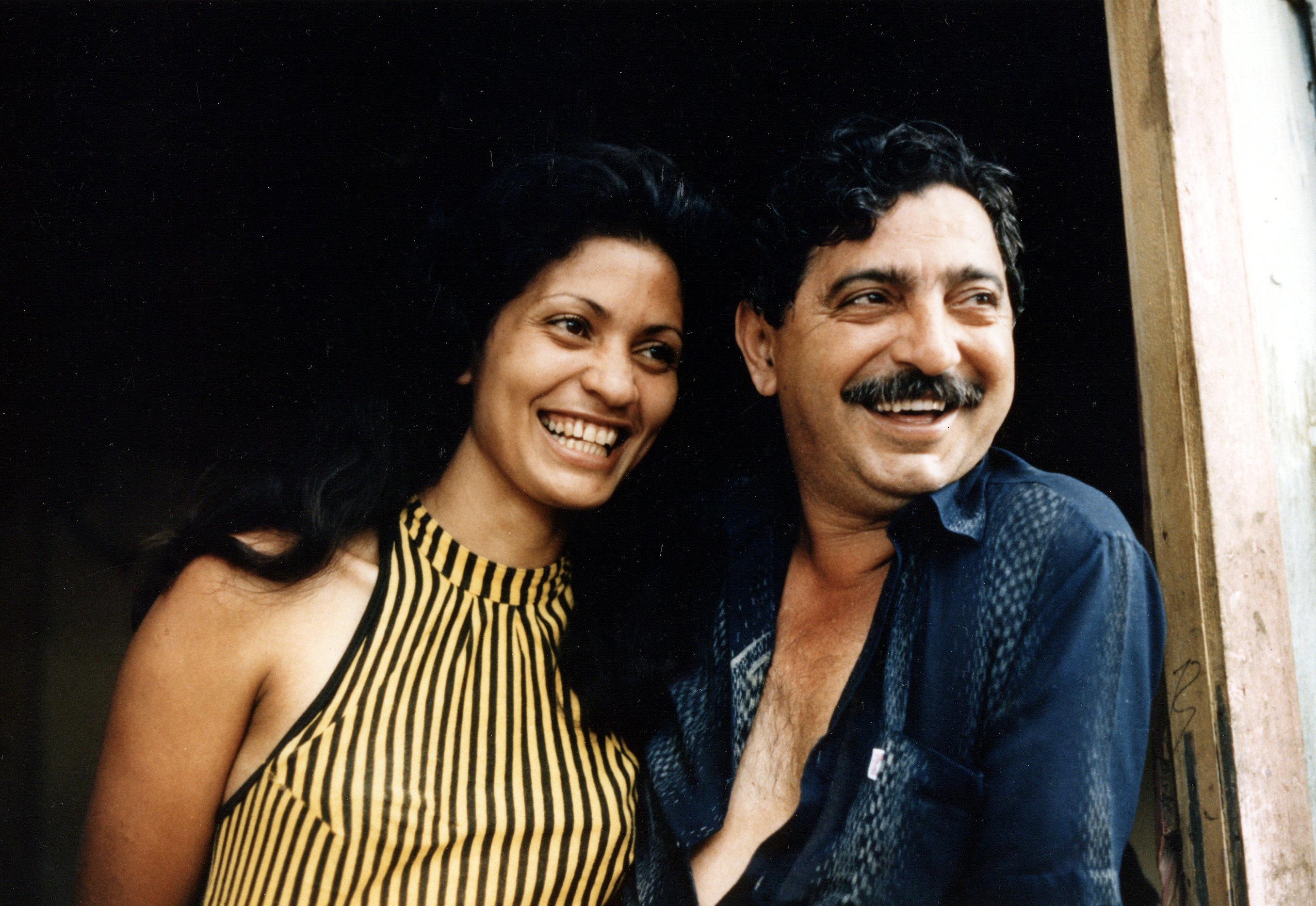
Chico Mendes and his wife Ilsamar at their home in Xapuri, State of Acre, Brazil, 1988.

In 1988, a man named Darly Alves da Silva bought part of a rubber reserve called Cachoeira, where relatives of Mendes lived, and which was affiliated with the local Rural Workers Union in Xapuri. While the sale of the section was disputed by the family of the vendor, who claimed he had no legal right to sell it, Silva tried to drive them off their land and increase his ranch holdings. The rubber tappers of Cachoeira stood firm and set up roadblocks to keep Silva out.

In 1988, Mendes launched a campaign to stop Silva from logging the area that its inhabitants wanted demarcated as an extractive reserve. He not only managed to stop the planned deforestation and create the reserve, but also gained a warrant for Darly's arrest for a murder committed in another state, Paraná. Mendes delivered the warrant to the federal police, but it was never acted upon.

== Assassination ==
Mendes had received death threats for years before his murder. However, in the months prior to his death, various pairs of gunmen hired by Silva observed Mendes from a square near his house and the town union hall.

On the evening of 22 December 1988, Mendes was shot and killed in his Xapuri home by Darci, the son of Darly Alves da Silva. The shooting took place exactly a week after Mendes' 44th birthday, when he predicted that he would "not live until Christmas".

Around his birthday, the gunmen who had been observing him disappeared completely. Their absence gave the community a sense of impending doom, as they had been constantly present since May of the same year. The timing of their disappearance led many to believe they had unsuccessfully attempted to kill Mendes on his birthday but had failed because of the numerous guests present at his house.

Mendes was the 90th rural activist murdered that year in Brazil. Many felt that although the trial was proceeding against Mendes' killers, the roles of the ranchers' union, the Rural Democratic Union, and the Brazilian Federal Police in his death were ignored.

In December 1990, Silva, his son Darci, and their employee Jerdeir Pereira were sentenced to 19 years in prison for their part in Mendes' assassination. In February 1992, they won a retrial, claiming that the prosecution's primary witness – Mendes' wife Ilsamar – was biased. However, the conviction was upheld, and they remained in prison. In 1993, they escaped from jail, along with seven other prisoners, by sawing through the bars of their prison window. All of them were recaptured, including Darly Jr., who served the remainder of his sentence with the other killers before returning to Xapuri.

On 28 February 2024, the son, Darci Alves Pereira, became the president of the Liberal Party in Medicilândia, a municipality in southwestern Pará. That same day, the party reported that he was removed from office. Valdemar Costa Neto, national president of the party, said he had "no knowledge" that it was Chico Mendes' murderer assuming Pará's party chapter presidency.

Mendes' murder made international headlines and led to an outpouring of support for the rubber tappers' and environmental movements. In March 1989, a third meeting was held for the National Council of Rubber Tappers, and the Alliance of Forest Peoples was created to protect rubber tappers, rural workers, and Indigenous peoples from encroachment on traditional lands.

== Post-assassination impact ==
Mendes' death legitimized the struggle for conservation and unionization in the Amazon for a global audience, and support for the movements poured in immediately following his death. The strides forward made by activists in the wake of Mendes’ death are multifaceted, encompassing Indigenous sovereignty and alliance, the formation of extractive reserves, and government support for Mendes’ activism.

=== Grassroots organising ===
The National Council of Rubber Tappers was founded in 1985 by Mendes and other union members; in March 1989, three months after Mendes’ murder, the council held their third meeting. The Council issued twenty-seven demands on environmental and human rights protection. They also issued the following statement, titled the Declaration of the Peoples of the Forest:

The traditional peoples who today trace on the Amazonian sky the rainbow of the Alliance of the Peoples of the Forest declare their wish to see their regions preserved. They know that the development of the potential of their people and of the regions they inhabit is to be found in the future economy of their communities, and must be preserved for the whole Brazilian nation as part of its identity and self-esteem. This Alliance of the Peoples of the Forest, bringing together Indians, rubber tappers, and riverbank communities, and founded here in Acre, embraces all efforts to protect and preserve this immense but fragile life-system that involves our forests, rivers, lakes and springs, the source of our wealth and the basis of our cultures and traditions.

This indicates an increase in perceived support and an ensuing increase in demands by the National Council, responding to the context of Mendes’ death. 1986 marks the creation of the Alliance of Forest Peoples, tasked with protecting rubber tappers, rural workers, and Indigenous peoples from encroachment on traditional lands, and this group also found new footholds in the wake of Mendes’ murder. This political leverage gave the people of the forest (largely rubber tappers and Indigenous people) access to important victories. One of the most important and tangible victories was the demarcation of Kayapo and Yanomami lands in November 1991, overseen by the Collor administration. However, despite the successes Indigenous peoples saw in land recognition during this time, the sovereign nations experienced intense violence within their borders by outsiders during the following years.

=== Changes within the Brazilian government ===
The years after Mendes' murder also saw a focus on his personal advocacy projects. One of Mendes' main ideas, and a lasting impact of his life and activism, is Brazil's extractive reserves - forest land set aside by the Brazilian government to be managed cooperatively by locals, who keep it healthy while gathering its rubber, nuts, and other products to sell. These extractive reserves are funded in part by the World Bank, which once financed roads to make the Amazon easier to cut down. Their change of heart can be attributed to Mendes’s in-person, extensive lobbying of the organization. Following the increased pressure by the international community in the wake of the violence, the Brazilian government agreed to create extractive reserves and to demarcate Indian lands. The increased local support for Mendes’ activism also saw several of Mendes’ co-campaigners elected to important government offices over the next decade, which created a more receptive environment for legislation protecting the Amazon forests. Furthermore, The Brazilian government has declared him Patron of the Brazilian Environment. Institutions have been named after him, including the main state agency in charge of conservation – the Instituto Chico Mendes de Conservação da Biodiversidade.

== Honors ==
=== Sierra Club Chico Mendes Award ===
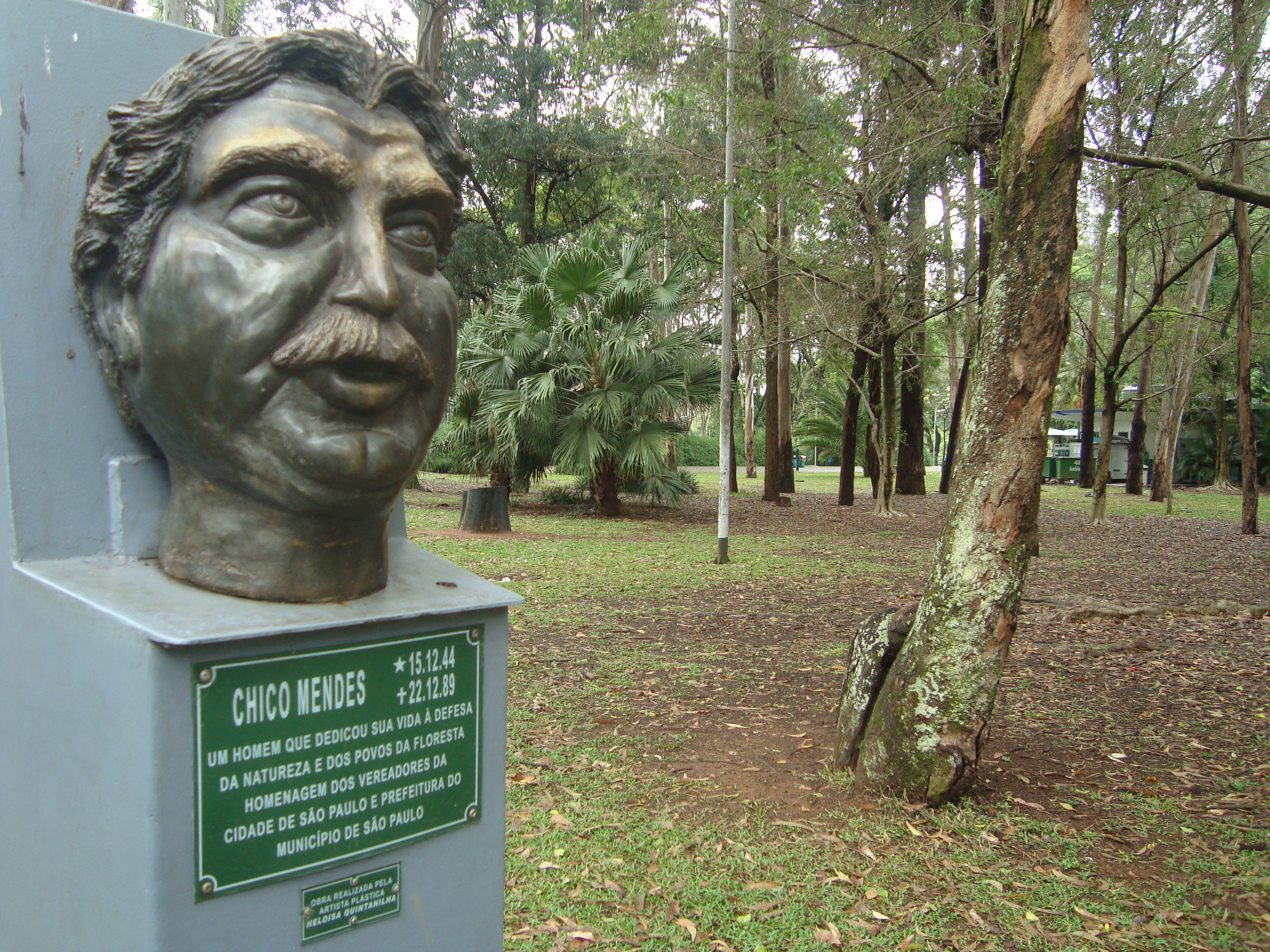
Bust in Parque Ibirapuera, São Paulo

The U.S. environmental group, Sierra Club, created a special award in 1989 named after Mendes. It was established to recognize "individuals or nongovernmental organizations outside the United States that have exhibited extraordinary courage and leadership in the universal struggle to protect the environment." The first award was presented that year jointly to Brazilian Kayapo Indians Paulinho Paiakan and Kuben-I Kayapo and to American anthropologist Darrell A. Posey, all of whom had worked together to protect the Kayapo homeland from logging and dam-building.

=== Namesake species ===
- A species of bird, Chico's tyrannulet (Zimmerius chicomendesi), was named after Mendes in 2013.
- Chicomendes, a monotypic genus of flowering vines, was named after Mendes in 2021.

=== The Chico Mendes Extractive Reserve ===
Following Mendes' death, the Chico Mendes Extractive Reserve was created on 12 March 1990 with the intention of maintaining the sustainability of resources within the Amazon forests. The Chico Mendes Extractive Reserve is the largest extractive reserve within the Amazon, covering nearly one million hectares of land. Its creation marked a shift for reserves within the Amazon, after which many other extractive reserves were established. They now account for approximately 13% of the Amazon's total area.

== In popular culture ==
=== Music ===
Songs inspired directly or in part by Mendes include:

- "Wise and Holy Woman" Christy Moore and Wally Page mention Chico Mendes
- "Cuando los Ángeles Lloran" (1995) by Mexican rock band Maná, from the album Cuando los Ángeles Lloran (1995).
- "How Many People" by Paul McCartney, from the album Flowers in the Dirt (1989).
- "Sacred Ground" by American hard rock band Living Colour, from the compilation album Pride (1995).
- "Xapurí" by Clare Fischer, from the album Lembranças (Remembrances) (1990; the song is named after Xapuri, Mendes' home town).
- "Ambush" by Brazilian heavy metal band Sepultura, from the album Roots (1996).
- "The Tallest Tree" by Roy Harper, from the album Death or Glory (1992).
- "Ricordati di Chico" (Remember Chico) by Italian band I Nomadi, from the album Gente come noi (1991).

=== Film ===
- Mendes was portrayed by Raul Julia in the 1994 telemovie The Burning Season.

== See also ==
- Vicente Canas
- Environment of Brazil
- List of peace activists
- Wilson Pinheiro
- José Cláudio Ribeiro da Silva
- Rubber tree
- Dorothy Stang
