= Table of Atlanta neighborhoods by population =

Table of Atlanta neighborhoods with over 500 population

Neighborhood	Population (2010)	NPU
Adair Park	1,331	V
Adams Park	1,763	R
Adamsville	2,403	H
Almond Park	1,020	G
Ansley Park	2,277	E
Ardmore	756	E
Argonne Forest	590	C
Arlington Estates	776	P
Ashview Heights	1,292	T
Atlanta University Center	5,703	T
Atlantic Station	1,888	E
Audubon Forest	813	I
Baker Hills	757	H
Bankhead	1,929	K
Beecher Hills	647	O
Ben Hill	1,725	P
Ben Hill Terrace	937	P
Benteen Park	893	W
Berkeley Park	1,400	D
Betmar LaVilla	578	Y
Bolton	2,996	D
Boulevard Heights	675	W
Brandon	943	C
Brookhaven (City of Atlanta)	2,358	B
Brookwood	1,834	E
Brookwood Hills	2,103	E
Browns Mill Park	2,170	Z
Buckhead Forest	2,252	B
Buckhead Village	1,343	B
Cabbagetown	1,247	N
Campbellton Road	4,709	R
Candler Park	3,291	N
Capitol Gateway	823	V
Capitol View	1,965	X
Capitol View Manor	664	X
Carey Park	1,739	G
Carroll Heights	1,173	H
Carver Hills	681	G
Cascade Avenue/Road	2,416	S
Cascade Heights	1,124	I
Castleberry Hill	1,285	M
Castlewood	741	C
Center Hill	3,058	J
Chastain Park	2,398	A
Chosewood Park	3,790	Y
Custer/McDonough/Guice	1,257	W
Collier Heights	5,593	I
Collier Hills	630	C
Cross Creek	2,041	C
Deerwood	566	P
Dixie Hills	1,756	J
Downtown	13,411	M
Druid Hills (City of Atlanta)	1,414	N
East Atlanta	5,033	W
East Chastain Park	2,065	B
East Lake	2,568	O
Edgewood	3,983	O
English Avenue	3,309	L
Fairburn Heights	1,138	H
Fairburn Mays	3,144	H
Fairway Acres	513	P
Florida Heights	1,242	I
Fort McPherson	501	S
Garden Hills	3,939	B
Georgia Tech	6,607	E
Glenrose Heights	4,071	Z
Grant Park	6,771	W
Greenbriar	3,628	R
Grove Park	4,929	J
Hammond Park	2,565	X
Harland Terrace	2,138	I
Harris Chiles	765	T
Heritage Valley	910	P
Hills Park	953	D
Home Park	4,941	E
Hunter Hills	2,223	K
Inman Park	4,098	N
Joyland	639	Y
Kings Forest	1,674	P
Kingswood	660	A
Kirkwood	5,897	O
Knight Park/Howell Station	2,545	K
Lake Claire	2,557	N
Lakewood	1,333	Z
Lakewood Heights	2,177	Y
Leila Valley	847	Z
Lenox	1,663	B
Lincoln Homes	590	G
Lindbergh	4,598	B
Lindridge/Martin Manor	4,221	F
Loring Heights	1,774	E
Margaret Mitchell	1,207	A
Marietta Street Artery	745	E
Mays	790	H
Mechanicsville	3,731	V
Midtown	16,569	E
Midwest Cascade	1,786	Q
Monroe Heights	903	G
Morningside/Lenox Park	8,030	F
Mozley Park	1,714	K
Mt. Paran/Northside	1,568	A
North Buckhead	8,270	B
Norwood Manor	871	Z
Oakland City	3,442	S
Old Fourth Ward	10,505	M
Old Gordon	761	H
Orchard Knob	673	Z
Ormewood Park	4,050	W
Paces	2,623	A
Peachtree Battle Alliance	1,540	C
Peachtree Heights East	1,081	B
Peachtree Heights West	4,767	B
Peachtree Hills	2,785	B
Peachtree Park	1,316	B
Penelope Neighbors	559	J
Peoplestown	2,612	V
Perkerson	2,347	X
Peyton Forest	817	I
Piedmont Heights	2,323	F
Pine Hills	8,033	B
Pittsburgh	3,658	V
Polar Rock	991	Z
Pamond Park	556	R
Poncey-Highland	2,133	N
Princeton Lakes	2,429	P
Reynoldstown	2,550	N
Ridgedale Park	1,685	B
Ridgewood Heights	601	C
Riverside	1,341	D
Rockdale	611	G
Rosedale Heights	844	Z
Scotts Crossing	1,164	G
South Atlanta	1,738	Y
South River Gardens	2,279	Z
South Tuxedo Park	1,085	B
Southwest	4,158	R
Springlake	1,031	C
Summerhill	2,025	V
Swallow Circle/Baywood	577	Z
Sweet Auburn	1,882	M
Sylvan Hills	4,669	X
Thomasville Heights	2,739	Z
Tuxedo Park	1,182	A
Underwood Hills	3,410	D
Venetian Hills	3,790	S
The Villages at Carver	1,039	Y
The Villages at Castleberry Hill	864	T
The Villages at East Lake	1,460	O
Vine City	2,785	L
Virginia-Highland	7,800	F
Washington Park	1,124	K
West End	4,270	T
West Highlands	1,164	G
West Lake	1,256	J
West Paces Ferry/Northside	1,218	A
Westview	3,020	T
Westwood Terrace	733	I
Whittier Mill Village	617	D
Wildwood	1,840	C
Wilson Mill Meadows	1,096	H
Wisteria Gardens	512	H

== See also ==
- Geography of Atlanta
- Neighborhoods of Atlanta
