= The Work =

The Work may refer to:

== Philosophy and religion ==
- The Great Work, an alchemical term for the process of working with the prima materia to create the philosopher's stone
- The Fourth Way, an approach to self-development developed by G. I. Gurdjieff
- The Work of Byron Katie, a method of self-inquiry
- Opus Dei, a Catholic religious organization which literally means "Work of God"

== Arts, entertainment and media ==
- "The Work, pt. 1", a 2001 song by Prince
- The Work (band), an English experimental rock band
- The Work (film), a 2017 documentary film by Jairus McLeary
- The Work (publication), a student newspaper in Tarlac City, Philippines
- The Work (Rivers of Nihil album), 2021
- The Work (Gold Panda album), 2022

== See also ==
- Work (disambiguation)
- The Works (disambiguation)
