= Artwork (disambiguation) =

An artwork, or work of art, is an aesthetic item or artistic creation.

Artwork or Artworks may also refer to:

== Arts and entertainment ==
- Artwork (album), by The Used, 2009
- Artwork (musician), a member of Magnetic Man
- Artworks (album), by Art Pepper, 1984
- Artworks (film), a 2003 crime film

== Other uses ==
- Artwork (graphic arts), a graphical representation of an image used in the printing process
- ArtWorks, a software package

== See also ==
- Art (disambiguation)
- Art Works, an Australian TV program hosted by Namila Benson (2021-2023)
- Cover art, illustration on the outside of a published product
- Work (disambiguation)
- Work of art (disambiguation)
