= 2020 droughts and heat waves =

List of heatwaves

This page documents notable droughts and heat waves worldwide in 2020.

Throughout the year, various countries' hottest ever recorded temperature records were broken. The highest temperature during the year was on August 16, when a weather station in Death Valley in the U.S. state of California recorded an air temperature of 129.6 °F (54.2 °C), the hottest temperature recorded globally in several decades. In June, Verkhoyansk in Russia's Far East recorded a temperature of 38 °C (100 °F), the hottest temperature ever recorded above the Arctic Circle.

== List ==
=== Africa ===
On April 6, Ghana recorded its highest ever temperature – 44 °C (111 °F).

=== Asia ===
There were nearly 15,000 deaths in China related to extreme heat. Throughout the year, various countries' hottest ever recorded temperatures were recorded across Asia, including Iraq, Lebanon, and Taiwan. On June 20, Verkhoyansk in Russia's Far East, recorded a temperature of 38 °C (100 °F), making it the hottest temperature ever recorded above the Arctic Circle. On August 17, Japan tied the record for its hottest day when a weather station in Shizuoka Prefecture recorded a temperature of 41.1 °C (106.0 °F).

=== Australia and Oceania ===
Australia experienced heat waves and wildfires in November, with Sydney recording two consecutive days of temperatures over 40 °C (104 °F), marking the first ever recorded such instance in the month. Andamooka, South Australia recorded a temperature of 48 °C (118 °F).

=== Europe ===
A national heat records was set in Cyprus on September 4, when Nicosia recorded a temperature of 46.2 °C (115.2 °F). In Portugal, heat waves lasted from May through September, resulting in more than 310 deaths per day between June 21 to August 7. The heat caused more deaths in the summer than the COVID-19 pandemic in the country. Throughout 2020, heat waves killed 2,556 people in the United Kingdom. Heat waves continued in Europe through September, with Lille in northern France recording a temperature of 35.1 °C (95.2 °F) recorded on September 15.

=== North America ===
From June through the end of the year, there was a heat wave and drought across much of the central to western United States, which resulted in 45 deaths and US$5.3 billion worth of damages. The ongoing heat and drought produced record large wildfires across the region, responsible for an additional 46 deaths and US$19.4 billion in damage. On August 16, a weather station in Death Valley in the U.S. state of California recorded an air temperature of 129.6 °F (54.2 °C), the hottest temperature recorded globally in several decades. The reading was possibly the hottest air temperature ever recorded on Earth, due to uncertainty in the reliability of previous measurements. In addition, Los Angeles recorded its hottest ever temperature of 121 °F (49 °C) on September 6. On August 11, Cuba recorded its highest ever temperature – 39.3 °C (102.7 °F).

=== South America ===
On September 26, Paraguay recorded its highest ever temperature – 45.5 °C (113.9 °F).

== See also ==
- 2007 North American heat wave
- 2012 North American heat wave
- Global warming
- Weather of 2020
