= Boulevard (Atlanta) =

Street in Atlanta, Georgia, US

Coordinates: 33.757892°N 84.372125°W

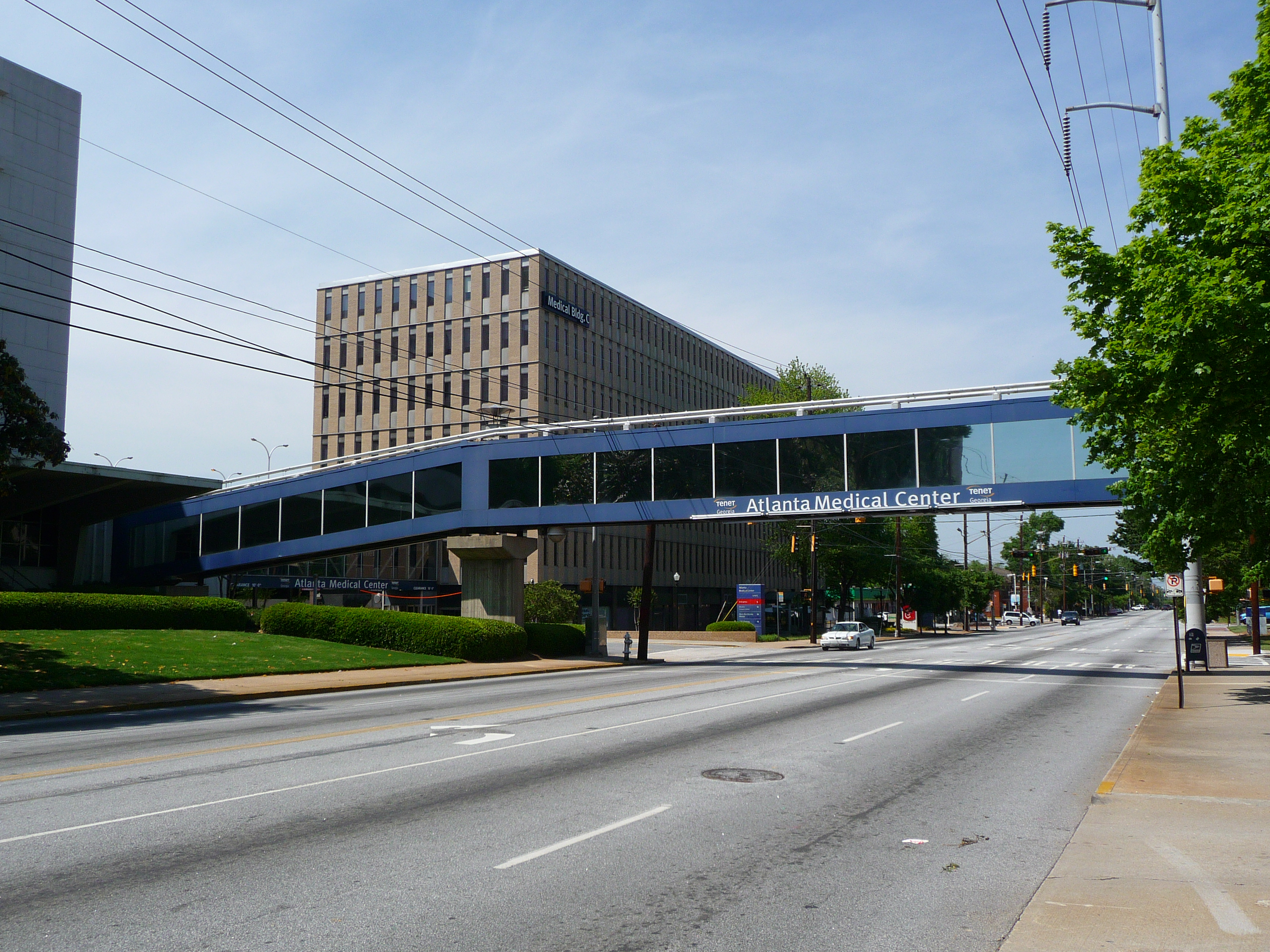
Atlanta Medical Center

Shotgun houses on Auburn Avenue at Boulevard, part of the Martin Luther King, Jr., National Historic Site

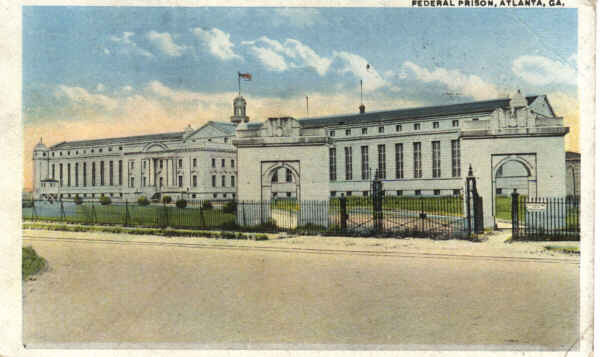
Federal Penitentiary on postcard from 1920

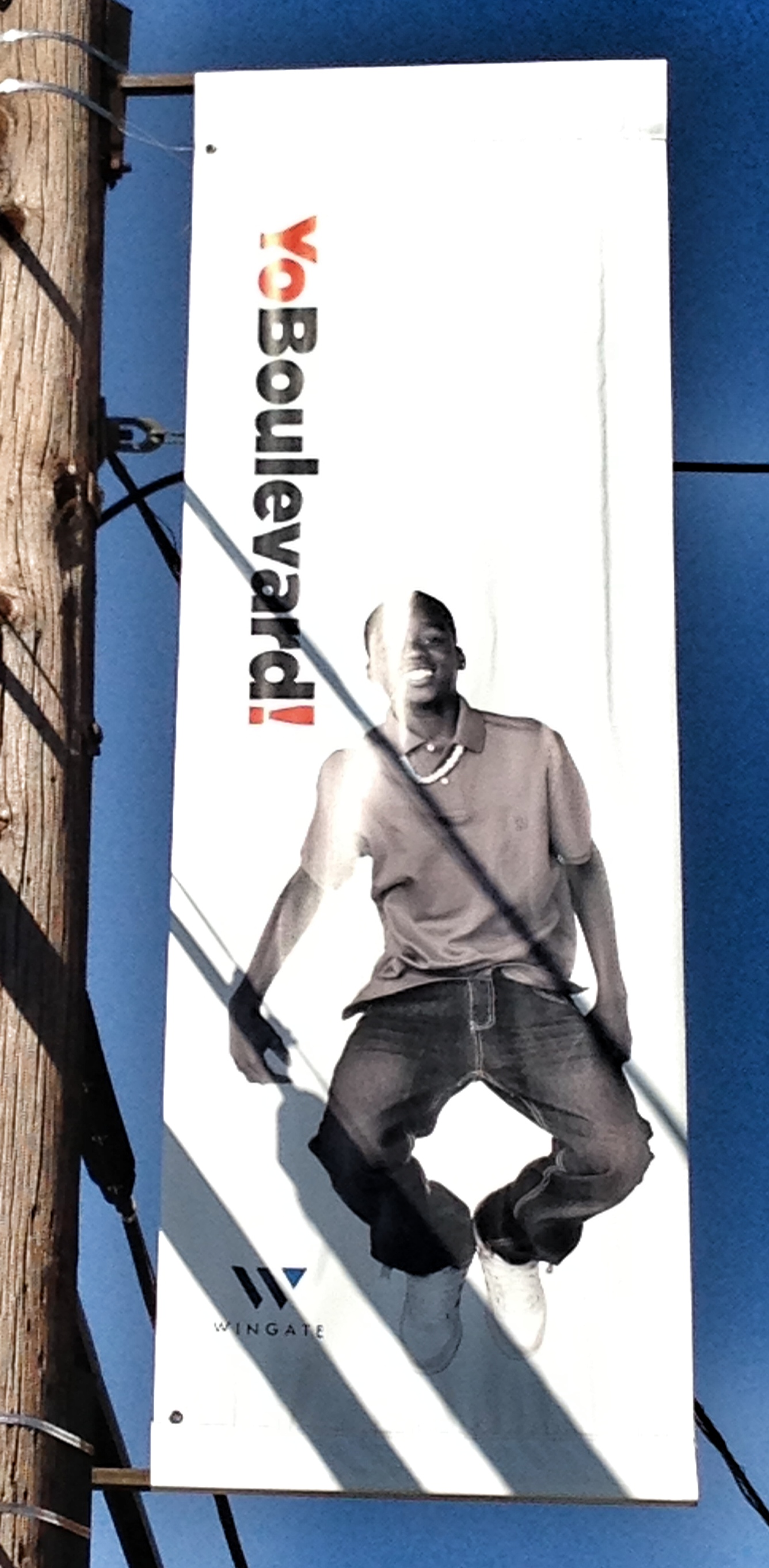
YoBoulevard! banner 2012

Boulevard is a street in and, as a corridor, a subdistrict, of the Old Fourth Ward neighborhood of Atlanta, Georgia. The street runs east of, and parallel to, Atlanta's Downtown Connector. It begins at Ponce de Leon Avenue in the north (north of which it continues as Monroe Drive), passing through the Old Fourth Ward, Cabbagetown, and Grant Park, and forming the border between Chosewood Park on the west and Boulevard Heights and Benteen Park to the east. It ends at McDonough Boulevard in the south, at the Federal Penitentiary.

== History ==
In 1895, shortly after Boulevard was built, author Margaret Severance, in her book "Official Guide to Atlanta", described it as: "a beautiful avenue, [which] will be a great pride to Atlanta in years to come. Its height, width and number of magnificent homes, with their spacious lawns, assure every observer a boulevard that any city may point to with pride. This is one of the most desirable residence streets in the city."

Boulevard remained a white street through the 1910s even as the side streets became increasingly African-American. This trend was due to Blacks moving eastwards from the Sweet Auburn area, seeking to consolidate their businesses and residences into safe, primarily black areas after the traumatic Atlanta race riot of 1906.

One institution in particular anchored the African-American presence on the neighborhood: Morris Brown College was founded in 1885 at Boulevard and Houston St. (now John Wesley Dobbs Ave.) and in 1922 expanded, acquiring the land at the southeast corner of Boulevard and Irwin St. The college moved to its present location at the Atlanta University Center in 1932; the site is now occupied by the Helene Mills Senior Center and the Mt. Zion Second Baptist Church.

From the 1920s through the 1940s many of Boulevard's homes began to be purchased by prominent African-American "doctors, bishops, ministers [and]...attorneys".

The flight of better-off residents from Intown Atlanta also affected Boulevard and the houses were replaced with apartments, which eventually came to fall under "Section 8". Boston-based Continental Wingate manages 700 units of Section 8 housing on or near Boulevard in Old Fourth Ward.

Many believe that redevelopment and gentrification on Boulevard and the immediately surrounding streets is inevitable, as most areas surrounding it now contain mixed-income or upscale housing.

== 2012 revitalization plan ==
In January 2012, City Councilman Kwanza Hall revealed a seven-point strategy, "Year of Boulevard", marketed as "YoBoulevard!" to revitalize the Boulevard corridor in the Old Fourth Ward, which included:

- An Atlanta Police Department mini-precinct within the Atlanta Medical Center that will house 12 officers exclusively dedicated to Boulevard
- Wingate management to donate an apartment within the Bedford-Pine complex to serve as a processing and booking center for people who are arrested
- Wingate cash contribution to the Old 4th Ward Security Patrol
- Atlanta Workforce Development Agency and Mt. Zion Baptist Church to host a series of youth job fairs
- Placement of garbage cans along the Boulevard corridor
- The Atlanta Dept. of Parks and Recreation creating a summer jobs program targeting kids who specifically live in Bedford-Pines
- Neighborhood beautification and trash clean-up events, as well as code enforcement

As of July 2012, Creative Loafing (Atlanta) reported that the program was having some success with mentoring of local young people and "fewer guys hanging out on the street dealing drugs".

== Notable sites in Boulevard ==
From north to south:

- Atlanta Medical Center
- Martin Luther King, Jr., National Historic Site
  - Fire Station No. 6
  - Our Lady of Lourdes Catholic Church
- Oakland Cemetery
- Grant Park, Zoo Atlanta, and the Atlanta Cyclorama
- United States Penitentiary, Atlanta
