= Argonne Forest =

Argonne Forest may refer to:

- Forest of Argonne, France
- Argonne Forest, Atlanta, a neighborhood in the United States
