= Working =

Working may refer to:

- Work (human activity), intentional activity people perform to support themselves, others, or the community

== Arts and media ==
- Working (musical), a 1978 musical
- Working (TV series), an American sitcom
- Working (Caro book), a 2019 book by Robert Caro
- Working (Terkel book), a 1974 book by Studs Terkel
- Working!!, a manga by Karino Takatsu
- "Working" (song), by Tate McRae and Khalid, 2021

== Engineering and technology ==
- Cold working or cold forming, the shaping of metal below its recrystallization temperature
- Hot working, the shaping of metal above its recrystallization temperature
- Multiple working, having more than one locomotive under the control of one driver
- Live-line working, the maintenance of electrical equipment while it is energised
- Single-line working, using one train track out of two

== Other uses ==
- Holbrook Working (1895–1985), statistician and economist
- Working the system, exploiting rules and procedures for unintended or abusive effects
- A working, being a series of occult rituals

== See also ==
- Workin' (disambiguation)
- Work (disambiguation)
- Works (disambiguation)
