= Geography of Atlanta =

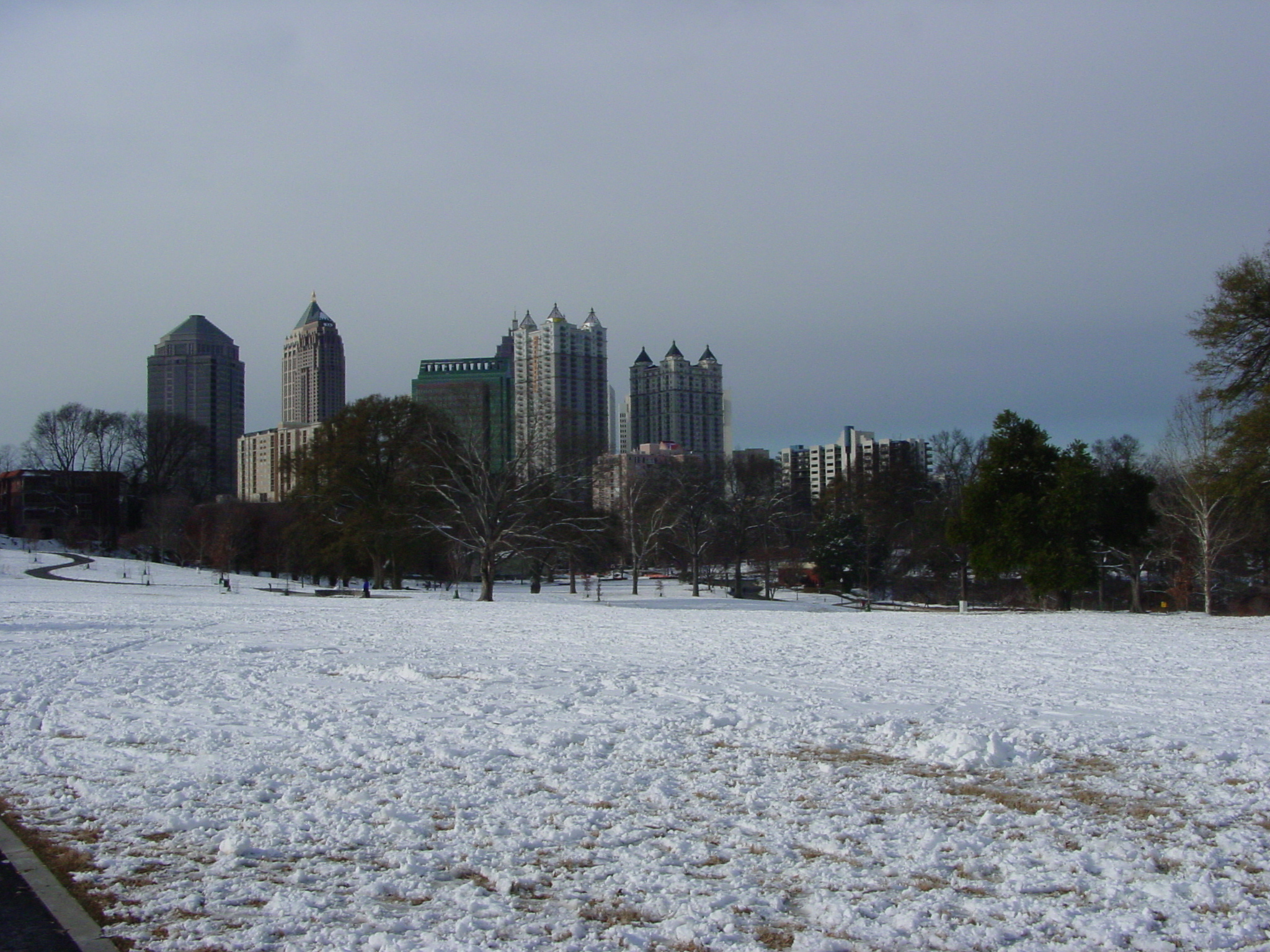
Atlanta's Piedmont Park with a blanket of winter snow

The geography of Atlanta encompasses 132.4 square miles (342.9 km^{2}), consisting of 131.7 sq mi (341 km^{2}) of land and 0.7 sq mi (1.8 km^{2}) of water. Situated among the foothills of the Appalachian Mountains at 1,050 feet (320 m) above mean sea level, Atlanta has the highest elevation among major U.S. cities east of the Mississippi River. The city straddles the Eastern Continental Divide, rainwater falling on the south and east sides of the divide flows into the Atlantic Ocean, while rainwater on the north and west side of the divide flows into the Gulf of Mexico. Atlanta sits atop a ridge south of the Chattahoochee River, which is part of the ACF River Basin. Located at the far northwestern edge of the city, much of the river's natural habitat is preserved by the Chattahoochee River National Recreation Area.

== Climate ==
Atlanta

Climate chart (precipitation, max. and min. temperature)
J	F	M	A	M	J	J	A	S	O	N	D
4.2 52 34	4.7 57 38	4.8 65 44	3.4 72 52	3.7 80 60	4 86 68	5.3 89 71	3.9 88 71	4.5 82 65	3.4 73 54	4.1 64 44	3.9 54 36
- █ Average max. and min. temperatures in °F
- █ Precipitation totals in inches
Metric conversion
J	F	M	A	M	J	J	A	S	O	N	D
107 11 1	119 14 3	122 18 7	85 22 11	93 27 16	100 30 20	134 32 22	99 31 22	114 28 18	87 23 12	104 18 6	99 12 2
- █ Average max. and min. temperatures in °C
- █ Precipitation totals in mm

According to the Koppen climate classification, Atlanta and its metropolitan area feature a humid subtropical climate (Cfa). The region experiences four distinct seasons, characterized by hot, humid summers and cool winters that are occasionally cold by Southern United States standards. Under updated climate data, the city and its immediate suburbs are located in USDA Plant Hardiness Zone 8b, while the northern suburbs transition into Zones 8a and 7b.

Summers are long, consistently hot, and humid. The daily average temperature in July is 80.2 °F (26.8 °C), with temperatures occasionally exceeding 100 °F or 37.8 °C. These days feature slight breezes and typically a 20–40% chance of afternoon thunderstorms. During these summer storms, a combination of shifting winds and locally heavy rainfall can cause temperatures to suddenly drop below 85 °F or 29.4 °C.

The daily average temperature in January is 43.3 °F or 6.3 °C, with suburban temperatures trending slightly cooler. While warm, maritime air can bring springlike conditions to the area, strong Arctic air masses can push low temperatures down between 20 and 10 °F (−6.7 and −12.2 °C). Measurable snowfall may not occur every season in the city and inner suburbs, but it does occur annually in the northern metropolitan outskirts. When snow does fall, it is almost always between December and March; only three measurable snowfalls have occurred outside these months in the past 90 years, the largest being 1.0 inch on November 11, 1968.

Typical of the southeastern United States, Atlanta receives abundant rainfall that is relatively evenly distributed throughout the year, though spring and early autumn are markedly drier. Average annual rainfall is about 49.7 inches (1,260 mm); late winter, early spring, and July are the wettest periods, while autumn - especially October - is the driest. Despite having far fewer rainy days overall, Atlanta's average yearly rainfall is higher than that of the Seattle area, largely due to heavy afternoon thunderstorms and occasional tropical depressions.

=== Extremes ===
Temperatures at or above 90 °F (32.2 °C) now occur on 44 days per year, up from 37 days historically. Extremes have ranged from a high 91 days in 2019, to a low of 2 days in 1967. While overnight freezes can be expected on 40 days annually, daytime high temperatures rarely fail to climb above the freezing mark.

However, during severe winter months influenced by high-latitude atmospheric blocking, monthly averages can occasionally fall below freezing. The coldest month on record was January 1977, which averaged 29.3 °F (−1.5 °C). Notably, this pattern caused Atlanta's monthly average to be 2.7 °F (1.5 °C) colder than that of Anchorage, Alaska, despite Anchorage lying nearly 30 degrees of latitude further north. The only other month with a subfreezing mean has been January 1940 with an average of 29.6 °F (−1.3 °C) and a record cold mean maximum of 38.0 °F (3.3 °C).

Snowfall averages 2.9 inches (7.4 cm) per season. The heaviest single storm brought 8.3 in (21 cm) on January 23, 1940, the most snow in one calendar day, and the most in a calendar month; the most snowfall in a season (July 1 through June 30 of the next year) is 10.9 in (28 cm) in 1935–36. True blizzards are rare but possible; the Storm of the Century, which affected the region on March 12–14, 1993, is one such example, bringing snowdrifts up to 6 ft (1.8 m) high in some parts of north Georgia. Ice storms usually cause more trouble than does snowfall; the most severe such storms may have occurred on January 7, 1973, and January 9, 2011. In 2010, Atlanta had its first White Christmas since 1882 and 1883. Later that same winter (the third-coldest ever), a major snow-and-ice storm almost prevented the inauguration of the new governor of Georgia, and crippled the region for two days, with snow still left more than a week later in some places.

Official weather recordkeeping began in Atlanta in 1878, on the morning of October 3. Since then, the highest recorded temperatures at Atlanta were 106 °F (41 °C) on June 30, 2012; the hottest month on record is August 2007, with a mean temperature of 85.6 °F (29.8 °C). The lowest recorded temperatures were −6 °F (−21.1 °C) and −8 °F (−22.2 °C) on January 20 and 21 of 1985, and −9 °F (−22.8 °C) on February 13, 1899. There was also an official recording of −10 °F (−23.3 °C) in 1985 in Marietta. The coldest high temperature was 7 °F (−13.9 °C), again on February 13, 1899, while, conversely, the hottest low temperature was 82 °F (27.8 °C) on August 8, 2007.

The rainiest month ever was July 1994, when Tropical Storm Alberto dumped massive amounts of rain on parts of the state and the south metro area, bringing 17.71 inches (449.8 mm) at Atlanta, over three times a normal July. Flooding was a major problem in those areas, and further down-state it was a major disaster. The driest months were October 1963 and October 2024, when in both situations record dry spells occurred over the entire eastern and southern United States (except Florida peninsula), leaving Atlanta with only a trace of precipitation for the entire month.

=== Data ===
Climate data for Atlanta (Hartsfield–Jackson Int'l), 1991–2020 normals (Note: Mean monthly maxima and minima (i.e. the highest and lowest temperature readings during an entire month or year) calculated based on data at said location from 1991 to 2020.), extremes 1878–present (Note: Official records for Atlanta were kept at the Weather Bureau in downtown from October 1878 to August 1928, and at Hartsfield–Jackson Int'l since September 1928.)
Month	Jan	Feb	Mar	Apr	May	Jun	Jul	Aug	Sep	Oct	Nov	Dec	Year
Record high °F (°C)	79 (26)	81 (27)	89 (32)	93 (34)	97 (36)	106 (41)	105 (41)	104 (40)	102 (39)	98 (37)	84 (29)	79 (26)	106 (41)
Mean maximum °F (°C)	70.3 (21.3)	73.5 (23.1)	80.8 (27.1)	84.7 (29.3)	89.6 (32.0)	94.3 (34.6)	95.8 (35.4)	95.9 (35.5)	91.9 (33.3)	85.0 (29.4)	77.5 (25.3)	71.5 (21.9)	97.3 (36.3)
Mean daily maximum °F (°C)	54.0 (12.2)	58.2 (14.6)	65.9 (18.8)	73.8 (23.2)	81.1 (27.3)	87.1 (30.6)	90.1 (32.3)	89.0 (31.7)	83.9 (28.8)	74.4 (23.6)	64.1 (17.8)	56.2 (13.4)	73.2 (22.9)
Daily mean °F (°C)	44.8 (7.1)	48.5 (9.2)	55.6 (13.1)	63.2 (17.3)	71.2 (21.8)	77.9 (25.5)	80.9 (27.2)	80.2 (26.8)	74.9 (23.8)	64.7 (18.2)	54.2 (12.3)	47.3 (8.5)	63.6 (17.6)
Mean daily minimum °F (°C)	35.6 (2.0)	38.9 (3.8)	45.3 (7.4)	52.5 (11.4)	61.3 (16.3)	68.6 (20.3)	71.8 (22.1)	71.3 (21.8)	65.9 (18.8)	54.9 (12.7)	44.2 (6.8)	38.4 (3.6)	54.1 (12.3)
Mean minimum °F (°C)	17.3 (−8.2)	23.2 (−4.9)	28.1 (−2.2)	36.9 (2.7)	47.6 (8.7)	59.9 (15.5)	65.6 (18.7)	64.5 (18.1)	53.4 (11.9)	38.7 (3.7)	29.2 (−1.6)	23.8 (−4.6)	15.2 (−9.3)
Record low °F (°C)	−8 (−22)	−9 (−23)	10 (−12)	25 (−4)	37 (3)	39 (4)	53 (12)	55 (13)	36 (2)	28 (−2)	3 (−16)	0 (−18)	−9 (−23)
Average precipitation inches (mm)	4.59 (117)	4.55 (116)	4.68 (119)	3.81 (97)	3.56 (90)	4.54 (115)	4.75 (121)	4.30 (109)	3.82 (97)	3.28 (83)	3.98 (101)	4.57 (116)	50.43 (1,281)
Average snowfall inches (cm)	1.0 (2.5)	0.4 (1.0)	0.4 (1.0)	0.0 (0.0)	0.0 (0.0)	0.0 (0.0)	0.0 (0.0)	0.0 (0.0)	0.0 (0.0)	0.0 (0.0)	0.0 (0.0)	0.4 (1.0)	2.2 (5.6)
Average precipitation days (≥ 0.01 in)	11.1	10.4	10.5	8.9	9.4	11.1	12.0	10.2	7.3	6.8	7.9	10.7	116.3
Average snowy days (≥ 0.01 in)	0.7	0.3	0.1	0.0	0.0	0.0	0.0	0.0	0.0	0.0	0.0	0.4	1.5
Average relative humidity (%)	67.6	63.4	62.4	61.0	67.2	69.8	74.4	74.8	73.9	68.5	68.1	68.4	68.3
Average dew point °F (°C)	29.3 (−1.5)	30.9 (−0.6)	38.5 (3.6)	45.7 (7.6)	56.1 (13.4)	63.7 (17.6)	67.8 (19.9)	67.5 (19.7)	62.1 (16.7)	49.6 (9.8)	41.0 (5.0)	33.1 (0.6)	48.8 (9.3)
Mean monthly sunshine hours	164.0	171.7	220.5	261.2	288.6	284.8	273.8	258.6	227.5	238.5	185.1	164.0	2,738.3
Percentage possible sunshine	52	56	59	67	67	66	63	62	61	68	59	53	62
Average ultraviolet index	2.8	4.1	6.1	7.9	9.1	9.7	9.9	9.2	7.4	5.2	3.3	2.5	6.4
Source 1: NOAA (relative humidity, dew point and sun 1961–1990)
Source 2: Extremes UV Index Today (1995 to 2022)

See or edit raw graph data.

=== Effect on vegetation ===
Some palm trees like palmetto and cacti like prickly pear can withstand the cold nights, complementing numerous flowering pansies and a few camellias, and other mild-winter-friendly plants of the region. The growing season in the area lasts several months, hardy plants being as early as mid February, and others from mid March to late October, when the last and first cold snaps usually occur. Spring weather is pleasant but variable, as cold fronts often bring strong or severe thunderstorms to almost all of the eastern and central U.S. Pollen counts tend to be extraordinarily high in the spring, regularly exceeding 2000 particles per cubic meter in April and causing hay fever, sometimes even in people not normally prone to it. Pine pollen leaves a fine yellow-green film on everything for much of that month. The rain helps wash out Atlanta's abundant oak, pine, and grass pollens, and fuels beautiful blooms from native flowering dogwood trees, as well as azaleas, forsythias, magnolias, and peach trees (both flowering-only and fruiting). The citywide floral display runs during March and April, and inspires the Atlanta Dogwood Festival, one of Atlanta's largest. Fall is also pleasant, with less rain and fewer storms, and leaves changing color from late October to mid-November, especially during drier years. A secondary peak in severe storms also occurs around the second week of November.

=== Effect of geography ===
The area's geography affects the weather as well. An anticyclone over the Northeastern U.S. will blow cold air over the warmer Atlantic Ocean, forming a wedge or marine layer up against the mountains. This east or northeast wind will often blow down into the metro area in winter or even spring (sometimes fall and very rarely summer), dramatically lowering the temperature and bringing clouds and often fog or mist, along with a swift breeze. The temperature gradient across the sprawling metro Atlanta can be as much as 20 °F or 10 °C, occasionally even more. In winter this can be a curse, bringing freezing rain to exposed objects on the north and/or east sides of town, and occasionally very dangerously to the ground and roads. Later in the spring however, it can be a great blessing, as it often protects the area from severe thunderstorms and tornadoes, with the cool air acting like a fire extinguisher to the storms. The wedge may occasionally go the entire way through central Georgia and even into Alabama in the strongest conditions, while still leaving areas of northwest Georgia much warmer than the metro area. Conversely, shallow and heavy cold air from the northwest may be blocked by the mountains, preventing snow.

The local geography also plays a role in the day-to-day weather, with the shallow valleys to the southwest (rather than the mountains to the northeast) cooling rapidly on clear and calm nights, particularly when the humidity is low. Peachtree City and especially Newnan often report dramatically lower temperatures (by as much as 4 °C or 7.2 °F) on the 10 pm and 11 pm news, and will not drop much further, while the city (built on a ridge) will continue falling slowly but never reach that low. This type of dramatic difference in microclimate is somewhat unusual for a place not near large mountains or bodies of water.

=== Extreme weather ===
==== Tropical cyclones ====
Hurricane Opal brought sustained tropical storm conditions to the area one night in early October 1995, uprooting hundreds of trees (mainly oaks) and causing widespread power outages, after soaking the area with rain for two days prior. The western metro area caught the worst of the storm, gusting to nearly 70 miles per hour (113 km/h; 31 m/s) officially at Marietta.

Such events are very rare so far inland, some 250 miles (400 km) inland from the Gulf of Mexico where most of the storms come from; however some areas particularly east and south of the city received similar damage from the wide wind field of Hurricane Irma in September 2017, with a gust to 64 miles per hour (103 km/h) at Atlanta's airport and sustained winds up to 45 mph (72 km/h) there. Record-cool high temperatures of 64 °F (18 °C) caused by cold-air damming against the Appalachians served to eliminate the normal tornado risk in north Georgia and to weaken the storm faster than expected, reducing the anticipated damage to the area. Less than a month later in early October 2017, the much smaller Hurricane Nate was forecast to pass rapidly through northwest Georgia as a weak tropical storm, expected to cause far fewer issues to the metro area than Irma. These two storms caused the first tropical storm watches (and for Irma, warnings) for the area since these were allowed to be issued for inland locations instead of just coastal ones.

==== Tornadoes ====
Since 1950, some metro counties have been hit more than 20 times by tornadoes, with Cobb (26) and Fulton (22) being two of the highest in the state. (Note that some tornadoes may have occurred at the same time, or in two different counties.) Another struck the Georgia Governor's Mansion in 1975. The Dunwoody tornado in early April 1998 was the worst tornado to have struck the suburban area. Since then, many counties have reinstalled civil defense sirens removed after the Cold War.

On March 14, 2008, an EF2 tornado hit downtown Atlanta with winds up to 135 mph (217 km/h). The tornado caused damage to Philips Arena, the Westin Peachtree Plaza Hotel, the Georgia Dome, Centennial Olympic Park, the CNN Center, and the Georgia World Congress Center. It also damaged the nearby neighborhoods of Vine City to the west and Cabbagetown, and Fulton Bag and Cotton Mills to the east. While there were dozens of injuries, only one fatality was reported. City officials warned it could take months to clear the devastation left by the tornado.

==== Winter storms ====
The area experiences a winter storm with significant snowfall about once each year, however this can be extremely irregular. During the 2000s, only four major snows occurred (December 2000, January 2002, January 2008, and March 2009), while three occurred in early 2010 (an El Niño year) alone, making it the snowiest winter since the 1970s. Despite predictions of a warm and dry winter due to La Niña developing the following summer, additional 1.2 inches (3.0 cm) fell on December 25, giving the city (and its northern and western suburbs) its first true white Christmas in over a century. The only other measurable snows on that date were 1.6 inches (4.1 cm) in 1881, and 0.3 inches (0.8 cm) in 1882. A trace last fell on Christmas in 1993, and a dozen other years before that.

A blizzard (see: 1993 Storm of the Century) caught much of the Southeast off-guard in 1993, dumping 4.5 inches (11.4 cm) at the Atlanta airport on March 13, and much more than that in the suburbs to the north and west, as well as in the mountains. Dallas, a suburb about 30 miles or 48 kilometres to the west-northwest, received 17.5 inches (44.5 cm) from the storm. Some people were awakened by thunder and lightning in a very rare thundersnow event. Several areas of northern Cobb County recorded over 15 inches (38 cm) in snowdrifts. It is widely regarded as the snow event of the century for Atlanta, and is referred to as the "Storm of the Century", placing fifth in the city's snowfall records. The only other recorded winter storm of comparable severity was the Great Blizzard of 1899, which struck in February. A blizzard hit on January 9–15 crippling the city and leaving schools out for the whole week. Ice-covered roads and over eight inches of snow fell in some places with over a foot in the far northern metropolitan area.

The heaviest snow, however, was on January 23, 1940, when 8.3 inches (21.1 cm) buried the city during its second-coldest month on record. The second-heaviest was in 1983, when a very late storm dumped 7.9 inches (20.1 cm) on March 24. The latest snow and freeze ever were in 1910, when 1.5 inches (3.8 cm) and 32 °F (0 °C) were recorded on April 25. Since 1928, the earliest measurable snows were November 11 and 23, followed in 2013 by 0.4 inches (1.0 cm) on the 27th, the day before the second-coldest Thanksgiving on record.

Prior to March 2009, the most recent major snow occurred at the beginning of 2002, when up to 3 inches (7.6 cm) fell on January 2–3. As of 2007, the stretch of five nearly or entirely snowless winters made for an extremely long period compared to average. This streak was ended in January 2008 when 0.4 inches (1.0 cm) fell on January 16 and 1 inch (2.5 cm) fell three days later. The following year, the first widespread winter storm since 2002 dumped 4.5 inches (11.4 cm) on March 1, with the heaviest to the southwest and east-northeast, and surprisingly little or nothing in the far northern suburbs and mountains. Much of it melted almost as fast as it was accumulating at mid-day, while eastern areas had thundersnow and cloud-to-ground strikes reported by lightning detection; it was an upper-level low from the Great Plains, while most major storms in the area occur with a typical surface low-pressure area traveling along the Gulf coast. The 2009 snow tied with the 1993 blizzard and another storm for fifth-heaviest official daily snow in the city's recorded weather history.

Areas to the due east and west often receive more snow than metro Atlanta, because the energy begins to transfer to a coastal low in the Atlantic, on its way to becoming a nor'easter. Also the mountains to the northwest entrap shallow cold air. Average annual snowfall from 1971 to 2000 in Atlanta is 2.9 inches (7.4 cm) – the snowiest month is January with 0.9 inches (2.3 cm). Due to two record-breaking heavy storms during the averaged period, it is actually March that is statistically second with 0.5 inches (1.3 cm) – cut in half if the heaviest storm is removed. This is followed by February with 0.4 inches (1.0 cm) and December with 0.3 inches (0.8 cm), then November, April, and October averaging a trace each. The latest was April 25, when 1.5 inches (3.8 cm) fell in 1910, also the heaviest for the month, and the latest-ever freeze. Four other April snows have been recorded since 1879, the most recent significant one being April 3, 1987. Flurries occurred in 1993 on the afternoon of Halloween, marking only the third recorded October snow (all of which were an unmeasurable trace).

Although December is just as cold as February and has more days, it receives the least snow of any winter month (roughly once per decade), due to less overall precipitation in the later months of the year compared to the rainier mid and late winter. However, the lowest sun and shortest days of the year mean that what does fall can stay around for days. A mid-December 2000 snow (a record 2.5 inches (6.4 cm) for the month) was followed by very cold weather that left spots of it on the ground in shady areas until Christmas. Following the 2010 snow, the next December event was in 2017, when the heaviest snows since the March 1993 blizzard hit the northwestern suburbs and west-northwestern exurbs. Paulding, northwest Cobb, and southeast Bartow counties were hit with up to 13 inches (33 cm) of very heavy and wet snow, due to the temperature being slightly above freezing for much of the event. The very high water content and lack of any wind in turn caused widespread power outages as major accumulations brought down power lines, leaving some without electricity for days. This was the earliest in the season that the metro area is known to have received so much snow, though long-term official records are only kept at Atlanta proper.

Ice storms have also occurred in the area. Two hit the city a week apart in January 2000, the second one while Atlanta was hosting Super Bowl XXXIV, which was felt to affect the city's future chances for hosting it again. The well-remembered January 1973 ice storm was brutal, and was followed in February by the record-breaking 1973 Southeast U.S. snowstorm that hit the coastal half of the state, bringing light snow to what were then the far southeastern suburbs. A January 1982 snowstorm, which came to be called "Snow Jam '82" by the media and those who lived through it, also crippled the city just as bad as ice can, striking in the afternoon while everyone was at work, several hours earlier than expected. Tens of thousands of people were stranded in the city, abandoning cars on every road and freeway and booking hotels to capacity, unable to get home to the suburbs.

Despite this well-known experience, the same thing happened in January 2014, when snow expected to hit mainly middle Georgia in the afternoon crept northward at midday, the resulting road ice stranding children in schools and even on school buses overnight, while people slept in makeshift shelters such as Home Depot, Kroger, and CVS stores, and in fire stations and even in their vehicles. Commutes that normally take minutes instead took several hours or even until the next day, with average speeds near zero and many vehicles running out of gasoline. Several people simply walked to their destination, while Georgia National Guard troops were called to join HERO units along with the Georgia State Patrol and local police in checking on stuck and abandoned cars. While only 2.6 inches (6.6 cm) fell on the afternoon of the 28th, and many issues from the 2011 snow-then-ice storm had been addressed, the sudden rush of traffic between noon and 1pm rapidly created massive gridlock and prevented snow removal and deicing equipment from going anywhere. GDOT equipment that had been dispatched to areas further down-state based on early forecasts also lessened the response, as they could not get back north to their regular districts in time. Officials tried to blame the National Weather Service, but this was refuted by The Weather Channel, CNN, and local TV stations, which showed that winter storm warnings were extended up to the northern suburbs more than two hours before most school systems needed to decide on whether to cancel school for the day, and even the prior winter weather advisory should have been enough to cause these cancellations.

=== Drought ===
The driest year in Atlanta history was 1954 (31 inches of rain), with 2007 being a close second. The 2006–2008 Southeastern United States drought began with dry weather in 2006, and left area lakes very low. Most of the area's drinking water is stored in Lake Lanier and Lake Allatoona, which reached record low levels in December 2007. Up through September 2007 was the driest year on record in over 75 years, second only to 1927 and 1931. On September 28, the state issued a total outdoor watering ban for the north and northwestern 40% or so of the state, affecting 61 counties generally north of the Fall Line. (Some local authorities and water systems had already taken such measures.) It was the first time the state had enacted such a ban. Throughout the 3-year drought the Atlanta area occasionally experienced smoke from the wildfires in south Georgia, causing the local air to become dangerous for everyone. The severe record drought which affected the region starting in late 2006 finally began to abate significantly after heavy fall rains in 2009.

=== Flooding ===
The historic drought ended with historic flooding in 2009. The 2009 Atlanta floods affected the entire area on September 21, 2009, with parts of eastern Paulding, northern Douglas, and southwestern Cobb counties getting around 20 inches (500 mm) of rain in a week, with half of that falling in just 24 hours near the end of the period. Douglasville received the most rain in 24 hours than any other city in metro Atlanta, the city received over 16.5 inches of rain on Sept 21, 2009. (The USGS calculated it to be a greater-than-500-year flood; the National Weather Service stated that chances of that much rain anywhere in the region are 1 in 10,000 years.) Some freeways closed temporarily, and several small bridges and culverts were ruined and will take months to replace. Many homes in the area were completely destroyed. Occasional heavy rains and flood advisories continued through early February 2010.

Flood events are localized from nearly stationary thunderstorms, or more broadly impacting from slow-moving tropical storm remnants, or sometimes from unusually heavy and persistent winter rains during El Niño years. Other droughts have also ended in lesser floods, including in 1989. The flooding has also ended as of 2010.

== Environmental issues ==
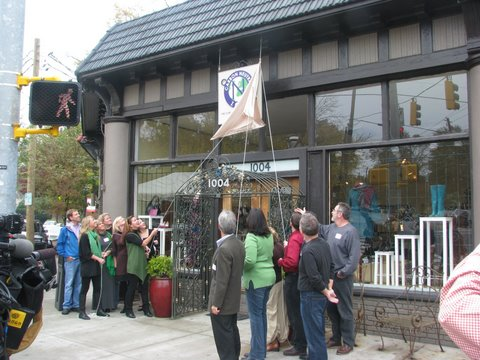
Announcement of Virginia-Highland's carbon-neutral zone, the first in the United States

In 2007, the American Lung Association ranked Atlanta as having the 13th highest level of particle pollution in the United States. The combination of pollution and pollen levels, and uninsured citizens caused the Asthma and Allergy Foundation of America to name Atlanta as the worst American city for asthma sufferers to live in. However in 2010, all counties in the Atlanta metro area began requiring yearly emissions testing for all motor vehicles, with the exception of antique cars and the three most recent model years.

Bright spots include projects that encourage smart growth, such as the BeltLine and Atlantic Station mixed-use development, which the Environmental Protection Agency commended in 2005. In 2009, Atlanta's Virginia-Highland became the first carbon-neutral zone in the United States. There, neighborhood merchants, through the Chicago Climate Exchange, directly fund the Valley Wood Carbon Sequestration Project (thousands of acres of forest in rural Georgia).
