= The Work (Gold Panda album) =

2022 studio album

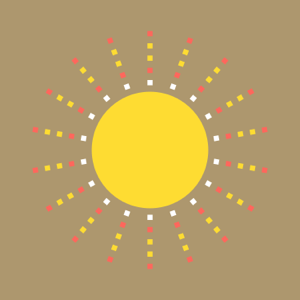

Studio album by Gold Panda
- Released: 11 November 2022
- Length: 39:37
- Label: City Slang
- Producer: Gold Panda

Gold Panda chronology
Jag Trax (as DJ Jenifa) (2019)	The Work (2022)	Ton Up (2026)

Singles from The Work
- 1. "I've Felt Better (Than I Do Now)" Released: 24 May 2022; 2. "The Corner" Released: 7 September 2022; 3. "The Dream" Released: 11 October 2022

The Work is the sixth studio album by English electronic musician Derwin Dicker under the alias Gold Panda, released on 11 November 2022 by City Slang. The album is Dicker's first as Gold Panda since 2016's Good Luck and Do Your Best.

== Release ==
The album's lead single, "I've Felt Better (Than I Do Now)", was released on 24 May 2022, prior to the album's announcement. Upon release, Dicker called the song a "hint of what else is to come in 2022", and shared that he had survived a brain hemorrhage in the time since his last release in 2019.

Dicker announced the album on 7 September, also providing the release date, tracklist, and cover art, and releasing the second single, "The Corner". "The Corner" includes a looped sample from the Dean Friedman song "Lydia", and was inspired by the HBO series The Wire. On 13 June 2023, Dicker released a new version of "The Corner" featuring rappers Open Mike Eagle, Infinite Livez, and McKinley Dixon.

The third single, "The Dream", was released on 11 October, with a music video directed by Rob Brandon. The album was released on 11 November 2022 by City Slang.

== Reception ==
The Work ratings
Aggregate scores
Source	Rating
AnyDecentMusic?	7.5/10
Metacritic	78/100
Review scores
Source	Rating
AllMusic	4/5 stars
Clash	8/10
Loud and Quiet	8/10
MusicOMH	4/5 stars
Pitchfork	7.0/10
PopMatters	8/10
Record Collector	4/5 stars
The Skinny	4/5 stars
Slant Magazine	3.5/5 stars
Uncut	7/10

According to the review aggregator Metacritic, The Work received "generally favorable reviews" based on a weighted average score of 78 out of 100 from 8 critic scores.

== Track listing ==
All tracks are written by Derwin Dicker. All tracks produced by Gold Panda.

The Work track listing
No.	Title	Length
1.	"Swimmer"	1:35
2.	"The Dream"	4:18
3.	"The Corner"	3:41
4.	"The Want"	3:47
5.	"I've Felt Better (Than I Do Now)"	4:21
6.	"Plastic Future"	5:37
7.	"New Days"	3:42
8.	"I Spiral"	2:23
9.	"Arima"	3:10
10.	"Chrome"	3:45
11.	"Joni's Room"	3:18
Total length:		39:37

== Personnel ==
- Gold Panda – composer, producer
- Luke Abbott – mixing engineer
- Guy Davie – mastering engineer
