= Chosewood Park =

Neighborhood of Atlanta, Georgia, United States

Coordinates: 33.720359°N 84.376547°W

- Neighborhoods of Atlanta
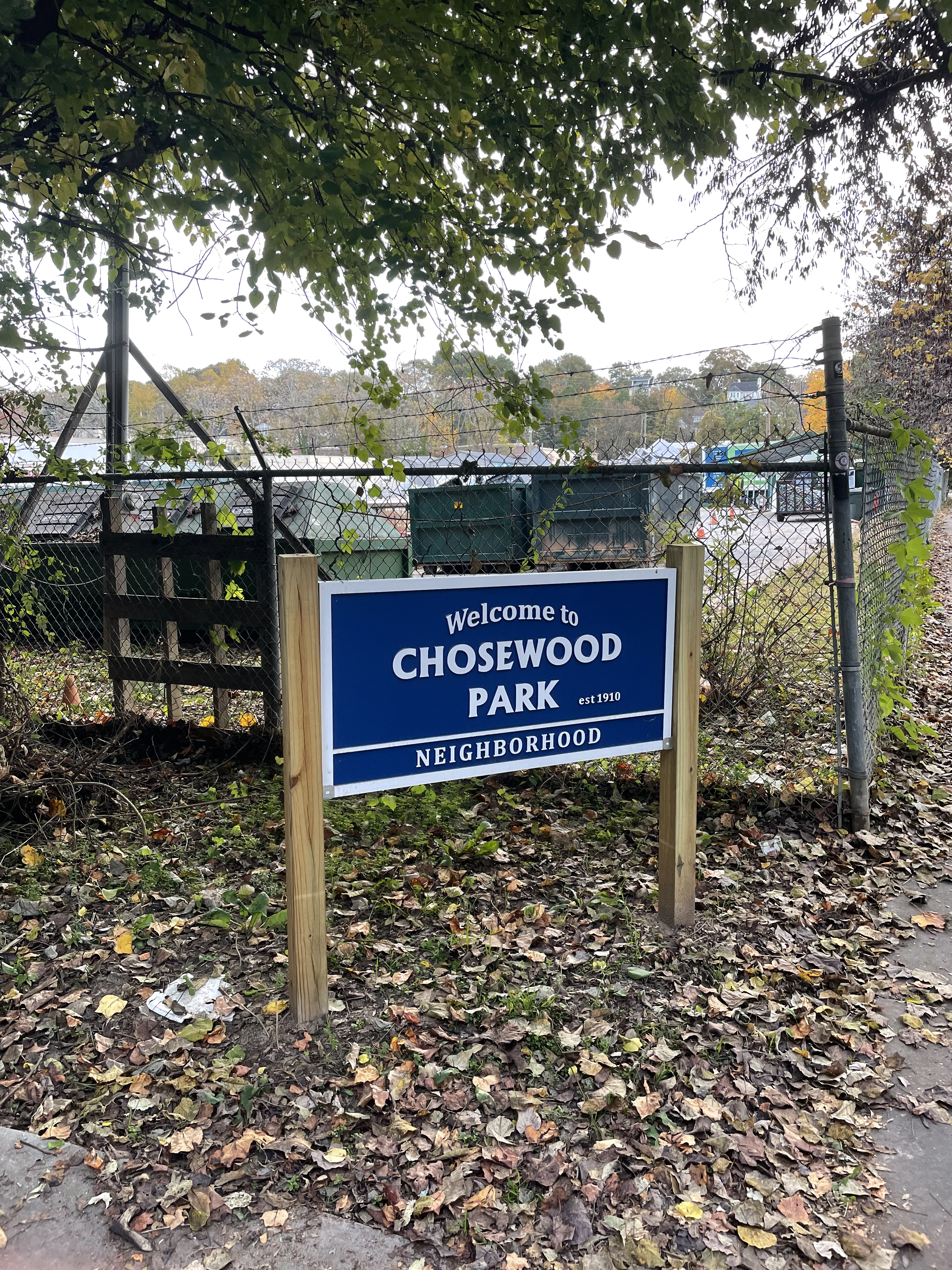
- Chosewood Park sign
- Interactive map of Chosewood Park
- Country: United States
- State: Georgia
- County: Fulton County
- City: Atlanta
- NPU: Y

Population (2008)
  - Total: 2,497

Chosewood Park is a neighborhood in southeast Atlanta, Georgia, in the United States. It is located south of Peoplestown and Grant Park, west of Boulevard Heights and Benteen Park, northwest of Thomasville Heights and the Atlanta federal penitentiary, and northeast of South Atlanta and Lakewood Heights. It is situated directly on the path of the Atlanta Beltline, which has begun to acquire and develop properties along the rail lines in the Chosewood corridor, including the Boulevard Crossing Park.

The neighborhood is composed of craftsman-style bungalows, many of which were built in the early 1900s. Many of the newly constructed homes in the neighborhood also reflect this craftsman theme while adding modern amenities.

Chosewood Park is named for the six-acre park located near the center of the neighborhood. The park offers tennis courts, basketball courts, a baseball field, a children's playground and a small grilling area. Portions of the neighborhood are perched atop a gently sloping hill that provides an unobstructed view of the downtown Atlanta skyline from the neighborhood's north side. In 2010 the park was enlarged to include approximately six additional acres to the southeast of the original park. The additional acres contains mostly deep woods with nature trails. The Park is designated a Certified Wildlife Habitat by National Wildlife Federation.

== History ==
Chosewood Park was primarily work force housing for the United States Penitentiary, Atlanta, established in 1902. Between 1927 and 1990, the workers at the Lakewood Assembly plant operated by General Motors populated the neighborhood. In the late 2000s, Chosewood Park neighborhood experienced a surge in interest as close-in neighborhoods gained in popularity. Several large developments were planned around the periphery of the neighborhood including the Village at Chosewood Park (planned for the Lakewood Assembly site), and Cityview @ Englewood between the single family area and the Atlanta BeltLine. These were in the approval process when the United States housing bubble stopped progress on the projects and the wave of foreclosures that swept the U.S. hit Chosewood early and hard.

By 2008 approximately 24% of the housing stock in the neighborhood was vacant, most having been scavenged of all items of any value. By the end of 2008 houses were selling for less than $9,000. This was not uncommon on the south side of Atlanta.

As part of the Atlanta Housing Authority plan to Demolished public housing projects in Atlanta Englewood Manor was razed in 2009.

City BeltLine projects in the neighborhood include "Phase I opened ... in fall 2011, and it is an illustration of how the Atlanta BeltLine vision is taking hold in areas that had fallen into disuse and been neglected over time. Blighted industrial land along Boulevard south of Grant Park has been transformed into five acres of glorious greenspace featuring two large multiuse activity fields."

By the end of 2012 more than 60% of the dilapidated or vacant houses were renovated. Property crime and violent crime are rare within the neighborhood, though the periphery experiences a significant number along the arterial streets bounding the neighborhood.

Chosewood Park is the pilot site for Edible Neighborhood. In February 2013 two dozen fruit and nut trees were planted along the sidewalks of Chosewood Park. This was the beginning of the pilot project. The trees were followed by hundreds of edible flowers planted in the sidewalk strips. In March 2013 three dozen herbs were planted: rosemary, oregano, thyme. All planted along the sidewalks and curbsides of Chosewood, available to everyone to take a snip for cooking. The following winter saw the planting of blueberries, raspberries, grapes, and figs along the sidewalks. In February 2017 another planting of 2 dozen apple, plum, pear, persimmon, and fig trees was provided for all neighbors who want to host a fruit tree for the neighborhood.

Edible Neighborhood, a program to encourage community building, local food, and celebration of "permanent" plantings, began with this neighborhood project.

== Chosewood Park Neighborhood Association ==
The Chosewood Park Neighborhood Association (CPNA) is actively engaged in improvement projects, social activities, and security. In 2011 the neighborhood volunteers removed invasive species and planted 50 native trees and understory within the park's woodland.

The neighborhood association organizes tree and flower planting along neighborhood streets. In January 2013 approximately 1,000 day lilies were planted along neighborhood streets. In February 2013 over 20 fruit trees were planted. In March 2013 neighborhood volunteers and Trees Atlanta volunteers planted 85 shade trees and street trees.

Also in March 2013 a Little Free Library was donated.

The annual ice cream social is being organized as the Chosewood Park Frozewood Day Ice Cream Festival in July.
