= Tuxedo Park, Atlanta =

Historic neighborhood of Atlanta, Georgia, United States

Coordinates: 33°51′12″N 84°23′47″W

Tuxedo Park is a neighborhood of Atlanta in the Buckhead area of the city.

One-time Atlanta mayor Robert Maddox's house "Woodhaven" was located in the area from 1911 to 1963, when the present Georgia Governor's Mansion was built here.

The neighborhood is part of NPU A and is bounded by:

- Blackland Road and Putnam Drive and the neighborhood of Chastain Park on the north
- Northside Drive and the Kingswood neighborhood on the west
- Moore's Mill Road and the Argonne Forest neighborhood on the south
- Habersham Road and the South Tuxedo Park neighborhood on the southeast
- Lake Forest Drive and the East Chastain Park neighborhood on the northeast

== Residents ==
- Kelly Loeffler, United States Senator from Georgia (2020-2021)
- Robert Woodruff
- Nathan Deal
- Bobby Jones
- Matt Ryan
- Vince Vaughn
- Robert Downey, Jr.
- Kenny Rogers
