= Gold Panda =

English record producer and songwriter (born 1980)

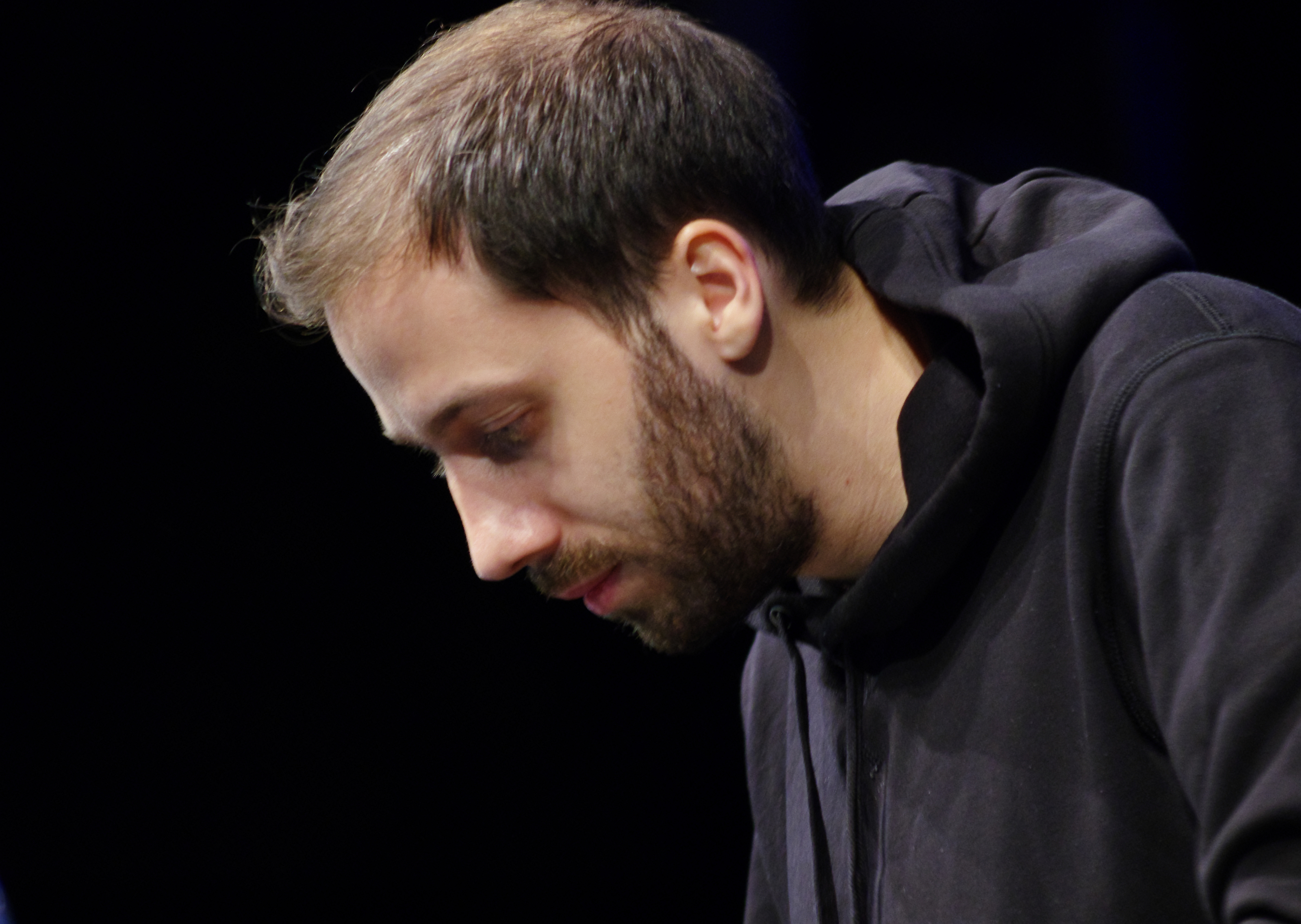
- Gold Panda performing at Haldern Pop in 2013

Background information
- Born: Derwin Dicker; 1980 (age 45–46); Peckham, London, England
- Origin: Chelmsford, Essex, England
- Genres: Electronic; UK garage; post-dubstep; folktronica; ambient; microhouse; minimal techno
- Occupations: Record producer; songwriter
- Instrument: Akai MPC
- Labels: Ghostly; Wichita; City Slang

Derwin Schlecker (born Derwin Dicker, 1980), professionally known as Gold Panda, is an English electronic music producer and songwriter. Derwin Dicker also performs house music as DJ Jenifa.

== Early life ==
Derwin Schlecker was born as Derwin Dicker in 1980 in Peckham, London and was raised in Chelmsford, Essex. He lived in Japan and studied at the School of Oriental and African Studies at the University of London.

== Career ==
Gold Panda released several small-issue 7" records and singles in 2009, and in 2010 he signed with Ghostly International to release his debut full-length Lucky Shiner. In 2013, Gold Panda released his second album, Half of Where You Live.

On 27 May 2016, Gold Panda's third album Good Luck and Do Your Best was released via City Slang.

Gold Panda released a new single on 16 October 2020 titled Most Books That I've Never Read.

Six years later, Gold Panda released another City Slang album, which was The Work on 11 November 2022 and is Gold Panda's sixth studio album.

== Discography ==
=== Studio albums ===
- Lucky Shiner (CD/12-inch, Ghostly International/Notown, September 2010)
- Half of Where You Live (CD/12-inch, Ghostly International/Notown, June 2013)
- Good Luck and Do Your Best (City Slang, May 2016)
- On Reflection (with Jas Shaw, as Selling) (City Slang, October 2018)
- Jag Trax (as DJ Jenifa), (Self-released, March 2019)
- The Work (City Slang, November 2022)
- TON UP (Studio Barnhus, June 2026)

=== Extended plays ===
- Before (CDR, self-released, limited to 300 copies, 2009)
- Miyamae (12-inch, Various Production, July 2009)
- You (12-inch, Ghostly International, limited to 500 copies, June 2010)
- Snow & Taxis (12-inch, Ghostly, limited, November 2010)
- Marriage (12-inch, Ghostly, limited to 600 copies for Record Store Day, March 2011)
- DJ-Kicks: An Iceberg Hurled Northward Through Clouds (12-inch, Studio !K7, October 2011)
- Trust (12-inch, Notown, February 2013)
- Reprise (12-inch, Notown, October 2013)
- Your Good Times Are Just Beginning (City Slang, November 2016)
- I Only Know Nothing (Self-released, October 2024)

=== Singles ===
- "Quitter's Raga" (CDR/7-inch, Make Mine, limited to 500 copies, August 2009)
- "You" / "Before We Talked" (CDR/7-inch, Notown, 2010)
- "Mountain" / "Financial District" (7-inch, Ghostly/Notown, limited to 1200 copies, May 2012)
- "Brazil" (MP3, Ghostly, April 2013)
- "Clarke's Dream" (MP3, self-released, August 2014)
- "Kingdom" (CD/12-inch, City Slang, July 2016)
- "Transactional Relationship" (MP3, City Slang, August 2019)
- "The Corner" (feat. Open Mike Eagle, Infinite Livez, & McKinley Dixon) (City Slang, June 2023)
- "Cool Bro" (with Infinite Livez & FROST) (MP3, self-released, June 2024)
- "222" / "0.2" (6-inch, self-released, August 2024)
- "Us Two" (with Tourist) (MP3, Monday Records, October 2024)
- "Stay Here" (with Fort Romeau) (12-inch, Studio Barnhus, November 2024)
- "Plain Sailing" (MP3, self-released, June 2025)
- "Untitled 1000 / 500 Tool" (MP3, self-released, July 2025)
- "El Fantasma / El Espíritu" (with Fort Romeau) (12-inch, Permanent Vacation, January 2026)

=== Compilations/mixes ===
- Unreleased Medical Journal (CDR, self-released, limited, June 2010)
- Companion (CDR, self-released, limited, April 2010; CD, Ghostly, March 2011): early material compilation, includes the 2009 EPs Before, Miyamae, and Quitter's Raga and one extra track ("Police")
  - Re-released 22 March 2011 by Ghostly International
- Gold Panda: DJ-Kicks (DJ mix, CD/12-inch, Studio !K7, October 2011)

=== Tracks on compilation albums ===
- "Like Totally" on The Music Sounds Better With Huw (MP3, Wichita Recordings, May 2009)
- "Peaky Caps" on We'll Never Stop Living This Way: A Ghostly Primer (MP3, Ghostly International, January 2011)
- "An Iceberg Hurled Northward Through Clouds (Exclusive)" on DJ-Kicks: The Exclusives (CD, K7 Records, March 2012)
- "Quitters Raga" on Late Night Tales: Belle and Sebastian Vol. II by Belle and Sebastian
- "If You Knew (Reprise Long Live Take)" on Get Physical Music Presents: Body Language, Vol. 14 By andhim (MP3, Get Physical Music GmbH, April 2014) & on Eclettica 2 By Glass Coffee (CD, Barlas Agg Nikolaos Music, November 2014)
- "Before Tigers (Gold Panda Remix)" by HEALTH & Gold Panda on Late Night Tales: Jon Hopkins by Jon Hopkins (CD, Night Time Stories Ltd., September 2014)
- "Black Voices" on DJ Koze Presents Pampa, Vol. I by DJ Koze (MP3, Pampa Records, April 2016)

=== Remixes ===
- "Chrome's On It (Gold Panda Remix)" by Telepathe (V2 Records, 2009)
- "Letter To My Son (Gold Panda Remix)" by Bloc Party on Intimacy Remixed (Wichita, May 2009)
- "Bliss Out (Gold Panda Remix)" by Lemonade (Sunday Best Recordings, October 2009)
- "Earthquake (Gold Panda Remix)" by Little Boots (679 Recordings, November 2009)
- "I Have The Moon, You Have The Internet (Gold Panda Mix)" by The Field (Kompakt, December 2009)
- "Same Crescent Song (Gold Panda Remix)" by De De Mouse (Avex Music Creative Inc., April 2010)
- "Before Tigers (Gold Panda RMX)" by HEALTH on DISCO2 (Lovepump United, June 2010)
- "Everything Up (Zizou) (Gold Panda Remix)" by Zero 7 (New State Entertainment, July 2010)
- "Close (Gold Panda Remix)" by Aslope (Hobby Industries, August 2010)
- "Jamelia (Gold Panda Remix)" by Caribou on Swim Remixes (People Eating Fruit, November 2010)
- "A Rumour In Africa (Gold Panda Remix)" by Errors (Rock Action, November 2010)
- "Sadness Is A Blessing (Gold Panda Remix)" by Lykke Li (Atlantic, May 2011)
- "Brazil (Gold Panda Remix)" by Luke Abbott (Border Community, December 2011)
- "Saundersfoot (Gold Panda Remix)" by Minotaur Shock (Melodic, 2012)
- "I Tried So Hard (Gold Panda Remix)" by Night Works (Loose Lips Records, August 2012)
- "Brook (Gold Panda Remix)" by Throwing Snow on Clamor EP (Snowfall, August 2012)
- "Straight & Arrow (Gold Panda Remix)" by FaltyDL (Ninja Tune, November 2012)
- "Numb (Gold Panda Remix)" by Go Dark (Bella Union, December 2018)
- "And Yet (Gold Panda Remix)" by Will Samson (Human Chorus, September 2023)
- "slice (Gold Panda Remix)" by Seb Wildblood and Laraaji (all my thoughts, November 2023)
- "Nice to See U (Gold Panda Rework)" by kelz (Bayonet Records, March 2024)
- "Tarifa (Gold Panda Remix)" by Blanco White (Nettwerk Music Group, April 2024)
- "Eating the Rich (Gold Panda Remix)" by Echo Juliet (Invisible IDs, April 2024)
- "Pose Beams (Gold Panda Remix)" by Ezra Feinberg (Tonal Union, September 2024)
- "New Time (Gold Panda Remix)" by Benjamin Fröhlich (Permanent Vacation, February 2025)
- "PIECES, FALLING (Gold Panda Remix)" by Bi Disc (Bigamo Music, March 2025)
