= Carey Park =

Carey Park may refer to:

- Carey Park, Trelawny Parish, Jamaica
- Carey Park, Cornwall, United Kingdom
- Carey Park (Atlanta), a neighborhood in Atlanta, Georgia, United States
- Carey Park, Western Australia, a suburb of the city of Bunbury
- Carey Park, part of Northwich Woodlands
