= Scotts Crossing =

Neighborhood of Atlanta, Georgia

Scotts Crossing is a neighborhood on the Upper Westside of Atlanta.

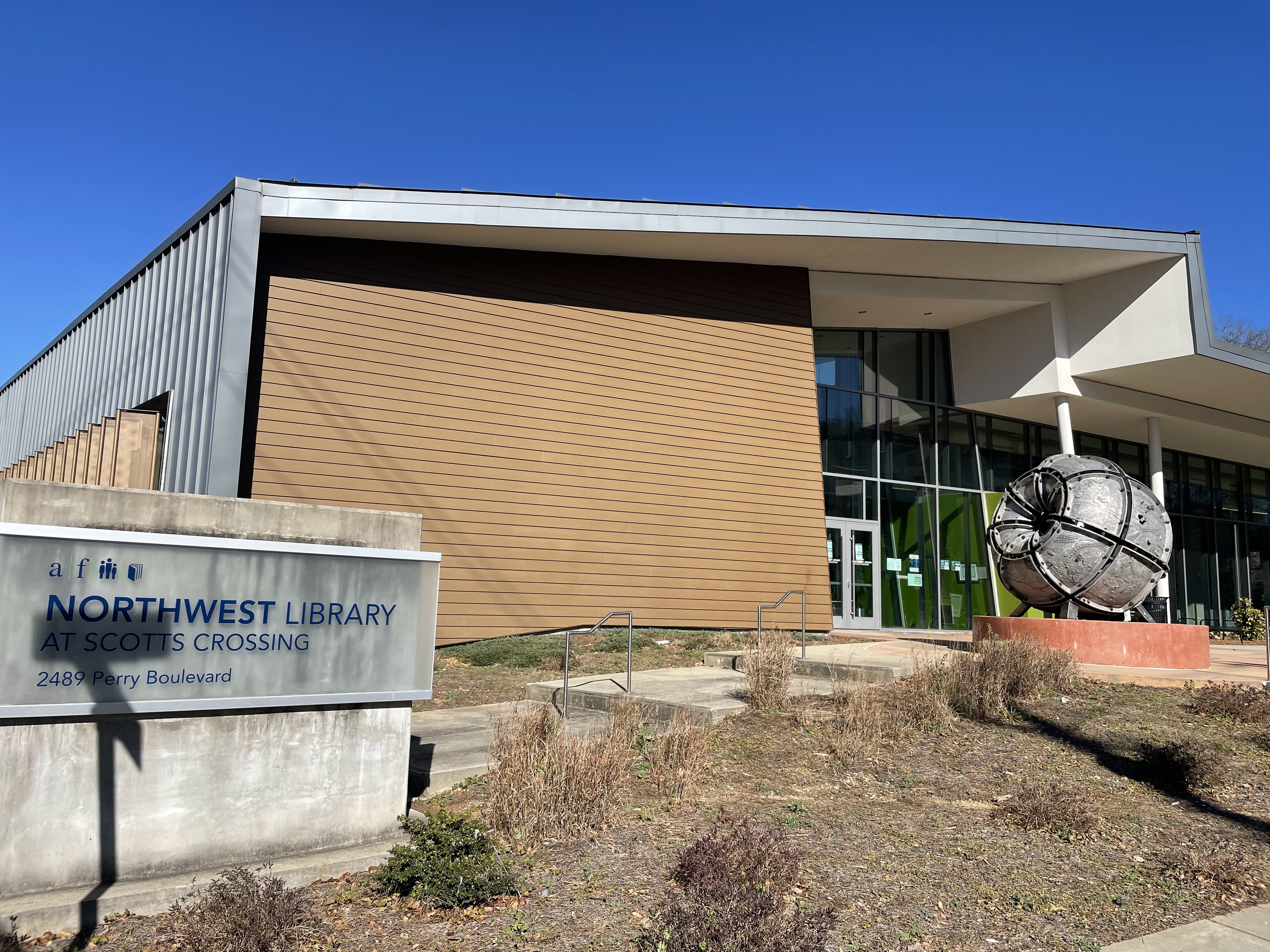
Northwest Library at Scott's Crossing

It is bordered by:

- Lincoln Homes on the west
- Carver Hills and Carey Park (Atlanta) on the south
- Norfolk Southern Railway line and the Riverside neighborhood on the north

The population is 1,165, more than 90% African American. As of 2009, Scotts Crossing has a lower average household income ($24,947) than the city of Atlanta as a whole ($49,981).

Negro league baseball star James "Red" Moore lived in Scotts Crossing as of February 2011.
