= Work Work (disambiguation) =

"Work Work" is the clean version of Britney Spears' 2013 song "Work Bitch".

Work Work may also refer to:

- "Work Work" (2005), a song by the Rakes from Capture/Release
- "Work Work" (2008), a song by N-Dubz from Uncle B
- "Work Work" (2014), a song by Clipping from CLPPNG

== See also ==
- Work (disambiguation)
