= Work of Art =

Work of Art, or variations, may refer to:

- Work of art, an aesthetic item or artistic creation

== Literature ==
- Work of Art, a 1934 novel by Sinclair Lewis
- "The Work of Art in the Age of Mechanical Reproduction", a 1935 essay by Walter Benjamin
- "A Work of Art", a 1956 science fiction short story by James Blish

== Other uses ==
- "Work of Art (Da Vinci)", a 2007 song by Måns Zelmerlöw
- Work of Art (album), a 2023 album by Asake
- Work of Art, an unreleased album by Deborah Cox
- Work of Art: The Next Great Artist, an American reality competition television show

== See also ==
- Artwork (disambiguation)
- Work (disambiguation)
- Art (disambiguation)
