= Chastain Park =

City park in Atlanta, Georgia, United States of America

Coordinates: 33.876772°N 84.396157°W

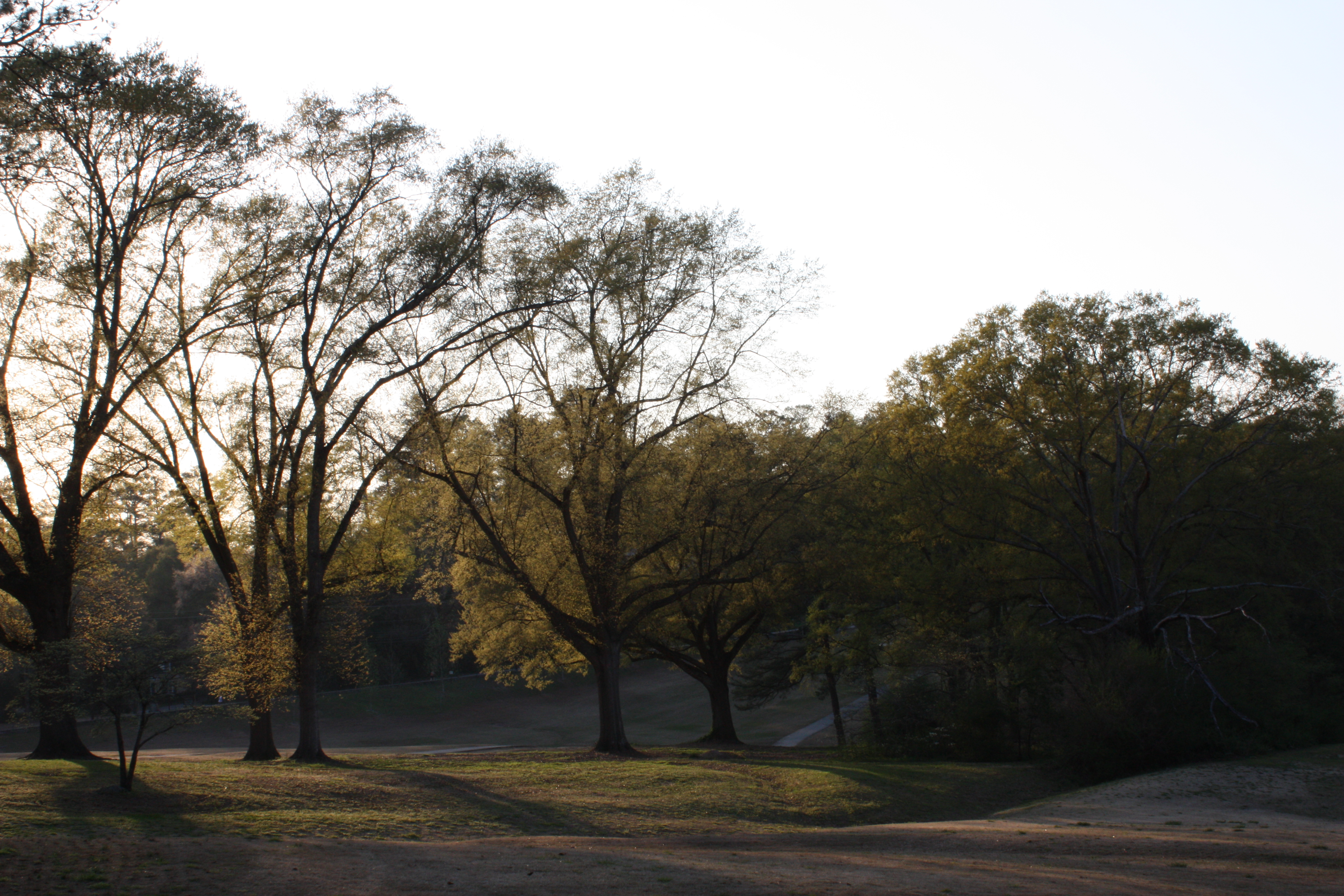
- Interactive map of Chastain Park
- Location: Atlanta, Georgia
- Area: 268 acres (1.08 km^{2})
- Created: 1940
- Operator: City of Atlanta; Chastain Park Conservancy
- Visitors: 1 million (2014)

Chastain Memorial Park (originally known as the North Fulton Park, commonly known as Chastain Park) is the second-largest city park in Atlanta, Georgia. It is a 268-acre (1.08 km^{2}) park near the northern edge of the city. Included in the park are jogging paths, playgrounds, NYO (Northside Youth Organization) ball fields, tennis courts, a golf course, swimming pool, horse park, and an outdoor amphitheater.

== Location ==
The wedge-shaped park is bounded on the east side by Lake Forrest Drive, on the west-southwest side by Powers Ferry Road, and on the north-northwest end by West Wieuca Road. Nancy Creek bisects the park, flowing from east to west. It is surrounded by forested neighborhoods in the Buckhead area of the city, and is northwest of the original Buckhead Village and the uptown Lenox area.

Chastain Park is also a neighborhood on the west side of the park (across Powers Ferry Road to the west). The neighborhood is bordered by the city of Sandy Springs on the north, and by the Atlanta neighborhoods of Mount Paran/Northside on the west across Northside Drive and Tuxedo Park on the south. It is part of NPU A. The population was 2,398 as of 2010.

== History ==
The land was originally inhabited by the Muscogee (Creek) people near the Nancy Creek floodplain until they were forced to cede the territory under the 1821 Treaty of Indian Springs. In 1900, Fulton County purchased the acreage to establish an almshouse complex for impoverished county residents.

The facility opened in 1911, featuring a brick Neoclassical Revival-style main building designed by the Atlanta architectural firm Morgan and Dillon. Operating under racial segregation laws of the era, the primary brick building housed white residents (becoming the campus of The Galloway School in 1969), while a separate frame building housed African American residents (later preserved as the Chastain Arts Center). Concurrently, a pauper's graveyard known as the North Fulton Park Cemetery was established on the grounds; a 2014 ground-penetrating radar survey confirmed the ongoing preservation of 86 unmarked gravesites situated next to the modern golf course's fifth green.

In 1940, under the direction of Fulton County Commissioner Troy Green Chastain, Sr., 268 acres of the property were set aside to construct a public recreational area named "North Fulton Park." Developed with labor assistance from the Works Progress Administration (WPA), the complex featured an 18-hole golf course, a bathhouse, a gymnasium, horse stables, and an outdoor amphitheater built into a natural hillside bowl, which hosted its first concert in 1944. Commissioner Chastain died on August 25, 1945. To honor his role in developing the space, the Fulton County Commission renamed the area "Chastain Memorial Park" on September 25, 1946. Municipal jurisdiction and ownership of the park was transferred from the county to the City of Atlanta in 1952 under the provisions of the Plan of Improvement annexation framework.

== Features ==
=== Path ===
The PATH Foundation began building a dedicated pedestrian trail system within Chastain Park in 1994. The network has since expanded into a paved, 3.92-mile greenway perimeter circuit encircling the park terrain and the North Fulton Golf Course. Designated as one of the foundation's busiest trail systems, the infrastructure is split into two primary walking and jogging loops: one circling the active golf course and a second situated north of the amphitheater and playground complexes.

=== Pool ===
A public swimming complex is located within the northern section of the park. Operating via a partnership between the City of Atlanta and the localized non-profit Chastain Park Athletic Club (CPAC), the facility is free to the public during designated weekday morning hours, while requiring an admission fee or membership outside of those windows. It also serves as the home training facility for the club's competitive youth and adult summer league swim teams.
