= The Works =

The Works may refer to:

== Music ==
- The Works (Queen album), 1984 album by the British rock band Queen
- The Works (Nik Kershaw album), 1989 album by singer-songwriter Nik Kershaw
- The Works (Saga album), 1991 greatest hit compilation
- The Works (Phil Beer album), 1998 folk music album
- The Works (Jon Stevens album), a 2005 acoustic album
- The Works (The Corrs album), 2007 compilation album
- The Works (Bananarama album), 2007 retrospective of Bananarama's music
- The Works (Faith No More album), 2008 compilation of Faith No More songs
- The Works (The Wildhearts album), 2008 compilation album
- The Works (Echo & the Bunnymen album), 2008 boxed set compilation album
- The Works (Jonatha Brooke album), 2008 folk-rock album
- The Works (Spiers and Boden album), 2011 folk music album
- The Works Recording Studio, a studio near Manchester, UK

== Television ==
- The Works (1990s TV series), RTÉ show presented by Mary Kingston
- The Works (Irish TV programme), an Irish arts television programme presented by John Kelly that has aired on RTÉ since 2011
- The Works (U.S. TV program), a 2008 American television program that aired on History Channel
- The Works (TV network), a movie channel from MGM

== Other uses ==
- The Works (film), an uncompleted animated film
- The Works (mixed-use development), a mixed-use development in Atlanta, Georgia
- The Works (retailer), a UK-based discount book retailer
- The Works (science museum), a science museum in Bloomington, Minnesota
- The Works Art & Design Festival, a festival in Edmonton, Canada
- A fictional location in the Star Wars prequel era
- An alternate name for supreme pizza, which consists of a mix of meat and vegetable toppings.

== See also ==
- Works (disambiguation)
- Work (disambiguation)
