= Lucky Shiner =

Studio album by Gold Panda
- Released: 7 September 2010
- Recorded: December 2009 – January 2010
- Genre: Electronic
- Length: 47:05
- Label: Ghostly International
- Producer: Gold Panda

Gold Panda chronology
Lucky Shiner (2010)	Half of Where You Live (2013)

Singles from Lucky Shiner
- 1. "You" Released: 15 June 2010

Lucky Shiner is the debut studio album by English electronic music producer Gold Panda. It was released on 7 September 2010 through Ghostly International in the United States, while Notown Records released it on 12 October 2010 in the United Kingdom.

== Production ==
Gold Panda recorded Lucky Shiner in two weeks over Christmas at his aunt and uncle's house in the Essex countryside. The album is named after his grandmother.

== Critical reception ==
Professional ratings
Aggregate scores
Source	Rating
AnyDecentMusic?	7.6/10
Metacritic	80/100
Review scores
Source	Rating
AllMusic	4/5 stars
The Guardian	4/5 stars
The Irish Times	4/5 stars
Mojo	4/5 stars
MSN Music (Expert Witness)	A−
NME	8/10
Pitchfork	8.3/10
Q	4/5 stars
Spin	7/10
XLR8R	8/10

At Metacritic, which assigns a weighted average score out of 100 to reviews from mainstream critics, Lucky Shiner received an average score of 80 based on 22 reviews, indicating "generally favorable reviews".

It received an honorable mention at Pitchfork's "Albums of the Year 2010" list. MusicOMH named it the 50th best album of 2010. Stereogum named it the 39th best album of 2010.

== Track listing ==
All tracks are written by Gold Panda

No.	Title	Length
1.	"You"	3:36
2.	"Vanilla Minus"	4:03
3.	"Parents"	2:01
4.	"Same Dream China"	4:14
5.	"Snow & Taxis"	4:40
6.	"Before We Talked"	5:20
7.	"Marriage"	4:41
8.	"I'm with You but I'm Lonely"	5:14
9.	"After We Talked"	3:39
10.	"India Lately"	6:35
11.	"You."	3:02

Digital bonus
No.	Title	Length
12.	"Greek Style"	2:58
13.	"Casio Daisy"	2:48

The Ghostly Store digital bonus
No.	Title	Length
14.	"Rush Job"	3:58

== Charts ==
Chart (2010)	Peak position
UK Albums (OCC)	155
UK Dance Albums (OCC)	8
UK Independent Albums (OCC)	20
