= Workin' =

Workin or Workin' may refer to:

- Workin' with The Miles Davis Quintet, an album recorded in 1956 by Miles Davis
- Workin' (Shirley Scott album), 1967
- "Workin" (song), 2015 single by Puff Daddy

== See also ==
- Working (disambiguation)
