= Bolton, Atlanta =

Neighborhood of Atlanta, Georgia

Coordinates: 33°48′52.0″N 84°27′23.5″W

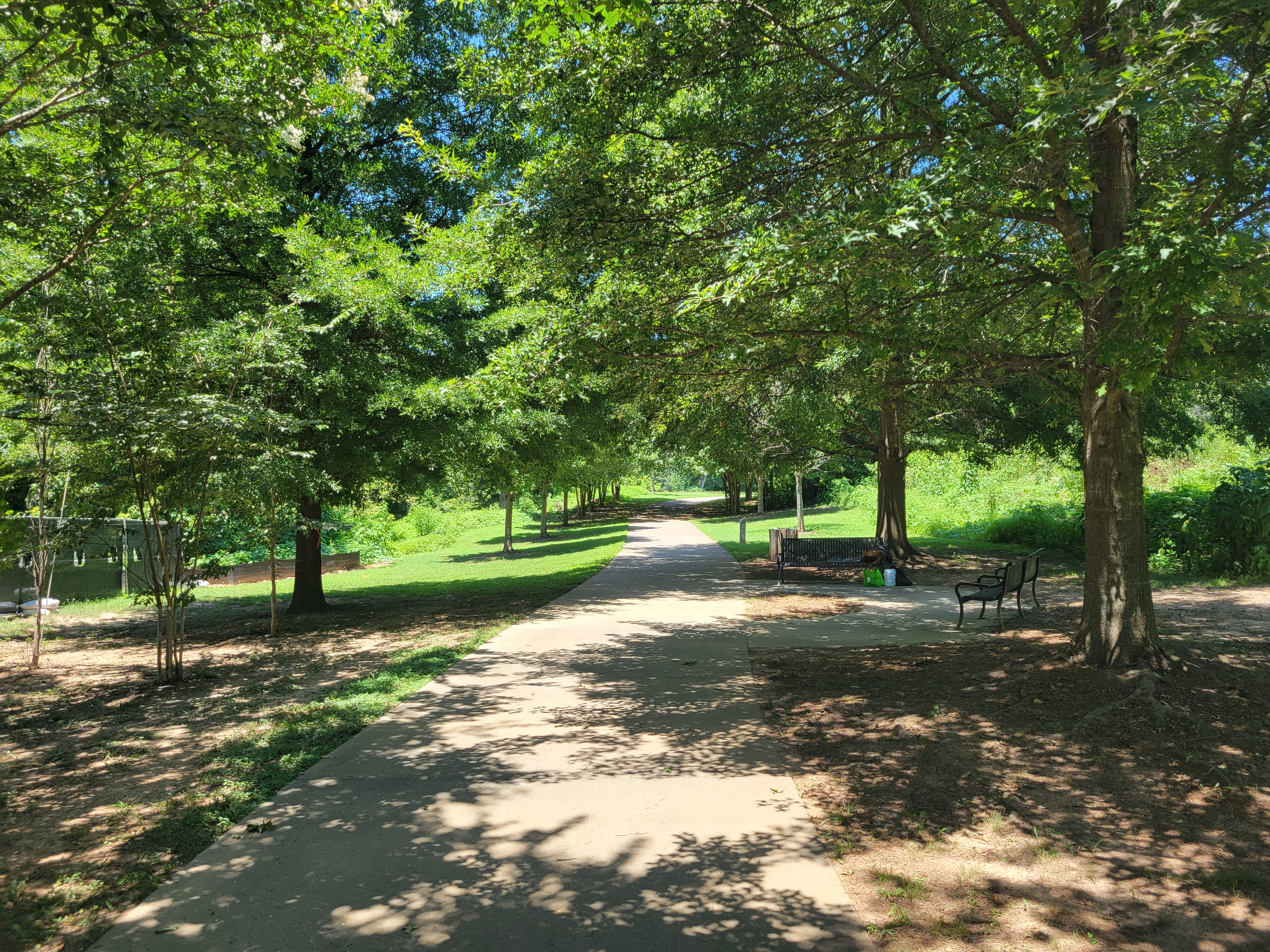
Whetstone Creek Trail

Bolton is a neighborhood of Atlanta, Georgia, in the Upper Westside, i.e. far northwest of the city. It is part of Neighborhood Planning Unit D. Bolton Road and Marietta Road are the main thoroughfares. Bolton Academy is located here and the neighborhood borders Crest View Memorial Park.

== History ==
Bolton was originally a separate settlement from Atlanta named after railroad commissioner Charles Bolton, and a stop on the railroad. Previous names of the settlement were Fulton, Boltonville and Iceville. It was incorporated in 1893. It had its own Freemason lodge. The area along with most of what is now called Buckhead was annexed to Atlanta in 1952.

== Zoned Schools ==
Bolton is part of the Atlanta Public Schools district. It is served by Bolton Academy (k-5), Sutton Middle School (6-8), and North Atlanta High School (9-12).
