= Benteen Park =

Neighborhood of Atlanta, Georgia

Coordinates: 33°42′53.9″N 84°21′55.4″W

Benteen Park is a neighborhood in southeast Atlanta, Georgia, bounded on the west by Boulevard and the Chosewood Park neighborhood, on the north by Boulevard Heights, on the east by Custer/McDonough/Gulce and on the south by Atlanta Federal Prison, which also lies in the Benteen Park neighborhood. The Atlanta Streetcar formerly served the neighborhood, with a line running down Mcdonough Ave.

The neighborhood experienced gentrification during the first decade of the 2000s, with low housing prices yet proximity to facilities in Grant Park.

In Fall 2023, the neighborhood held its first annual "Benteen Park Fall Fest" and plans to have another one in October 2024. Friends of Benteen Park was established subsequent to the 2023 Benteen Park Fall Fest in order to increase community involvement in improving Benteen Park.

A number of large developments are happening in the neighborhood as of 2023/2024, including an Epic Development Project on Boulevard near Red's Beer Garden, and other projects in nearby Chosewood Park.
