= Argonne Forest, Atlanta =

Neighborhood of Atlanta, Georgia

Coordinates: 33°50′30″N 84°24′13″W

Argonne Forest is an officially defined neighborhood of Atlanta in the Buckhead area of the city. Its population at the 2010 census was 590. The neighborhood is named after the Argonne Forest in northeastern France, where the American military was heavily involved in the 1918 Meuse-Argonne offensive of World War I.

The neighborhood is part of NPU C and is bounded by:

- West Paces Ferry Road and the Tuxedo Park neighborhood on the north
- Northside Drive on the west with the Castlewood neighborhood to the southwest
- Arden Road and the neighborhood of Arden/Habersham on the southeast

The area is covered by the Habersham Park Civic Association and Habersham Park Security Association.
