= Half of Where You Live =

Studio album by Gold Panda
- Released: 11 June 2013
- Genre: Electronic
- Length: 48:37
- Label: Ghostly International
- Producer: Gold Panda

Gold Panda chronology
| Lucky Shiner (2010) | Half of Where You Live (2013) | Good Luck and Do Your Best (2016) |

Singles from Half of Where You Live
- 1. "Brazil" Released: 15 April 2013

Professional ratings
Aggregate scores
| Source | Rating |
|---|---|
| AnyDecentMusic? | 7.2/10 |
| Metacritic | 71/100 |
Review scores
| Source | Rating |
| AllMusic | 3.5/5 stars |
| The Guardian | 3/5 stars |
| Mixmag | 4/5 |
| Mojo | 3/5 stars |
| NME | 8/10 |
| Pitchfork | 7.6/10 |
| Q | 3/5 stars |
| Rolling Stone | 3/5 stars |
| Spin | 8/10 |
| XLR8R | 9/10 |

Half of Where You Live is the second studio album by English electronic music producer Gold Panda. It was released on 11 June 2013 under Ghostly International.

== Track listing ==
All tracks are written by Gold Panda.

| No. | Title | Length |
|---|---|---|
| 1. | "Junk City II" | 6:34 |
| 2. | "An English House" | 4:21 |
| 3. | "Brazil" | 5:46 |
| 4. | "My Father in Hong Kong 1961" | 4:03 |
| 5. | "Community" | 4:33 |
| 6. | "S950" | 2:21 |
| 7. | "We Work Nights" | 5:57 |
| 8. | "Flinton" | 3:58 |
| 9. | "Enoshima" | 3:08 |
| 10. | "The Most Liveable City" | 4:31 |
| 11. | "Reprise" | 3:27 |

Japanese edition bonus tracks
| No. | Title | Length |
|---|---|---|
| 12. | "Heron Pond Part 1" | 2:53 |
| 13. | "Heron Pond Part 2" | 3:24 |
| 14. | "Cancel Shows" | 5:16 |
| 15. | "Indian Low Tech Start Up" | 3:15 |

== Charts ==
| Chart (2013) | Peak position |
|---|---|
| UK Albums (OCC) | 155 |
| UK Dance Albums (OCC) | 17 |
| UK Independent Albums (OCC) | 33 |
| US Heatseekers Albums (Billboard) | 41 |
