= Whittier Mill Village =

- Whittier Mills Historic District
- U.S. National Register of Historic Places
- U.S. Historic district
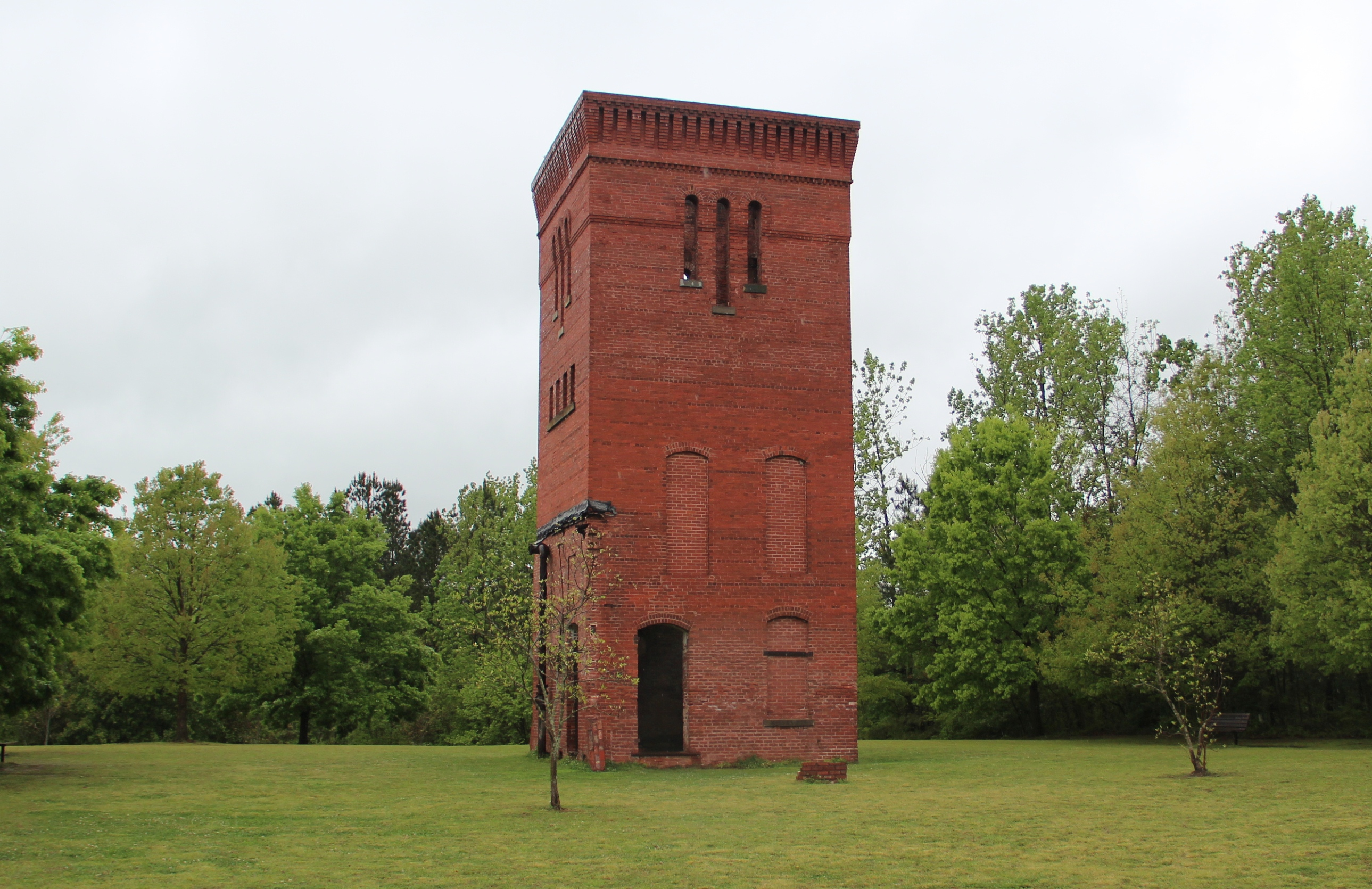
- Whittier Mill Park

- Location within Metro Atlanta
- Location: Roughly the jct. of Bolton Rd. and Parrot Ave., approx. 7 mi. NW of central business district of Atlanta, Georgia
- Coordinates: 33.810713°N 84.477443°W
- Area: 30 acres (12 ha)
- Architect: Parsons and Wait
- Architectural style: Bungalow/Craftsman, Colonial Revival
- NRHP reference No.: 01000972
- Added to NRHP: September 13, 2001

Whittier Mill Village, originally Chattahoochee, a recognized neighborhood of Atlanta on the Upper Westside of Atlanta. It is roughly contiguous with the Whittier Mills Historic District, both locally- and NRHP-listed. The mill and the adjacent village were founded in 1895. The area is a good example of a Southern mill and village. Only remnants of the mill remain. However, the housing areas mostly have survived.

In 2001, the historic district included 98 contributing buildings, one contributing structure, and one contributing site, as well as 16 non-contributing buildings.
