= Good Luck and Do Your Best =

Studio album by Gold Panda
- Released: 27 May 2016
- Genre: Electronic
- Length: 44:31
- Label: City Slang
- Producer: Gold Panda; Luke Abbott

Gold Panda chronology
Half of Where You Live (2013)	Good Luck and Do Your Best (2016)	Jag Trax (as DJ Jenifa) (2019)

Professional ratings
Aggregate scores
Source	Rating
AnyDecentMusic?	7.5/10
Metacritic	79/100
Review scores
Source	Rating
AllMusic	4/5 stars
Consequence of Sound	B
Exclaim!	8/10
The Guardian	4/5 stars
The Irish Times	3/5 stars
Pitchfork	7.4/10
PopMatters	8/10
Q	3/5 stars
Record Collector	5/5 stars
Resident Advisor	3.6/5

Good Luck and Do Your Best is the third studio album by English electronic music producer Gold Panda. The album was inspired by the parting words of a taxi driver on the producer's visit to Japan. It was released through City Slang on 27 May 2016.

== Track listing ==
Good Luck and Do Your Best track listing
No.	Title	Length
1.	"Metal Bird"	3:42
2.	"In My Car"	4:27
3.	"Chiba Nights"	4:01
4.	"Pink & Green"	4:13
5.	"Song for a Dead Friend"	4:19
6.	"I Am Real Punk"	4:29
7.	"Autumn Fall"	3:39
8.	"Halyards"	4:11
9.	"Time Eater"	4:52
10.	"Unthank"	2:46
11.	"Your Good Times Are Just Beginning"	3:46

Bandcamp edition bonus track
No.	Title	Artist(s)	Length
12.	"Time Eater"	Ssighborggg featuring Luna	6:46

== Charts ==
Chart performance for Good Luck and Do Your Best
Chart (2016)	Peak position
UK Albums (OCC)	108
UK Dance Albums (OCC)	14
UK Independent Albums (OCC)	15
US Top Dance Albums (Billboard)	10
