= 2006–2008 Southeastern United States drought =

Natural disaster in the United States

U.S. drought map 2006–2008

From 2006 to 2008, the Southeastern United States experienced a drought. It was caused by an unusually strong Bermuda High pressure and by the timing of La Niña, which causes dry conditions across the Southern United States. 2007 was particularly dry across the region, with rivers and lakes dropping to record-low levels and many of them drying up completely.

== History ==
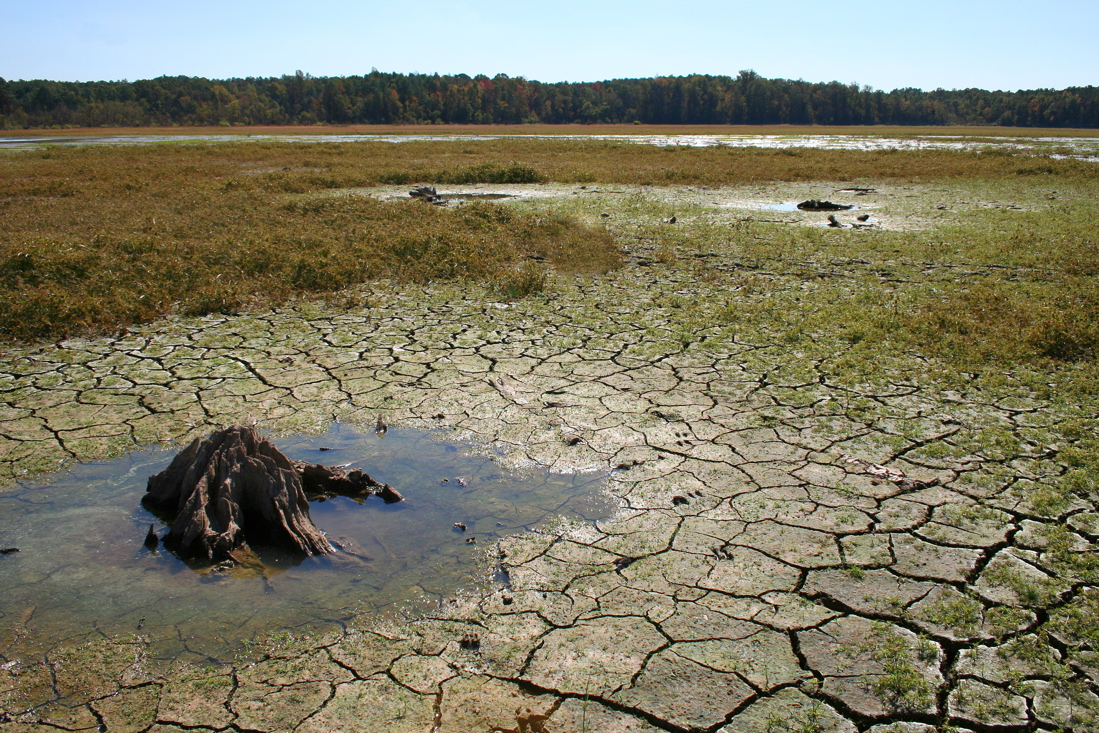
The dried lakebed of Jordan Lake, North Carolina, October 2007

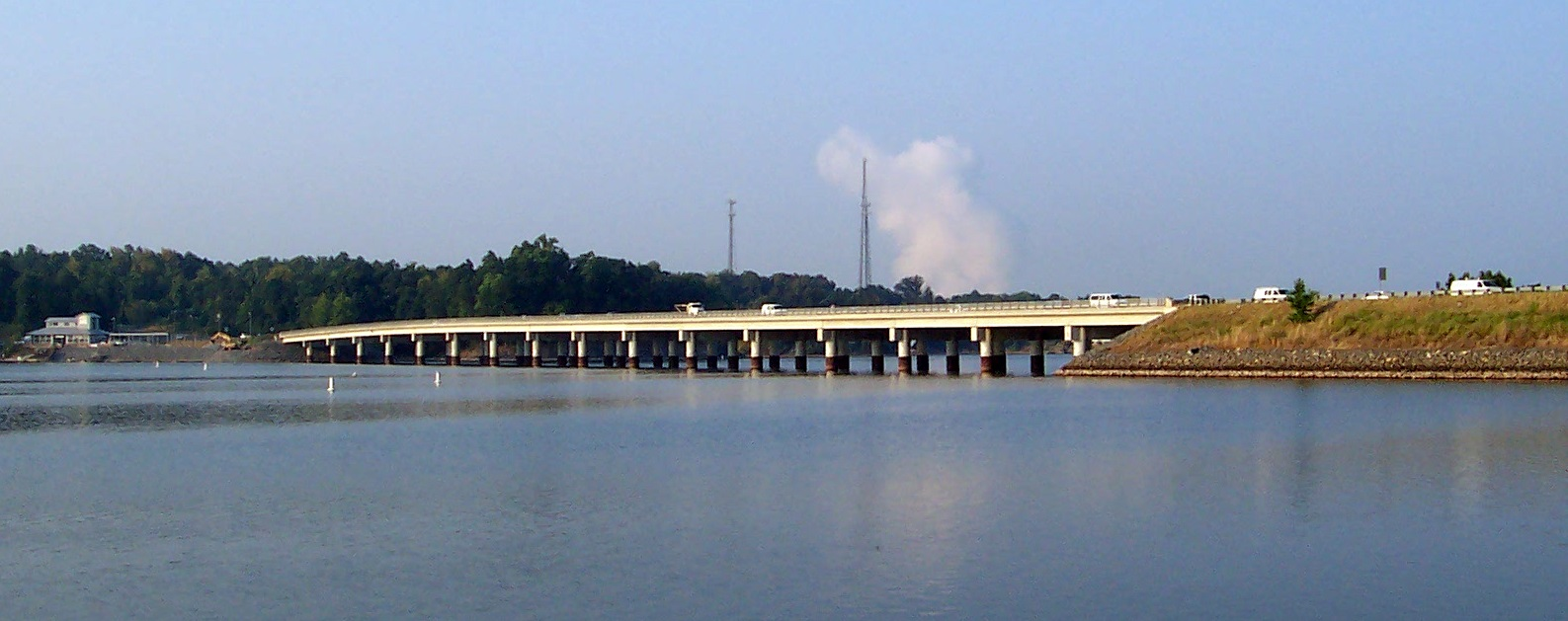
Buster Boyd Bridge shows the low water level of Lake Wylie, South Carolina in August 2007

The drought was set in motion by the weather phenomenon La Niña, which developed in 2005. La Niña caused dry weather across much of the Southeast, causing a dry winter from late 2005 to early 2006. On top of that, the Bermuda High, also known as the Azores High, a hot and dry air mass over the Atlantic, formed unusually far west, and blocked storms from entering the region, a pattern that wouldn't break until 2008. The dryness continued into 2006; however, this dryness was mild in comparison to 2007 and did not have a massive impact.

2007 was very dry across the Southeast, which received record-low rainfall during the year. Mississippi and Georgia, which usually have very wet spring seasons, each had their driest spring on record. In May 2007, the Bugaboo Fire burned near the Okefenokee Swamp along the border between Georgia and Florida, exacerbated by the drought conditions.

Summer 2007 brought a major heat wave and record-breaking wildfires across the region. The heatwave was partly caused by the drought because the dryness lowered the dew point, which raised the temperature of the air. On July 2, Lake Okeechobee in Florida fell to 8.82 feet (2.69 m), breaking the previous record for the lowest recorded water level, and on July 31, the USDA declared almost every county in Georgia a drought disaster area. August 2007 was the warmest August and second-hottest of any month across the region. Knoxville, Tennessee saw a daily maximum temperature above 100 °F (38 °C) on 16 days that month. High temperatures were still in the 90s °F (32+ °C) as late as the end of October. In North Carolina, 32 public water systems began imposing restrictions on water usage. In August 2007, over 75% of the state of Alabama was in extreme or exceptional drought.

The drought peaked in October, with over 70% of the Southeast in the worst category of drought, known as D4 (Exceptional). 2007 was the region's second-driest year as a whole. North Carolina had its driest calendar year ever; several towns nearly ran out of water. On October 15, North Carolina Governor Michael F. Easley called for residents to only use water for essential purposes, saying that he may need to call for a state of emergency if conservation efforts fell short. By October 23, water systems in 17 North Carolina cities were about 100 days from running out of water.

On October 20, when Atlanta had about 90 days of water left, Georgia Governor Sonny Perdue declared a state of emergency in 85 counties in the northern part of the state and requested that President George W. Bush declare the area a major disaster area. Perdue said he wanted the United States Army Corps of Engineers (USACE) to stop up Buford Dam, which would prevent water from being diverted out of Lake Lanier, which is the primary water source for metro Atlanta. The water is normally diverted downstream from Lake Lanier to the Chattahoochee River, and further downstream to Alabama and Florida, which were also experiencing droughts. In those states, the water was needed to preserve species of endangered mussels and fish. The disaster declaration would allow the USACE to ignore normal regulations and close the Buford Dam, thus conserving water for human use in Georgia at the risk of damaging downstream ecosystems and reducing water supplies in Alabama and Florida. Perdue sued the USACE in an attempt to get a court order to force the water in Lake Lanier to go primarily to Atlanta-area residents on October criticized the continued diversion of water from Lake Lanier, saying, "I don't believe that was the regional intent of the Endangered Species Act, that water would be diverted away from potential human use in order to protect endangered species." The dispute contributed to the ongoing tri-state water dispute between Georgia, Florida, and Alabama.

In Raleigh, North Carolina, there were bans on car washing (outside of permitted facilities) and filling new swimming pools.

On November 13, 2007, Georgia Governor Perdue hosted a large prayer gathering at the Georgia State Capitol, where hundreds of people prayed for rain. At this time, the water level in Lake Lanier was down to 20 feet (6.1 m) below its usual level. It reached a historic low of 1,050.75 feet (320.27 m) on December 28, 2007, breaking the previous record of 1,052 feet (321 m) set during a different drought in 1981. Sections of the sandy bottom of Lake Lanier were revealed for the first time since the lake was created in the 1950s.

As the drought progressed, the Northwind Equestrian Center in Cherokee County, Georgia rescued many horses from people who could no longer afford to feed their animals because hay prices had increased as a result of failing hay crops in the region.

Ultimately, the Bermuda High retreated out into the Atlantic, and heavy winter rains during 2007–2008 helped alleviate the drought. A wet 2008 further improved the drought across most of the region; however, parts of Western North Carolina remained in drought until 2009. Lake Lanier recovered around September 2009 following the wet 2008 and 2009 seasons, during which there were historic floods that increased the water level by 18 feet (5.5 m).

== Impact ==
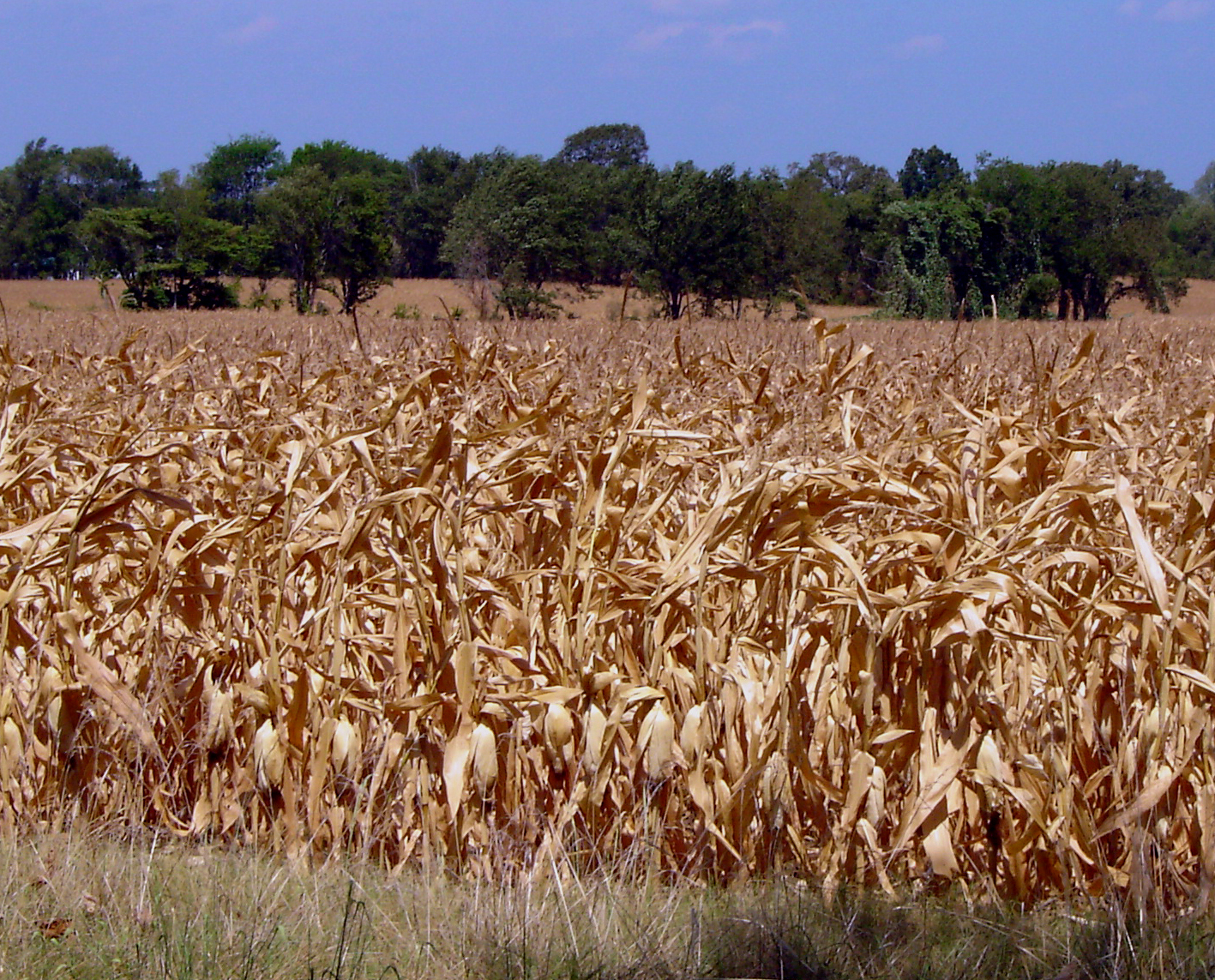
Dried up cornfield in Tennessee, August 2007

It is estimated that the drought caused an economic loss of $1.3 billion over the region, and water shortages caused the first importing of water in 100 years. Crops failed across the region, causing catastrophic impacts.

During the drought, some localities took advantage of the opportunity to work on water infrastructure. For example, when Lake Okeechobee dried up, water managers in Florida undertook a $7 million project to improve the lake bed, removing debris and invasive plants and replacing them with beneficial flora in an effort to improve the health of the ecosystem once the water ultimately returned to the lake.

As a result of the simultaneous drought and heat wave, the 2007 Atlanta Pride event moved to an indoor location and rescheduled for October, a few months later than its usual June date. Since then, organizers have continued to hold Atlanta Pride in the second week of October, partly because it is the weekend before National Coming Out Day.

In the years following the drought, public officials and others across the region began to work together to plan for future droughts.

== See also ==
- 2008 Atlanta tornado outbreak
- 2010–2013 Southern United States and Mexico drought
- 2012–2013 North American drought
- Climate of the United States
- Droughts in the United States
- Hurricane Katrina
- List of droughts
- National Integrated Drought Information System
- Tornado outbreak of February 28 – March 2, 2007
