= Work =

Work may refer to:

== Common uses ==
- Work (human activity), intentional activity people perform to support themselves, others, or the community
  - Employment, a relationship between two parties where work is paid for
  - Career, an individual's journey through learning, work and other aspects of life
  - Good works or works, a person's actions or deeds in contrast to inner qualities
  - Manual labour, physical work done by humans
  - House work, housework, or homemaking
  - Working animal, an animal trained by humans to perform tasks
- Work (physics), the product of force and displacement
  - Work (electric field), the work done on a charged particle by an electric field
  - Work (thermodynamics), energy transferred by the system to its surroundings
- Creative work, a manifestation of creative effort
  - Work of art, an artistic creation of aesthetic value

== Arts and media ==
=== Broadcast call signs ===
- WORK (FM), now WRFK (FM), an American radio station in Vermont
- WORK-LP, an American low-power TV station in New Hampshire
- WOYK, an American AM radio station in Pennsylvania, known as WORK 1932–1973

=== Music ===
==== Albums and EPs ====
- Work (album), 2010, by Shout Out Louds
- Work!, 1986, by Mulgrew Miller
- Work 1989–2002, 2002 by Orbital
- Work (EP), 2015, by Marcus Marr and Chet Faker

==== Songs ====
- "Work" (ASAP Ferg song) (2012)
- "Work" (Ateez song) (2024)
- "Work" (Iggy Azalea song) (2013)
- "Work" (Ciara song) (2009)
- "Work" (Jars of Clay song) (2006)
- "Work" (Jimmy Eat World song) (2004)
- "Work" (Millennium Parade and Ringo Sheena song) (2023)
- "Work" (Rihanna song) (2016)
- "Work" (Kelly Rowland song) (2008)
- "Work" (The Saturdays song) (2008)
- "Work" (The 2 Bears song) (2012)
- "Work", 1956, by Thelonious Monk and Sonny Rollins from Thelonious Monk and Sonny Rollins
- "Work", 1980, by Bob Marley and the Wailers from Uprising
- "Work", 1990, by Lou Reed and John Cale from Songs for Drella
- "Work", 1998, by Gang Starr from Moment of Truth
- "Work", 2006, by Mac Boney from Grand Hustle Presents: In da Streetz Volume 4
- "Work", 2013, by Jme
- "Work", 2017, by Charlotte Day Wilson
- "Work", 2018, by ionnalee from Everyone Afraid to Be Forgotten
- "Work", 2018, by Little Big Town from Wanderlust
- "Work", 2019, by Psapp from Tourists
- "Work", 2025, by P1Harmony from Duh!

==== Other uses in music ====
- The Work (band), an English post-punk rock group
- Work Group, an American record label

=== Other arts and media ===
- Work (film), a 1915 silent film starring Charlie Chaplin
- Work (painting), by Ford Madox Brown
- "Work" (The Armando Iannucci Shows), a television episode
- "Work" (Bluey), a television episode
- Work: A Story of Experience, an 1873 novel by Louisa May Alcott
- Work, a 1978 play by Ron Milner

== People with the surname ==
- Delta Work (born 1976), Mexican-American drag queen
- Jimmy Work (1924–2018), American singer-songwriter
- John Work (disambiguation), listing several people with that name
- Milton Work (1864–1934), American authority on bridge and whist

== Other uses ==
- Work (professional wrestling), a term with several meanings
- Work (vehicle), an electric vehicle by StreetScooter
- Slack Technologies's NYSE symbol

== See also ==
- Working (disambiguation)
- Works (disambiguation)
- The Works (disambiguation)
- Work of art (disambiguation)
- Work Work (disambiguation)
- Labour (disambiguation)
