= John Work =

John Work may refer to:

- John Work (fur trader) (1792–1861), chief factor in Hudson's Bay Company and member of a founding family of Victoria, British Columbia
- John M. Work (1869–1961), American socialist and newspaper editor
- John Wesley Work Jr. (1871–1925), American song collector and choral director
- John Wesley Work III (1901–1967), American composer and scholar
- John Work House and Mill Site, a historic gristmill in Charlestown, Indiana

== See also ==
- John Work Garrett (1820–1884), American banker and railroad executive
- John Work Scott (1807–1879), president of Washington College
