= Carey Park, Atlanta =

Neighborhood in Atlanta, Georgia, US

Coordinates: 33°47′9.01″N 84°28′20.43″W

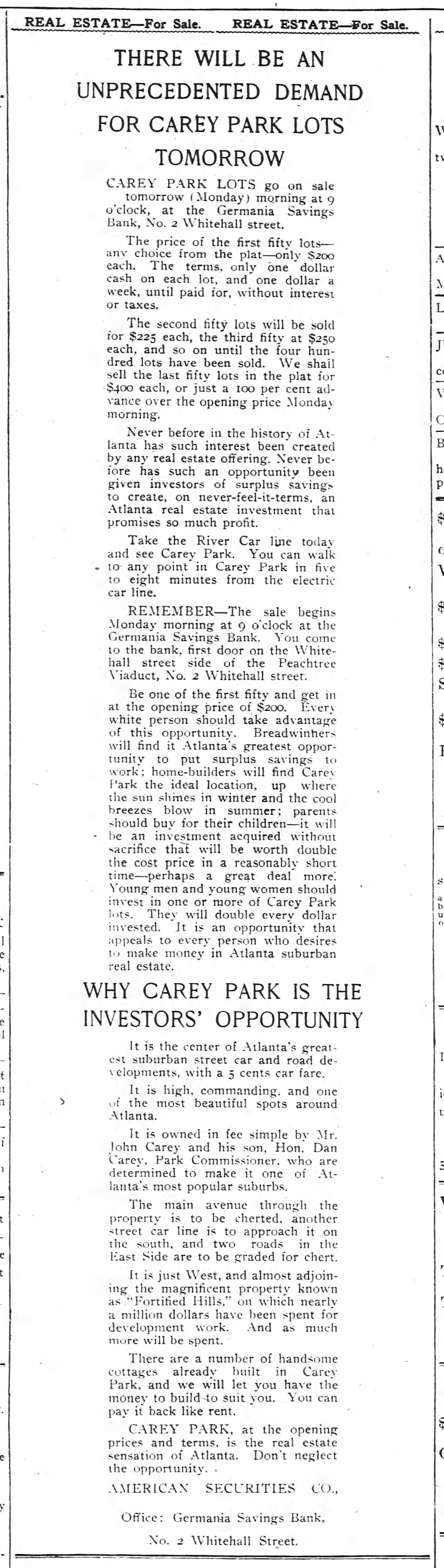
1913 Advertisement for lot sales in Carey Park

Carey Park is a neighborhood on the Upper Westside of Atlanta with a population of 1,739.

It is bordered by:

- Scotts Crossing on the north
- Almond Park on the east
- Hill Street and the Center Hill neighborhood on the south
- James Jackson Parkway and the neighborhoods of Brookview Heights (including the former site of Bowen Homes) and Monroe Heights together formerly known as the Watts Road neighborhood, on the west.

In 1913, the neighborhood was subdivided, with lots offered for sale that same year (see advertisement). The sellers/developers were listed as "John Carey and his son Hon. Dan Carey, Park Commissioner". The 1913 advertisement offers the first fifty lots for sale for $200.00 each. The terms for these first fifty lots was advertised as being $1.00 down, "and one dollar a week, until paid for, without interest or taxes."

The city park named Carey Park is also named for John Carey. Carey was born in Montreal, served in the Confederate army and settled in Atlanta in 1880. He died in the 1920s.
