= The Works (mixed-use development) =

Coordinates: 38.801460°N 84.429550°W

The Works (also known originally as the Works at Chattahoochee) is a partially completed 80-acre (32 ha) mixed-use development on the Upper Westside of Atlanta. It is being developed by Selig Development and will consist of 40 buildings, including several historic structures. As of 2020, the project is undergoing its first phase of construction, which will see 27 acres (11 ha) developed.

== History ==
Selig Developments, a subsidiary of Selig Enterprises, announced the development on August 11, 2017. The project would see the reconversion of 40 buildings on property in Atlanta's Upper Westside owned by Selig, which had accumulated much of the area over 50 years, which would be completed in phases over the course of five to ten years. The master plan called for several acres of greenspaces, 500,000 square feet of retail, 600,000 square feet of office space, a residential area, and a boutique hotel. In 2019, Selig announced that Scofflaw Brewing would open a 9,000 square foot brewery and taproom on the property. Additionally, a 16,000 square foot food hall would be built on the development. By 2020, substantial infrastructure had been completed as part of the first phase of development, which is expected to be completed by 2022. That same year, it was reported that the full development project could take between 12 and 15 years to complete. Discussing the development, Curbed Atlanta compared the project to Ponce City Market, another mixed-use development in Atlanta.

== Bibliography ==
- Green, Josh (August 11, 2017). "First look: 'The Works' planned for 80 acres on Atlanta's Upper Westside". Curbed Atlanta. Vox Media. Archived from the original on August 23, 2017.
- Green, Josh (January 11, 2019). "Upper Westside's 'The Works' lands Scofflaw Brewing, NYC-based food hall". Curbed Atlanta. Vox Media. Archived from the original on January 12, 2019.
- Keenan, Sean Richard (January 16, 2020). "How postindustrial redo The Works is coming together on Atlanta's 'Upper Westside'". Curbed Atlanta. Vox Media. Archived from the original on January 16, 2020.
- Spivak, Caleb J. (August 11, 2017). "Selig Announces Plans For 'The Works,' an 80-Acre Mixed-Use Project". What Now Atlanta.
- Trubey, J. Scott (August 11, 2017). "Selig to transform NW Atlanta warehouses to mixed-use". The Atlanta Journal-Constitution. Cox Enterprises.
- Zusel, Yvonne (January 11, 2019). "New food hall, Scofflaw Brewing Co. taproom planned for Upper Westside". The Atlanta Journal-Constitution. Cox Enterprises.
