= Works =

Works may refer to:

== People ==
- Caddy Works (1896–1982), American college sports coach
- John D. Works (1847–1928), California senator and judge
- Samuel Works (c. 1781–1868), New York politician

== Albums ==
- Works (Pink Floyd album), a Pink Floyd album from 1983
- Works, a Gary Burton album from 1972
- Works, a Status Quo album from 1983
- Works, a John Abercrombie album from 1991
- Works, a Pat Metheny album from 1994
- Works, an Alan Parson Project album from 2002
- Works Volume 1, a 1977 Emerson, Lake & Palmer album
- Works Volume 2, a 1977 Emerson, Lake & Palmer album
- The Works, a 1984 Queen album

== Other uses ==
- Good works, a topic in Christian theology
- Microsoft Works, a collection of office productivity programs created by Microsoft
- IBM Works, an office suite for the IBM OS/2 operating system
- Mount Works, Victoria Land, Antarctica
- TV Works, the former name of defunct Singaporean television channel Channel i (Singaporean TV channel)

== See also ==
- The Works (disambiguation)
- Work (disambiguation)
