= Thomasville Heights =

- Atlanta Neighborhood
- Location in Metro Atlanta
- Coordinates: 33.700701°N 84.355721°W
- Country: United States
- State: Georgia
- County: Fulton
- City: Atlanta

Population (2010)
  - Total: 4,457
- Time zone: UTC-5 (EST)
  - Summer (DST): UTC-4 (EDT)
- Zip code: 30315

Thomasville Heights is a neighborhood in southeast Atlanta, Georgia.
