= 2007 North American heat wave =

Weather event in the United States

The 2007 North American heat wave started at the end of July and lasted into the first weeks of August. It was associated with a severe drought over regions of the southeastern United States and parts of the Great Lakes region.

== History ==
The major heat wave of 2007 lasted from 3 to 25 August across eastern United States, while a second wave hit the Midwest and California in October.

Temperatures surpassed 100 °F (37.8 °C) as far north as Kansas City, MO and St. Louis, MO. Dew points reached the mid-region of 70 °F (21.1 °C), creating heat index values of 108 or more in much of the affected areas. The accompanying high-pressure systems caused drought conditions, especially in areas that were already experiencing drought conditions, such as northern Alabama. It caused drought conditions in the Ohio and Mississippi River Valleys. The drought decreased soil moisture to below 98-99% of normal levels.

August 2007 turned out to be one of the 20 warmest Augusts for the United States since 1895.

A heat-wave forecast was issued in June 2007 for the Columbus, Ohio area. In Indiana, heat advisories were issued after at least four days of 90 °F (32.2 °C) days in early August. In Evansville, Indiana, August had the highest average temperature recorded until that time, 96 °F (35.6 °C), surpassed in 2012. Indianapolis had a 14-day streak of temperatures of 90 °F (32.2 °C) or higher. Paducah, Kentucky had 28 straight days of 90 °F (32 °C)-plus temperatures, a record broken in 2010.

North Carolina experienced temperatures over 100 °F (37.8 °C). In Charlotte, a record high of "104 °F (40.0 °C) degrees [was] set on 10 August 2007," that lasted until August 2012. Ten years later, the National Weather Service labeled the August 2007 heat wave one of the "Historic Heat Waves in the Carolinas." "Temperatures soared well into the 90s and 100s°F across almost all of North and South Carolina for three solid weeks, with all-time records for heat tied or broken in a number of locations," according to the National Weather Service (NWS).

Record temperatures were recorded in Rocky Mount, NC, at 106 °F (41.1 °C), Hamlet, NC at 108 °F (42.2 °C), Charlotte at 104 °F (40.0 °C), and Raleigh at 105 °F (40.6 °C). The heat index "exceeded 120 °F (49 °C) across portions of the North Carolina coastal plain." Local utilities Tennessee Valley Authority and Progress Energy Carolinas recorded the highest energy usage ever, due to air conditioning use.

The Piedmont region experienced high temperatures, while Eastern North Carolina experienced low temperatures.

A new heat island was identified in Shippensburg, Pennsylvania through monitoring hourly temperatures from 27 May to 19 September 2007.

In California, "a record summer heat wave" dried out tinder and led to dry conditions and fires in October 2007, causing one death and thousands of people to be evacuated. Ultimately, a disaster declaration was made by President George W. Bush. 25 people in California died that year from heat-related causes.

== Impact ==
A total of 105 deaths in 2007 were attributed to the heat that year in the United States. During the heat wave itself, more than 50 deaths were reported, in addition to cases of heat exhaustion and heat stroke. Most deaths (51%) occurred among those over 60 years of age and people who could not afford air conditioning.

During the Chicago Marathon in October, temperatures hit a record 88 °F (31.1 °C), causing dozens of hospitalizations and one death. In 2007, a total of 39 deaths were counted due to the heat from four adjoining states, Illinois, Missouri, Tennessee, and Kentucky.

In Philadelphia, the Pennsylvania Medical Society issued a health warning about the dangers and treatment of heat stroke.

Over "51 deaths, including 2 in South Carolina, were attributable to this heat wave." In Birmingham, Alabama, there were 18 days with a "heat index greater than or equal to 100," lower than the index during the heat wave of 1980, while 13 heat-related deaths were attributed to the August 2007 heat wave, compared to over 100 in 1980. The fewer deaths were attributed to the increased use of air-conditioning in 2007, especially among "shut in" elderly people.

== Causes ==
The heat wave was reportedly caused by several factors. First, an upper level ridge that settled over the southern plains and southeast near the Ozarks. Another cause was the troughing over the Pacific Coast and offshore Atlantic. This in turn created an Omega block pattern over the central US and caused extreme heat to build for weeks, in some cases. The ridge eventually moved back towards the west, which allowed some short-term relief for the northeastern states and Mid-Atlantic, but in the Mississippi River Valley and the southeast there remained strong heat for at least several more days.

== See also ==
- Climate of the United States
- Global warming
- List of heat waves
- Weather of 2007
