= Infinite Livez =

British rapper

Steven Henry (born 1972), known professionally as Infinite Livez, is a British rapper. Born in Bethnal Green, East London, United Kingdom, he released his debut album Bush Meat in 2004 on the Big Dada label. In 2007, he released Art Brut Fe De Yoot, a collaborative album with the Swiss jazz group Stade, also on Big Dada. He again collaborated with Stade on the 2008 album Morgan Freeman's Psychedelic Semen.

== Discography ==
- Bush Meat (Big Dada, 2004)
- (with Stade) Art Brut Fe De Yoot (Big Dada, 2007)
- (with Stade) Morgan Freeman's Psychedelic Semen (Big Dada, 2008)
