= Upper Westside, Atlanta =

Coordinates: 33.785917°N 84.411222°W

Upper Westside is a colloquial area, comprising many historical neighborhoods located in Atlanta, Georgia. The neighborhood is located in the northwestern sector of Atlanta, west of I-75 and inside I-285, to the south of Vinings and to the west of Buckhead. It was developed in the 19th century as an industrial hub.

Bolton, Riverside, and Whittier Mill Village are the largest neighborhoods comprising the district.

== Points of Interest ==
The most notable landmark is the Crest Lawn cemetery.

The Works, a planned 80-acre (32 ha) mixed-use development, is being developed by Selig in the area; it will consist of 40 buildings many of which are of historic character.
