= Boulevard Heights =

Coordinates: 33.722546°N 84.363406°W

Boulevard Heights is an urban neighborhood of Atlanta, Georgia located south of United Ave, east of Boulevard, north of Entrenchment Creek and west of the State of Georgia complex. The area is currently undergoing redevelopment to add single family homes and light commercial premises.
