= Neighborhood planning unit =

The neighborhood planning unit (NPU) is a community-scale governmental structure used in the City of Atlanta, Georgia.

== History ==
The system was established in 1974 by Atlanta's first black mayor, Maynard Holbrook Jackson. His aim was to ensure that citizens, particularly those who had been historically disenfranchised, would be in a position to comment on the structure of their communities, and to ensure that the citizens would not have this ability stripped of them by politicians who found an involved and engaged public inconvenient. Mayor Jackson had the NPU system placed within the City Charter, which can only be changed by the Georgia Legislature. That same section of the Charter also contains the Office of the Mayor as well as the Atlanta City Council.

== Structure and operations ==
There are 25 NPUs, lettered from A to Z, except U. Each NPU represents the citizens in a specified geographic area. Each NPU meets once a month to review applications for rezoning properties, varying existing zoning ordinances for certain properties, applications for liquor licenses, applications for festivals and parades, any changes to fees charged by the City, any changes to the City's Comprehensive Development Plan, and any amendments to the City's Zoning Ordinances. Once an NPU has voted on an item, that vote is then submitted to the relevant body which makes the ultimate determination with regard to that issue as the official view of the community on a topic.

NPUs operate according to a varied set of guidelines. Each NPU is permitted to create its own bylaws and the only requirement is that once a year the bylaws are voted on and every resident and business owner is permitted to vote on those bylaws. Some NPUs permit anyone to vote while other NPUs operate in a representative governmental fashion with only elected representatives voting on the issues at hand. Given the variances of demography within the City of Atlanta, the idea that a one-size fits all system of community governance would successfully reflect each community's view is unrealistic. Therefore, NPUs are permitted to operate as the citizens see fit.

Each NPU is assigned a City of Atlanta Planner who attends the monthly meetings. Planners are charged with recording official votes, responding to questions about issues of Land Use & Zoning, to present the various items that are sent by the City government for NPU review, and to assure that meetings are reasonably orderly and moderately democratic. The NPUs are staffed entirely by citizen volunteers who receive no compensation for their efforts. NPUs are not given any funding by the City for supplies or other needs.

Each NPU sends a representative to the Atlanta Planning Advisory Board, which is a citywide entity that was created contemporaneously with the NPU System. The Board addresses issues of citywide concern and sends its recommendations to the City Council and/or the Mayor depending on the issue being addressed. The Board makes various appointments to City Commissions and Boards on behalf of the citizens.

== NPU constituent neighborhoods ==
The following list shows each NPU and its constituent neighborhoods. Also included is each NPU's current leadership.

NPU-A — W. Brinkley Dickerson, Jr.

- Chastain Park, Kingswood, Margaret Mitchell, Mt. Paran Parkway, Mt. Paran/Northside, Paces, Pleasant Hill, Randall Mill, Tuxedo Park, West Paces Ferry/Northside, Whitewater Creek

NPU-B — Rebecca King

- Brookhaven, Buckhead Forest, Buckhead Village, East Chastain Park, Garden Hills, Lenox, Lindbergh/Morosgo, North Buckhead, Peachtree Heights East, Peachtree Heights West, Peachtree Hills, Peachtree Park, Pine Hills, Ridgedale Park, South Tuxedo Park

NPU-C — Zack Gober

- Arden/Habersham, Argonne Forest, Brandon, Castlewood, Channing Valley, Collier Hills, Collier Hills North, Colonial Homes, Cross Creek, Fernleaf, Hanover West, Memorial Park, Peachtree Battle Alliance, Ridgewood Heights, Springlake, Wesley Battle, Westminster/Milar, Westover Plantation, Wildwood, Woodfield, Wyngate

NPU-D — Jim Martin

- Berkeley Park, Blandtown, Bolton, Hills Park, Riverside, Underwood Hills, Whittier Mill Village

NPU-E — Courtney Smith

- Ansley Park, Ardmore, Atlantic Station, Brookwood, Brookwood Hills, Georgia Tech, Home Park, Loring Heights, Marietta Street Artery, Midtown, Sherwood Forest

NPU-F — Debbie Skopczynski

- Atkins Park, Edmund Park, Lindridge/Martin Manor, Morningside/Lenox Park, Piedmont Heights, Virginia Highland

NPU-G — Torrey Sumlin

- Almond Park, Atlanta Industrial Park, Bolton Hills, Bowen Apartments, Brookview Heights, Carey Park, Carver Hills, Chattahoochee, English Park, Lincoln Homes, Monroe Heights, Rockdale, Scotts Crossing, West Highlands

NPU-H — Khalifa Lee

- Adamsville, Baker Hills, Bakers Ferry, Bankhead Courts, Bankhead/Bolton, Boulder Park, Carroll Heights, Fairburn Heights, Fairburn Road/Wisteria Lane, Fairburn Mays, Mays, Oakcliff, Old Gordon, Ridgecrest Forest, Wildwood, Wilson Mill Meadows, Wisteria Gardens

NPU-I — Eunice Glover

- Audubon Forest, Audubon Forest West, Cascade Heights, Chalet Woods, Collier Heights, East Ardley Road, Florida Heights, Green Acres Valley, Green Forest Acres, Harland Terrace, Horseshoe Community, Ivan Hill, Magnum Manor, Peyton Forest, West Manor, Westhaven, Westwood Terrace

NPU-J — Anissa Ferrell

- Center Hill, Dixie Hills, Grove Park, Harvel Homes Community, Penelope Neighbors, West Lake

NPU-K — Dr. Jasmine Hope

- Bankhead, Hunter Hills, Knight Park/Howell Station, Mozley Park, Washington Park

NPU-L — Shade Y. Jones

- English Avenue, Vine City

NPU-M — Forrest Coley

- Castleberry Hill, Downtown, Old Fourth Ward, Sweet Auburn

NPU-N — Amy Stout

- Cabbagetown, Candler Park, Druid Hills, Inman Park, Lake Clair, Poncey-Highland, Reynoldstown

NPU-O — Joe Schleupner

- East Lake, Edgewood, Kirkwood, The Villages at East Lake

NPU-P — Reginald Rushin

- Arlington Estates, Ashley Courts, Ben Hill, Ben Hill Acres, Ben Hill Forest, Ben Hill Pines, Ben Hill Terrace, Brentwood, Briar Glen, Butner/Tell, Cascade Green, Deerwood, Elmco Estates, Fairburn, Fairburn Tell, Fairway Acres, Greenbriar Village, Heritage Valley, Huntington, Kings Forest, Lake Estates, Meadowbrook Forest, Mellwood, Mt. Gilead Woods, Niskey Cove, Niskey Lake, Old Fairburn Village, Princeton Lakes, Rue Royal, Sandlewood Estates, Tampa Park, Wildwood Forest

NPU-Q — David Getachew-Smith

- Midwest Cascade, Regency Trace

NPU-R — Rita Harden

- Adams Park, Campbellton Road, Fort Valley, Greenbriar, Laurens Valley, Pamona Park, Southwest

NPU-S — Quadrus Black

- Bush Mountain, Cascade Avenue/Road, Fort McPherson, Oakland City, Venetian Hills

NPU-T — Angela Clyde

- Ashview Heights, Atlanta University Center, Harris Chiles, Just Us, The Villages at Castleberry Hill, West End, Westview

NPU-V — Stephanie Flowers

- Adair Park, Capitol Gateway, Mechanicsville, Peoplestown, Pittsburgh, Summerhill

NPU-W — Skyler Hassan

- Benteen Park, Boulevard Heights, Custer/McDonough/Guice, East Atlanta, Grant Park, Oakland, Ormewood Park, State Facility, Woodland Hills

NPU-X — Zachary Adriaenssens

- Capitol View, Capitol View Manor, Hammond Park, Perkerson, Sylvan Hills

NPU-Y — Nicole Weiswasser

- Amal Heights, Betmar LaVilla, Chosewood Park, Englewood Manor, High Point, Joyland, Lakewood Heights, South Atlanta, The Villages at Carver

NPU-Z — Anne Phillips

- Blair Villa/Poole Creek, Browns Mill Park, Glenrose Heights, Lakewood, Leila Valley, Norwood Manor, Orchard Knob, Polar Rock, Rebel Valley Forest, Rosedale Heights, South River Gardens, Swallow Circle/Baywood, Thomasville Heights

== See also ==
- Neighborhoods of Atlanta
- Table of Atlanta neighborhoods by population
