= Intrenchment Creek Community Stewardship Council =

Watershed organization in Atlanta, Georgia

- Abbreviation: ICCSC
- Formation: 2020
- Type: Community watershed organization
- Location: Atlanta, Georgia
- Region served: Intrenchment Creek watershed
- Website: intrenchmentatl.com

The Intrenchment Creek Community Stewardship Council (ICCSC) is a community-led watershed organization in Atlanta, Georgia. It is concerned with Intrenchment Creek and the south Atlanta neighborhoods in the creek's headwaters. Community members formed it in 2020 to carry forward the recommendations of the Intrenchment Creek One Water Management Task Force. Jason Dozier, a co-founder who now represents District 4 on the Atlanta City Council, was one of its two co-chairs in 2021. In 2021 the City Council authorized a $4,950 grant to the ICCSC from the Stadium Neighborhoods Community Trust Fund, and the group incorporated as a Georgia nonprofit corporation. By June 2023 its chair was Kim Scott, executive director of Georgia WAND. State records show that the corporation was administratively dissolved in September 2023.

== History ==
The ICCSC's January 2021 grant proposal traced the group's roots to the Turner Field Community Benefits Coalition and to the Stadium Neighborhoods Livable Centers Initiative study, which began in 2015. American Rivers and ECO-Action convened the Intrenchment Creek One Water Management Task Force in 2017. The task force's report, Intrenchment Creek One Water Management Plan: Advancing Equity and Addressing Flooding and Combined Sewer Spills in the Heart of Atlanta, is dated September 2020. It closes by stating that community groups "look forward to advocating for this One Water Management Plan for the region through the newly created Intrenchment Creek Community Stewardship Council."

American Rivers and ECO-Action had earlier developed a course for residents called the Atlanta Watershed Learning Network. According to American Rivers, graduates of the course took part in the task force "and have since formed the new Intrenchment Creek Community Stewardship Council." The ICCSC's proposal says the group was launched as the task force wound down, "using a structure that was driven by community members themselves."

On November 2, 2020, SaportaReport described the ICCSC as "a nonprofit so new it hasn't even had an official kickoff event yet". The group held its kickoff meeting on November 21, 2020, with 30 participants, most of them neighborhood residents, including one member of the Atlanta City Council. In a column published February 22, 2021, Jenny Hoffner of American Rivers wrote that community leaders had "officially launched a watershed focused advocacy group".

== Purpose and scope ==
Announcing its kickoff meeting, the ICCSC called Intrenchment Creek "the primary watershed area in south and southeast Atlanta." It described its work as protecting "the ecological health of the south Atlanta communities that are connected to the creek." The same announcement said this work "is modeled on that of our allies at the Proctor Creek Stewardship Council", a group on Proctor Creek.

The announcement listed the group's goals. One was to advocate "for the fair and equitable treatment and inclusion of the underserved Intrenchment Creek communities in the planning and implementation of projects, and the enforcement of environmental policy, regulations, and laws." Another was to work with public and private partners "to implement projects for the watershed conceptualized with community input such as with the One Water Intrenchment Creek Task Force vision." The list also included urban agriculture as a response to food insecurity.

The January 2021 proposal said the ICCSC "is focused on the headwaters of the watershed". Its project abstract named Mechanicsville, Summerhill, Peoplestown and Grant Park as the communities where it would work. According to its website, the ICCSC "aims to reduce stormwater flooding" and to "restore natural areas of the Creek where possible".

The task force plan that the ICCSC was formed to advocate covered the upper basin of the creek, which the plan put at roughly 2,600 acres of southeast Atlanta. It described those headwaters as reaching from downtown Atlanta to the neighborhoods of Summerhill, Peoplestown, Mechanicsville, Pittsburgh, Grant Park and Castleberry Hill.

== Leadership ==
Jason Dozier, a resident of Mechanicsville, was a co-founder of the ICCSC. He was the contact for its January 2021 proposal, which gave his title as "Co-Chair of the Board of Directors". In February 2021 American Rivers identified Dozier and Chris Lemons as the group's co-chairs. The task force report had listed Dozier as a contributor from the Mechanicsville Civic Association and Lemons as a contributor from the Peoplestown Neighborhood Association. Dozier's biography on the Atlanta City Council website lists "serving as the co-chair of the Intrenchment Creek Community Stewardship Council" among his roles in Neighborhood Planning Unit V. He now represents District 4 on the City Council.

During public comment at the Atlanta City Council meeting of June 5, 2023, Kim Scott, executive director of Georgia WAND, described herself as "the new chair" of the ICCSC.

== Organization and legal status ==
In its January 2021 proposal the ICCSC described itself as "a community led organization" established in 2020. Its board of directors then had seven members, and the proposal said six of them were "members of the watershed". Two co-chairs led the board, and the other five members held officer or committee posts. The proposal also named four advisers serving "in a direct oversight capacity", among them leaders of ECO-Action and the South River Watershed Alliance.

The proposal said that all of the group's work was done by volunteers and that it had no central office. It named the South River Watershed Alliance as its fiscal agent. It also reported one start-up grant from American Rivers, which it said allowed the ICCSC to "function as a point of contact for the city to engage with residents on matters of watershed".

The ICCSC incorporated in Georgia on June 16, 2021, as Intrenchment Creek Community Stewardship Council Inc., a domestic nonprofit corporation, with Lemons as its registered agent. State records show that the corporation's last annual registration was for 2022 and that it was administratively dissolved on September 8, 2023.

== Funding ==
The January 2021 proposal asked the Stadium Neighborhoods Community Trust Fund for $4,950 for a project called "Launching IntrenchmentATL: Engaging Residents to Protect the Watershed". The project plan called for community outreach, four walking tours of the watershed, a tactical urbanism project with a local artist and young people, and paid technical help. The City Council had authorized the fund in 2017 to benefit Mechanicsville, Peoplestown, Pittsburgh, Summerhill and part of Grant Park. In March 2021 the fund's committee approved 21 of the 28 proposals it received, including the ICCSC's. The City Council authorized the awards in Resolution 21-R-3297, sponsored by council member Carla Smith and adopted on May 3, 2021.

== Activities ==
In the fall of 2020 the City of Atlanta was revising its stormwater ordinance. SaportaReport reported that the proposed update had set off a developers' group "as well as an emerging intown environmental group", and the article introduced Dozier as a co-founder of the ICCSC. Hoffner wrote in 2021 that the group's first campaign was "to advocate for a stronger stormwater ordinance from the City that works for everyone".

In August 2021 the ICCSC was one of 15 environmental organizations that joined the Sierra Club Georgia Chapter in a letter to Mayor Keisha Lance Bottoms and the City Council. The letter opposed proposed ordinance 21-O-0367, which would lease about 85 acres of the South River Forest to the Atlanta Police Foundation for a public safety training facility. Georgia WAND records that Scott presented on "the Peoplestown project in NPU-V" at an Intrenchment Creek Stewardship Council walking tour that same month.

== See also ==
- Intrenchment Creek
- South River (Ocmulgee River tributary)
- Atlanta Department of Watershed Management
