= Atlanta Department of Watershed Management =

Water, sewer and stormwater utility of Atlanta, Georgia

Department overview
- Formed: September 2002
- Jurisdiction: Atlanta, Georgia, and customers outside the city
- Headquarters: 72 Marietta Street NW, Atlanta
- Employees: 1,605 authorized positions (FY2024 proposed) (Note: City of Atlanta fiscal years run from July 1 to June 30; FY2024 ended June 30, 2024.)
- Annual budget: $255,982,541 departmental operating budget (FY2024 proposed) (Note: ATLbudget describes this as the department's "total proposed operating budget." The published summary does not say whether it includes debt service or transfers within the Water and Wastewater Revenue Fund.)
- Department executive: Greg Eyerly, Commissioner
- Parent Department: City of Atlanta
- Website: atlantawatershed.org

The Atlanta Department of Watershed Management (DWM) is the department of the city government of Atlanta, Georgia, that treats and delivers drinking water, collects and treats wastewater, and manages stormwater. Mayor Shirley Franklin created it in September 2002. The city had operated its water, wastewater and sewer agencies independently before then. The department draws its water from the Chattahoochee River and treats it at the Hemphill and Chattahoochee water treatment plants. It also co-owns, with Fulton County, the Atlanta-Fulton County Water Treatment Plant in north Fulton. Its three water reclamation centers, R. M. Clayton, Utoy Creek and South River, discharge treated wastewater to the Chattahoochee under a single state permit. The city describes the department as a regional public utility serving 1.2 million customers each day.

Most of the department's capital work since 1998 has been governed by two federal consent decrees that settled Clean Water Act suits brought by the EPA, the State of Georgia and the Chattahoochee Riverkeeper. Work under the combined sewer decree was completed in 2008. The sanitary sewer decree runs to July 1, 2027. The program is paid for with water and sewer rates and a one-cent Municipal Option Sales Tax that city voters approved in 2004 and renewed five times through 2024. In national surveys from 2008 to 2019, Atlanta's combined water and sewer charges ranked at or near the highest among large U.S. cities. Greg Eyerly has been commissioner since April 1, 2025.

== History ==
=== Waterworks, 1866 to 1900 ===
Councilman Anthony Murphy began the effort to build a public water system in 1866. The Atlanta Canal and Water Works Company followed, and in 1869 it was charged with bringing water into the city from Peachtree Creek or another stream. A joint committee recommended against a privately owned system. The water commissioners hired the hydraulic engineer Alonzo R. Ketcham to report on a design, and the council agreed to issue $300,000 in bonds, with the commissioners managing the construction contracts. Bids were advertised in early 1874.

The site chosen was Poole's Creek, a headwater of the South River, at what is now Lakewood Park. The works began pumping on September 11, 1875. A 350-foot dam formed the reservoir, and 120 workers laid the main to the city. The department gives the South River plant's capacity as 3 million gallons per day.

The South River supply soon fell short. Mayor William A. Hemphill, who took office in 1891, pressed for a new system drawing on the Chattahoochee. The city authorized $500,000 in waterworks bonds, and construction of the Hemphill Avenue station began in 1892. City Engineer Robert M. Clayton and Water Works Superintendent William G. Richards planned the system. It included settling basins, filters and a pure-water pumping station, connected to the reservoir by a 30-inch main. In 1893 the council's committee on waterworks reported that the water supplied to the city had been pumped from the Chattahoochee since September. The South River site was abandoned. The Hemphill Avenue pumping station was listed on the National Register of Historic Places in 1978.

=== Sewers and treatment, 1900 to 1994 ===
Atlanta's sewer system dates to the 19th century and includes both combined sewers and separate sanitary sewers. By 1915 the city had three sewage treatment plants in operation, on Intrenchment Creek, Peachtree Creek and Proctor Creek. The Intrenchment Creek plant was built in 1910 and upgraded in 1936. Atlanta's early plants used Imhoff tanks, and a 1923 Iowa State College bulletin on their operation illustrated the type with a photograph of the tanks at Atlanta. The three reclamation centers still in use were built in the 1930s: R. M. Clayton in 1935, and Utoy Creek and South River in 1936.

The Chattahoochee Water Treatment Plant opened in 1962. In the mid-1980s the city built three combined sewer overflow treatment facilities in east Atlanta: McDaniel Street, Custer Avenue and Intrenchment Creek. Four more served the west side: Greensferry, North Avenue, Tanyard Creek and Clear Creek. In 1986 the city and Fulton County formed a joint venture to build a water treatment plant in north Fulton. The Fulton County Board of Commissioners established the Atlanta-Fulton County Water Resources Commission at a special meeting on May 28, 1986, to plan, permit, build and operate it. The plant opened in November 1990. In 1993 the city adopted a 10-year capital improvement program that, by the department's account, spent more than $1 billion on wastewater and sewer improvements.

=== Litigation and the consent decrees ===
On June 24, 1994, The Atlanta Journal and Constitution published "Troubled Waters: The Strangling of the Chattahoochee." It reported that storms washed raw sewage into city parks, including Piedmont Park, and that the few fish found in Utoy Creek had lesions or ulcers. On October 10, 1995, the Upper Chattahoochee Riverkeeper Fund, the Chattahoochee Riverkeeper and W. Robert Hancock Jr. sued the city in the United States District Court for the Northern District of Georgia. They alleged violations of the city's National Pollutant Discharge Elimination System (NPDES) permits at its combined sewer overflow facilities. Fulton County moved to intervene on February 2, 1996, and was admitted to the remedial phase on May 16, 1996. On November 17, 1997, the court granted summary judgment to the citizen plaintiffs on liability for the North Avenue, Greensferry and Tanyard Creek facilities. The United States and Georgia filed their own suit in 1998.

The court entered the combined sewer overflow consent decree on September 24, 1998. The EPA reported that it required a $2.5 million civil penalty, which the Justice Department called "the largest Clean Water Act penalty ever assessed against a municipality." It also required a $27.5 million supplemental environmental project to create a greenway corridor and carry out a one-time stream cleanup. The decree set a goal of no more than four overflows a year. According to the EPA Office of Inspector General, the city's 2002 CSO remedial measures plan reported that its facilities had overflowed 50 to 70 times a year.

On July 29, 1999, the federal and state governments filed a second settlement, the First Amended Consent Decree. It covered the treatment plants and the sanitary collection system for violations between 1993 and 1998 and imposed a further $700,000 penalty, bringing the combined total to $3.2 million. It also barred new sewer connections in areas without capacity unless the city added capacity or reduced flow elsewhere.

=== Privatization, 1999 to 2003 ===
In 1998 Mayor Bill Campbell's administration signed a 20-year, $428 million contract with United Water, a subsidiary of the French conglomerate Suez, to run the city's drinking water system. It was then the largest water privatization contract in the United States. United Water took over in 1999.

A city audit questioned United Water's performance in 2002. In mid-August Franklin announced that "United Water has not lived up to its responsibility" and gave the company 90 days to fix the problems or have its contract terminated. According to Mother Jones, her review committee found that collection rates on water bills had dropped from 98 to 94 percent. The magazine reported that, according to the city, the company had cut its operating costs mainly by reducing the waterworks staff by 25 percent. Public Citizen, which opposed the contract, put the cut at more than half the workforce. Both reported that the company sought an additional $80 million. The city ended the contract on January 24, 2003. The resulting legal dispute ended with the city paying the company $6 million and the company paying the city $1 million, according to Atlanta Business Chronicle reports cited by Rough Draft Atlanta. The city formed a Bureau of Water within the new department to run the system. It was budgeted at about $41.1 million with 346 employees, 43 percent fewer than in 1998.

=== Creation of the department and Clean Water Atlanta ===
Franklin created the Department of Watershed Management in September 2002 to bring drinking water, wastewater and stormwater under one department. Its first commissioner, Jack Ravan, had been the EPA's top water official. The rebuilding program that followed became known as Clean Water Atlanta, and the department puts its cost at $4 billion.

For the combined sewer area the city weighed three options. Separating 80 percent of the combined sewers would have cost $1.25 billion, and storage and treatment alone $700 million. The plan it adopted combined 27 percent separation with storage and treatment, at $950 million. The city rejected full separation as the most expensive and disruptive option, one that could not meet the decree deadline. Under the plan the city separated the Greensferry and McDaniel combined sewers and decommissioned those facilities. It built the West Area tunnel and expanded the Intrenchment Creek tunnel by adding the Custer Avenue storage facility. The 2003 amendment to the 1999 decree allowed the city to change some of its sewer projects. In 2004 the court terminated the part of the decree covering the treatment plants after the city completed that work.

The combined sewer construction was finished in 2008. The EPA put its cost at $760 million. According to the department, the program separated 11 miles (18 km) of combined sewers downtown, evaluated 1,574 miles (2,533 km) of sewer mains citywide, repaired and rehabilitated 373 miles (600 km) of sewers and added 55 miles (89 km) of capacity relief. From 2009 through 2017 the city recorded ten combined sewer overflow events, with no more than four in any year.

=== Sanitary sewer deadline extension ===
On May 31, 2012, the EPA and the Georgia EPD proposed amending the 1999 decree to extend the city's final deadline from July 1, 2014, to July 1, 2027. By then the city had cut sanitary sewer overflows by an estimated 97 percent since 2004 at a cost of $1.5 billion. The city expected to spend another $445 million on the remaining decree work. In granting the extension, the court cited the costs of the remaining work, which would be paid for by a 252 percent increase in water and sewer rates and the one-cent sales tax.

=== Drought and the tri-state dispute ===
The department reports that total water use in metro Atlanta fell by about 15 percent from 2006 to 2009 while population grew by 6 percent. In July 2009 U.S. District Judge Paul A. Magnuson ruled that water supply was not an authorized purpose of Lake Lanier. The ruling would have cut metro Atlanta off from the lake after a three-year period for the states to negotiate. On June 28, 2011, the Eleventh Circuit reversed, finding water supply to be an authorized purpose of the reservoir. Georgia and the Army Corps of Engineers finalized a $70 million perpetual contract in January 2021 for 254,170 acre-feet of storage in the lake and up to 222 million gallons a day. On April 1, 2021, in Florida v. Georgia, the Supreme Court unanimously dismissed Florida's suit seeking to cap Georgia's water use.

=== Water supply program ===
Before the 2010s the city's raw water storage, in two reservoirs at the Hemphill plant, held enough water for three to five days. The city bought the Bellwood Quarry in west Atlanta from Vulcan Materials in 2006 for $40 million, according to The Atlanta Journal-Constitution. At the start of tunneling in 2016, Mayor Kasim Reed put the program's cost at $300 million. A tunnel-boring machine named Driller Mike finished a 5-mile (8.0 km) tunnel from the quarry to the Hemphill plant. The tunnel was to be lined with concrete. The program raised raw water storage from about 525 million gallons to 2.4 billion gallons. (Note: Construction Equipment Guide gives about 525 million gallons for storage before the program; another figure, 345 million gallons, has also been reported. The department describes the earlier reserve only as three to five days.) The department reports that construction was completed in December 2020 at a cost of $320 million, and that on December 19, 2022, the facility was renamed the Shirley Clarke Franklin Pumping Station and Reservoir. It puts the reserve at 30 to 60 days. The park built around the reservoir, Westside Park, was renamed Shirley Clarke Franklin Park in March 2025. The reservoir itself is closed to the public.

=== Stormwater and green infrastructure ===
In 1999 the city created a stormwater utility funded by annual charges on property owners. A court held that the charge was a tax rather than a fee, and the utility was invalidated. The city has since funded stormwater work through other sources. In its capital program the department said that up to 10 percent of sales tax revenue, "approximately $12.5 million," would fund stormwater projects each year.

Historic Fourth Ward Park, completed in 2011, was built around a stormwater detention pond in the Clear Creek combined sewer basin. The department's account, published by the US Water Alliance, describes a 9-million-gallon pond that captures runoff from an 800-acre drainage area and relieves the Highland combined sewer trunk. The city had first planned an underground relief tunnel estimated at $40 million. According to the US Water Alliance, the pond was built for about $26 million, a saving of about $14 million. (Note: Other published accounts give the park's cost as $23 million and the savings as $15 million or "more than $5 million"; storage figures of 4 million and 7 million gallons have also been published.)

In February 2013 the city adopted a post-development stormwater management ordinance, Chapter 74, Article X of the city code. It requires new development and redevelopment to manage the first inch of rainfall on site using green infrastructure. Section 74-513 requires the runoff from the first inch of rainfall to be retained on site. The Metropolitan North Georgia Water Planning District gave the ordinance a STREAM Award. In the ordinance's first six years the city permitted more than 4,800 construction projects that used green infrastructure. The EPA credits them with keeping 950 million gallons of runoff a year out of the city's storm and combined sewers. The city's 2018 Green Infrastructure Strategic Action Plan set a goal of a further 225 million gallons a year.

The department's flood-control plan for the Custer Avenue sub-basin in Peoplestown became the subject of a long eminent domain dispute. The city acquired most of the 27 lots on one block for a stormwater pond and park. After protests, Reed agreed that Mattie Jackson, a longtime community leader then 93 years old, could remain in her home. Other owners, including Tanya Washington, a Georgia State University law professor, and Bertha and Robert Darden, contested the condemnation suits. Residents proposed alternatives such as storage under a former Turner Field parking lot. In September 2019 council members Michael Julian Bond and Andre Dickens introduced an ordinance directing the Law Department to withdraw the suits. Jackson died in August 2020. In June 2021 the department posted a sign for the "Peoplestown Storage Vault and Park Project" on the block. Capital B Atlanta reported that the owners of the four remaining homes had spent an estimated $1 million in legal, engineering and other costs over the dispute.

=== Leadership and the Macrina case ===
Rob Hunter, who had been deputy commissioner for engineering, became commissioner in July 2004. He resigned effective September 10, 2010, after what The Atlanta Journal-Constitution described as discussions with the executive branch over his job performance. Reed named Jo Ann Macrina commissioner on April 6, 2011, and the council confirmed her on December 5, 2011. Her tenure ended in May 2016. A federal jury convicted her in October 2022 of conspiracy and federal program bribery for steering city contracts to a firm whose executive gave her money, gifts and a job. U.S. District Judge Steve C. Jones sentenced her to four years and six months in prison and $40,000 in restitution. Kishia Powell, appointed by Reed in 2016, left in April 2020 to become chief operating officer of DC Water.

=== Cyberattack and pandemic, 2018 to 2020 ===
The ransomware attack on the city government that began on March 22, 2018, took down the department's billing systems. On April 6, 2018, the department mailed its first water and sewer bills since the attack, and customers could pay only by mail, in person or through third parties. Online payment of water bills was restored on May 8, 2018.

On March 11, 2020, Mayor Keisha Lance Bottoms issued an administrative order directing the commissioner not to terminate any customer's water service for nonpayment for 60 days. "Access to water is paramount in the prevention of COVID-19," she said. Administrative Order 2020-12 extended the halt through June 30, 2020, and a later order extended it through December 31, 2020.

=== 2024 water main failures ===
On May 31, 2024, a break in 48-inch and 36-inch transmission mains at Joseph E. Boone Boulevard and James P. Brawley Drive cut service and pressure across downtown. The department issued a boil-water advisory. The department gave the cause as age-related decay and corrosion. A second break followed that night at 11th Street and West Peachtree Street in Midtown. The shut-off valve sat directly under the break, and crews could neither see nor use it. On June 6 the city lifted the advisory for most of Atlanta, though parts of Midtown, Old Fourth Ward, Inman Park and Downtown remained under it. Dickens, now mayor, announced a $5 million fund for affected businesses. The Army Corps of Engineers took on a $1 million study of the city's water lines. Dickens also appointed an advisory panel that included Franklin, Metro Atlanta Chamber president Katie Kirkpatrick and retired major general Ron Johnson, to carry out recommendations from the Army Corps and the Federal Emergency Management Agency.

A later investigation by The Atlanta Journal-Constitution found that the city's testing program for critical shut-off valves had fallen behind, and city officials acknowledged that they had not done enough to make sure the valves would work. In mid-June 2024 the council released $177 million from the department's bond reserve fund for other needs. The city's chief financial officer said the department's annual debt service averaged $106 million, and the reserve had held $230 million.

Al Wiggins Jr., the public works commissioner, had taken over the department on May 2, 2024, replacing Mikita Browning. In October 2024 the department told the council's Utilities Committee that it was still assessing the condition of the water system's valves, a job The Atlanta Journal-Constitution put at "some 66,000 valves to check." It said failed shut-off valves had widened the outages.

=== 2025 and 2026 ===
Dickens appointed Greg Eyerly, director of Houston Water, as commissioner. Eyerly started on April 1, 2025, and the council confirmed him on May 19, 2025. Ahead of the 2026 FIFA World Cup matches at Mercedes-Benz Stadium, the department replaced valves and repaired pipes near the stadium and downtown and invested in the Hemphill plant. Eyerly said the system had "breaks almost every single day, if not several a day."

In late April 2026 the department told the council that it was in the final stages of the sanitary sewer decree, ahead of the July 1, 2027, deadline, and that overflow volumes had fallen 99 percent over 25 years. It put the cost of the remaining projects at $1.6 billion and proposed to federal regulators that the system had reached substantial completion. It asked for relief from $600 to $700 million of that work. It also identified $148 million in "no regrets" water projects that it said could cut main breaks by up to half over a decade. In 2026 the city offered $1.1 billion of water and sewer revenue bonds; according to The Bond Buyer, the department had $2.43 billion of debt outstanding at the end of April 2026. On August 3, 2026, the council approved $36,073,840 in contracts, contingent on the FY2027 budget, including a $15.57 million overhaul of the Flint River pump station near the airport. Later that month the department told the City Utilities Committee that it was drafting legislation for a new stormwater utility fee. According to the Center for Civic Innovation, it cited about $200 million a year in unmet stormwater needs and reported that no rate study had been done in about 14 years. It said a charge of 4 cents per square foot of impervious surface would raise about $36 million a year.

== Authority and governance ==
=== City law ===
The department is established in Chapter 2 of the Atlanta Code of Ordinances at Section 2-280. Section 154-1 of the utilities chapter sets the commissioner's duties. These include planning and oversight of water purification and distribution, wastewater service, sewer operations and stormwater management, and ensuring compliance with federal and state water regulations. Section 154-7 assigns the commissioner's office functions that include emergency management and "consent decree and consent order compliance and management." The commissioner runs the department "subject to the direction and supervision of the mayor."

The mayor appoints the commissioner, and the Atlanta City Council confirms the appointment. The council's City Utilities Committee has jurisdiction over the department. The council sets rates by ordinance. The current schedule, Ordinance 24-O-1303, holds rates unchanged from July 1, 2024, through June 30, 2028. The city's charter bars the use of water and sewer funds for stormwater treatment, according to the department.

The department administers the post-development stormwater ordinance in Chapter 74, Article X. Applicants whose projects meet the ordinance's thresholds must hold a consultation meeting with the department on stormwater measures before design.

=== State and federal law ===
The EPA has authorized Georgia to issue NPDES permits, and the Georgia EPD issues the city's discharge permits. The consent decrees enforce the Clean Water Act and the Georgia Water Quality Control Act. The 1998 decree listed separate permits for the reclamation centers: GA0021482 (R. M. Clayton), GA0021458 (Utoy Creek) and GA0024040 (South River). By 2019 the three centers were covered by one permit, GA0039012, for up to 188 million gallons a day. The permit also carries the local limits of the city's industrial pretreatment program. The Water Protection Division of EPA Region 4 oversees the decrees. The city files quarterly reports with EPA and the EPD, and Region 4 holds quarterly meetings with the city, the EPD and the Riverkeeper. The department's water capital program is designed to keep the system in compliance with the Safe Drinking Water Act.

The sales tax is levied under Article 4, Chapter 8, Title 48 of the Official Code of Georgia Annotated. After the 2016 renewal, the city had exhausted the extensions state law allowed. The Georgia General Assembly then voted to let the city seek another.

Consent decree milestones
Date	Event
October 10, 1995	Citizen suit filed (N.D. Ga. No. 1:95-CV-2550)
November 17, 1997	Summary judgment on liability for three CSO facilities
September 24, 1998	CSO consent decree entered; $2.5 million penalty; $27.5 million greenway project
July 29, 1999	First Amended Consent Decree filed; $700,000 penalty
2003	Amendment allowing changes to sewer projects
2004	Treatment plant portion terminated
2008	CSO construction completed
May 31, 2012	Amendment proposed extending the sanitary sewer deadline from July 1, 2014, to July 1, 2027
July 1, 2027	Sanitary sewer deadline

== Service area ==
The water system serves about 1.2 million people over 379 square miles (980 km^{2}). The department's treatment plants supply the city of Atlanta, Sandy Springs, Chattahoochee Hills and South Fulton. Most of Sandy Springs is served by the city with water from the Atlanta-Fulton County plant; Fulton County uses the plant's water north of the Chattahoochee. The R. M. Clayton center treats wastewater from areas north of Interstate 20, parts of Fulton County near Sandy Springs and most of north DeKalb County. South River treats flow from Atlanta, East Point, College Park, Hapeville, Forest Park, DeKalb County and Clayton County. Utoy Creek serves southwest and northwest Atlanta, East Point and part of Fulton County. A 48-inch trunk sewer on a viaduct over Parker Creek in DeKalb County, about 100 years old, carries flow from southeast Atlanta and part of DeKalb County to the Intrenchment Creek plant.

In 2019 the department reported more than 157,000 water account holders and more than 1,400 employees. Crews responded to more than 470 main breaks in 2018. The department says it may have up to 30 main breaks and other emergency repairs a month. The system has 2,790 miles (4,490 km) of water distribution pipe ranging from 2 to 72 inches, 12 storage tanks holding 37 million gallons, and 2,150 miles (3,460 km) of sewers. The department describes the combined sewer area as 19 square miles (49 km^{2}), about 15 percent of the wastewater system area. A 2014 city audit described it as an 11-square-mile (28 km^{2}) area. (Note: The department's 2019 system overview gives 19 square miles; the City Auditor's 2014 report gives 11 square miles. The sources do not explain the difference.)

== Facilities ==
Principal facilities
Facility	Type	Opened	Capacity	Receiving water or source	Permit
Hemphill	Water treatment plant	1893	136.5×10^{6} US gal/d (517,000 m^{3}/d)	Chattahoochee River	
Chattahoochee	Water treatment plant	1962	64.9×10^{6} US gal/d (246,000 m^{3}/d)	Chattahoochee River	
Atlanta-Fulton County (Tom Lowe)	Water treatment plant, jointly owned with Fulton County	1990	90×10^{6} US gal/d (340,000 m^{3}/d)	Chattahoochee River; two reservoirs holding 895 million gallons	
R. M. Clayton	Water reclamation center	1935	100×10^{6} US gal/d (380,000 m^{3}/d) permitted	Chattahoochee River	GA0039012
South River	Water reclamation center	1936	48×10^{6} US gal/d (180,000 m^{3}/d) permitted (Note: The department's capital program page describes South River as designed to treat 54 million gallons a day.)	Chattahoochee River	GA0039012
Utoy Creek	Water reclamation center	1936	40×10^{6} US gal/d (150,000 m^{3}/d) permitted	Chattahoochee River	GA0039012
Intrenchment Creek	Water reclamation center (flow transferred to South River)	1910; upgraded 1936		Flow pumped to South River for treatment	
Bellwood Quarry (Shirley Clarke Franklin Reservoir)	Raw water reservoir	2020	2.4×10^{9} US gal (9,100,000 m^{3})	Chattahoochee River	

The Atlanta-Fulton County plant is run for its two owners by the seven-member Atlanta-Fulton County Water Resources Commission and operated under contract by Veolia.

The 1998 decree lists the following permits for the combined sewer facilities: North Avenue (GA0037117), Tanyard Creek (GA0037109), McDaniel Street (GA0037133), Custer Avenue (GA0037141), Intrenchment Creek (GA0037168) and Clear Creek (GA0036871). The east area facilities lie in the South River basin, part of the Ocmulgee River system. In 2014 the EPD described the city's East Area CSO permit, GA0037168, as the only NPDES combined sewer overflow permit in that part of the basin. It noted that flow given preliminary treatment there is pumped to the South River center, treated further and discharged to the Chattahoochee. The Intrenchment Creek reclamation center can no longer meet modern effluent limits. Its flow is being sent to South River, in a project budgeted at $56,059,000 and scheduled for completion on October 22, 2024.

Rated treatment capacity of the three plants that supply the department's customers, in millions of gallons per day.

== Finance and rates ==
=== Municipal Option Sales Tax ===
Voters approved the one-cent Municipal Option Sales Tax on July 20, 2004, and it took effect October 1, 2004. The city said in 2012 that the tax provided about 20 percent of the department's annual funding.

MOST referendums
Date	Cap	Yes	Result
July 20, 2004		75%	Approved
February 5, 2008		71%	Approved
March 6, 2012		More than 86% (Note: Figure reported by the City of Atlanta in a news release on bond rating upgrades and by department spokeswoman Lillian Govus to The Atlanta Journal-Constitution; no certified total was located.)	Approved
March 1, 2016	$750 million	74% (Fulton portion); 81% (DeKalb portion)	Approved
June 9, 2020	$750 million	64,056 (71.63%)	Approved
May 21, 2024	$1.1 billion	42,297 (74.74%)	Approved

Chart definition page not found.

Share of votes in favor of the MOST in each referendum with a published citywide figure. 2004 and 2008 shares are rounded as published by the city; 2020 and 2024 are from certified totals reported by Ballotpedia.

The 2024 renewal runs from October 1, 2024, through September 30, 2028.

=== Rates ===
The city raised rates through the 2000s to pay for the overhaul of its water and sewer system. Department figures published by The Atlanta Journal-Constitution in 2010 put the average monthly bill for about 6,000 gallons at $49.60 in 2003. Increases approved by then would bring it to $151.92 in 2012, a rise of 206 percent. The paper reported that Atlantans paid 108 percent more than people in New York and 144 percent more than people in San Antonio.

Average monthly water and sewer bill for about 6,000 gallons, from department figures published in 2010. The 2011 and 2012 values are increases approved at that time.

The department states that water and sewer rates have not risen since 2012. Under the schedule in force from 2016 to 2020, a customer inside the city paid a $6.56 monthly base charge for water and $2.58, $5.34 and $6.16 per hundred cubic feet across three usage tiers. Sewer charges were $9.74, $13.64 and $15.69 per hundred cubic feet over a separate $6.56 base charge.

=== National comparisons ===
National surveys from 2008 to 2019 placed Atlanta at or near the top. In 2011 PolitiFact examined a council member's claim that the city had the highest or second-highest average water bills in the country, and rated it true. A department spokeswoman, Janet Ward, told PolitiFact, "Based on everything I know, we are No. 1."

Atlanta in national rate surveys
Survey	Rates as of	Cities	Measure	Atlanta
New York City Department of Environmental Protection	March 2008	24	Average annual residential charges	Highest, nearly $1,500
Black & Veatch	2009 and 2010	50	Average monthly bill, 7,500 gallons	Highest, $154.30
Black & Veatch	2009 and 2010	50	Average monthly bill, 15,000 gallons	Highest, $327.70
Black & Veatch	2009 and 2010	50	Average monthly bill, 3,750 gallons	Second, behind Seattle
American Water Works Association and Raftelis	2010	30	Wastewater rates	Highest
American Water Works Association and Raftelis	2010	30	Water rates	Fourth
Circle of Blue	April 1, 2015	30	Combined water, sewer and stormwater charges, family of four at 100 gallons per person per day	Highest, $325.52
Black & Veatch	2018 and 2019	50	Typical bill, 7,500 gallons	Third, slightly under $200

Circle of Blue's 2015 survey of 30 major cities was the first to add sewer and stormwater charges to water prices. It found Atlanta's combined charge the highest, at $325.52 a month for a family of four using 100 gallons per person per day. Seattle followed at $309.72, while Memphis was lowest at $55.24. Circle of Blue attributed the high sewer rates in both leading cities to multibillion-dollar treatment investments and noted that both operated under EPA consent decrees. In Black & Veatch's survey for 2018 and 2019, Atlanta's typical bill for 7,500 gallons ranked third, slightly under $200 a month, behind Seattle and San Francisco, according to the Georgia Public Policy Foundation.

Highest and lowest combined monthly charges for water, sewer and stormwater among the 30 cities in Circle of Blue's 2015 survey, for a family of four using 100 gallons per person per day. Rates as of April 1, 2015.

Bluefield Research's index of 50 large cities for 2024 reported that a resident earning the federal minimum wage in Atlanta could need more than 20 hours of work to pay a month's water and sewer bill. The national average was more than 11 hours. In 2024 City Council president Doug Shipman said that "the rates in Atlanta have been higher than in a lot of cities." In 2025 Eyerly told Axios that "Atlanta's rates have been very high for a long time."

=== Budget and debt ===
The department's FY2024 proposed operating budget was $255,982,541, an increase of 7.3 percent, with 1,605 authorized positions. The water and wastewater system is financed largely with revenue bonds repaid from water and sewer charges and the sales tax. The Bond Buyer reported that when Moody's upgraded the bonds by one notch, annual debt service coverage had risen from 1.67 times in 2012 to 1.84 times in 2016, with $2.93 billion of debt outstanding. Outstanding debt stood at $2.43 billion at the end of April 2026. In 2025 the council moved $8 million from watershed reserves in the water and wastewater renewal and extension fund to a green infrastructure project in the Valley of Hawks.

== Regulatory compliance ==
Sanitary sewer overflows continued during the extension period. According to the EPA Office of Inspector General, the city reported 202 dry-weather overflows in 2013, 239 in 2014, 264 in 2015, 262 in 2016 and 266 in 2017. Spills released 1.3 million to 9.5 million gallons of sewage a year. At the end of 2017 the city had completed 72 percent of its sewer construction and spent $1.07 billion of an estimated $1.90 billion. The inspector general reported that from 2001 through 2017 NPDES violations averaged about eight a year, with jumps in 2001, 2006 and 2015. Between 2013 and 2017 there were 29 fecal coliform exceedances, most of them 15 to 30 times the permit limit.

Sanitary sewer overflows reported by the city, by year, 2013 to 2017. Source: EPA Office of Inspector General, Report 18-P-0206, Table 1.

== Commissioners ==
Commissioner	Term	Appointed by	Notes
Jack Ravan	2002 to 2004	Shirley Franklin	Former EPA water official
Rob Hunter	July 2004 to September 2010	Shirley Franklin	Resigned
Dexter White (interim)	2010 to 2011	Kasim Reed	
Jo Ann Macrina	2011 to May 2016	Kasim Reed	Confirmed December 5, 2011
William Johnson (interim)	2016	Kasim Reed	
Kishia Powell	2016 to April 2020	Kasim Reed	
Mikita Browning	2020 to May 2024	Keisha Lance Bottoms	Interim from May 1, 2020; confirmed November 16, 2020
Al Wiggins Jr.	May 2024 to March 2025	Andre Dickens	
Greg Eyerly	April 1, 2025, to present	Andre Dickens	Confirmed May 19, 2025

== See also ==
- Tri-state water dispute
- Water privatization in the United States
- Stormwater fee
