= Cheney Stadium (Atlanta) =

Track and athletic field in Atlanta, Georgia

- Location in Summerhill
- Former names: W. O. Cheney Athletic Stadium
- Address: 701 Connally Street SE
- Location: Summerhill, Atlanta, Georgia, United States
- Coordinates: 33.7350°N 84.3820°W
- Owner: Atlanta Public Schools
- Operator: Atlanta Public Schools; programmed by the Atlanta Track Club under permit (2017–present)
- Capacity: 10,000 (1963)
- Type: Outdoor track and athletic field
- Surface: Synthetic track (Rekortan, 2017)

Construction
- Opened: 1949
- Renovated: 1996, 2017

Tenant
- Atlanta Public Schools

Cheney Stadium, originally the W. O. Cheney Athletic Stadium and also called Cheney Field, is an outdoor track and athletic field in the Summerhill neighborhood of Atlanta, Georgia, owned by Atlanta Public Schools (APS). The Atlanta Board of Education built it in 1948 and 1949 as a football stadium for the city's white high schools, on land that Black residents of Summerhill said the mayor had promised them for a park. Black high schools first played there in 1962, and the Southern Intercollegiate Athletic Conference held its track and field championships there in 1963.

It was the warm-up track for the athletics events of the 1996 Summer Olympics, whose main stadium stood a few blocks to the west. The track deteriorated after the Games. APS and the Atlanta Track Club resurfaced and reopened it in 2017, and the club has run programs there since. In 2026 the club proposed building a roughly $100 million indoor track and field center on the site's open field under a long-term ground lease from APS. The chair of the local neighborhood planning unit backed the proposal, and a residents' group formed to oppose it.

== Site and construction ==
Summerhill was established by African Americans during Reconstruction and is one of Atlanta's oldest neighborhoods. In the early 20th century it lay beside a white residential district whose schools, hospital, and library branch excluded Black residents.

In October 1947, the Board of Education announced plans for a football stadium in Summerhill. The site covered about 12 acres (4.9 ha) bounded by Georgia Avenue and Connally, Little, and Ami streets. It had been a city dump, and neighbors called it "the bottom". Black children had played there informally for about 30 years. Several hundred residents met at Reed Street Baptist Church to object. The Atlanta Daily World reported that the site was the only open space in Summerhill where Black children could play, and that Mayor William B. Hartsfield, Councilman Cecil Hester, and Park Commissioner George Simmons had promised it to Black residents as a playground or small park. According to the paper, Superintendent Ira Jarrell had proposed the stadium, which would cost about half a million dollars and was intended for whites. The board had already begun buying land and had asked the city council to close streets within the site. Residents named a committee to take their objections to the mayor and council, but the committee could not get a meeting with either.

The board went ahead, and in August 1948 it awarded contracts for three building projects totaling $1,306,623, including $261,833 for the W. O. Cheney Athletic Stadium on Georgia Avenue. The stadium was named for W. O. Cheney, the land agent who negotiated the board's purchases of school property. By March 1949, the stadium was nearly complete, and residents hoped the city would at least allow Black children to use it. A 1963 report citing the APS director of athletics said the stadium opened for interscholastic competition in 1949 and seated 10,000.

Cheney was one of two stadiums the board built in the late 1940s. The other, Grady Stadium in Midtown, was built in 1947 to a design by architect Richard Aeck.

== Segregated use and desegregation ==
In September 1948, Marion E. Jackson, the Daily World's sports columnist, wrote that Harper Field, the official stadium of the Black high schools, lacked a scoreboard, a time clock, and a fence. He urged the board either to develop Harper Field or to let Black schools play at the new Cheney Stadium. In 1959, Jackson wrote that Atlanta school authorities had "constructed Grady and Cheney stadiums for whites" and had made no comparable provision for the city's six Black high schools. Harper Field, he added, had by then been torn down and not replaced. White schools continued to use Cheney; in 1962 Brown High School listed it as its home field.

Atlanta's white high schools admitted their first Black students on August 30, 1961. The following fall the city's high school football schedule listed the first game between Black schools at Cheney: Price High School against Central High School of Newnan on Thursday, September 13, 1962. Four Black high school games were played at Cheney that season, including a doubleheader of Milk Bowl charity games on November 16 in which Carver played Price and Howard played Washington.

In May 1963, the Southern Intercollegiate Athletic Conference moved its 27th annual track and field championships from the Atlanta University athletic field to Cheney Stadium. Frank L. Forbes, the athletic director at Morehouse College, announced the move. The Daily World described a quarter-mile track with a 220-yard straightaway, pole vault and high jump pits, a press box, and a public address system.

== 1996 Olympics and decline ==
In 1990, Atlanta won the right to host the 1996 Summer Olympics, and organizers chose the blocks around Atlanta–Fulton County Stadium for the 85,000-seat Centennial Olympic Stadium on the south side of Georgia Avenue. Residents of Summerhill and the surrounding neighborhoods had not been consulted, and some organized to oppose the plan. Cheney, a few blocks east of the new stadium, was the warm-up track for track and field athletes during the Games. Mondo, the Italian company that supplied the Olympic Stadium's track surface, also installed surfaces at Cheney Stadium and several other Atlanta venues.

After the Games the track deteriorated, and the Atlanta Track Club later said the stadium had fallen into disrepair. A 2015 park planning study by the nonprofit Park Pride described the site as a public track and open field that was heavily used and functioned like a neighborhood park.

== 2017 restoration ==
In 2017, the Atlanta Track Club raised money to restore the track in cooperation with APS and the city's Department of Parks and Recreation. Rekortan installed an eight-lane synthetic surface. The track reopened on October 26, 2017, when Gail Devers and Dan O'Brien, both gold medalists at the 1996 Games, ran a ceremonial first lap with APS Superintendent Meria Carstarphen and children from the club's youth running program.

APS owns the stadium and has priority use of it. The club runs its programs there under an APS permit, and the track is open to the public outside school hours.

== Property and infrastructure ==
After 2012 flooding in Peoplestown and Summerhill, the city's Department of Watershed Management listed a combined-sewer storage vault on the Connally trunk sewer among its long-term projects for the headwaters of Intrenchment creek. Park Pride's 2015 study noted that the vault was planned beneath Cheney Field and that APS was considering renovating the stadium in coordination with the vault project.

Cheney was one of dozens of school sites whose title stayed with the City of Atlanta after the school system separated from the city in the 1970s. APS sued for the deeds in 2015. In February 2018, the Atlanta City Council approved Ordinance 18-O-1054, which transferred 31 of the disputed properties to APS by quitclaim deed, and Mayor Keisha Lance Bottoms signed it. The ordinance listed Cheney Field at 701 Connally Street SE among the properties, and the city reserved a permanent easement across the site for water, storm sewer, and sanitary sewer lines.

== 2026 indoor track proposal ==
In July 2026, the Atlanta Track Club and APS announced a proposal for an indoor track and field center on the site, which the club called the Cheney Olympic Legacy Complex. It would be the first indoor facility in Georgia dedicated to track and field. The club said it would raise about $100 million from philanthropy, corporate partners, and tax credits for a 175,000-square-foot (16,300 m^{2}) building with a 200-meter hydraulic track, a health clinic, a STEM center for students, community meeting space, and the club's headquarters. Plans also called for retail space, an overlook of the existing outdoor track, and a surface parking lot; the club cited The Armory in New York City as its model. The outdoor track would remain.

Under the proposal APS would retain ownership of the land and grant the club a long-term ground lease without contributing money. Press reports in July said that the APS board was expected to consider the project in August 2026 and that the club hoped to reach a definitive agreement by the end of September. The club held community meetings through the summer, including one on August 12, 2026, at King Middle School.

The chair of Neighborhood Planning Unit V said the neighborhood had been involved from the start and welcomed the club's commitment to Summerhill's Olympic legacy. The executive director of the Summerhill Neighborhood Development Corporation said residents were excited about an indoor track but concerned about green space. Rich Kenah, the club's chief executive, said residents had raised concerns about parking, traffic, tree preservation, accessibility, and stormwater runoff. A residents' group called Our Cheney organized to oppose the plan. It objected to converting the fields to parking and questioned the terms of what it described as a proposed 50-year lease.

== See also ==
- Eddie S. Henderson Stadium
- Lakewood Stadium
- Centennial Olympic Stadium
