= Ethel Mae Mathews =

American welfare rights activist

Ethel Mae Mathews (also spelled Ethel Mae Matthews; 1932 or 1933 – March 14, 2005) was an American welfare rights and tenants' rights activist and community organizer in Atlanta, Georgia. She founded, and was the first president of, the Atlanta Welfare Rights Organization and was a leading figure in welfare-rights organizing centered on Emmaus House in the Peoplestown neighborhood of Atlanta.

== Life and activism ==
Mathews was born in Loachapoka, Alabama and moved to Atlanta in 1950, where she raised four children. She organized welfare recipients and tenants, including work connected with Tenants United for Fairness (TUFF), and later neighborhood organizing around development and displacement issues associated with the 1996 Olympics. She also ran for the Atlanta City Council.

Mathews was a spokesperson for the plaintiffs in Armour v. Nix, an ACLU-filed school desegregation lawsuit begun in 1972.

== Death ==
Mathews died of heart failure at her home in Atlanta on March 14, 2005, aged 72.
