= Rich Kenah =

American former professional runner

Personal information
- Full name: Richard Kenah
- Born: August 4, 1970 (age 56) Montclair, New Jersey, U.S.
Medal record
Men's athletics (track and field)
Representing the United States
World Championships
| Bronze medal – third place | 1997 Athens | 800 m |

Richard Kenah (born August 4, 1970, in Montclair, New Jersey) is a US former middle-distance runner who won bronze medals over 800 metres at the 1997 World Indoor Championships and at the World Championships in Athens. After placing second in the Olympic 800m Trials, Kenah ran in the 2000 Summer Olympics in Sydney, placing 6th in his 800-meter heat.

== Personal bests ==
| Year | Event | Time |
|---|---|---|
| 1997 | 800 metres | 1:43.38 |
| 1997 | 1500 metres | 3:37.63 |

== Personal life ==
Kenah attended Immaculate Conception High School in Montclair, New Jersey. He graduated from Georgetown University with a degree in International Marketing in 1992. He is now married to fellow runner Cheri Goddard-Kenah and resides in Atlanta, GA. Since 2014, Kenah has served as the executive director at the Atlanta Track Club, the second largest running organization in the country. The organization hosts over 30 events per year, including the world largest 10k, the AJC Peachtree Road Race. Kenah has helped to grow the Atlanta Track Club Elite Team, a professional running group coached by ex-professional runners Andrew and Amy Begley.

Kenah was formerly the marketing director at Global Athletics & Marketing, a boutique sports marketing firm managing top Olympic stars including Tirunesh Dibaba, Meseret Defar and Nick Willis.
