= Intrenchment Creek Park =

County park in DeKalb County, Georgia, United States

- Interactive map of Intrenchment Creek Park
- Type: County park
- Location: Unincorporated DeKalb County, Georgia, United States
- Coordinates: 33.690382°N 84.326219°W
- Area: 136 acres (55 ha) (2003 purchase)
- Created: 2003
- Owner: DeKalb County (original park land other than the 40-acre (16 ha) tract held by Blackhall Real Estate Phase II)
- Operator: DeKalb County Department of Recreation, Parks and Cultural Affairs
- Status: Reopened September 26, 2026

Intrenchment Creek Park is a county park in unincorporated DeKalb County, Georgia, southeast of Atlanta. The county bought about 136 acres at Constitution Road and West Side Place in 2003, partly with a Trust for Public Land grant funded by the Arthur M. Blank Family Foundation. In 2021, the county traded about 40 acres of the park, including its entrance, to Blackhall Real Estate Phase II for 52.9 acres nearby. The county closed the park by executive order in March 2023, during protests against the neighboring Atlanta Public Safety Training Center. A ribbon cutting ceremony was held on September 26, 2026, for a site it called Michelle Obama Park at Intrenchment Creek. The 40 acres traded in 2021 are in private hands.

== Description ==
The park lies along Intrenchment Creek in the South River Forest. It sits at Constitution Road and West Side Place, near Bouldercrest Road. The former Old Atlanta Prison Farm land, where Atlanta built its public safety training center, adjoins it. The park also abuts Constitution Lakes, another county park bought with Blank Foundation money.

The county listed the old trailhead at 3251 West Side Place. The park contains the county's only remote-controlled airplane field, and streams in the park flow into the South River. The Atlanta Radio Control Club, which says it was "established in 1968", has flown model aircraft there on a paved miniature runway "for a half-century", according to SaportaReport. The club lists its field at 1600 Constitution Road SE.

== History ==
=== Purchase ===
The 2003 deed had two parties. The Trust for Public Land was the grantor and DeKalb County was the grantee. It conveyed the land subject to a "covenant and use restriction that it shall be used in perpetuity as park property". The deed gave the Blank Foundation and "any member of the general public who utilizes the Property" the right to enforce that restriction. A 2018 report in The Atlanta Journal-Constitution gave 2004 as the year the park was created. It said county funds and a Blank Foundation grant paid for it.

The park was the western end of the South River Trail, built by the PATH Foundation. Georgia Perimeter College described the completed trail as running from the Atlanta Radio Control Club on Constitution Road to its Decatur campus. In November 2016 the county commission unanimously voted to name a stretch of the South River Trail for Michelle Obama. That stretch runs between Gresham Park and the Georgia State University campus in Panthersville.

=== Land swap ===
Representatives of Blackhall approached the county in 2018 about trading part of the park for nearby Blackhall land. The county parks department concluded that the deal could not proceed unless the Trust for Public Land and the Blank Foundation released the use restriction. Opponents organized under the name "Stop the Swap" while the county negotiated with both groups from late 2018 to early 2020. Blackhall's 2018 proposal covered 55 acres of the park. It called for the company to pay for moving the model airfield, rerouting a paved trail and building two new trailheads.

In February 2020 appraisals by the Valbridge Group valued the county's 40 acres at $2,800,000 and Blackhall's 52.9 acres at $3,200,000. On October 13, 2020, the board of commissioners approved the exchange by a vote of 5 to 1, with one abstention. Kathie Gannon cast the only vote against it. The terms required Blackhall to make $1,500,000 in park improvements and pay the county $100,000.

The exchange closed on January 29, 2021. The Trust for Public Land and the Blank Foundation signed deeds releasing the use restriction that day. The county transferred 2235 Bouldercrest Road to Blackhall. It received three Blackhall parcels, including 2055 Bouldercrest Road. In April 2021 Ryan Millsap sold Blackhall Studios to the Commonwealth Group, which later formed Shadowbox Studios. His company Blackhall Real Estate kept the 40 acres, and the studio expansion was never built. Shadowbox told WABE in 2026 that it "has no connection to Intrenchment Creek Park".

=== Litigation ===
In February 2021 the South River Watershed Alliance and the South River Forest Coalition sued the county and Blackhall in DeKalb County Superior Court. Four residents joined them: Margaret S. Brady, Allen P. Doyle, Joel Finegold and Joseph S. Peery. They asked the court to declare the swap void. They also sought an order keeping the land as a public park until a referendum approved giving it up.

The suit relied on a 2020 amendment to the Constitution of Georgia that waived sovereign immunity for some suits seeking declaratory relief against local governments. The trial court denied the county's motion to dismiss. It granted Blackhall's motion to dismiss one claim. In December 2022 the alliance asked the court to stop demolition on the Blackhall tract, and Judge Stacey Hydrick denied the request on December 28, 2022. The trial court later granted summary judgment to the county and Blackhall.

On October 23, 2024, the Georgia Court of Appeals held that the amendment requires such suits to name only the government. Because this suit also named Blackhall, the court ruled that the whole action was barred. The court said it would "vacate the trial court's summary judgment order and remand this case to the trial court to enter an order dismissing Appellants' complaint as barred by sovereign immunity." The court did not rule on whether the swap itself was lawful. The Supreme Court of Georgia denied review on March 31, 2025.

=== Quiet title action ===
In the spring of 2025 Blackhall filed a quiet title action, and on May 6, 2025, it served the original plaintiffs. Its filing said a buyer had the parcel "under contract" but ended the deal after the plaintiffs' lawyers signaled they would keep fighting. It said the dispute had "rendered Blackhall's title unmarketable." Allie Jett was named special master. Jackie Echols, the alliance's board president, told WABE: "We had sunk a small fortune into this case." Finegold continued the fight on his own.

The alliance reported that Judge Stacey Hydrick issued a mediation order on February 2, 2026, with a deadline of May 30, 2026. Millsap, then running for Congress, wrote to WABE that "Liberal Antifa lawsuits and interference halted development" and had cost him "tens of millions of dollars".

In February 2024 Hickory Real Estate Partners asked the county to confirm that the zoning on Blackhall's parcel did not rule out a data center. The county replied that the zoning was appropriate. WABE said the letter worked "more like a pre-approval" and did not guarantee approval. The 2025 tax assessment valued the 40 acres at just under $4.1 million, according to WABE.

=== County response ===
Commissioner Ted Terry introduced a resolution in May 2025 asking the administration to recover the 40 acres and reopen the park. The commission voted on December 16, 2025, to withdraw it. At that meeting chief operating officer Zach Williams said, "We want to make good on what we had assured the community was going to happen." In May 2026 chief executive Lorraine Cochran-Johnson said, "In February of this year, I authorized our law department to begin necessary discussions to obtain the land".

== Protests and closure ==
In June 2022 Millsap put up barriers and no-trespassing signs on the 40 acres, but people kept entering. Protesters against the training center camped in the park. In December 2022 Blackhall's contractors demolished parts of the West Side Place entrance.

On January 18, 2023, Georgia State Patrol troopers shot and killed the activist Manuel Esteban Paez Terán, known as Tortuguita, during a sweep of the park. WABE reported that a small memorial stands in the brush at the site, where family members spread Paez Terán's ashes. Authorities said Paez Terán fired first and wounded a trooper. In an order reported on April 1, 2026, U.S. District Judge Steven Grimberg dismissed a lawsuit by Paez Terán's parents. He found the troopers' use of deadly force "objectively reasonable".

The organizers said roughly 1,500 people attended a music festival in the park over the weekend of March 5, 2023. The Atlanta Police Department said 35 people were detained that evening after vehicles were burned at the training center site.

On March 24, 2023, chief executive Michael Thurmond issued an executive order closing the park, citing "dangerous and possible life-threatening conditions". The order covered county properties totaling about 140 acres. They were 2055, 2058, 2098, 2109, 2142 and 2156 Bouldercrest Road, with the park itself listed at 2109. The order cited "the installation of hidden traps or other devices designed to injure, maim, or cause the death of adults, children, and pets." On March 27 police cleared the park. The county said officers recovered "a Molotov cocktail, booby trap boards with rusty nails protruding out, and several syringes containing Fentanyl".

== Public access and current status ==
In June 2023 Thurmond announced a $1.8 million plan to reopen the park. The county said the money would pay for a pavilion, a trailhead, a remote-control airplane runway and a walking trail. The funds came from the county's 2023 Tourism Product Development Fund, which draws on hotel and motel taxes. SaportaReport found that the money went to an existing plan for a Michelle Obama Park rather than to the old park. The park stayed closed. In March 2026 WABE found chest-high grass at the old entrance, and the other 80 or so acres of county land had no public access point.

In May 2026 the county announced a "reimagined" park centered on land it received in the swap, which had long been called Michelle Obama Park. Terry said the plan "isn't related to getting the 40 acres back". Construction on the first phase began on May 18, 2026. That phase covers 85.43 acres, and the second covers 23.83 acres. The first phase added 28 parking spaces and 0.6 miles of 8-foot-wide trail, with an entrance off Constitution Road. It also improved the existing model airfield. The second phase is to include a playground, a splash pad, a pavilion and athletic courts. Decaturish listed about $4.1 million in funding for the project, including a $1.5 million donation from Henrico.

On June 1, 2026, the county said it had just received the right to name the second phase Michelle Obama Park. The watershed alliance objected that the county had renamed the whole site, including the original park, without public action. It cited a June 24, 2026, email from parks director Chris Bass describing "the property, now formally and collectively named Michelle Obama Park". SaportaReport had reported that a 2021 commission resolution approved renaming the park.

The county held the ribbon cutting at 1600 Constitution Road SE on September 26, 2026. It described the event as the reopening of Michelle Obama Park at Intrenchment Creek and cited a $1.8 million Phase I investment. The first phase includes a 0.6-mile concrete trail with a boardwalk. Officials said the trail connects to Gresham Park and the South River Trail.

== Trails and park connections ==
When the West Side Place trailhead closed, the county directed trail users to the Michelle Obama Trail at the Gresham Park Recreation Center, 3112 Gresham Road. It said its master plan included a new trailhead along Bouldercrest Road. Supporters of the 2020 swap said the new land would help create one continuous stretch of parkland. SaportaReport described the 2021 Michelle Obama Park plan as combining part of the old park with the new land to the north, leaving out the Blackhall tract. The Atlanta Radio Control Club reported in 2026 that its runway would move west so it is no longer on Millsap's land.

== Environmental and development effects ==
On April 6, 2023, DeKalb County issued a stop-work order at the training center site over failing erosion controls. It lifted the order the next day. In a November 2 letter to county planners, alliance lawyer Jon Schwartz argued that grading would "exceed the remaining annual sediment load allocation for Intrenchment Creek", according to SaportaReport. The Georgia Environmental Protection Division said the limit did not apply.

On August 1, 2023, the alliance sued the City of Atlanta and the Atlanta Police Foundation in the United States District Court for the Northern District of Georgia under the Clean Water Act (No. 1:23-cv-03416). Its amended complaint alleged that sediment from the construction site was degrading Intrenchment Creek. It also said members intended to keep using the park when it reopened. In January 2024 Judge J. P. Boulee denied the alliance's request to halt construction. The parties later settled. On April 1, 2025, Boulee approved an amended settlement agreement requiring remediation work and payment of the alliance's legal fees, and dismissed the case with prejudice. By March 2026 the training center was built and in use.

== See also ==
- Intrenchment Creek
- South River Forest
- Cop City
- Stop Cop City
- Killing of Tortuguita
- Old Atlanta Prison Farm
