= Summerhill, Atlanta =

Summerhill
- Location in central Atlanta
- Coordinates: 33°44′14″N 84°23′10″W
- Country: United States
- State: Georgia
- County: Fulton County
- City: City of Atlanta
- NPU: V

Population (2010)
  - Total: 2,025
- Source: 2010 U.S. census figures as tabulated by WalkScore

Summerhill is a neighborhood directly south of Downtown Atlanta between the Atlanta Zoo and Center Parc Stadium. It is bordered by the neighborhoods of Grant Park, Mechanicsville, and Peoplestown. Established in 1865, Summerhill is one of Atlanta’s oldest neighborhoods and part of the 26 neighborhoods making up the Atlanta Neighborhood Planning Unit system.

== History ==
One of two settlements established after the Civil War by William Jennings in 1865, Summerhill's early inhabitants were freed slaves and Jewish immigrants. In 1911, two-thirds of Atlanta's Jewish residents lived in Summerhill. Wood's Chapel and Clarke's Chapel began offering worship services in 1866 within close proximity of each other. Wood's Chapel subsequently became Allen Temple AME. Clarke's Chapel's congregation was mixed and sought to also promote education which it accomplished by holding the first classes of Clark College and Gammon Theological Seminary in its basement. Clarke's Chapel was ultimately renamed the Lloyd Street Church.

In 1867 Frederick Ayer founded his school at Richardson and Martin Streets. The Atlanta Board of Education bought it three years later, making it the only public school for Black children in the City. The school was eventually renamed the E. P. Johnson Elementary School. By 1965, Summerhill grew westward after absorbing the former neighborhood of Washington–Rawson due to its homes being razed to make room for Atlanta–Fulton County Stadium and its parking lots.

In 1966 there was a four-day riot in Summerhill which the Student Nonviolent Coordinating Committee (SNCC) and its leader Stokely Carmichael were accused of inciting following an incident of police brutality. The riots resulted in one death and twenty injuries, and revealed the frustrations still present in lower-income black communities despite two decades of growing black political influence. Mayor Ivan Allen, Jr. went to the area during the riot, pleaded with rioters, and worked with police and local black leaders to restore order in the area.

During the 1996 Summer Olympic Games, Summerhill was the site of the opening and closing ceremonies and track and field events at the Centennial Olympic Stadium. After the Olympics, the stadium was converted to Turner Field where the Atlanta Braves played through the end of the 2016 season. Turner Field and its adjacent parking lots were acquired by Georgia State University in January 2017, and the former ballpark was renovated into Georgia State Stadium, since renamed Center Parc Stadium, for the Panthers football team. The Georgia State Convocation Center is also based in Summerhill which is home to the Georgia State men's and women's basketball teams. The first Atlanta Braves stadium, Atlanta–Fulton County Stadium located next door, was their home when the team first moved to Atlanta in 1966 until its demolition after the 1997 season.

After decades of decline, since 1996, the neighborhood has been the site of rapid revitalization and development. It is profiled as a case in urban development in Alexander von Hoffman's House by House, Block by Block: The Rebirth of America's Urban Neighborhoods. Since 2017, Georgia State is redeveloping Turner Field's parking lots into new mixed developments.

== Notable people ==
- Leo Frank lived there
- Boxer Evander Holyfield grew up in Summerhill
- Young Dro
- Ciara
- YFN Lucci

== Intrenchment Creek and stormwater ==
=== Headwaters ===
Summerhill sits over the headwaters of Intrenchment creek, the largest urban tributary of the South River. The upper creek is buried beneath the Downtown Connector and Interstate 20 interchange and the parking lots that surrounded Turner Field, and it runs through the neighborhood inside the city's combined sewer system. Just south of downtown, three combined sewers carrying stormwater and sanitary sewage merge in this basin. The Department of Watershed Management calls the area the Custer Avenue sub-basin of the Intrenchment Creek basin. A 2020 plan by the Intrenchment Creek One Water Management Task Force estimated that about 2,600 acres of southeast Atlanta drain to the upper creek.

=== Stadium runoff and city projects ===
Marni Davis, Richard Milligan and Andy Walter, in a 2022 chapter on stadiums and environmental justice, document flooding in Summerhill and Peoplestown before the first stadium was built and write that "sport stadiums upstream exacerbate routine flooding". Capital B Atlanta reported in 2026 that longtime residents recalled the city rerouting major sewer lines for the Olympic stadium before the 1996 Summer Olympics, with promises to prevent flooding in the surrounding Black neighborhoods. After the July 2012 floods in Peoplestown, a Department of Watershed Management official said the combined sewer "wasn't designed to handle the upstream areas being completely impervious" and that downtown and the stadium drain to that point.

In November 2013 the city began a $19.5 million project to build a five-million-gallon stormwater tank beneath the Turner Field media parking lot, days before the Atlanta Braves announced they would leave the stadium. The council member for the district said runoff from the Downtown Connector and the stadium lots ended up in residents' homes downhill. The tank was in place by mid-2014 as part of the $65 million Southeast Atlanta Green Infrastructure Initiative, which also rebuilt about six miles of streets in Summerhill, Mechanicsville and Peoplestown with permeable pavers. The department later said it had rejected an option for a retention pond in the Turner Field parking lot because the lot sits at the top of the hill. In 2020 the Georgia Department of Transportation completed its first green infrastructure retrofit, two rain gardens beside the Capitol Avenue bridge over the interchange, which American Rivers said would infiltrate about 750,000 gallons of highway runoff a year. The pilot was funded with $400,000 from the department and a $197,745 grant from the Georgia Environmental Protection Division.

=== Redevelopment and stormwater standards ===
Georgia State University and a joint venture led by the developer Carter closed on the 68-acre stadium site in January 2017, with the university taking the stadium and 38 acres and the developers buying 16 acres and leasing 13.5 more. A community survey conducted during the Stadium Neighborhoods Livable Centers Initiative found that managing stormwater was residents' first request for the new development, according to American Rivers, which served on the plan's core team. American Rivers recommended that development on the site retain the first 1.8 inches of rainfall, beyond the city's one-inch requirement, and said the standard was endorsed by the initiative and the city. The group also wrote to Georgia State and Carter asking them to adopt the plan's stormwater and wastewater recommendations.

In December 2017 Carter, ECO-Action, the watershed department and American Rivers convened the Intrenchment Creek One Water Management Task Force. Its 2020 plan proposed capturing and infiltrating runoff in the upper watershed and requiring upstream property owners to hold stormwater on site. The plan did not move forward, and the task force was succeeded by the Intrenchment Creek Community Stewardship Council. In January 2026 Jacqueline Echols of the South River Watershed Alliance said the city "didn't force Georgia State or the Atlanta Public School system" to keep their stormwater on their sites.

=== Downstream response ===
The city's largest response has been in Peoplestown, downhill of Summerhill, where it acquired a block of houses for a stormwater park and is building the $156.5 million Custer Avenue Capacity Relief Multi-Benefit Project with a 20-million-gallon vault. The department has said the vault addresses the root cause of flooding by adding storage. As of July 2026, completion was scheduled for December 2027.

=== Cheney Stadium proposal ===
As of August 2026, Atlanta Public Schools was considering a long-term lease of 16.5 acres beside W. O. Cheney Stadium, the 1996 Olympic warm-up track site, to the Atlanta Track Club for a proposed 175,000-square-foot indoor track facility. Residents at an August 2026 community meeting raised traffic, parking, stormwater runoff and access to the outdoor track as unanswered questions. The club's chief executive, Rich Kenah, told Creative Loafing that when the letter of intent was signed the district was told the watershed department "does not have any plans or need to use the Cheney property" for stormwater mitigation.
