= Atlanta Track Club =

Running association in Georgia, USA

- Formation: 1964; 62 years ago
- Headquarters: 201 Armour Drive NE Atlanta, GA 30324
- Members: 40,000 (2026)
- Executive Director: Rich Kenah
- Coach: Tom Nohilly
- Website: www.atlantatrackclub.org

Atlanta Track Club is a non-profit, running organization for the Atlanta metropolitan area in Georgia, United States. It supports youth and adult running at all levels and hosts an elite team. The club created the AJC Peachtree Road Race. The club also manages the Atlanta Marathon.

== Atlanta Track Club Elite ==
Atlanta Track Club Elite (ATC) was founded in 2015. The group mainly focuses on the middle distance events of the 800m and 1500m. The group has a partnership with Adidas.

Amy Yoder Begley was named the ATC coach in 2014. The club announced they were separating with Begley and her husband in 2023. Athetes Gemma Finch, Emma Grace-Hurley, and Allie Wilson left the club to follow Begley. Tom Nohilly was hired as the head coach.

ATC member Luke Houser won bronze in the men’s 1500 m at the 2025 World Athletics Indoor Championships.

Current Members

Listed from the Atlanta Track Club Elite Team Page.

- Aidan Ryan
- Camille Laus
- Gabrielle Wilkinson
- Hannah Segrave
- Justin O’Toole
- Laurie Ferier
- Luciano Fiore
- Luke Houser
- Olivia Baker
- Rachel Gearing
- Rynard Swanepoel
- Sean Dolan

Former Members

- Ellie Abrahamson
- Abraham Alvarado
- Dylan Capwell
- Rob Heppenstall
- Eden Meyer
- Yolanda Ngarambe
- Keturah Orji
- Allie Wilson
- Emma Grace Hurley
- Gemma Finch

== Finances ==
Atlanta Track Club is a 501(c)(3) nonprofit. For the fiscal year ending December 31, 2024, it reported revenue of $14.2 million, expenses of $13.4 million and net assets of $3.7 million on its Form 990; contributions accounted for $6.2 million (43.5%) of revenue and program service revenue for $7.7 million (54.5%). Reported revenue rose from $5.0 million in 2011 to $14.2 million in 2024, and the share from contributions rose from 18.2% to 43.5% over the same period. Expenses exceeded revenue in 2013, 2020, 2022 and 2023.

=== Atlanta Track Club Foundation ===
The Atlanta Track Club Foundation, established in May 2021, is a separately incorporated supporting organization that oversees the club's fundraising and makes grants to other nonprofits. The club announced the foundation's relaunch in October 2021, naming Kendyl Moss as its president and Katie Kirkpatrick, president and CEO of the Metro Atlanta Chamber, as board chair, and committing it to award $100,000 in charitable donations beginning in 2022. The foundation files its own Form 990; for 2024 it reported revenue of $366,958, expenses of $598,865, total assets of $130,640 and total liabilities of $842,047. Its 2024 filing reported executive compensation of $239,650, 40% of expenses.

== Controversies ==
=== 2026 USATF Half Marathon Championships course error ===
At the USATF Half Marathon Championships on March 1, 2026, held during the club's Publix Atlanta Marathon weekend, a lead vehicle and a police motorcycle led the four leading women off the course about a mile from the finish. Jess McClain, who had built a clear lead, ran in the wrong direction for more than a minute before turning back. McClain, Emma Grace Hurley and Ednah Kurgat finished 9th, 12th and 13th in the official results, and Molly Born was declared the champion. The club's published review said that shortly after 8 a.m. a vehicle struck a police officer working the race, and that officers posted at the turn left to help before cones had been repositioned to prevent a wrong turn. The affected athletes filed a protest and an appeal. USATF agreed that the course had not been properly marked but said its rulebook provided no way to change the order of finish. The club said it was responsible for the integrity of the championships and announced that it would pay McClain the $20,000 first-place prize, with Hurley and Kurgat splitting the combined second- and third-place prize money. On March 25, 2026, World Athletics granted USATF a one-time exception to enter seven women, rather than four, in the half marathon at the World Athletics Road Running Championships in Copenhagen. Places were offered to the three misdirected athletes and the three official top finishers, and McClain, Hurley and Kurgat were named to the team.

=== Proposed indoor facility at Cheney Stadium ===
In July 2026 the club and Atlanta Public Schools presented a proposal for an indoor track and field facility, called the Cheney Olympic Legacy Complex, on about 16.5 acres of school district land beside Cheney Stadium in Summerhill. The site was the warm-up track for the 1996 Summer Olympics, and the club has programmed the outdoor track there since its 2017 renovation. The proposed 175,000-square-foot building would cost roughly $100 million and would include a 200-meter hydraulic competition oval, the club's headquarters, a STEM center for students, a health clinic and community space. The club said it would fund the project through philanthropy, tax credits and corporate partnerships, with no funding from the school district or the city, and that it aimed to begin construction within 18 months and finish by the end of 2029. The proposal requires approval from Atlanta Public Schools.

Creative Loafing reported that talks with the district began in March 2026 and that a non-binding letter of intent was signed in mid-June, before the plan was made public at a neighborhood meeting on July 6. Under the letter's terms as described by the paper, the club would pay no rent during a three-year construction period, then $50,000 a year rising in steps to a maximum of $150,000 a year, with rent reduced in years the club reported a loss. At a community meeting on August 12, 2026, residents criticized the engagement process and the lack of answers on traffic, parking, stormwater runoff and access to the outdoor track, and a group of residents organized to oppose the project. Creative Loafing reported that the club's chief executive, Rich Kenah, apologized to residents who felt blindsided by the rollout and said a 300-space parking deck shown in the initial rendering was not needed. A 60-day traffic study had been commissioned but had not begun as of mid-August. Kenah said the district had been told when the letter of intent was signed that the city's watershed department "does not have any plans or need to use the Cheney property" for formal stormwater mitigation. Katie Howard, the school board member for the area, and Jason Winston, the city council member for the area, each described their position as uncommitted, and the district said discussions remained preliminary. The school board could vote on the proposal as early as October 2026.
