= Mechanicsville, Atlanta =

Mechanicsville
- Neighborhood of Atlanta
- Location of Mechanicsville in Atlanta
- Coordinates: 33.73948°N 84.39888°W
- Country: United States
- State: Georgia
- County: Fulton

Government
  - Type: Neighborhood of Atlanta
- Time zone: UTC-5 (Eastern (EST))
  - Summer (DST): UTC-4 (EDT)
- ZIP codes: 30314

Mechanicsville is a neighborhood of Atlanta, Georgia. It sits just south of downtown Atlanta.

The neighborhood is bounded by:

- I-20 on the north, across which is Castleberry Hill and Downtown Atlanta
- the I-75/I-85 Downtown Connector on the east, across which are Summerhill and Peoplestown
- the Southern Railway lines on the southwest, across which is Pittsburgh

Mechanicsville is in NPU V.

== History ==
Mechanicsville is one of the oldest neighborhoods in Atlanta. The neighborhood sprang up in the late 19th century, adjacent to several railroad lines just south of downtown. The name "Mechanicsville" comes from the "mechanics" that worked on the railway lines. It was once a vibrant multiethnic community with working class blacks and middle class whites, and home to several prominent merchant families, including the Rich family, of department store fame. Mechanicsville was established in 1870. The mural in the background displays this information from an artists work.

The neighborhood went into heavy decline caused by out migration of many middle-class families, rampant crime, and the construction of Atlanta–Fulton County Stadium and the nearby interstate highways.

The rapper diamond* who makes audio with T.V. is from here and many other historical figures.

Since the 2010s, Mechanicsville has undergone major revitalization due to its proximity to Downtown and Midtown. Middle class families and individuals are moving back to the neighborhood, many abandoned and damaged homes have been renovated by investors, new constructed homes are growing in the neighborhood, economic development has improved, property values are steadily increasing, crime is slowly improving, and racial diversity is on the rise again.

== Education ==
Atlanta Public Schools serves Mechanicsville. Neighborhood Charter School serves Mechanicsville.

Atlanta-Fulton Public Library System operates the Mechanicsville Branch.

== Neighborhood associations ==
The neighborhood organization is the Mechanicsville Civic Association and the Citizens Association of Mechanicsville. This CDC, SUMMECH, develops and implements strategies for revitalization of the neighborhood.

== In popular culture ==
In the film ATL, the main characters, Rashad (played by Atlanta native, rapper T.I.) and Ant (played by actor Evan Ross), both lived in Mechanicsville.

Big Gee of Boyz n da Hood was born in Mechanicsville and currently lives there.

== Intrenchment Creek and stormwater ==
Mechanicsville lies in the headwaters of Intrenchment creek, which drains part of southeast Atlanta and flows to the South River. A 2020 plan by the Intrenchment Creek One Water Management Task Force placed those headwaters between the Eastern Continental Divide near downtown and the neighborhoods of Summerhill, Peoplestown, Mechanicsville, Pittsburgh, Grant Park and Castleberry Hill. The plan attributed persistent flooding in the downstream neighborhoods to pavement and to aging underground infrastructure, from the interchange of Interstates 75, 85 and 20 to the parking lots around the former Turner Field. Mechanicsville is among the parts of Atlanta still served by a combined sewer that carries sewage and stormwater in the same pipes. A 2016 report in Next City stated that impervious surfaces cover more than 60 percent of Peoplestown and Mechanicsville.

=== July 2012 storms and green infrastructure ===
In July 2012 a series of storms caused combined sewer overflows in southeast Atlanta and flooded streets and houses. The city's Department of Watershed Management reviewed the combined sewer system and created the Southeast Atlanta Green Infrastructure Initiative, covering Peoplestown, Mechanicsville and Summerhill. Eight short term projects followed, including bioswales. Longer term work listed by the city included underground storage vaults, capacity relief ponds and permeable pavers.

Under the initiative the city rebuilt about six miles of streets in the three neighborhoods with permeable pavers, and put the added capacity at up to 7.1 million gallons. One trade account called the work the largest permeable pavement retrofit in North America. Todd Hill of the Department of Watershed Management said the city picked "residential streets that contributed to the flooding of our combined sewer system." The department has since taken the Custer Avenue Multi-Benefit Capacity Relief Project into design as the next stage of work in the Custer Avenue sub-basin.

=== Response in Mechanicsville ===
Writing in a newsletter produced by residents trained by ECO-Action and American Rivers, the Mechanicsville resident Jason Dozier said frustration over the city's work reached his neighborhood "even though the community isn't directly affected by the flooding." He wrote that the city began installing pavers without notifying residents, and that it did not coordinate the work with schools or transit. He also wrote that some streets were torn up for more than a month.

=== One Water plan ===
American Rivers, ECO-Action, the developer Carter and the Department of Watershed Management convened the Intrenchment Creek One Water Management Task Force in December 2017. The task force published a plan in September 2020 recommending stormwater management across the headwaters basin. The plan listed the Mechanicsville Civic Association among the groups that took part.
