= Global Athletics & Marketing =

- Industry: Sport management
- Founded: 1993; 32 years ago
- Founder: Mark Wetmore
- Headquarters: Boston, Massachusetts, United States
- Website: globalathletics.com

Global Athletics & Marketing is a sports management firm specializing in athletics (track and field). Founded in 1993 by Cornell/Boston College Law School graduate Mark Wetmore, Global Athletics has grown to be one of the premier athletics management agencies in the world.

Based in Boston, MA, Global Athletics manages track and field athletes from dozens of countries and five continents, notably athletes from the United States, Ethiopia and China. Among their most successful athletes are:

- Tyson Gay (United States, 2007 World Champion, 100m, 200m and 4 × 100 m)
- Derartu Tulu (Ethiopia, double Olympic gold medalist at 10000m, former IAAF World Champion at 10000m)
- Tirunesh Dibaba (Ethiopia, twice IAAF World Champion at 5000m, twice at 10000m and 2005 IAAF Long and Short Course Cross Country Champion)
- Meseret Defar (Ethiopia, 2004 Olympic Champion at 5000m, 2005 IAAF World Championship silver medalist, 2007 World Champion)
- Liu Xiang (China, 2004 Olympic Champion at 110m hurdles, 2007 World Champion, and world record holder)
- John Godina (United States, three time IAAF World Shot Put Champion)
- David Krummenacker (United States, 2003 IAAF World Indoor Champion at 800m)
- Gezahegne Abera (Ethiopia, 2000 Olympic Marathon gold medalist, 2001 IAAF Marathon World Champion, 2003 London Marathon Champion)
- Tonique Williams-Darling (Bahamas, 2004 Olympic Champion at 400m, 2005 IAAF World Champion at 400m)
