= Pittsburgh, Atlanta =

- Pittsburgh Historic District
- U.S. National Register of Historic Places
- U.S. Historic district
- Location within Atlanta Location within Georgia Location within the United States
- Location: Roughly bordered by Shelton Ave. Stewart Ave., University Ave., and the RR, Atlanta, Georgia
- Coordinates: 33°43′45.56″N 84°24′5.88″W
- Area: 324 acres (131 ha)
- Architect: A. Ten Eyck Brown
- Architectural style: Tudor Revival, Bungalow/Craftsman
- NRHP reference No.: 06000503
- Added to NRHP: June 14, 2006

Pittsburgh
- Neighborhoods of Atlanta
- McDaniel Street in Pittsburgh

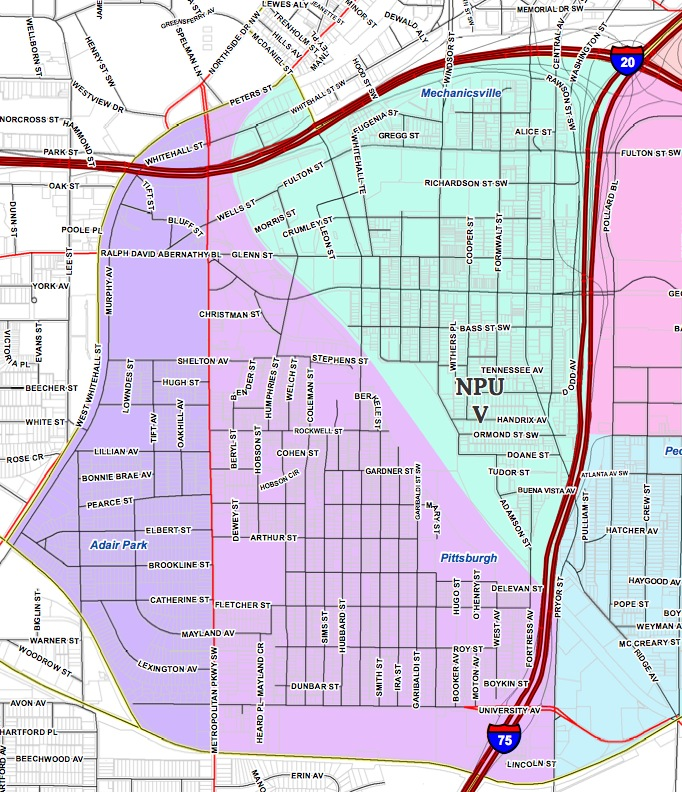
- Pittsburgh (light purple) within southwest Atlanta
- Coordinates: 33°43′45.56″N 84°24′5.88″W
- Country: United States
- State: Georgia
- County: Fulton County
- City: City of Atlanta
- NPU: V

Population (2000)
  - Total: 3,286
- ZIP Code: 30310
- Website: Pittsburgh Community Improvement Association

Pittsburgh is a neighborhood of Atlanta, Georgia, founded in 1883 as a Black working-class suburb alongside the Pegram rail shops. It was named Pittsburgh because the industrial area reminded one of Pittsburgh, Pennsylvania and its famous steel mills. Pittsburgh is a working class and developing neighborhood, and as property values rise in Intown Atlanta neighborhoods, many see possibility that this trend will spread to Pittsburgh while bringing renewal for legacy residents.

== Location ==
Pittsburgh is bounded on the northern tip by I-20 across which is the tip of Castleberry Hill, on the Northeast by a Norfolk Southern rail line across which is Mechanicsville, on the west by Metropolitan Parkway and Adair Park, on the East by Peoplestown, and on the south by the BeltLine across which is the Capital View Manor neighborhood. It shares its street names and alignments with Mechanicsville, however the two neighborhoods are separated by a rail line such that the only connections are on the Northeast and West edges of the neighborhoods.

Pittsburgh is conveniently located off I-75 and within walking distance of downtown, Turner Field, the West End Mall, Grant Park and the Atlanta Zoo. It is separated from downtown by Mechanicsville to the North. Three major downtown through-fares connect into Metropolitan Parkway, McDaniel Street and Pryor Street inside of Pittsburgh.

It is within walking distance of the Garnett, West End and Oakland City MARTA stations.

== History ==
The area of land known as Pittsburgh was on the southern outskirts of Atlanta in the early 1880s when houses began to be built there. Owned by white real-estate investor H.L. Wilson, it had many similarities to neighboring Mechanicsville, which also grew up around the Pegram railroad repair shops, but there were substantial differences amongst which was that Pittsburgh was predominantly African-American.

A working class, Black community, Pittsburgh was served by four streetcar lines: Washington Street, Pryor Street, Stewart Avenue (now Metropolitan Parkway) and Georgia Avenue (now Ralph David Abernathy Boulevard). In spite of its challenges, early Pittsburgh boasted some well-educated and self-sufficient residents. Until the 1930s, Pittsburgh housed Clark College; it also held two theological seminaries. Black-owned businesses sprung up on McDaniel Street.

Starting in the 1960s it became possible for better-off Black people to move into previously all-white areas, and many did, even as "white flight" started to the suburbs. This trend was catalyzed by Pittsburgh also being deprived of public and private investment, like many similarly situated areas. This led to the depreciation of home values in Pittsburgh and eventually to abandoned houses. Pittsburgh's population fell by fifty percent from 7,276 in 1970 to 3,624 in 1990. It had started increasing in the early 2000s before the crash. Vacancies increased during the crash, however starting in 2012, the population has started to increase again and investment in the community has increased.

=== Pittsburgh today ===
In the first years of the 21st century, middle and upper income people started moving into many parts of intown Atlanta again. This brought hope to many in Pittsburgh, at least up until the real estate crash in 2008–9, that their neighborhood would attract investment but not gentrification and displacement as had been the case with, for example, Cabbagetown. A great deal of visible change has not yet come, however there are some signs of new development. The Pittsburgh Civic League Apartments, a low-income housing project was torn down and replaced with a large apartment complex. The BeltLine forms the southern boundary of Pittsburgh, which will add park space, a bicycle path, and plans include light rail with a stop at the corner of University and Metropolitan Avenues. This in turn gives the opportunity for new development. Starting in 2012, a resurgence in BeltLine adjacent neighborhoods on the southwest trail skirting Adair Park, Summerhill, West End, Mechanicsville and other neighborhoods has increased the likelihood of Pittsburgh having a similar development and has made gentrification even more of a threat, unless longtime and legacy residents secure an equitable share of resources and investment.

In 2012 the beating of a young gay man in Pittsburgh with a discarded car tire, leading to the capture of members of a growing gang, highlighted the issues of gangs and prostitution. The incident provoked the concern of Pittsburgh's safety committee about how to get abandoned tires cleaned up. Community members got together to clean up the tires in a brownfield across from mixed-use apartments near the Northern border with Mechanicsville, demonstrating a commitment in neighborhood residents to protect the safety of its residents and improve the community.

As of 2021, gentrification, inflation, and the housing shortage have gradually driven up home prices and property values in the neighborhood. And as with the other near downtown Atlanta intown gentrifying neighborhoods, Pittsburgh demographics are steadily changing.

==== Pittsburgh Yards ====
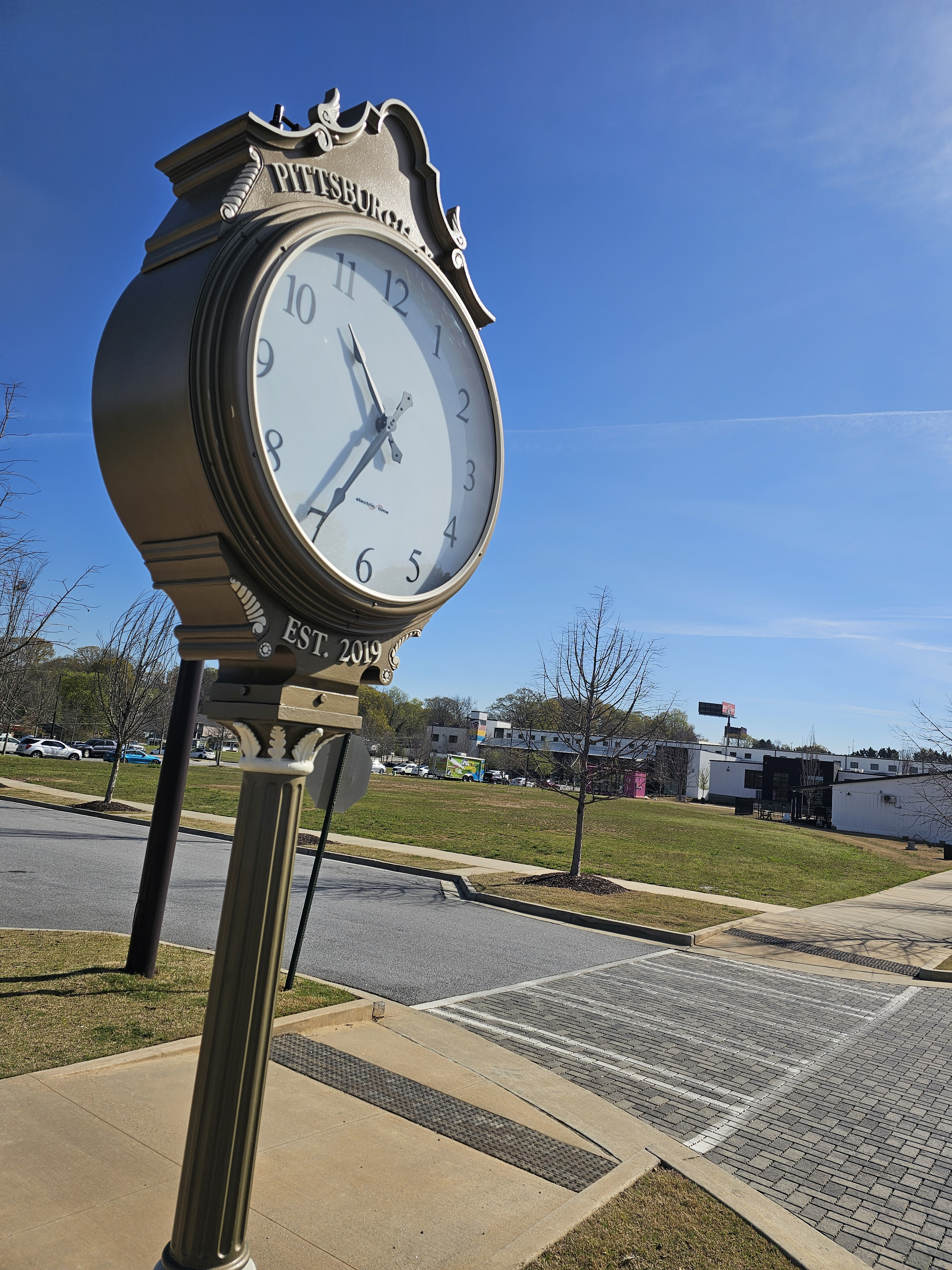
Pittsburg Yards in 2025

The car tire beating also highlighted the substantial footprint of brownfields in the Pittsburgh neighborhood and surrounding areas, with one of the largest being a 31.4 acre brownfield along University Avenue and the future BeltLine trail that dominates the Southern gateway into the neighborhood and cuts it off from economic activity. This brownfield was purchased by UPS in 2001 for a distribution center, but changing priorities caused UPS to sell it to the Annie E. Casey Foundation (AECF) in 2006 to build a park and mixed-use development. Annie E. Casey determined outreach and a Master Plan was needed for the community, which has ensued ever since, extended by the 2008 financial crisis. Early in the process, the Georgia Institute of Technology Urban Design Studio and the Georgia Conservancy created some guiding documents such as "Blueprints for Successful Communities Plan" to help develop the Master Plan with AECF, BeltLine, Inc, Pittsburgh Community Improvement Corporation, city of Atlanta, NPU-V planning unit, and residents. The Master Plan envisioned the critical University Avenue lot being developed into a mixed use of high density, parks, and connecting Pittsburgh roads into adjoining neighborhoods.

In 2010, the first obsolete structures on the University Avenue brownfield were demolished. Contemporary conferences showed that there was renewed interest in fast-tracking brownfield cleanup in the area, not only including the University Avenue brownfield, but also the brownfield formerly littered with tires on the North end of the Pittsburgh neighborhood, and Federal funds were provided. That resulted in a Background Report produced in October, 2012 describing the conditions and initiative. The University Avenue property was also discussed in the Brownfields 2013 Conference. The newly developed Master Plan also led to a rezoning of the neighborhood.

Predevelopment for Phase I of the project began in 2016. Monthly community update meetings began in 2017, and working groups composed of volunteers from the community were formed. Residents and the community voted on the name the project, with the winner being "Pittsburgh Yards." In 2018, a community groundbreaking ceremony was held and Phase I construction began. "The 61,000-square-foot building has been fitted with 101 leasable coworking spaces, a shared-use construction workshop and kitchen, conference spaces, an amphitheater and five apartment units. Upon opening, the building will serve as a hub for small businesses and makers, a gathering space for neighborhood functions and the eventual home of the Foundation’s Atlanta Civic Site office." Phase I opened in late 2020.

== Commercial districts ==
Pittsburgh's western border is Metropolitan Parkway, an important commercial thoroughfare. Pittsburgh's Eastern edge is East of I-75 adjoining Peoplestown and has a small business and industrial district. McDaniel Street also houses some local businesses, and was historically the primary through-fare for businesses. It is, however, in need of urban renewal due to blight and under-performing businesses.

== Education ==
The community is zoned to Atlanta Public Schools. A Salvation Army Center for Officer Training is located in Pittsburgh.

== Parks ==
Pittman Park is located in Pittsburgh.
