= Water privatization in the United States =

In the latter half of the 19th century, private water systems began to be a part of municipal services. As of 2011, over three quarters of US local governments surveyed by the International City/County Management Association provide water distribution entirely with public employees. Over two thirds of municipalities provide water treatment publicly, and over half provide sewage collection and treatment publicly. These rates have remained relatively stable over time.

The increased interest in privatizing public water services is an outgrowth of political forces and public policies favoring privatization of public services generally, and water resources specifically. A growing number of contracts to privatize public water services is an indicator that privatization has become increasingly attractive to many public water institutions. State legal authority for public entities to privatize water systems has aided the privatization trend. States have enacted statutes authorizing municipalities and other public entities to enter into contracts with private entities to supply water to the public.

Water corporations have identified United States public systems as potentially profitable. These are United Water, a subsidiary of the French company Suez Environment, American Water, and Siemens from Germany which acquired US Filter Corps from French Veolia Environment and runs it under the Siemens name.

== Criticism ==
In Water Privatization Trends in the United States: Human Rights, National Security, and Public Stewardship, Craig Anthony Arnold argues that private water companies have little incentive to invest in long-term improvements or maintenance of public water systems beyond the duration of their contracts.

There are other criticisms of privatization outside the classic argument of "public" versus "private", the most of fundamental example being the claim that privatization does not lead to cost savings. Mildred Warner, a professor in the Department of City and Regional Planning at Cornell University and expert of government service delivery and privatization, completed a comprehensive analysis of all published water distribution studies published between 1960 and 2009. She and her colleagues found no evidence for cost savings.

Concerns regarding equity have also been raised in discussions about water privatization. In the early 19th century, the majority of the water supply in the United States was privately owned. However, there were problems with privatization at this time. Water distribution tended to favor wealthier communities, often neglecting lower-income areas. Additionally, private companies prioritized profit maximization over the quality and quantity of service provided, as water functions as a natural monopoly. Consequently, by the year 2000, only 15% of the nation’s water supply remained privatized.

Several privatization contracts have also been terminated due to performance issues. One notable example is a 20-year contract between the city of Atlanta and United Water, established in 1998. This agreement was terminated after just four years due to concerns over poor water quality and mismanagement.

Another argument against water privatization in the United States relates to national security. Arnold states, “The critical dependence of the U.S. public on public water supply systems, surface waters, groundwater, and water infrastructure heighten the vulnerability of these systems not only to conflict and scarcity but also to terrorism and intentional harm.Therefore, we require savvy, far-reaching, effective government oversight of our water supplies and facilities for their security. Decentralized private control of waters and water systems complicates the government’s attempts to fulfill this responsibility."

Furthermore, some critics contend that privatization relinquishes governmental control over an essential resource, raising ethical concerns. The commodification of water transforms it into a marketable good rather than a fundamental human right. As a result, privatization has, in some cases, led to restricted access to water in certain areas.

== Support ==
Private water companies have been operating in the United States for over 200 years and now number in the thousands. Collectively, the private water industry serves more than 73 million Americans. According to the National Association of Water Companies (NAWC), more than 2,000 facilities operate in public-private partnership contract arrangements. Data from Public Works Financing indicates that between 2000 and 2015, 5,391 private water contracts came up for renewal, with 97 percent being renewed within the industry.

Within the United States, there is widespread, bipartisan support for the role of private water in improving infrastructure and delivering safe drinking water. The U.S. Conference of Mayors Urban Water Council, the National League of Cities, the Brookings Institution, and the White House have recognized private water companies as a viable and effective option for municipalities facing urgent water infrastructure and operational challenges.

Private water companies facilitate access to capital for infrastructure investment, contributing billions of dollars annually to improve water systems, conduct research, and develop new technologies. Proponents argue that water systems managed by the private sector can operate more efficiently and cost-effectively. Libertarian organizations, such as the Reason Foundation, assert that privatizing water systems enhances environmental compliance and reduces bureaucratic inefficiencies, citing studies that demonstrate cost reductions associated with private ownership or management. Additionally, private utilities contribute to local economies through tax revenues.

In terms of regulatory compliance, the largest private water utilities have fewer violations, fines, and work orders related to the Safe Drinking Water Act. An analysis by American Water Intelligence of EPA data from 2001 to 2011 found that NAWC members experienced 0.09 EPA enforcement actions per 1 million customers, compared to 30.03 enforcement actions per 1 million customers for all other water operators. Similarly, an analysis of EPA data from 2010 to 2013 indicates that publicly operated water systems are more likely to incur health violations under the Safe Drinking Water Act than privately operated systems. Additionally, Governing reports that public water employees face a higher likelihood of injury or illness on the job compared to their private sector counterparts.

== Impact of private sector participation ==
In 2004, the University of Michigan’s Center for Local, State, and Urban Policy released a policy report examining the implications of privatization on local and state governments in the United States. The report outlines several key findings:

- The efficiency of private versus public service providers varies by context. Cost savings from privatization are largely contingent on the presence of competition among providers.
- The quality of privatized services is not inherently superior or inferior to public services. Government oversight through monitoring and evaluation remains essential to ensuring service quality.
- In developing and transitional economies, privatization has been associated with reduced access to goods and services for low-income populations. The report emphasizes the need for comparable studies in the U.S. to understand the distributional effects of privatization.
- Although privatization may lead to more structured labor market policies, its employment effects are complex. Typically, privatization results in a shift from low-skilled to high-skilled labor and a decrease in overall employment levels, with little to no impact on net wages.
- Political dynamics significantly shape decisions regarding whether and how public services are contracted out to private entities.

The report concludes by noting that, despite growing reliance on privatization among state and local governments, there remains a limited understanding of the motivations behind these decisions and their broader consequences. Much of the existing debate tends to overlook the nuanced trade-offs between public and private service provision.

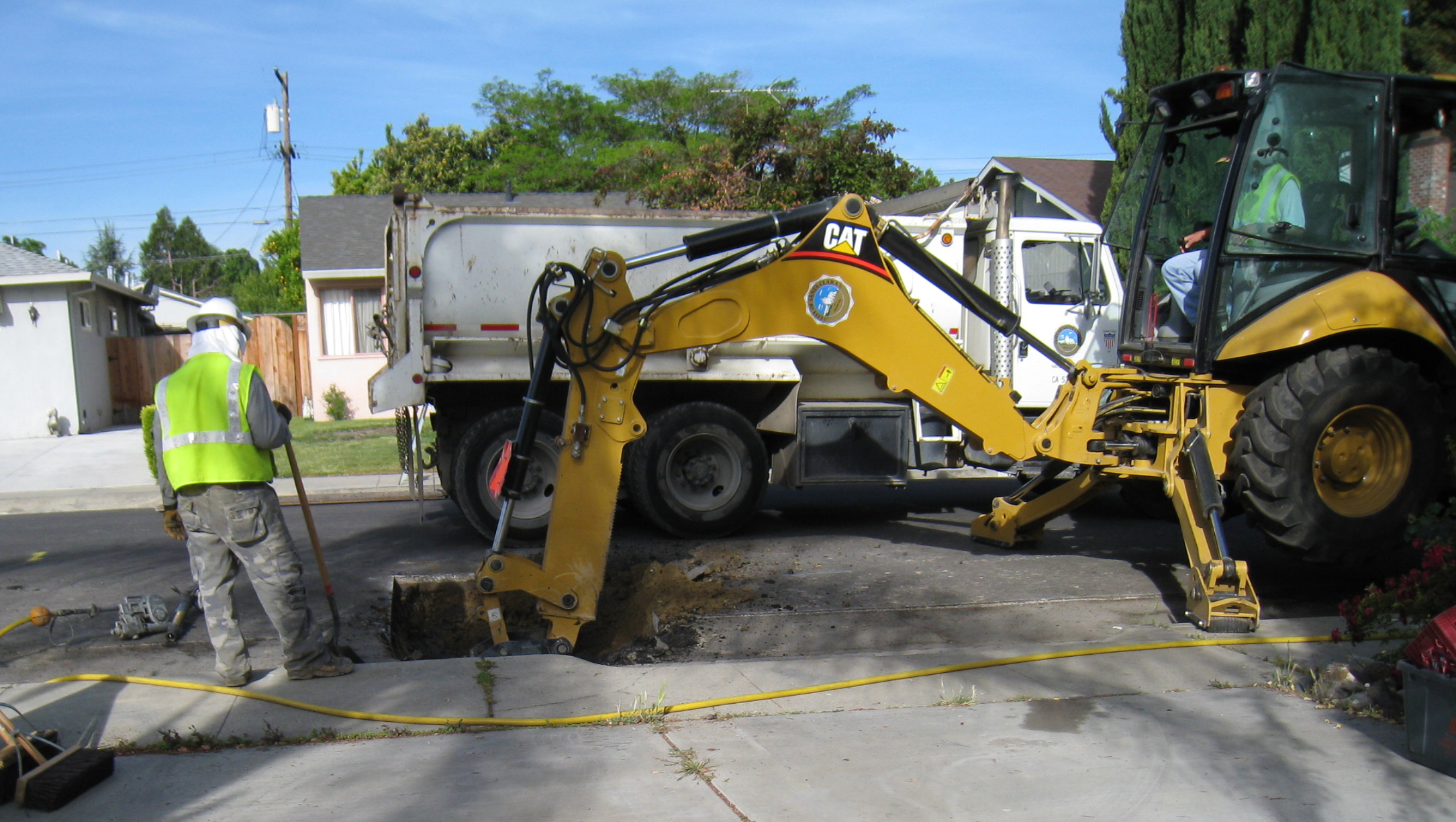
Work crew digs water line

== Cases of water privatization ==
=== Atlanta ===
In January 1999, the City of Atlanta, Georgia, entered into a 20-year contract with United Water Resources Inc. to run its drinking water system. On January 24, 2003, the city terminated the contract following widespread public complaints regarding service quality, including reports of discolored water. At the time, this represented the largest public-private partnership for water services in the United States. The decision to end the contract was made by Mayor Shirley Franklin, who assumed office after the agreement had been implemented. Challenges related to water management in Atlanta have since broadened beyond service delivery to encompass issues of water scarcity and intergovernmental disputes, particularly in the context of the Tri-state water dispute involving Georgia, Alabama, and Florida.

The region’s water management difficulties are attributed in part to legal and political structures that have struggled to balance increasing demand across multiple sectors. These demands include residential consumption, driven in large part by rapid population growth in the Atlanta metropolitan area, as well as agricultural irrigation, industrial operations (e.g., pulp and paper, textiles, chemicals, and mining), recreational uses, and power generation.

=== Detroit ===
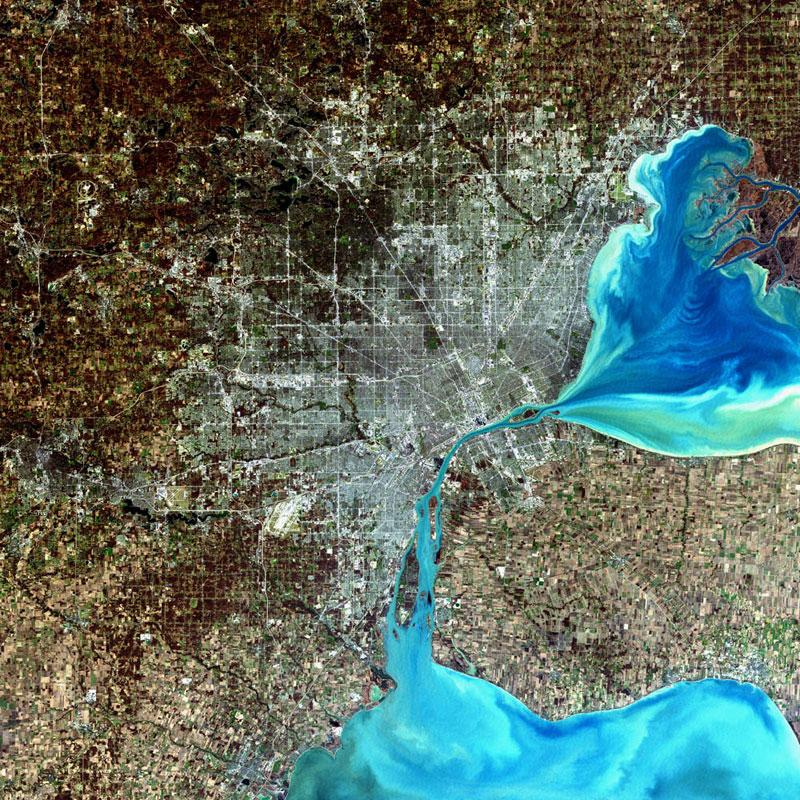
Detroit Landsat Image

The experiences in Detroit provide some perspective on what happens with corrupt government related to public or private participation. Public officials were indicted for illegally steering public contracts to specific private companies. These companies also were accused of questionable billing practices. According to the Detroit Free Press, The sprawling water system (Detroit's), with more than 4 million customers and annual revenues of more than $800 million, stretches from Lake Huron in north eastern Michigan to the town of Ypsilanti Michigan, a Detroit suburb to the south west of Detroit. This sprawling water system has provided a "flash point between the city and the suburbs because Detroit owns the system although about three-quarters of the customers now live in the suburbs." Also according to the Detroit Free Press, suburban leaders have long criticized the Detroit Water and Sewerage Department for its annual rate increases and what many considered questionable contracting practices. Due to the horse trading, shoddy contracting practices, and other forms of corruption this Detroit case may be a good example of government failure in the water system arena.

As of 24 June 2014, the Detroit Water and Sewerage Department is

"an estimated $5 billion in debt and has been the subject of privatization talks ... [it] says half of its 323,000 accounts are delinquent and has begun turning off the taps of those who do not pay bills that total above $150 or that are 60 days late. Since March, up to 3,000 account holders have had their water cut off every week."

These actions have drawn criticism from activists and advocacy groups, who argue that the water shutoffs may disproportionately affect vulnerable populations and could be linked to broader efforts toward privatization. The Blue Planet Project, among others, submitted a report to the United Nations Special Rapporteur on the human right to safe drinking water and sanitation.The submission expressed concern that the shutoffs in Detroit potentially violated residents’ basic rights and called for international attention to the implications of restricting access to essential public services amid ongoing discussions about privatization.

=== Emmaus, Pennsylvania ===
On July 6, 2005, the Emmaus Borough Council voted in a 3-2 vote to authorize its Water Committee to work with the borough's consultant to draft an agreement of sale for its water system. Citizens had been especially concerned that if the borough chose to follow the consultant's advice to "monetize the system", that the system would be sold to a multinational corporation, as was an increasing trend throughout the region. Many Emmaus residents organized themselves under the group EFLOW ("Emmaus for Locally Owned Water"), and through a combination of letter-writing, petitioning and public comment at council meetings, in early September 2005 the council voted to take water privatization off the table of options. This controversy garnered regional and national attention, with anti-privatization non-profits such as Public Citizen noting the debate and outcome.

=== Indianapolis ===
On August 26, 2011, the city of Indianapolis transferred its water and waste water systems to a non-profit charitable trust known as Citizens Energy Group, for more than $1.9 billion. Under the terms of the transfer, the City transferred all of the debt of those two systems to Citizens and received more than $500 million, which the city has used to fund upgrades to transportation infrastructure, improvements to city parks, and removal of abandoned homes.
