= Metropolitan North Georgia Water Planning District =

The Metropolitan North Georgia Water Planning District is a water district that covers all of metro Atlanta, and the nearby part of its headwaters in north Georgia. Established by the 146th Georgia General Assembly in 2001, it includes 15 counties: Bartow, Cherokee, Clayton, Cobb, Coweta, DeKalb, Douglas, Fayette, Forsyth, Fulton, Gwinnett, Hall, Henry, Paulding, and Rockdale.
