= Intrenchment Creek =

Stream in Fulton and DeKalb counties, Georgia

- Intrenchment Creek

- Location within Georgia

Location
- Country: United States
- State: Georgia
- Counties: Fulton, DeKalb

Physical characteristics
- Source
  - location: Southeast Atlanta
  - coordinates: 33.73612°N 84.34667°W
- Mouth: South River
  - location: near Constitution Road, DeKalb County
  - coordinates: 33.68178°N 84.32659°W
- Length: 8.6 km (5.3 mi)
- Basin size: 10.6 sq mi (27 km^{2}) at Constitution Road

Basin features
- Progression: South River, Ocmulgee River, Altamaha River, Atlantic Ocean
- River system: Altamaha River basin
- Bridges: Moreland Avenue, Custer Avenue, Key Road, Constitution Road

Intrenchment Creek is a stream in Fulton and DeKalb counties, Georgia. It is the largest urban tributary of the South River. Its headwaters lie beneath downtown Atlanta near the Georgia State Capitol, where the stream was piped as a combined sewer beginning around 1875. The creek emerges as an open channel in southeast Atlanta, flows into DeKalb County, and joins the South River near the community of Constitution.

Roughly 2,600 acres of Atlanta drain to the buried upper creek, and the neighborhoods above it, including Summerhill, Mechanicsville and Peoplestown, experience flooding and combined sewer spills in heavy rain. A combined sewer overflow facility on Custer Avenue discharges a mix of stormwater and sewage into the creek during storms, and the city's combined sewer system has been under a federal consent decree since 1998. The state lists the creek as not supporting its designated use of fishing. A 20-million-gallon storage vault intended to reduce overflows is under construction in Peoplestown, with completion expected in 2027. State surveys rated the creek's fish community in 2003 and its macroinvertebrate community in 2002 as very poor. A 2022 USGS study found that its heavily developed watershed had some of the highest pollutant yields among 15 DeKalb County watersheds.

The lower creek runs through the South River Forest in DeKalb County, past Intrenchment Creek Park.

== Name ==
The reference work Georgia Place-Names records that the stream enters the South River at the community of Constitution. It reports the belief of the place-name scholar John Goff that the creek may have been named for a stockade or trench of uncertain date. "Intrenchment" is a less common spelling of "entrenchment."

The Muscogee people, whose ancestral lands include the river basin, called the South River, which the creek joins, Weelaunee, a name translated as "brown water" and, in A Dictionary of Creek/Muskogee, as green, brown or yellow water. In late November 2021, several dozen members of the Muscogee (Creek) Nation, invited by opponents of a police training center planned in the forest, held a stomp dance near the entrance to Intrenchment Creek Park; Atlanta magazine described it as the first on that ground in nearly 200 years, since before the federal government forced Native Americans from the Southeast in the 1830s. By 2022, activists in the Stop Cop City movement were using Weelaunee for the South River Forest, for the park, which they called Weelaunee People's Park, and for the creek itself. Dez Miller, writing in Atlanta Studies, argued that the name came to carry an idea of the creek and its watershed as a living entity in relationship with the people around it, and that the words used for local waters shape how their history is understood.

== Course ==
The creek's headwaters begin in downtown Atlanta, on the southeastern side of the Eastern Continental Divide, and run southeast beneath Summerhill, Peoplestown and Mechanicsville. In this reach the creek is carried in three combined sewer trunk lines, named for Crew Street, Loyd Street (now Central Avenue) and Connally Street. The three lines meet near Atlanta Avenue and continue toward the Boulevard Regulator and the Custer Avenue combined sewer overflow facility. Below Custer Avenue the creek flows in an open channel. It passes under Moreland Avenue, Key Road and Constitution Road and enters the South River in DeKalb County.

In the federal Geographic Names Information System the named stream begins in southeast Atlanta at 33.73612°N 84.34667°W and ends at the South River at 33.68178°N 84.32659°W. The named reaches in the National Hydrography Dataset total about 8.6 kilometers (5.3 miles).

The United States Geological Survey maintains monitoring locations on the creek. The drainage area is 6.74 square miles at Moreland Avenue, 8.31 square miles at Custer Avenue and 10.0 square miles at Key Road. At the Constitution Road gauge near the mouth, the drainage area is 10.6 square miles and the gauge elevation is about 771 feet.

Intrenchment Creek seen from Key Road

== Access points ==
In 2024, 11Alive reported that a sign beside the creek, behind a home in southeast Atlanta, warned that the creek was subject to sewer overflows and that no one should play, swim or fish in the water. Intrenchment Creek Park's entrance on West Side Place, with a parking lot, trailhead and gazebo, lay on the 40 acres that DeKalb County traded to Ryan Millsap in 2021 (see Lower creek). Dez Miller wrote in Atlanta Studies that guided walks in the park crossed the creek westward into the former prison farm land on days when it was not too polluted or too high to cross safely, and that people living in the forest during the protests later "built a more permanent bridge across the creek". On July 16, 2022, concrete barriers and a no-trespassing sign were found at a public entrance to the park. On December 21, 2022, contractors for Millsap plowed up the parking lot, trailhead and gazebo at the West Side Place entrance, and they felled trees there the next day. On September 26, 2026, after a closure that began in March 2023, DeKalb County reopened the park's trail and natural areas as the first phase of what is now called Michelle Obama Park at Intrenchment Creek, with an entrance off Constitution Road. The $1.8 million phase included a paved trailhead on a half-mile trail that connects to Gresham Park and the South River Trail. Amy Fields-Taylor, chair of the Friends of Intrenchment Creek Park, said, "We were able to pull the trail up to the higher elevations so not to be in the river land."

== Hydrology ==
The upper basin is steep, with slopes of about 7 percent, and is largely paved. The former creek bottoms below are nearly flat, with slopes of about 1 percent. During a one-inch rain, about 35 million gallons of stormwater flows to the creek.

A 2020 study by the Intrenchment Creek One Water Management Task Force attributed flooding in the lower basin to the combined effect of runoff velocity, volume and elevation. Runoff from the paved uplands fills the trunk lines before the low ground can drain, and the low ground of the lowest sub-basin is subject to surcharge and backup from the trunk that passes through it. The study identified the downtown area draining to the Loyd Street trunk as the largest contributor to flooding. It gave rough estimates of 85 million gallons of flood volume in a 25-year storm and 138 million gallons in a 100-year storm.

The USGS gauge at Constitution Road was established in 2003 as part of the City of Atlanta monitoring program. Its streamflow record begins in April 2003, and water-quality sampling there began in September 2013. The USGS reported that 36.0 percent of the watershed was impervious. High-density residential land covered 29.9 percent of the watershed, and commercial, industrial and institutional uses covered 26.0 percent. Because combined sewer overflows occasionally occur in the watershed, the USGS excluded sample portions collected after an overflow began.

== Geology ==
Geologists M. W. Higgins and R. L. Atkins named the Intrenchment Creek Quartzite in 1981 for outcrops in excavations for a landfill beneath a power line just west of the creek, in the Southeast Atlanta quadrangle. The unit, which they placed in the Atlanta Group, is a thin layer of spessartine quartzite and spessartine mica schist. It is discontinuous and lies between the Clarkston and Camp Creek formations. It is up to 3 metres (10 ft) thick. The unit is composed of about 15 to 30 percent spessartine garnet and 70 to 85 percent quartz. Manganese-bearing garnets cause the rock to weather to a hard black quartzite. The USGS geologic names lexicon gives its age as "Late Proterozoic and (or) early Paleozoic". In 1988 a USGS professional paper abandoned the name because the unit is part of the newly named Barrow Hill Formation.

== Ecology ==
EPD places the Intrenchment Creek watershed in the Southern Outer Piedmont (subecoregion 45b). Survey results for the creek's fish and macroinvertebrates appear under Biological condition.

=== Flora ===
EPD land cover data for the watershed above its sampling station classified 7.3 percent of the area as deciduous forest and 4.1 percent as evergreen forest. A 2022 feature in The Bitter Southerner reported that some trees among the more than 500 acres on both sides of the creek are more than 100 years old. It reported that most began growing as the prison farm faded in the latter decades of the 20th century. The feature described conifers forming a high, shady canopy over a sparse floor of fallen needles, with heavier brush and damper soil toward the creek. It added that in summer parts of the forest are swampy and overgrown with thorny vines.

Sierra reported that in a 2021 public presentation the Atlanta Police Foundation described the prison farm land as "devoid of hardwood trees". According to Sierra, the foundation listed loblolly pine, boxelder, Chinese privet, Callery pear, tree of heaven, chinaberry and kudzu as invasive species there. A 2021 article in The Mainline described a canopy of loblolly pines and boxelder maples "with some notable oak trees mixed in". It noted that both of those trees are native to Georgia, and it reported Chinese privet on the land.

=== Fauna ===
The Bitter Southerner feature described box turtles and frogs in the creek and reported that white-tailed deer are abundant. It also described black vultures perching on power lines in a clearing across the prison farm, and a small copperhead on a trail. The Mainline reported that beavers were using trees on the prison farm side of the creek.

=== Environmental significance ===
The Nature Conservancy says that Intrenchment Creek Park's "tree canopy, wetlands and floodplain work together to protect" the creek. It describes the former prison farm as the centerpiece of the South River Forest park proposed in the Atlanta City Design. It says the prison farm "will seamlessly connect Intrenchment Creek and Constitution Lakes parks". The South River Watershed Alliance says the upper creek winds "through once thriving African American communities at the heart of the city", which it says "experience persistent flooding, combined sewer spills, and CSO overflow events". A 2024 study in the Journal of Cultural Geography reported that members of the South River Forest Coalition opposed the Intrenchment Creek Park land exchange. They believed it would destroy "the heavily canopied Intrenchment Creek Park along with a vital tributary (Intrenchment Creek)".

== History ==
=== Cobb's Mill and the Battle of Atlanta ===
A grist mill operated by William Cobb, a DeKalb County pioneer, stood on the east side of the creek just above the bridge on the road later known as Key Road. During the night of July 21 to 22, 1864, the Confederate corps of William J. Hardee marched about 15 miles from Atlanta to reach the rear of the Union Army of the Tennessee. The column reached Cobb's Mill at dawn and halted there to obtain guides before moving on to the Battle of Atlanta. The mill site is now within an Atlanta wastewater treatment plant.

=== Conversion to a sewer ===
Around 1875 the headwaters of the creek were piped as a combined sewer to serve hotels downtown. The pipe along Loyd Street, now Central Avenue, was one of Atlanta's first combined sewer trunk lines. As the open channels of the upper creek became polluted, they too were converted into combined sewer trunks that carried flow away from development toward the lower basin.

The Intrenchment Creek Water Reclamation Center, a sewage treatment plant on the lower creek, was built in 1910 and upgraded in 1936. In the mid-1980s the city built the East Area combined sewer facilities, consisting of the Custer Avenue combined sewer overflow facility, a storage and conveyance tunnel and the East Area water quality control facility. The tunnel, bored through rock at a diameter of 26 feet, is about 1.76 miles long.

== Water quality and regulation ==
Combined sewers carry sewage and stormwater in the same pipes. When rain exceeds the capacity of the pipes, the Custer Avenue facility discharges the mixture into the creek. The Georgia Environmental Protection Division lists Intrenchment Creek on its 2020 305(b)/303(d) list as not supporting its designated use of fishing. Total maximum daily loads have been completed for the parameters at issue, which include fecal coliform bacteria, and the fecal coliform load allocation was tied to the city's compliance with its federal consent decree.

In 1998 the City of Atlanta entered a consent decree with the United States Environmental Protection Agency and the State of Georgia covering its combined sewer overflows. A 2012 amendment extended the deadline for the city's sewer construction projects to 2027. A 2018 audit by the EPA Office of Inspector General found the city largely in compliance with the decree but not yet finished.

=== Listings and TMDLs ===
EPD assesses the creek as a single segment from its headwaters to the South River, with a designated use of fishing. In its 2026 assessment, submitted to the EPA for review, EPD reported the segment as impaired for fishing. It listed combined sewer overflows and urban runoff and storm sewers as probable sources of the E. coli and the impaired fish and macroinvertebrate communities. The segment is covered by sediment TMDLs from 2007 and 2017 and by a 2007 fecal coliform TMDL. After Georgia replaced its fecal coliform criteria with E. coli criteria in 2022, a 2023 supplement translated that TMDL to the new indicator.

=== Biological condition ===
A fish survey by the Georgia Department of Natural Resources Wildlife Resources Division on August 13, 2003, rated the creek's fish community Very Poor. The survey site, with 10.4 square miles (27 km^{2}) of drainage area upstream, had an Index of Biotic Integrity score of 16 and an Index of Well-Being score of 0. An EPD benthic macroinvertebrate sample taken on November 14, 2002, scored 7 on the sub-ecoregion index, also a Very Poor rating. The habitat assessment at that site scored 100, which EPD also rated Very Poor.

=== Sediment ===
EPD lists the creek among streams that are "water quality limited due to sedimentation". Its 2007 sediment evaluation estimated a current load of 330.8 tons per year and required no reduction. The April 2017 evaluation estimated a current load of 945.3 tons per year and set the total allowable load at the same figure, so again no reduction was required. It allocated 579.3 tons per year to municipal stormwater systems and 365.9 tons per year to nonpoint sources. EPD suggested that sedimentation in the impaired segments "may be legacy sediment resulting from past land use practices". The evaluation noted that the East Area combined sewer facilities operate as needed during storms, so traditional limits on flow and total suspended solids were not applied in their permit. EPD's 2020 permit fact sheet likewise states that neither sediment TMDL recommended a load reduction for the creek.

=== Other contaminants ===
In a 2022 USGS study of 15 DeKalb County watersheds, the Intrenchment Creek watershed consistently had some of the highest yields of all constituents except total nitrate plus nitrite. The report said these yields may be related to the watershed's impervious area and heavily developed land use. Yields of copper, lead and zinc were highest from the Intrenchment Creek, South River and South Fork Peachtree Creek at Johnson Road watersheds. Intrenchment Creek yields of total suspended solids, total phosphorus, lead and zinc were substantially higher than the highest yields in a similar USGS study of 13 Gwinnett County watersheds. A 2010 USGS study analyzed 863 water samples collected from March 2003 to January 2006 from streams in seven urban watersheds in or near Atlanta. It found detection frequencies of two fragrance compounds and the antimicrobial triclosan "particularly high in base-flow samples from downstream sites, especially those from the Intrenchment Creek watershed".

== Capacity relief projects ==
The city's Southeast Atlanta Green Infrastructure Initiative built green infrastructure in the basin in two phases, including the 5.9-million-gallon Media Lot vault and about four miles of permeable paver streets. The 2020 One Water plan described a third phase, an 8.1-million-gallon vault on Connally Street, as planned by the city. The city's project page lists the Connally vault at 7.8 million gallons with a budget of $23 million, a construction start date to be determined, and a status of inactive.

The Custer Avenue Multi-Benefit Capacity Relief Project is an underground storage vault beneath a planned park in Peoplestown, in the Custer Avenue sub-basin of the creek. The Department of Watershed Management contracted a joint venture of Ruby-Collins and BenchMark Management, with Brown and Caldwell as engineer of record, to design and build it as part of its consent decree work. The vault is designed to hold 20 million gallons of stormwater and wastewater during major storms. The five-acre site is excavated up to 30 feet deep, requiring removal of about 280,000 cubic yards of soil. The project was under construction in 2026 at a reported cost of about $160 million, with completion expected in 2027.

The South River Watershed Alliance has criticized the project, putting its cost at $156,519,692 against an original estimate of $72 million and arguing that the vault is too small to end either neighborhood flooding or overflow violations. The alliance argues that large upstream landowners should be required to manage stormwater on their own property.

== The 2020 One Water plan ==
The Intrenchment Creek One Water Management Task Force published a management plan for the headwaters in September 2020. American Rivers and Environmental Community Action (ECO-Action) led the task force, which describes itself as a voluntary group, and Sherwood Design Engineers did the engineering. Members included residents, neighborhood associations, the Atlanta Regional Commission, Central Atlanta Progress, the Georgia Department of Transportation and staff of the city's Department of Watershed Management.

The plan recommended reusing, infiltrating and slowing stormwater in the upper basin rather than relying only on downstream storage. It identified the Summerhill sub-basin as a priority because of its redevelopment timeline and its connected impervious area, the largest in the basin. It also recommended that developments study the permeability of their property before building footprints are set. The plan announced a newly created Intrenchment Creek Community Stewardship Council to advocate for its recommendations.

== Lower creek ==
In DeKalb County the creek flows through the South River Forest and past Intrenchment Creek Park. The park was established in 2003 on 136 acres given to the county by the Blank Foundation. In 2021 the county traded 40 acres of the park to a private developer, Ryan Millsap of Blackhall Studios. The county closed the park in March 2023, citing safety concerns after protests nearby. Litigation over the swap continued into 2026, when a judge ordered mediation, and the developer sought to sell the 40 acres, possibly for a data center. In 2025 a county commissioner introduced a resolution supporting a buyback of the land. In May 2026 the county announced construction of new park facilities on land it received in the trade.

The Atlanta Public Safety Training Center was built on city-owned land off Key Road in the forest. The USGS gauge at Constitution Road lies about 500 feet east of the training center site's boundary. In May 2023 SaportaReport reported that the USGS had stopped publishing the gauge's live turbidity data on February 16, citing "safety concerns" about the Defend the Atlanta Forest protests. The paper described the gauge as key to the debate over pollution from the training center. In March 2024 the South River Watershed Alliance said it had filed an administrative complaint with the USGS, objecting to a suggested new station location about a mile downstream on the South River.In August 2023 the South River Watershed Alliance sued the city and the Atlanta Police Foundation under the Clean Water Act, alleging that sediment from construction was degrading the creek. On January 16, 2024, a federal judge denied the alliance's request for a preliminary injunction, finding that it had not shown that the construction was discharging enough sediment to interfere with the creek's designated use. The city and the alliance reached a settlement in November 2024.

== See also ==
- South River Forest
- Peoplestown
- Intrenchment Creek Park

^ Intrenchment Creek Community Stewardship Council
