= Peoplestown =

- Location in central Atlanta
- Coordinates: 33.728°N 84.385°W
- Country: United States
- State: Georgia
- County: Fulton County
- City: City of Atlanta
- NPU: V

Population (2010)
  - Total: 2,612
- Source: 2010 U.S. census figures as tabulated by WalkScore

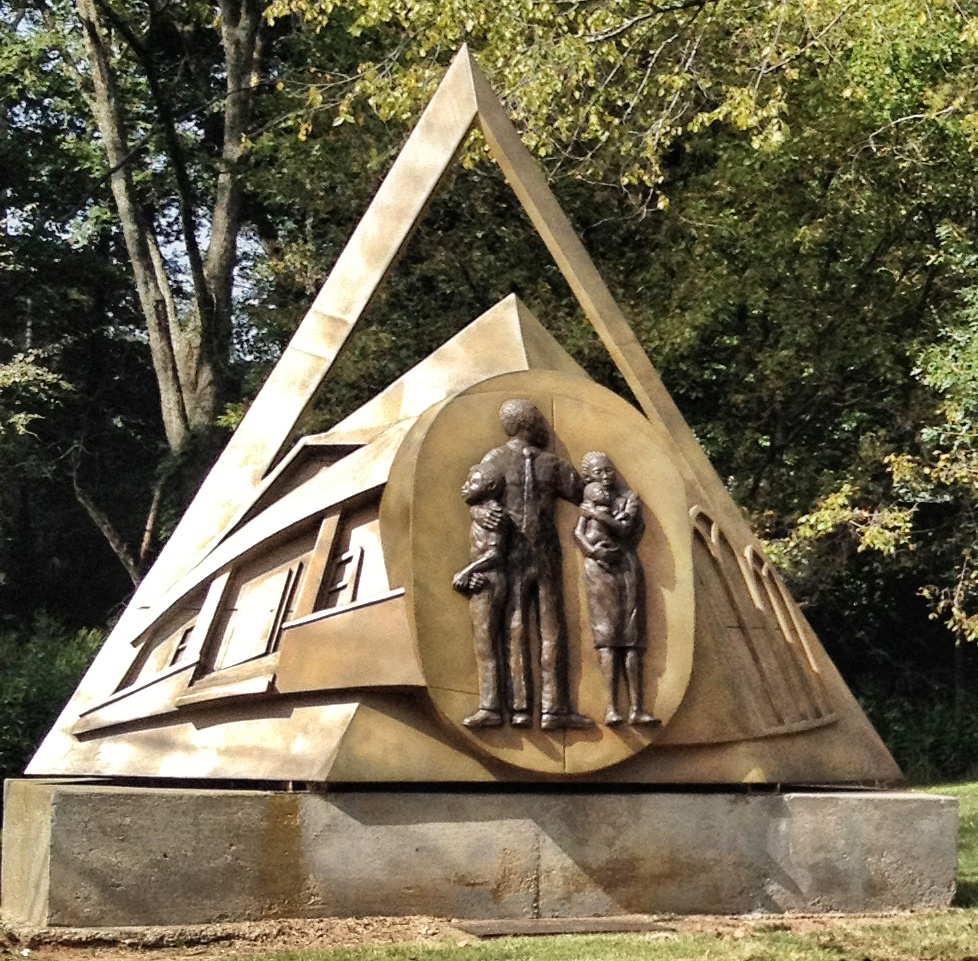
Spirit, Family, and Community, sculpture by Ayokunle Odeleye at Hank Aaron Drive and Haygood Avenue in Peoplestown

Peoplestown is a historic neighborhood of Atlanta just south of Center Parc Stadium and Downtown Atlanta.

- Ormond Street and the Summerhill neighborhood on the north,
- Hill Street and the Grant Park neighborhood on the east,
- the BeltLine and the Chosewood Park neighborhood on the south, and
- the Downtown Connector (I-75/I-85) and railroad tracks on the west, across which is the Pittsburgh neighborhood. It is part of NPU V.

== History ==
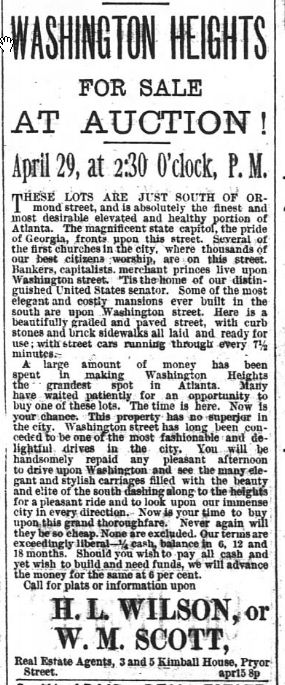
1890 ad for Washington Heights subdivision along Washington, south of Ormond Street.

In 1885, the Atlanta Electric Railway built a line along Capitol Avenue, and construction of housing began in what is now Peoplestown. The neighborhood is named for the Peoples family, who owned land there. The neighborhood developed white, integrated, and black sections. The white sections were mostly on the west of Peoplestown, and the all-black sections mostly on the east side. In addition, many black residents lived in detached units at the back of white lots.

One of Atlanta's most fashionable residential streets in the 1890s was Washington Street, running from the state capitol through the Washington-Rawson district to what is now Peoplestown. Newspaper ads in the 1890s promoted "Washington Heights" along Washington south of Ormond, now part of Peoplestown.

In the 1930s, the black areas started to receive utilities. In the 1920s and 1930s, the area became less attractive to affluent whites who could afford automobiles, which allowed them to live in the more desirable northside neighborhoods and still commute to their downtown jobs, though the 1960 census still showed a neighborhood that was about half white and half black.

The construction of the Downtown Connector in the 1960s required the teardown of some houses on the western side of Peoplestown. Additional houses were torn down in the mid-1980s when the Connector was widened, as a result of the defeat of I-485 by intown neighborhoods such as Virginia-Highland and Inman Park.

The neighborhood is represented by the Peoplestown Neighborhood Association, an advocacy group made up of homeowners, renters, business owners, and other stakeholders within the Peoplestown neighborhood. The organization is free for all members of the community and gives feedback on zoning changes and other development throughout the neighborhood to the City Zoning Department.

In the 1990s, major revitalization efforts coalesced into the Peoplestown Revitalization Corporation which has set up a neighborhood watch program and other safety programs. A redevelopment plan for Peoplestown was drawn up in 1996.

The Atlanta Beltline Southeast Trail defines the southern-most border of the Peoplestown neighborhood. As of Fall 2024, construction of the biking and pedestrian trail had begun and is expected to be completed by Summer 2026. MARTA began construction in 2024 on the first-in-the-city Bus Rapid Transit line which will run through Peoplestown from the Atlanta Beltline to Downtown Atlanta providing fast, efficient transit methods to Downtown Atlanta and three MARTA rail stations (GSU, Garnett and Five Points). The line will feature three stops in Peoplestown (Ormond Ave, Haygood Ave, and University Ave). The southern most stop of the line will connect at the Atlanta Beltline.

Peoplestown historically sat in Atlanta City Council District 1. Starting in 2026, the portions of the neighborhood were redistricted into District 4 (west of Hank Aaron Drive between Atlanta and Beltline) and District 12 (south of University Drive near Pryor). The remainder of the neighborhood (east of Hank Aaron from Ormond to Beltline) will remain in District 1.

== Architecture ==
Peoplestown primarily features single-family homes in the Queen Anne, Folk Victorian, and Craftsman architecture styles.

== Places of interest ==
- Four Corners Park
- D. H. Stanton Park has been renovated as part of the development of the BeltLine, on which it is located.
- Terminal South is a 45,625 square feet mixed-use development near the BeltLine with a food hall, retail shops, creative spaces, and service businesses.

== Intrenchment Creek and flooding ==
=== Drainage ===
Peoplestown occupies a low-lying part of the basin of Intrenchment creek, the largest urban tributary of the South River. The city's Department of Watershed Management calls the area the Custer Avenue sub-basin. Two streams converge underground beneath the block bounded by Atlanta Avenue, Ormond Street, Connally Street and Greenfield Street, where about 90 miles of combined sewer lines also meet. The neighborhood remains on a combined sewer that carries sewage and stormwater in the same pipes, so heavy rain can send sewage into streets and homes. Downtown Atlanta and the stadium area drain toward the neighborhood, and more than 60 percent of Peoplestown is covered by impervious surfaces. The city has operated under federal consent decrees since 1998 and 1999 that require it to reduce sewer overflows.

=== 2012 flood and the green infrastructure initiative ===
In July 2012 several days of rain flooded homes along Atlanta Avenue, Connally Street and Ormond Street. A deputy watershed commissioner said between five and ten homes were affected and that the city had found no evidence of sewage, which residents disputed. The storms produced combined sewer overflows that sent untreated wastewater into the neighborhood. Several homeowners sued the city, saying the sewer system had not been maintained. Mayor Kasim Reed visited the neighborhood and promised a long-term fix.

The department responded with the Southeast Atlanta Green Infrastructure Initiative, a $65 million program of sewer capacity relief for Peoplestown, Summerhill and Mechanicsville. Early work included about six miles of streets rebuilt with permeable pavers and a stormwater vault beneath the media parking lot at Turner Field. The department also proposed a park with retention ponds on the flooded block, a plan that required acquiring every home on it. In 2014 the Atlanta City Council approved the plan and authorized the use of eminent domain. The design at that stage called for gazebos and several detention ponds to treat stormwater.

=== Eminent domain dispute ===
The block held 27 houses in 2012. Most owners sold to the city under the threat of condemnation, and their houses were demolished. After protests, Reed agreed that Mattie Jackson, a community leader then in her nineties, could stay in her home. In 2016 the city filed condemnation suits against the remaining owners, including Tanya Washington Hicks, a law professor at Georgia State University, and Bertha and Robert Darden. By 2019 four households remained on the block.

The city said the block sits at the lowest point of the basin and that its modeling showed upstream measures alone would not stop flooding there. Opponents pointed to an earlier option for a pond in the Turner Field parking lot, which the department said sat too high to provide the needed capacity. The remaining owners argued that the city had not produced engineering data showing that the whole block was needed. Washington Hicks said the flooding had been "caused by over development, neglect, highways, stadiums" around Turner Field. In 2020 Al Jazeera reported on 2013 emails, obtained in the litigation, in which the engineer then managing the project wrote that modeling results did not validate the need for a retention pond. The engineer, Kimberly Scott, who managed the project until 2014, said of it, "It was environmental racism". The mayor's office responded that Scott had been involved only in the early stages and that refined modeling continued to show the project was needed.

Opponents, including the Housing Justice League, said the city was using the project to displace Black residents as the area around Turner Field was redeveloped. Some neighbors whose homes had flooded supported the plan, and one told WABE the protests were "theater". In September 2019 council members Michael Julian Bond and Andre Dickens introduced legislation to withdraw the condemnation suits, which the utilities committee discussed without voting. The dispute became an issue in the 2021 mayoral election, in which Dickens said the remaining families would stay.

In June 2022 the council approved a $925,000 settlement for a fourth home on the block. On August 15, 2022, it approved $1.975 million for Washington Hicks and $1.9 million for Robert Darden. The family of Mattie Jackson, who had died in August 2020 at age 98, received $1.473 million. Washington Hicks said in the city's announcement, "It is clear that the city will move forward with its plans". Dickens said he was "grateful for the sacrifice they are making". In 2025 Washington Hicks published a case study of the litigation in the Wisconsin Law Review Forward under the title "Stategraft: Facilitating Predatory Takings by Eminent Domain". A 2024 study in the International Journal of Urban and Regional Research cited Peoplestown as a working-class Black neighborhood whose residents reported a lack of gray and green infrastructure and unmitigated flooding.

=== Custer Avenue vault and park ===
By 2022 the city had redesigned the project around an underground storage vault beneath a park. In 2024 the department hired a design-build team and held public design meetings before groundbreaking in 2025. The city has described the Custer Avenue Multi-Benefit Capacity Relief Project as part of its obligations under the consent decrees. The estimated cost is $156.5 million, funded by water and sewer rates and federal assistance under the Water Infrastructure Finance and Innovation Act. A 20-million-gallon vault about 30 feet below street level will hold combined sewage and stormwater during storms and release it to the sewer system afterward. Excavation of about 280,000 cubic yards of soil began in 2025. A five-acre park designed by Pond & Company, with a splash pad, an elevated viewing structure, open fields and a dog park, will cover the vault. As of July 2026, the vault was scheduled to begin construction in October 2026 and the whole project to be completed in December 2027.

Residents and the South River Watershed Alliance have criticized the design for storing runoff at the bottom of the basin rather than requiring upstream property owners to hold stormwater on site. Jacqueline Echols of the alliance said, "And the lowest area, after all of that development, is Peoplestown". In 2020 the Intrenchment Creek One Water Management Task Force, which included community groups and the Department of Watershed Management, published a plan for managing stormwater upstream, including on-site retention requirements for property owners. The plan did not move forward. Critics call the project "Poop Park", a name that dates from early proposals for open ponds holding sewage and stormwater. The department said the vault addresses the root cause of flooding by adding storage and that the core design would not change. In July 2026 the Bezos Earth Fund awarded $9.4 million to Park Pride to redevelop Four Corners Park in Peoplestown, a project that includes green infrastructure intended to reduce flooding.
