= South River (Ocmulgee River tributary) =

Tributary of the Ocmulgee River in the U.S. state of Georgia

Coordinates: 33.36818°N 83.86324°W

Location
- Country: United States

Physical characteristics
- Source
  - location: Georgia
- Mouth: Jackson Lake
  - elevation: 528 ft (161 m)

Basin features
- Tributaries
  - left: Intrenchment creek
  - right: Walnut Creek

The South River is a 63.5-mile-long (102.2 km) tributary of the Ocmulgee River in the U.S. state of Georgia. It originates in the city of East Point in Fulton County and eventually flows into the reservoir, Jackson Lake. Jackson Lake contains the confluence of the South River, Yellow River, and Alcovy River and its outflow is the Ocmulgee River.

The present name "South River" is derived from shortening and alteration of the original name South Branch Ocmulgee River.

In 2021, non-profit American Rivers placed the South River fourth on its list of America's Most Endangered Rivers, citing "the egregious threat that ongoing sewage pollution poses to clean water and public health."

== River course ==
The river daylights just north of Hartsfield–Jackson Atlanta International Airport, in the city of East Point, Georgia. It proceeds to flow in a southeasterly direction through suburbs of Atlanta, eventually flowing into Jackson Lake. The mean flow on the river is 1380cfs, with a mean gauge height of 7.86 feet (2.40 m).

The most notable rapid on the river is Snapping Shoals, located on the county line between Henry County and Newton County. The shoal is classified as Class III rapids.

The dam immediately before Snapping Shoals was once used as a hydro-electric production plant to power a local machine shop.

== Tributaries ==
Intrenchment creek, sometimes spelled Entrenchment Creek, is the South River's largest urban tributary. It drains southeast Atlanta and flows south into DeKalb County, joining the river in the South River Forest. A USGS gauge on the creek at Key Road has a drainage area of 10.0 sq mi (26 km^{2}). The name is attributed to entrenchments dug along the creek before the Battle of Atlanta; at dawn on July 22, 1864, William J. Hardee's Confederate corps passed Cobb's Mill on the creek during its flanking march. It is the last South River tributary still affected by Atlanta's combined sewer system, and the city operates a combined sewer overflow facility on the creek at Key Road.

Intrenchment Creek seen from Key Road

Its lower course runs between DeKalb County's Intrenchment Creek Park and the former Atlanta Prison Farm, now the site of the Atlanta Public Safety Training Center.

== See also ==
- List of rivers of Georgia
