= 1969 Atlanta Board of Aldermen election =

- October 7, 1969; October 21, 1969 (runoff)

The 1969 Atlanta Board of Aldermen election was held on October 7, 1969, for the president and other seats on the Atlanta Board of Aldermen, with a runoff held on October 21. It was held concurrently with the 1969 Atlanta mayoral election. Maynard Jackson became the first Black president of the Board, while incumbent Board President Sam Massell won election as mayor. It was the last election for the Board prior to its renaming as the Atlanta City Council by 1973.

== Board President/Vice Mayor ==
- H. J. Jack Carson
- Jacob Boyd Davis Jr.
- Milton Farris
- Maynard Jackson, lawyer

== 1st Ward, Position 1 ==
- Lewis Frank Beeks
- Robert S. Dennis, incumbent
- H. D. Dodson

== 1st Ward, Position 2 ==
- Norris Curington
- E. Gregory Griggs, incumbent
- Jimmie L. Kinnebrew Jr
- Ethel M. Mathews

== 2nd Ward, Position 1 ==
- Morris "Friendly" Finley
- Chris Monti
- R. A. "Pete" Petree

== 2nd Ward, Position 2 ==
- Emmett Doe
- John M. Flanigen

== 3rd Ward, Position 1 ==
- Elder L. S. Follette
- Willie Hunter
- Q. V. Williamson, incumbent

== 3rd Ward, Position 2 ==
- Joel Stokes

== 4th Ward Position 1 ==
- Hugh Pierce

== 5th Ward Position 1 ==
- George Cotsakis, incumbent

== 5th Ward, Position 2 ==
- Wyche Fowler

== 6th Ward ==
- Cecil Turner, incumbent

== 7th Ward Position 1 ==
- Jack Summers, incumbent

== 7th Ward Position 2 ==
- Ira Jackson, won
- Charles L. Mundy
- Douglas Wood

== 8th Ward Position 1 ==
- Gerald Reed

== 8th Ward Position 2 ==
- Buddy Fowlkes, incumbent, won

== 9th Ward Position 1 ==
- William T. "Bill" Knight, incumbent
- Benny L. "Ben" Irvin
