= 1961 Atlanta Board of Aldermen election =

- September 13, 1961

The 1961 Atlanta Board of Aldermen election was held on September 13, 1961. It was held alongside the 1961 mayoral election.

Incumbents William Sims Jr (6th Ward Position 2) and Jesse Draper (8th Ward Position 1) did not run for re-election.

== Board President/Vice Mayor ==
- Sam Massell, realtor, member of the Atlanta City Executive Committee
- Lee Evans (i)
- Franklin Rogers

== 1st Ward Position 1 ==
- Joe Maloof
- James E. "Jim" Jackson (i)
- Charlie Smith

== 2nd Ward Position 1 ==
- Wendell C. Lindsey
- Ed A. Gilliam (i)
- Jack Dorsey

== 3rd Ward Position 1 ==
- W. T. (Bill) Knight (i)
- J. C. Daugherty
- Stanley Herndon

== 3rd Ward, Position 2 ==
- Q. V. Williamson, businessperson, co-chair of the Atlanta Negro Voters League
- Jimmy Vickers (i)

== 4th Ward Position 1 ==
- Guy R. Dunn, lawyer
- Douglas Wood (i)

== 4th Ward Position 2 ==
- Charlie Leftwich (i)
- Lester Hardy

== 5th Ward Position 1 ==
- Mac Johnston
- John A. White (i)

== 5th Ward Position 2 ==
- G. Everett Millican (i)
- Ed Garrard

== 6th Ward Position 1 ==
- T. Wayne Blanchard, lawyer (i)
- Richard C. Freeman
- F. H. "Pug" King
- Phillip Slotin
- James P. Wesberry Jr

== 6th Ward Position 2 ==
- Cecil Turner
- L. Carl Plunkett
- Comer Hawkins

== 7th Ward Position 1 ==
- Jack Summers (i)
- Dan W. Blanton

== 7th Ward Position 2 ==
- Pat (Alley Pat) Patrick
- Milton G. Farris (i)
- W. L. "Bill" Martin

== 8th Ward Position 1 ==
- Rodney Mims Cook
- Joe Salem
- R. M. "Bob" Clark
- Jim Finley
- Forrest "Duck" Smith

== 8th Ward Position 2 ==
- Goodwyn "Shag" Cates (i)
- Buddy Fowlkes
