= 1949 Atlanta Board of Aldermen election =

The Democratic primary for the 1949 Atlanta Board of Aldermen election was held on September 7, 1949 for all members on the Atlanta Board of Aldermen, concurrently with Democratic primaries for mayor and school board, and election to the Atlanta City Executive Committee (the municipal chapter of the Democratic Party). Nomination in the primary and the runoff was tantamount to election.

It was the first primary for the board since the 1946 federal court decision in King v. Chapman, which ended the white primary in Georgia and implemented the earlier U.S. Supreme Court decision in Smith v. Allwright, allowing African Americans to vote in primaries and elections for the first time. African Americans had previously been turned away from the polls in the 1945 Democratic municipal primary. The Atlanta Negro Voters League was formed months before the election to help organize African American first-time voters and endorse candidates for municipal offices.

== 1st Ward ==
=== Aldermen ===
- Roscoe C. Ailor
- Ed N. Hendrix
- R. H. "Bob" McCutcheon

=== Councilmen Position 1 ===
- Robert S. Dennis
- J. M. "Jim" Gregory
- A. C. Hopkins

=== Councilmen Position 2 ===
- James E. Jackson
- Sam S. Johnson

== 2nd Ward ==
=== Aldermen ===
- Charles Beall
- Ed A. Gilliam

=== Councilmen Position 1 ===
- Herman A. Austin
- Robert E. Lee Field

=== Councilmen Position 2 ===
- Joe Allen
- W. C. "Bill" Campbell
- E. Gregory Griggs
- Horace M. Rantin

== 3rd Ward ==
=== Aldermen ===
- ?

=== Councilmen ===
- ?

== 4th Ward ==
=== Aldermen ===
- Franklin "Frank" Rogers
- Lee Evans

=== Councilmen Position 1 ===
- E. E. "Buster" Cooper
- John T> Marler
- Neal Ponder
- Joe Wallace

=== Councilmen Position 2 ===
- Roy Bell
- Robert K. Glass
- Douglas Wood

== 5th Ward ==
=== Aldermen ===
- Dowse Donaldson
- Jimmy Walker

=== Councilmen Position 1 ===
- John A. White
- Robert A. Whitsett

=== Councilmen Position 2 ===
- O. B. Cawthorn
- Jimmy Vickers

== 6th Ward ==
=== Aldermen ===
- Raleigh Drennon
- F. H. "Pug" King
- Charles H. Smith

=== Councilmen Position 1 ===
- T. Wayne Blanchard
- Howard Haire

=== Councilmen Position 2 ===
- Ralph A. Huie
- J. Sidney Lanier
