= 1977 Atlanta sanitation strike =

Wages dispute

Atlanta sanitation strike of 1977
- Part of the post–civil rights era in African-American history
- Date: March 28 – April 29, 1977
- Location: Atlanta, Georgia, United States
- Goals: $0.50 hourly salary increase

Parties
Sanitation workers; American Federation of State, County and Municipal Employees (AFSCME)	City of Atlanta

The Atlanta sanitation strike of 1977 was a labor strike involving sanitation workers in Atlanta, Georgia, United States. Precipitated by wildcat action in January, on March 28 the local chapter of the American Federation of State, County and Municipal Employees (AFSCME) agreed to strike. The main goal of the strike was a $0.50 hourly wage increase. With support from many community groups, Atlanta mayor Maynard Jackson resisted the strike, firing over 900 striking workers on April 1. By April 16, many of the striking workers had returned to their previous jobs, and by April 29 the strike was officially ended.

== Background ==
During the late 1960s and early 1970s, several major cities in the United States, and in particular the Southeastern United States, experienced strikes by sanitation workers, including the Memphis sanitation strike and the St. Petersburg sanitation strike, both in 1968. Many of these labor disputes were also seen as a part of the larger civil rights movement, as many of those striking tended to be African Americans, and the fundamental issue behind many of the strikes was income inequality and difference in working conditions between the African Americans and white American workers.

In 1970, sanitation workers in Atlanta went on strike, demanding an increase in pay. Atlanta Mayor Sam Massell opposed the strike and fired the workers, replacing them with prison labor. However, Maynard Jackson, then Vice Mayor of Atlanta, steadfastly supported the strikers, calling their wages "a disgrace before God". Ultimately, Jackson's support contributed to the mayor rehiring the fired workers and renegotiating a pay increase for the workers. Several years later, in 1973, Jackson was elected the first black mayor of Atlanta, in an election where he had received endorsements from the American Federation of State, County and Municipal Employees (AFSCME).

By the mid-1970s, sanitation workers in Atlanta had become more vocal about a pay increase. In July 1976, AFSCME Local 1644 had voted to go on strike, but this was called off after Jackson instituted a temporary $200 annual raise and promised to find additional funds for the workers. However, by 1977, the situation had worsened. In January, a wildcat walkout occurred. Workers cited an agreement that said they didn't have to work in temperatures below 25 degrees, but many of those who walked out were docked half their pay. Additionally, workers had been calling for a $0.50 hourly raise that would have increased their annual earnings about $1,000 to a yearly income of $7,000. Presented to the city on March 10, the demand for a raise was, according to Jackson, "a package equating almost $10 million" that the city could not afford. The AFSCME refuted this by pointing out how the city government had a $11.4 million dollar contingency fund and had a $9.3 million surplus carried over from 1976. As an agreement could not be reached, a strike appeared eminent. On March 27, the AFSCME ran advertisements in The New York Times, The Wall Street Journal, and The Washington Star criticizing Jackson and accusing him of cronyism. The next day, members of AFSCME Local 1644 voted to go on strike.

== Course of the strike ==
On March 28, the approximately 1,300 members of AFSCME Local 1644 went on strike, demanding a $0.50 hourly raise. The next day, Jackson announced that strikers not returning to work within 48 hours would be permanently replaced. On April 1, following through on this, he fired 900 workers and began immediately hiring replacement workers. Over the course of the strike, the strikers picketed, dumped garbage on the grounds of Atlanta City Hall, and, during a nationally televised Atlanta Braves game at Atlanta–Fulton County Stadium, unfurled a large banner that said "Maynard's Word is Garbage". The strikers also had the support of the Coalition of Black Trade Unionists, which criticized Jackson for using "black workers as political pawns". Additionally, James Farmer, cofounder of the Congress of Racial Equality, and civil rights activist James Lawson supported the strike.

Despite this, Jackson had broad support in his opposition to the strikers. The Atlanta Chamber of Commerce, the Southern Christian Leadership Conference, the NAACP, and the Urban League all supported Jackson. Additionally, Martin Luther King Sr., father of deceased civil rights leader Martin Luther King Jr., supported Jackson. On April 4, the anniversary of the assassination of Martin Luther King Jr., two memorials were dedicated to King in the city, with both dedications featuring demonstrations regarding the strike. At one, protestors drew parallels between their own movement and the Memphis sanitation strike that King had been protesting in favor of when he was assassinated. At the other, King Sr. defended Jackson's actions against the strikers and recommended that the mayor "fire the hell out of them". Coincidentally, the Memphis sanitation strike from nine years earlier was conducted by that city's chapter of the AFSCME. Again drawing parallels to the Memphis sanitation strike, Lawson, who had participated in the strike, compared Jackson's actions to those of Memphis mayor Henry Loeb.

The strikes divided the opinion of Atlanta's black population, as it essentially pitted the city's first African American mayor against a group of workers who were predominately African American. The Atlanta Daily World, Atlanta's major African American newspaper, was sympathetic to Jackson in its editorials. Expressing the sentiment of the middle and upper class black citizenry, they questioned the AFSCME's rationale for attacking a black mayor during a time when African Americans were beginning to gain more political power in the region. In another editorial, they asked, “Why stir up a virtual racial civil strike, when we are striving to get a black elected to Congress?”

Two weeks after the firings of April 1, trash pick-up was back to 79% of its pre-strike level. By April 16, 737 new employees had been hired to replace the strikers, and 459 of those who had been fired reapplied for their previous jobs at lower pay under the Comprehensive Employment and Training Act. That day, The New York Times reported that the mayor had "crushed" the strike. The union acquiesced on April 29, officially ending the strike. By the end of the year, many of the workers involved in the strike had returned to their original job.

== Aftermath and legacy ==
Labor historian Joseph A. McCartin, writing about the strike in the academic journal Labor many years later, argued that Jackson's actions during the strike, including his mass firing and replacing of the workers, set a precedent for striker replacement that was later seen in the 1981 air traffic controllers strike. He argues that Jackson "had made it permissible to use a tactic that AFSCME had once associated only with white 'southern-type city officials'". McCartin also alleges that Jackson's staunch opposition to the strike was a way of appeasing white civic and business communities, helping with his chances in that year's mayoral election, which Jackson won with 63.6% of the vote.

== See also ==
- 2018 Atlanta sanitation strike
- St. Petersburg sanitation strike of 1968

== Bibliography ==
- Colburn, David R.; Adler, Jeffrey S., eds. (2001). African-American Mayors: Race, Politics, and the American City. University of Illinois Press. ISBN 978-0-252-02634-8 – via Google Books.
- Due, Tananarive; Due, Patricia Stephens (2003). Freedom in the Family: A Mother-Daughter Memoir of the Fight for Civil Rights. Random House. ISBN 978-0-307-52534-5 – via Google Books.
- Hobson, Maurice J. (2017). The Legend of the Black Mecca: Politics and Class in the Making of Modern Atlanta. University of North Carolina Press. ISBN 978-1-46963-536-1 – via Google Books.
- King, Wayne (April 17, 1977). "Mayor Appears to Have Crushed Strike by Atlanta Sanitationmen". The New York Times. ISSN 0362-4331. Archived from the original on November 7, 2020.
- Mantler, Gordon K. (2013). Power to the Poor: Black-Brown Coalition and the Fight for Economic Justice, 1960-1974. University of North Carolina Press. ISBN 978-1-4696-0806-8 – via Google Books.
- Prescod, Paul (April 1, 2020). "When the Black Political Class Betrayed Black Workers". Jacobin. Archived from the original on August 28, 2020.
- Scott, Austin (April 17, 1977). "Sanitation Workers' Strike in Atlanta Loaded With Ironies". The Washington Post. ISSN 0190-8286. Archived from the original on November 14, 2020.
- Shirley, Neal; Stafford, Saralee (2015). Dixie Be Damned: 300 Years of Insurrection in the American South. AK Press. ISBN 978-1-84935-207-9 – via Google Books.
