= Josephine Dobbs Clement =

American politician (1918–1998)

- Clement in 1975

Member of the Durham County Board of Commissioners
- In office 1984–1990

Member of the Durham City Board of Education
- In office 1973–1983

Personal details
- Born: Josephine Ophelia Dobbs; February 9, 1918 Atlanta, Georgia, U.S.
- Died: March 23, 1998 (aged 80) Atlanta, Georgia, U.S.
- Party: Democratic
- Spouse: William A. Clement (m. 1941)
- Relations: Mattiwilda Dobbs (sister); Irene Dobbs Jackson (sister); June Dobbs Butts (sister); Maynard Jackson (nephew)
- Parents: John Wesley Dobbs; Irene Ophelia Thompson
- Education: Spelman College (BS); Columbia University (MA)

Josephine Ophelia Dobbs Clement (née Dobbs; February 9, 1918 – March 23, 1998) was an American politician, teacher, and civil rights activist. She served on the Board of Education of Durham, North Carolina, the first Black woman to do so.

== Education and early career ==
Josephine Ophelia Dobbs was born on February 9, 1918, in Atlanta, Georgia, the fourth of six daughters to civic leader John Wesley Dobbs and Irene Dobbs (née Thompson). Her sisters include Mattiwilda Dobbs (1925–2015), professor Irene Dobbs Jackson, and educator June Dobbs Butts (1928–2019).

She graduated from Spelman College in 1937 and later earned a Master of Arts degree in home economics from Teachers College, Columbia University. Dobbs taught at Morris Brown College and Savannah State College in Georgia. She married William A. Clement in 1941 and moved to Durham, North Carolina in 1946, where she taught at North Carolina Central University.

In the late 1940s, Josephine and William Clement filed lawsuits challenging racial discrimination in schools. Clement and 15 other women leaders in the black community chartered the Durham chapter of the Links, a national service organization, in 1958.

== Political career ==
In 1971, Clement was appointed to a commission that studied the potential consolidation of Durham City and Durham County. The commission's proposed plan for consolidation was rejected in a 1974 referendum.

The Durham City Council appointed Clement to the Durham City Board of Education in 1973. She was the first black woman to serve on the board. In 1975, the city council asked the North Carolina General Assembly to make the school board an elected body; the legislation was passed in June of the same year. Clement was re-elected to the school board in 1975 and 1979, becoming part of the first black-majority school board in North Carolina. In 1978, she became the first black woman to chair the board, and remained in that role for five years.

Clement was appointed to the Durham County Board of Commissioners in 1984. She was elected to the board in November 1984, and served three terms until 1990.

== Electoral history ==
=== Durham City Board of Education ===
Durham City Board of Education election, 1975
Party	Candidate	Votes	%
Nonpartisan	Josephine D. Clement (incumbent)	3,647	44.8
Nonpartisan	Theodore R. Speigner (incumbent)	3,164	38.9
Nonpartisan	Thomas B. Bass	3,131	38.5
Nonpartisan	John D. Lennon	2,777	34.1
Nonpartisan	Harry E. Rodenhizer Jr. (incumbent)	2,740	33.6
Nonpartisan	Mildred R. Teer	2,738	33.6
Nonpartisan	James B. Maxwell	2,583	31.7
Nonpartisan	Robert G. "Bob" Ghirardelli	2,347	28.8
Nonpartisan	Trellie L. Jeffers	2,342	28.8
Nonpartisan	Lou Noel	1,965	24.1
Nonpartisan	Elva P. DeJarmon	664	8.2
Total votes		8,143 (Note: The recorded election turnout. Each voter selected up to five candidates and the top five vote getters won the election.)	

Durham City Board of Education election, 1979
Party	Candidate	Votes	%
Nonpartisan	Josephine D. Clement (incumbent)	4,762	35.5
Nonpartisan	Robert G. "Bob" Ghirardelli	4,123	30.8
Nonpartisan	Beth Perry Upchurch	4,108	30.7
Nonpartisan	Thomas B. Bass (incumbent)	4,029	30.1
Nonpartisan	John D. Lennon (incumbent)	4,021	30.0
Nonpartisan	Dennis Nicholson	3,944	29.4
Nonpartisan	Marty Pierson	3,863	28.8
Nonpartisan	Trellie L. Jeffers	3,516	26.2
Nonpartisan	James R. Lumley Sr.	3,445	25.7
Nonpartisan	William "Bill" Lawrence	1,607	12.0
Nonpartisan	Betty D. Massenburg	1,401	10.5
Total votes		13,402	

=== Durham County Board of Commissioners ===
Durham County Board of Commissioners Democratic primary election, 1984
Party	Candidate	Votes	%
Democratic	Rebecca "Becky" Heron (incumbent)	22,818	59.6
Democratic	Josephine D. Clement	19,435	50.8
Democratic	William V. "Bill" Bell (incumbent)	19,239	50.2
Democratic	R. Dillard Teer (Note: Advanced to a runoff election in June 1984. Hight and McCutcheon won the runoff and advanced to the general election, while Teer was eliminated from the race.) (incumbent)	11,319	29.6
Democratic	Louise "Lou" McCutcheon	10,647	27.8
Democratic	Albert "Al" Hight	9,745	25.4
Democratic	Brantley DeLoatche (incumbent)	8,629	22.5
Democratic	Harlan L. Laws	7,767	22.5
Democratic	Thomas E. Maddry	2,700	7.1
Democratic	Charles M. "Charlie" Stancel	1,961	5.1
Democratic	Dewey A. Davis	1,461	3.8
Total votes		38,295 (Note: The recorded election turnout. Each voter selected up to five candidates and the top five vote getters advanced to the general election.)	

Durham County Board of Commissioners general election, 1984
Party	Candidate	Votes	%
Democratic	Rebecca "Becky" Heron (incumbent)	32,141	48.8
Democratic	Josephine D. Clement (incumbent)	30,242	46.0
Democratic	William V. "Bill" Bell (incumbent)	28,364	43.1
Democratic	Louise "Lou" McCutcheon	27,064	41.1
Democratic	Albert "Al" Hight	25,023	38.0
Republican	Russell N. Barringer Jr.	19,120	29.1
Total votes		65,804	

Durham County Board of Commissioners general election, 1986
Party	Candidate	Votes	%
Democratic	Rebecca "Becky" Heron (incumbent)	26,813	60.7
Democratic	Josephine D. Clement (incumbent)	25,496	57.7
Democratic	William V. "Bill" Bell (incumbent)	24,781	56.1
Democratic	Albert "Al" Hight (incumbent)	24,600	55.7
Democratic	Louise "Lou" McCutcheon (incumbent)	21,134	47.8
Republican	Douglas K. Davidson	14,455	32.7
Total votes		44,194	

Durham County Board of Commissioners Democratic primary election, 1988
Party	Candidate	Votes	%
Democratic	Rebecca "Becky" Heron (incumbent)	12,754	64.3
Democratic	William V. "Bill" Bell (incumbent)	10,246	51.7
Democratic	Albert "Al" Hight (incumbent)	9,770	49.3
Democratic	Josephine D. Clement (incumbent)	9,663	48.7
Democratic	Ellen Reckhow	8,748	44.1
Democratic	Louise "Lou" McCutcheon (incumbent)	8,149	41.1
Democratic	Harlan Laws	5,800	29.2
Total votes		19,833	

== Personal life ==
Josephine Dobbs married William A. Clement on December 24, 1941. William's first wife, Frances, had died of cancer in 1940; they had one daughter, Alexine (born 1936). After they were married, Josephine and William had five children: sons William A. (born 1943), Wesley Dobbs (born 1946), and Arthur John (born 1948), and daughters Kathleen Ophelia (born 1957) and Josephine Millicent.

=== Death ===
Clement died of Sjögren syndrome at age 80 on March 23, 1998.

== Legacy ==
The Durham Public Education Network, a nonprofit group, established the Josephine Dobbs Clement Award in 1995. The award is presented annually for "exemplary community leadership in public education".

Josephine Dobbs Clement Early College High School, a partnership between Durham Public Schools and North Carolina Central University, opened in 2004 and is named in Clement's honor. Cecelia Steppe-Jones, former dean of the School of Education at North Carolina Central University, said that in choosing the name of the school, the program's planners "wanted something special—a name of someone who was or had been an advocate for children", and that Clement's name was ultimately selected due to her public education advocacy, social activism, and leadership.
