= Sweet Auburn Curb Market =

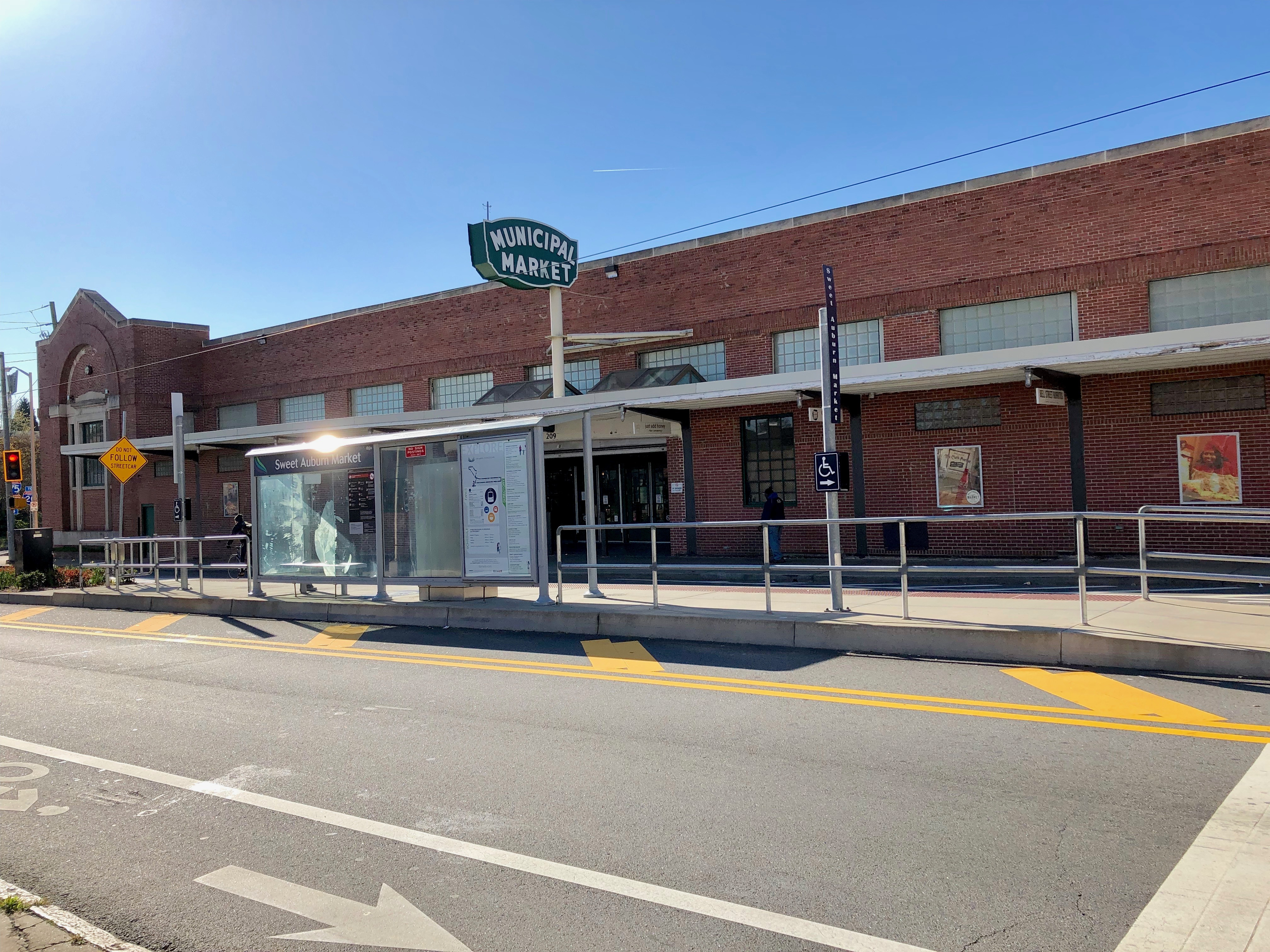
- Exterior of Municipal Market from Edgewood, with associated Atlanta Streetcar stop (2019)

- Location within Atlanta Location within Georgia Location within the United States

General information
- Coordinates: 33.7544996°N 84.3772128°W
- Opened: 1923

The Municipal Market is a historic market located in Atlanta, Georgia's Sweet Auburn Historic District at 209 Edgewood Avenue, S.W. The market operates as a nonprofit enterprise, with the building leased from the City of Atlanta and the individual vendors sub-leasing.

== History ==
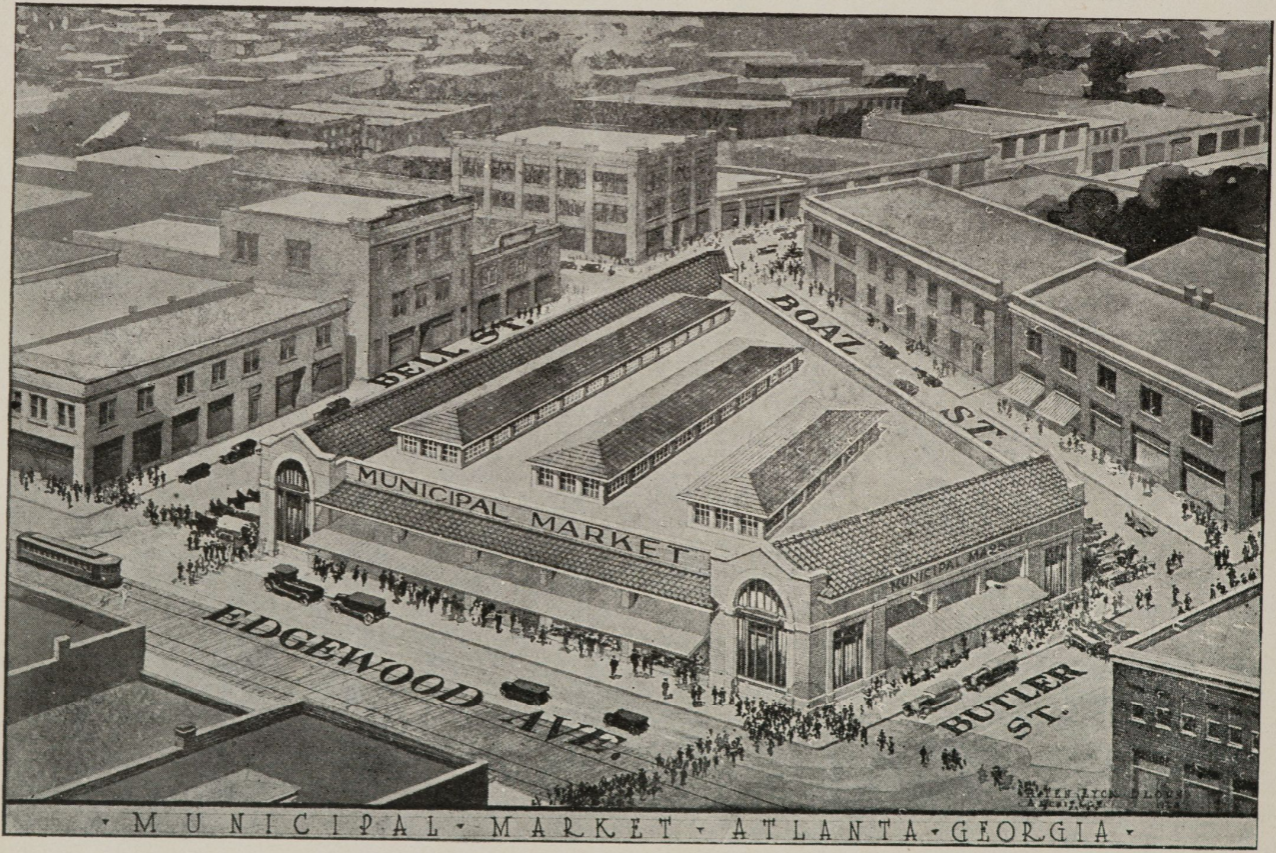
The market in 1924

The market was originally established in 1918 on land cleared by the Great Atlanta fire of 1917. The farmers' market, set up in a huge tent, was an immediate success, bringing urban consumers direct access to farmers and their products. Wishing to give the market a more permanent home, the Atlanta Woman's Club raised almost $300,000 for a fireproof brick and concrete building which opened on May 1, 1924, named the Municipal Market of Atlanta. At the time, it was located in the exact geographic center of Atlanta and quickly became "the place to shop" for every Atlantan. The market building was owned by the City of Atlanta and operated by a lessor under a 50-year agreement.

The Municipal Market quickly earned the affectionate nickname The Curb Market, partly for the neighborhood that formed around it due to prevailing Jim Crow laws, and partly because blacks were only permitted to sell from stalls lining the curb. At that time, Atlanta was still living under racial segregation; although blacks were permitted to shop alongside whites inside the market, only whites were allowed to sell from shops inside the market.

The 1950s and 60s saw the advent of supermarkets, suburbs, and integration; these resulted in many black residents dispersing from the area and consequently, traffic to the Curb Market fell, leaving vendors unable to pay rent. In 1973, with the market's lease about to expire, Mayor Sam Massell asserted the market had "outlived its usefulness" and refused to negotiate another lease, as local farmers were no longer selling their wares at the market, and the city was receiving a relative pittance compared to the value of the land. At that time, though, a "Save the Market" campaign was launched, showing the market collectively had annual sales of $2.8 million and was the largest "soul food shopping center" in the country, providing specialty cuts of meat to a primarily black, low-income clientele. A group of banks issued a million-dollar loan to renovate and rehabilitate the Market, and it continued in operation.

The City of Atlanta purchased the Municipal Market building in 1980, but sales continued to decline until Atlanta was awarded the 1996 Summer Olympics, bringing nearly $8 million for rehabilitation. The renovation of the Curb Market started in 1994 and had a grand reopening on September 26, 1997. President Bill Clinton visited the market on May 11, 1999. The building was later severely damaged during the 2008 Atlanta tornado outbreak.

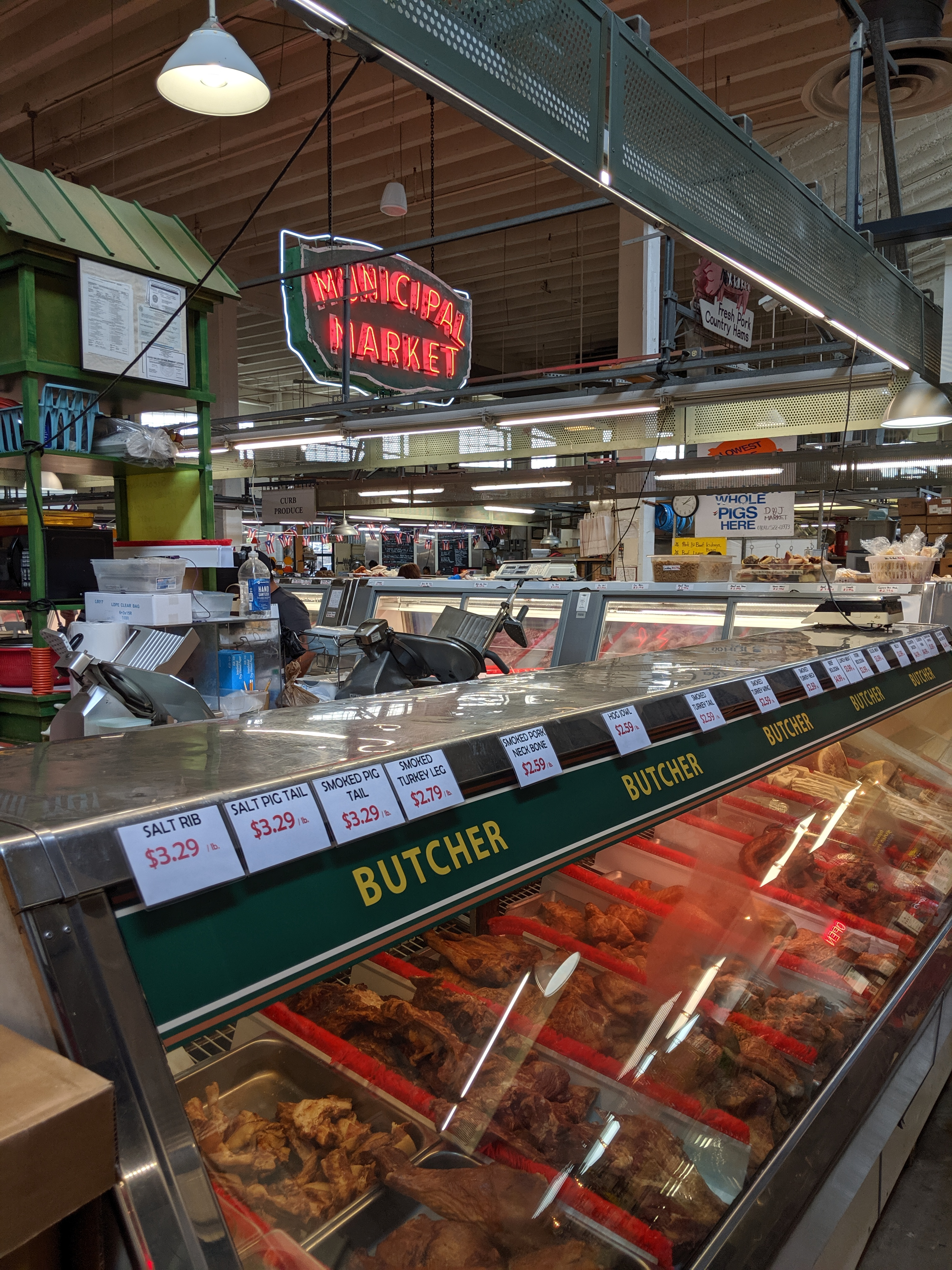
Interior of Municipal Market, featuring original exterior sign (now lit and displayed inside)

In 2010, the Municipal Market received both Community Development Block Grant funding and a Stimulus Grant for a total of $1.8 million. As part of basic maintenance and updates, a portion of the funds were used to replace the sign damaged by the tornado of 2008. Because the management was able to locate the original exterior sign and have it repaired and displayed inside the building, the city's department of Urban Design approved the creation of a replica of the sign to be displayed on the Edgewood Ave side of the building. Renovations and restoration started in July 2011 and were completed by May 2012, under the supervision of the architect Bill Clark, carried out by the J.M. Wilkerson Construction Company.

The Municipal Market was called the Sweet Auburn Curb Market starting in 1998. However, in 2018, as part of the 100 year anniversary, the Municipal Market Company decided to rebrand the market to reflect the original name.

== Design ==
The brick building was designed by the Atlanta architect A. Ten Eyck Brown. As originally built, the single-story market and entrance was flanked on either side by two-story towers, but these were removed during the first renovation of the building in the 1970s.

== In media ==
The market was the filming location for a scene in the 2014 film, Ride Along, which takes place and was filmed in Atlanta. It is also featured in the ABC television series Kevin (Probably) Saves the World, appearing in scenes for the thirteenth episode, entitled "Fishtail".

== Tenants ==
Vendors within the market are individually owned businesses and offer goods including meat, fish, baked goods, vegetables, fruit, nuts, coffee, plants, groceries, and more. Additionally, there are many restaurants located in the market, including several that have gone on to start stand-alone restaurants, such as Grindhouse Killer Burgers and Bell Street Burritos. The Market is seen by some as a place to incubate a small business.

== Transportation ==
The Market is served by the Atlanta Streetcar at the Sweet Auburn Market station.

Services at Sweet Auburn Market station
Preceding station	MARTA	Following station
Hurt Park One-way operation	Atlanta Streetcar	Edgewood at Hilliard toward King Historic District
