= 1957 Atlanta Board of Aldermen election =

- May 8, 1957

The 1957 Atlanta Board of Aldermen election was held on May 8, 1957 for all seats on the Atlanta Board of Aldermen. It was held concurrently with elections for mayor and school board.

== Board President ==
- Lee Evans

== 1st Ward Position 1 ==
- James E. "Jim" Jackson (i)
- Joe Salem

== 2nd Ward Position 1 ==
- Ed A. Gilliam (i)
- Wendell Lindsey

== 3rd Ward Position 1 ==
- W. T. (Bill) Knight (i)

== 3rd Ward, Position 2 ==
- Jimmy Vickers (i)
- Clarence Welch

== 4th Ward Position 1 ==
- Douglas Wood (i)

== 4th Ward Position 2 ==
- Charlie Leftwich (i)
- Dean Callaway

== 5th Ward Position 1 ==
- John A. White (i)

== 5th Ward Position 2 ==
- G. Everett Millican (i)

== 6th Ward Position 1 ==
- T. Wayne Blanchard, lawyer (i)

== 6th Ward Position 2 ==
- William Sims Jr (i)

== 7th Ward Position 1 ==
- Jack Summers (i)
- Lanier Randall
- T. M. Alexander

== 7th Ward Position 2 ==
- Milton G. Farris (i)
- Calhoun Long

== 8th Ward Position 1 ==
- Jesse Draper
- Thomas Stubbs Jr

== 8th Ward Position 2 ==
- Goodwyn "Shag" Cates
- R. M. "Bob" Clark
- Sam Jones
