= Atlanta Streetcar =

Streetcar line in Atlanta, Georgia

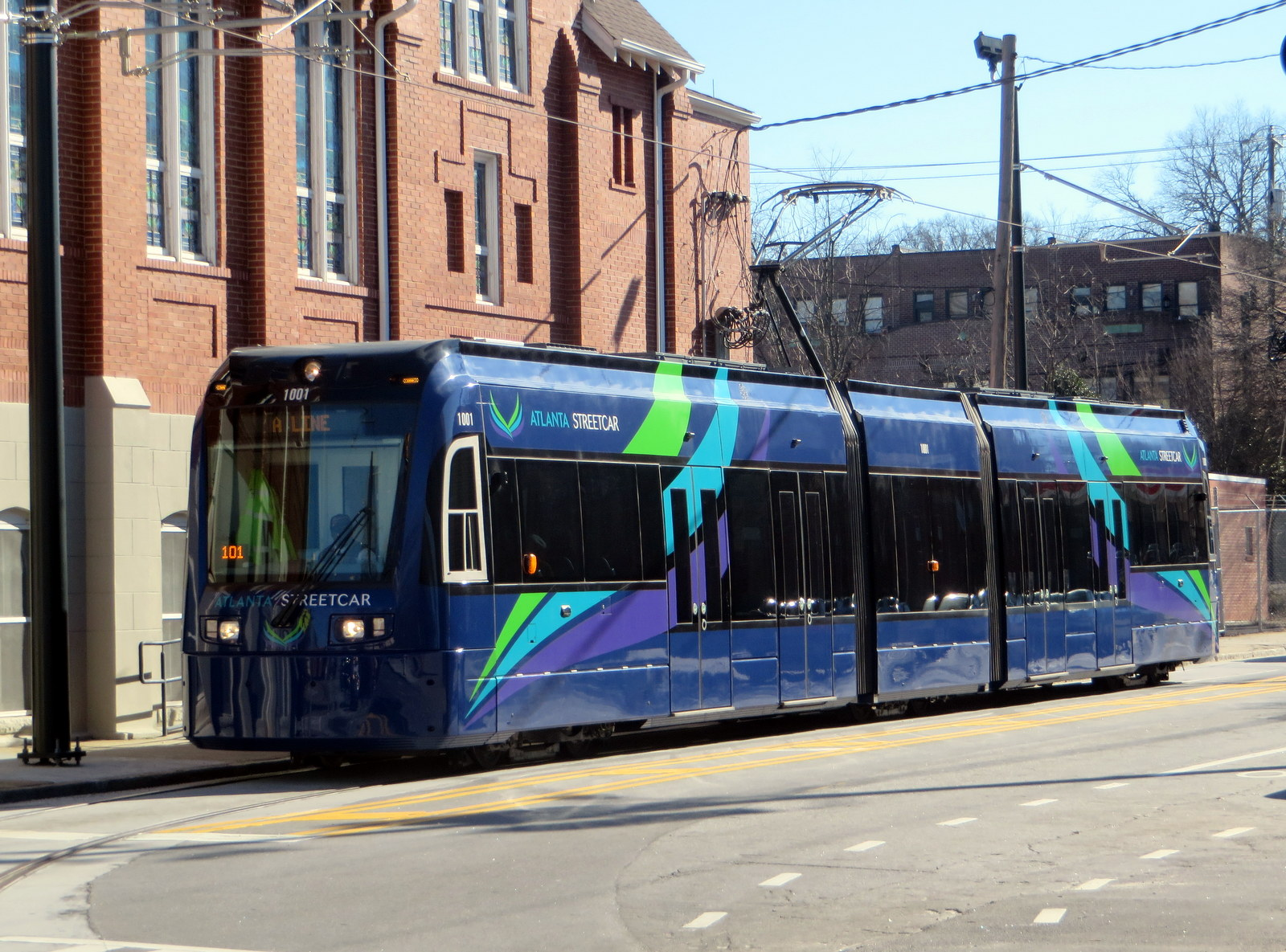

Overview
- Owner: MARTA
- Locale: Atlanta, Georgia, United States
- Transit type: Streetcar
- Number of lines: 1
- Number of stations: 12
- Daily ridership: 600 (weekdays, Q2 2026)
- Annual ridership: 218,500 (2025)

Operation
- Began operation: December 30, 2014; 11 years ago
- Character: At-grade street running
- Rolling stock: 4 × Siemens S70
- Train length: 1 car
- Headway: 15 minutes (planned avg.)

Technical
- System length: 2.7 mi (4.3 km)
- Track gauge: 4 ft 8 1/2 in (1,435 mm) standard gauge
- Electrification: Overhead line, 750 V DC
System map
Atlanta Streetcar highlighted in cyan

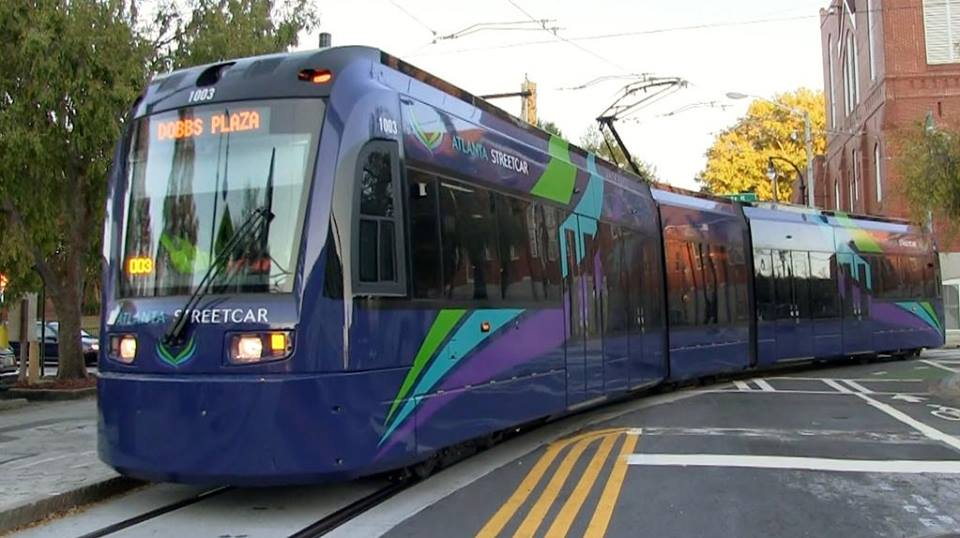
A streetcar approaching the King Historic District stop, in 2017

The Atlanta Streetcar (also known as the Downtown Loop) is a streetcar line in Atlanta, Georgia. Testing on the line began in summer 2014 with passenger service beginning as scheduled on December 30, 2014. In 2025, the line had 218,500 rides.

The Downtown Loop is the Phase 1 of the Atlanta Streetcar project, which is planning to expand onto the BeltLine surrounding central Atlanta. The project is the first regular passenger streetcar service in Atlanta since the original Atlanta streetcars were phased out in 1949.

== Operations ==
=== Route ===
The Downtown Loop runs 2.7 miles (4.3 km) east-west, serving 12 stops, from Centennial Olympic Park to the Martin Luther King, Jr. National Historic Site, with tracks that converge at Woodruff Park. The route provides access to MARTA heavy rail lines at Peachtree Center. The vehicle maintenance facility is located under the I-75/I-85 overpass on Edgewood Avenue

The exact route is:

- From the King Historic Site at Jackson Street and Auburn Avenue, westbound along Auburn Avenue to Peachtree Street.
- North on Peachtree Street, stopping at Peachtree Center MARTA station, to Ellis Street.
- West on Ellis Street to Carnegie Way.
- Northwest on Carnegie Way to Andrew Young International Boulevard.
- West on Andrew Young International Blvd. to Centennial Olympic Park Drive.
- South on Centennial Olympic Park Drive to Luckie Street.
- Southeast on Luckie Street, crossing Peachtree Street to Park Place.
- South on Park Place to Edgewood Avenue.
- East on Edgewood Avenue to Jackson Street.
- North on Jackson Street to Auburn Avenue.

=== Rolling stock ===
The Atlanta Streetcar system uses Siemens S70 light rail vehicles (LRVs). A total of four S70 cars were purchased and were built at two different facilities; the cars themselves were built in Sacramento, California while most other major components, like the propulsion system, were assembled at a plant about 30 miles (48 km) north of Atlanta, in Alpharetta. They were delivered in the first months of 2014 and are numbered 1001–1004.

== History ==
=== Atlanta Streetcar, Inc. ===
Atlanta Streetcar, Inc. (ASC) is a non-profit organization founded in 2003 with the mission to bring streetcars back to downtown Atlanta. ASC's board members include the leaders of Georgia Tech and Georgia State University, MARTA, Georgia World Congress Center, Buckhead Community Improvement District, Buckhead Coalition, Underground Atlanta, Central Atlanta Progress, Woodruff Arts Center, and many local corporate business leaders as well.

=== Peachtree Corridor Partnership ===
In the summer of 2007, a new privately funded group called the Peachtree Corridor Partnership was formed, with the goal of determining how best to move forward the proposed rebuilding of Peachtree Street as a more attractive and pedestrian-friendly thoroughfare. The addition of a modern streetcar line was (and remains) one of the main components of the proposed transformation of the corridor, so many of the board members of ASC became members of the Peachtree Corridor Task Force, and the partnership eventually replaced the function of ASC as the organization advocating for a streetcar line along Peachtree Street.

In July 2009, the Atlanta city council approved funding a feasibility study to work out certain details of the proposed streetcar line in time to apply for federal economic-stimulus funds for the construction of such a line. However, several council members later expressed doubts over whether the remainder of the funding necessary to bring the project to fruition was likely, particularly during a time of recession.

=== Downtown Loop route funded ===
In September 2010, it was announced that Phase I of the Atlanta Streetcar Project had received $47 million in federal Transportation Investment Generating Economic Recovery (TIGER) II funding. The funding represents 8% of the overall TIGER II allotment, and will fund the construction of the downtown loop, not the Peachtree Corridor line, which is now regarded as Phase V of the project.

In May 2011, Siemens announced that it had won the $17.2 million contract to build the four streetcars that will run on the Downtown Connector line. They would be based on the company's S70 light rail vehicle platform, with the cars themselves being built in Sacramento, California, while other major components, including the propulsion system, were to be assembled at a Siemens plant about 30 miles (48 km) north of Atlanta, in Alpharetta.

In February 2012, the city announced that the budget would increase from $70 million to $90 million. The city attributed the increase to:

- about $9 million to purchase newer and more expensive streetcars that could last 20 years longer than the refurbished ones that were originally planned to be purchased
- $4 million so that the Atlanta Regional Commission's Livable Centers Initiative could provide grants for sidewalk improvements and bicycle lanes.
- Additional work by the water department to move water and sewer pipes

In March 2012, the MARTA Board of Directors formally approved the design-build contract with URS Corporation for the Atlanta Streetcar.

=== Construction and opening ===
Groundbreaking for the project took place on February 1, 2012. At that time, the line was projected to open in May 2013, but various delays pushed the opening back, first to summer 2014 and later to December. The first two S70 streetcars were delivered in February 2014 and began test runs on the line in the spring. The initial 2.7 mile loop cost $98M which was almost $30M higher than originally projected.

The 2.7-mile (4.3 km) loop opened for service on December 30, 2014, with all rides free until January 1, 2016.

=== MARTA takeover ===
By June 2018, MARTA agreed to take control and ownership of the streetcar; the route is planned to be integrated into a larger MARTA light rail system. Operations were placed under the control of the newly formed Office of Light Rail Operations on July 1, 2018.

== Beltline expansion ==
In 2015, the city of Atlanta applied for a TIGER 7 grant in 2015 to fund an Atlanta Beltline public transit expansion project, but was unsuccessful.

In November 2016, 71% of Atlanta voters approved a half-penny sales tax increase to fund More MARTA projects, projected to raise $2.5 billion over 40 years, to fund additional bus rapid transit lines, light rail, and infill stations. $66 million was allocated to buying the remaining right-of-way to complete the Atlanta BeltLine loop. The tax increase became effective in March 2017.

In October 2018, MARTA's board approved a concrete list of "More MARTA" projects, including $570 million to build a streetcar line on 15 miles of the Atlanta Beltline, to fulfill the BeltLine's original vision as a multimodal transportation corridor offering light rail transit and urban trails. The first phase of expansion, known as the Streetcar East Extension, was scheduled to begin operations in 2028. The extension planned to extend streetcar tracks by 2 miles, east along Edgewood Avenue, Randolph St, and Auburn Ave, then north along the BeltLine to Ponce City Market, and five new light rail stations. In June 2023, MARTA selected a designer for the extension. In March 2024, the extension was estimated to cost $200 million. Construction was forecasted to begin in 2025.

In March 2025, Atlanta mayor Andre Dickens withdrew his support from the Streetcar East Extension, and reprioritized a streetcar extension into the Southside corridor instead. Various lobbying groups (including developer-funded astroturfing group Better Atlanta Transit) had lobbied against this extension, while advocates (including grassroots group Beltline Rail Now) criticized the late-breaking decision.

== List of streetcar stations ==
Counter-clockwise loop between Centennial Olympic Park and King Historic District

Stop	Direction	Notes
Centennial Olympic Park	Southbound	Serves Centennial Olympic Park, CNN Center, Georgia Aquarium, Mercedes-Benz Stadium, GWCC, National Center for Civil and Human Rights, State Farm Arena and World of Coca-Cola; Terminus
Luckie at Cone	Eastbound	Serves Fairlie−Poplar Historic District
Park Place	Southbound	Serves Woodruff Park and Underground Atlanta (walking distance)
Hurt Park	Eastbound	Serves Georgia State Capitol, Georgia State University and Hurt Park
Sweet Auburn Market	Eastbound	Island side platform in middle of street Serves Grady Hospital and Sweet Auburn Curb Market
Edgewood at Hilliard	Eastbound	In walking distance of Selena S. Butler Park
King Historic District	Westbound	Intersection of Auburn and Jackson Streets; Serves Martin Luther King Jr. National Historical Park and Oakland Cemetery (walking distance)
Dobbs Plaza	Westbound	Platform located under the Downtown Connector (I-75/85); Serves Dobbs Plaza and Sweet Auburn
Auburn at Piedmont	Westbound	Serves Calhoun Park
Woodruff Park	Westbound	Serves Woodruff Park
Peachtree Center	Northbound	Direct connection to MARTA rapid transit at Peachtree Center station Serves Peachtree Center district
Carnegie at Spring	Westbound	Serves Fairlie−Poplar Historic District; Final stop before reaching terminus at Centennial Olympic Park stop

== Criticism ==
Since opening for service, the Atlanta Streetcar has been criticized by officials and residents for its short route, safety, poor management, and lower-than-expected ridership. Although boosters have claimed that up to $2.5 billion worth of new development can be attributed to the streetcar, independent analysis shows that many of those projects (totaling at least $323 million) pre-date it, and others—such as the College Football Hall of Fame—had not taken the streetcar into consideration. Regardless, the streetcar has contributed to at least some economic growth; for example, Southeast Capital Companies stated that it directly influenced their decision to build residential housing near Edgewood Avenue, and the Atlantic Seafood Market saw business rise 10% in the months following the start of service.

In September 2015, officials from the Federal Transit Administration expressed concerns with the system's lack of safety, poor management, and failure to comply with requirements for reporting accidents. Atlanta mayor Kasim Reed and MARTA CEO Keith Parker have laid out steps to address those issues.

On May 23, 2016, state officials sent a letter to then-mayor Kasim Reed and MARTA CEO Keith Parker threatening to shut down the streetcar unless the city fixed numerous problems with it that had been outlined in multiple then-recent audits.

== See also ==
- Light rail in the United States
- Streetcars in North America
- Nine-Mile Circle streetcar line to Virginia Highland
- Timeline of mass transit in Atlanta
