= 1965 Atlanta Board of Aldermen election =

- September 8, 1965; September 16, 1965 (runoff)

The 1965 Atlanta Board of Aldermen election was held on September 8, 1965, with a runoff for some seats held on September 16, 1965. Sam Massell won re-election as Vice Mayor and board president against five other candidates. Q. V. Williamson became the first Black member of the board since Reconstruction.

== Board President/Vice Mayor ==
- Sam Massell (inc.)
- Saul Blau

== 1st Ward Position 1 ==
- Robert S. Dennis

== 1st Ward Position 2 ==
- Robert Sharpton

== 2nd Ward Position ? ==
- John M. Flanigen

== 3rd Ward Position 2 ==
- Q. V. Williamson
- Jimmy Vickers (i)
- Stanley Herndon

== 4th Ward Position 1 ==
- Douglas Wood
- Jack L. Wilkerson
- Dozier Smith

== 4th Ward Position 2 ==
- William S. "Bill" Stephens

== 5th Ward Position ? ==
- G. Everett Millican
- George Cotsakis

== 6th Ward Position 1 ==
- Jack Sells
- Alfred Friedman

== 6th Ward Position 2 ==
- Cecil Turner
- Larry Lewis
- Beverly H. Nash

== 7th Ward Position 1 ==
- Buddy Fowlkes
- Nick Belluso

== 8th Ward ==
- Ian F. Stalker
- Rodney Mims Cook
- Buddy Fowlkes
- E. Earl Patton Jr
