= Alexine Clement Jackson =

Alexine Clement Jackson (born 1936) was the Chair, Board of Directors of Susan G. Komen and former National President of the Young Women's Christian Association (YWCA). She is the immediate past president of Black Women's Agenda and former Chair, the National Museum of Women in the Arts.

== Early life ==
Clement-Jackson was born in Sumter, South Carolina on June 10, 1936. She was four years old when her mother, Francis died of breast cancer. She was raised by her father, William A. Clement and her stepmother, Josephine Dobbs Clement, a 1937 graduate of Spelman College. Her father was a senior executive for North Carolina Mutual and Grandmaster of the Prince Hall Masons in North Carolina, while her stepmother, daughter of civic leader John Wesley Dobbs, would become a distinguished professor at North Carolina Central University and civil rights activist. The Clement-Dobbs Early College High School in Durham is named in Josephine's honor. Her parents stressed education and service and as a result, Clement-Jackson excelled academically. She graduated magna cum laude from Spelman College in 1956 and received her master's degree in speech pathology and audiology from the University of Iowa.

== Career ==
In 1973, she and her husband Aaron G. Jackson moved to Washington, DC, when he took a position at Howard University. Dr. Jackson would eventually become Chief of the Urology Department. Clement-Jackson began her involvement with the YWCA not long after YWCA passed the One Imperative agenda, which sought to eliminate racism. Clement-Jackson worked closely with the YWCA's National Office for Racial Justice, which was headed for many years by Dorothy Height. Clement-Jackson also facilitated services for women, which included, shelters for victims of domestic violence and childcare centers. During her term as president of the YWCA, she was a member of the United States delegation to YWCA World Council meetings in Seoul, Korea, and Cairo, Egypt, and joined a 10-member World YWCA delegation for a fact-finding mission in the Middle East.

In addition to her five-year term as national president, Clement-Jackson is the immediate past president of Black Women's Agenda and recently retired from the board of The National Museum of Women in the Arts after 12 years of service. She is also a recent past chair of the Community Foundation for the National Capital Region.

== Cancer survivor ==
She was diagnosed with breast cancer and underwent chemotherapy, radiation therapy and hormonal therapy. A 23-year breast cancer survivor, Clement-Jackson has been a long-time advocate and public spokesperson for cancer prevention, early detection and quality health care for all. She is a current board member and past chair of the Intercultural Cancer Council, an organization which addresses the unequal burden of cancer in racial, ethnic and other medically underserved populations. She is also a board member emerita of Prevent Cancer Foundation (formerly Cancer Research and Prevention Foundation).

== Awards ==
- Doctor of Humane Letters from Spelman College in Atlanta, Ga. (1998);
- Spirit of Civic Giving Award by The Community Foundation of the National Capital Region (2006); Dorothy I. Height Leadership Service Award (2005)
- Interfaith Conference of Metro Washington Community Service Award (with husband) (2004)
- The Black Women's Agenda Community Service Award (2001)
- Washington Woman Magazine's Woman of the Year (1985)
