= Hurt Park =

Hurt Park may refer to:

- Hurt Park (Atlanta), a public park in Atlanta
- Hurt Park, Roanoke, Virginia, a neighborhood in Roanoke, Virginia
