= 1949 Atlanta mayoral election =

The Democratic primary for the 1949 Atlanta mayoral election was held on September 7, 1949, concurrently with Democratic primaries for the board of aldermen and school board, and election to the Atlanta City Executive Committee (the municipal chapter of the Democratic Party). Nomination in the primary and the runoff was tantamount to election. Incumbent William Hartsfield won re-election in the primary by 47 votes.

== African American voters ==
It was the first primary for the board since the 1946 federal court decision in King v. Chapman, which ended the white primary in Georgia and implemented the earlier U.S. Supreme Court decision in Smith v. Allwright, allowing African Americans to vote in primaries and elections for the first time. African Americans had previously been turned away from the polls in the 1945 Democratic municipal primary. The Atlanta Negro Voters League was formed months before the election to help organize African American first-time voters and endorse candidates for municipal offices. Both Hartsfield and Brown sought African American support in the primary.

== Candidates ==
- William B. Hartsfield, incumbent mayor
- Charlie Brown, Fulton County commissioner
- Bill Todd
- Joe Salem

== Results ==
1949 Atlanta mayoral primary
Party	Candidate	Votes	%
Nonpartisan	William B. Hartsfield	20,074	50.12
Nonpartisan	Charlie Brown	17,253	43.07
Nonpartisan	Bill Todd	1,617	4.04
Nonpartisan	Joe Salem	1,111	2.77
Total votes		40,055	100
