= Mattiwilda Dobbs =

American opera singer (1925–2015)

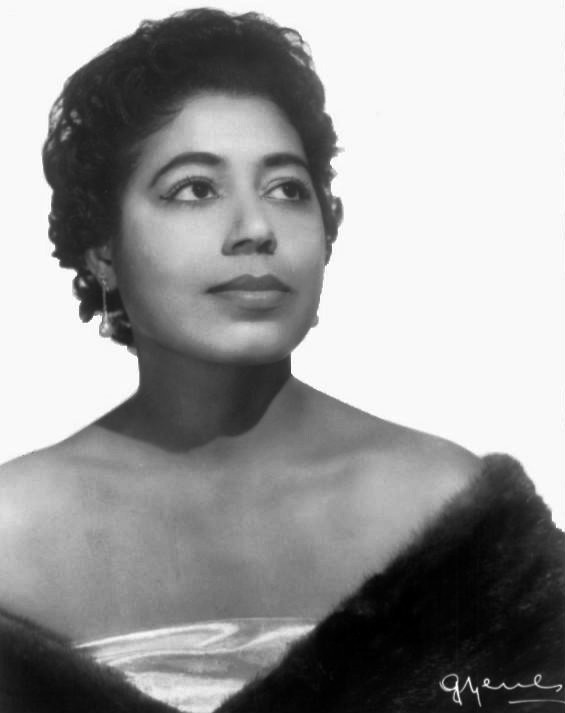
- Dobbs in 1957
- Born: July 11, 1925; Atlanta, Georgia, U.S.
- Died: December 8, 2015 (aged 90); Atlanta, Georgia, U.S.
- Education: Music and Spanish degree, Spelman College, 1946
- Occupation: Opera singer
- Years active: 1951–1974
- Known for: First successful African-American woman at the Metropolitan Opera
- Spouse: Luis Rodriguez (1954–1955) Bengt Janzon (1957–1997)
- Father: John Wesley Dobbs
- Relatives: June Dobbs Butts (sister); Josephine Dobbs Clement (sister); Irene Dobbs Jackson (sister); Maynard Jackson (nephew)

Mattiwilda Dobbs (July 11, 1925 – December 8, 2015) was an American coloratura soprano and was one of the first black singers to enjoy a major international career in opera. She was the first black singer to perform at La Scala in Italy, the first black woman to receive a long-term performance contract and to sing a lead role at the Metropolitan Opera, New York and the first black singer to play a lead role at the San Francisco Opera.

== Biography ==
Dobbs was born in Atlanta, Georgia, one of six daughters of John and Irene Dobbs, who were leaders in the state's African-American community. She had five sisters, including activist and civic leader Josephine Dobbs Clement (1918–1998), professor Irene Dobbs Jackson, and educator June Dobbs Butts (1928–2019). Dobbs began piano lessons at the age of seven, and sang in community and church choirs.

=== Education ===
Dobbs attended Spelman College where she studied home economics and considered becoming a fashion designer. Her teachers encouraged her to study music, however, and she began to study voice, graduating with a degree in Spanish and music in 1946. Following her graduation, she moved to New York City and studied with German soprano Lotte Leonard while completing a Master's degree in Spanish at Columbia University.

Dobbs won a number of scholarships, including the Marian Anderson Award in 1947, and a John Hay Whitney Fellowship. The funds from these awards enabled her to move to Europe in 1950 and pursue her studies there, notably with Pierre Bernac.

=== Performance career in Europe ===
Dobbs initially performed in Europe as a concert recitalist; however, after winning the International Music Competition in Geneva, Switzerland, in 1951, she went on to sing at the major festivals and opera houses throughout the continent. She made her professional operatic debut at the Holland Festival, as the Nightingale in Stravinsky's The Nightingale, in 1952. She made her debut at the Glyndebourne Festival, as Zerbinetta in Ariadne auf Naxos, in 1953. Her success at this festival led to a performance contract at London's Covent Garden from 1953 to 1958.

Her La Scala debut in 1953 was at the invitation of conductor Herbert von Karajan. Dobbs performed the role of Elvira in L'italiana in Algeri, which also marked the first time a black artist sang in that opera house. In a review of her performance, the British magazine Opera called her "the outstanding coloratura of her generation".

She made her debut at the Royal Opera House in London, as the Woodbird in Siegfried, in 1953. She also appeared at the Paris Opéra, the Vienna State Opera, and at the opera houses of Hamburg and Stockholm. In 1954, she sang before Queen Elizabeth II and the King and Queen of Sweden at Covent Garden Theatre and performed at the Edinburgh International Festival

In the 1960s Dobbs continued to perform in Europe, particularly in Sweden, where she lived with her husband. Her successful, high-profile European career is considered significant in setting an example to younger black female singers such as Leontyne Price, Shirley Verrett, Jessye Norman and Kathleen Battle.

=== Performance career in the United States ===
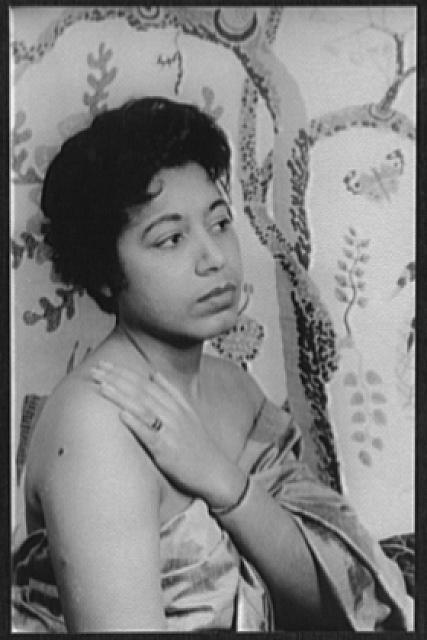
Mattiwilda Dobbs (1955) Photo by Carl Van Vechten

Her American debut was a recital with the Little Orchestra Society, in New York City, in 1954. She made her Metropolitan Opera debut, as Gilda in Rigoletto, on November 9, 1956, becoming the first African American singer to perform in a romantic role. In a review of her performance, Carl Van Vechten wrote that Dobbs' was "glorious ... a warm and brilliant coloratura, and the best Gilda in my experience." Although African-American singer Marian Anderson had performed at the Met the previous year, Dobbs was the first African-American to be offered a long-term contract by the Met. In eight seasons, she performed 29 times, including Zerbinetta in Ariadne auf Naxos, Zerlina in Don Giovanni, Olympia in The Tales of Hoffmann, Lucia in Lucia di Lammermoor, and Oscar in Un ballo in maschera. She also appeared at the San Francisco Opera in 1955, where she was the first African-American to play a lead role.

Following the example set by other African-American performers, Dobbs refused to perform for segregated audiences. She later stated that this hurt her career as she declined offers of work in the southern states. When the Atlanta Municipal Auditorium was desegregated in 1961, Dobbs was the first person to sing to an integrated audience in the city. After de-segregation, she performed in Atlanta in a series of operas produced by Blanche Thebom.

=== Retirement ===
Dobbs retired from performing in 1974, and began teaching at the University of Texas, where she was the first African-American on the faculty. She continued her teaching career as professor of voice at Howard University in Washington, D.C., before retiring to Arlington County, Virginia.

In 1989 Dobbs was elected to the board of directors of the Metropolitan Opera.

== Recordings ==
Dobbs's coloratura soprano was praised for its freshness and agility, as well as tonal beauty, and was considered an ideal voice for sound recording. However, she can be heard in relatively few recordings, as she spent her early career in Europe. When she returned to the United States in 1954 Roberta Peters had become a top soprano recording artist.

Dobbs's notable recordings include Die Entführung aus dem Serail (in English), opposite Nicolai Gedda (who was born the same day as she was, July 11, 1925), and conducted by Yehudi Menuhin, Les pêcheurs de perles conducted by René Leibowitz, and a recital of opera arias and songs, released in 1998 by Testament Records. She sang both Olympia and Antonia in a complete recording of The Tales of Hoffmann featuring Leopold Simoneau and Heinz Rehfuss, and conducted by Pierre-Michel Le Conte, which was issued in 1958 by Epic in stereo in the USA and by Concert Hall in Europe, and reissued on CD in 2008. She also recorded the title role of Zaide under Leibowitz in Paris in 1952, and excerpts from Rigoletto alongside Rolando Panerai.

== Recognition ==
In 1954, the King and Queen of Sweden awarded Dobbs the Order of the North Star.

In 1979, Dobbs received an honorary doctorate of fine arts from Spelman College.

In 1980, the Library of Congress held an exhibition on her life.

In 1983, Dobbs received the James Weldon Johnson Award in Fine Arts from the Atlanta National Association for the Advancement of Colored People (NAACP).

== Personal life ==
Martin Luther King Sr. wanted his son, Martin Luther King Jr., to marry Dobbs, as her father was an active civil rights activist and a friend of his.

Dobbs was married twice. Her first husband, Spanish journalist Luis Rodriguez, died of a liver ailment in June 1954, fourteen months after their wedding. In late 1957, she married Bengt Janzon, a Swedish newspaperman and public relations executive. Janzon died in 1997. Dobbs was the aunt of the first black Mayor of Atlanta, Maynard Jackson, and sang at his inauguration in January 1978.

Dobbs died from cancer on December 8, 2015, at her home in Atlanta at the age of 90.
