= June Dobbs Butts =

American educator and writer (1928–2019)

- Born: June Selena Dobbs; June 11, 1928 Atlanta, Georgia, USA
- Died: May 13, 2019 (aged 90) Johns Creek, Georgia, USA
- Education: Spelman College (BA, 1948); Fisk University (M); Teachers College, Columbia University (EdD)
- Children: 3
- Relatives: John Wesley Dobbs (father); Josephine Dobbs Clement (sister); Mattiwilda Dobbs (sister); Irene Dobbs Jackson (sister); Maynard Jackson (nephew)

June Selena Dobbs Butts (1928–2019) was an American educator, writer, therapist, and family counsellor. She was the first Black person trained by human sexuality researchers Masters and Johnson.

== Early life and education ==
June Selena Dobbs was born in Atlanta, Georgia on June 11, 1928, to Irene (née Thompson) and John Wesley Dobbs, an American civil and political leader. She was the youngest of the couple's six daughters, including opera singer Mattiwilda Dobbs (1925–2015), professor Irene Dobbs Jackson, and activist and civic leader Josephine Dobbs Clement (1918–1998). Dobbs was childhood friends with American civil rights activist Martin Luther King Jr.

Dobbs attended Spelman College, graduating in 1948 with a Bachelor of Arts in sociology. She later earned a master's degree from Fisk University, and a Doctorate of Education in family life education from the Teacher's College of Columbia University.

== Career ==
Butts began her academic career in 1950 as a psychology professor at Fisk University and subsequently held faculty positions at Howard University College of Medicine, Meharry Medical College, and Tennessee State University.

After moving to New York City, Butts joined the Planned Parenthood's Board of Directors, through which she met sex researchers Masters and Johnson in the 1970s. They invited her to their Reproductive Biology Research Foundation (later the Masters and Johnson Institute) in St. Louis, Missouri, where she trained as a sex therapist. She was the first Black person Masters and Johnson had trained.

Later in her career, she served as a visiting scientist at the Centers for Disease Control and Prevention (CDC) in Atlanta. She also hosted a radio call-in show in Washington.

== Writing ==
Butts authored four book chapters and numerous articles on human sexuality. Her 1977 article for Ebony magazine, "Sex Education: Who Needs It?", was the Ebony's first feature on the topic. Between 1980 and 1982, she wrote "Sexual Health", a monthly column in Essence. Her other works appeared in publications such as Jet and the American Journal of Health Studies.

== Personal life ==
Butts was the aunt of Maynard Jackson, the first African-American mayor of Atlanta and of any major city in the Southern United States.

While living in Nashville, Dobbs met Hugh Butts, a psychoanalyst. The couple married in 1953, then moved to New York City, before divorcing in the 1970s. Butts had three children, one of whom preceded her in death.

She died May 13, 2019, in Johns Creek, Georgia, shortly after having a stroke.
