= 1953 Atlanta Board of Aldermen election =

- May 13, 1953

The Democratic primary for the 1953 Atlanta Board of Aldermen election was held on May 13, 1953. It was held concurrently with the 1953 primaries for mayor and school board. All nominees won election on December 2 except for Joe Allen (2nd Ward Position 2), who was defeated by independent candidate Robert E. Lee Field. The position of Board President, an at-large elected position, was created for the ballot.

== Board President ==
- Lee Evans

== 1st Ward Position 1 ==
- Joe Salem*
- James E. "Jim" Jackson*
- Herchel "Sparky" Coile

== 1st Ward Position 2 ==
- L. O. Moseley
- Robert Dennis

== 2nd Ward Position 1 ==
- Ed A. Gilliam

== 2nd Ward Position 2 ==
- Joe Allen
- Robert E. Lee Field

== 3rd Ward Position 1 ==
- W. T. "Bill" Knight
- T. J. "Tom" Couch

== 3rd Ward Position 2 ==
- Clarence Welch
- Colie B. Whitaker

== 4th Ward Position 1 ==
- Lester Hardy*
- Roy Bell
- Douglas Wood*

== 4th Ward Position 2 ==
- Jess H. Watson
- Dean Callaway
- Charlie Leftwich

== 5th Ward Position 1 ==
- John A. White

== 5th Ward Position 2 ==
- Jimmy Walker
- Hamilton Douglas Jr*
- Jimmy Vickers*
- Lee Watson
- George H. Kasper Jr

== 6th Ward position 1 ==
- T. Wayne Blanchard

== 6th Ward Position 2 ==
- Jack Summers
- John T. Marler

== 7th Ward Position 2 ==
- Milton Farris
- E. E. "Buster" Cooper

== 8th Ward Position 2 ==
- R. M. "Bob" Clark*
- Sam Jones
- Cobb C. Torrance*
