= Irene Dobbs Jackson =

American professor of French

- Born: 1908
- Died: 1999 (aged 90–91)
- Spouse: Maynard Holbrook Jackson (m. 1933; died 1953)
- Children: 6, including Maynard Jackson

Academic background
- Education: Spelman College (1929); University of Toulouse (1958)

Irene "Renie" Dobbs Jackson (née Dobbs, 1908–1999) was an American professor of French at Spelman College and a civil rights activist who helped desegregate Atlanta's public libraries, where African American patrons were only allowed to read books in the basement.

Irene Dobbs was born in Atlanta, Georgia in 1908, to Irene (née Thompson) and John Wesley Dobbs, an American civil and political leader. She was the eldest of the couple's six daughters, including activist and civic leader Josephine Dobbs Clement (1918–1998), opera singer Mattiwilda Dobbs (1925–2015), and educator June Dobbs Butts (1928–2019).

Dobb attended Spelman College, where she studied French and graduated class valedictorian in 1929. She also studied at the University of Chicago, Middlebury College, the University of Grenoble, and the University of Toulouse. While in France, she corresponded with Martin Luther King Jr., whom she had known throughout her childhood. In 1958, she earned a doctorate from the University of Toulouse.

Dobbs married Maynard Holbrook Jackson, a pastor and missionary, in 1933. Their marriage lasted until his death from pneumonia in 1953. Like her mother, Jackson had six children, including Maynard Jackson, who became the first African-American mayor of Atlanta and any major city in the Southern United States.

Jackson taught at the historically black colleges and universities of Bishop College, North Carolina Central University, and Spelman College, the latter of which she spent nearly 50 years at.

African Americans were only allowed to use a segregated branch library. Jackson pressed for a library card at the main branch and received one. She was interviewed for the Civil Rights History Project.

Jackson died in 1999, after which the Georgia House of Representatives passed a resolution commemorating her.

In 2020, a redevelopment of the home she had with her husband was planned to provide affordable housing for Atlanta University graduate students and researchers.
