= 2018 Atlanta sanitation strike =

Labor strike in Georgia, US

- Date: August 10, 2018
- Location: Atlanta, Georgia, US
- Caused by: Disputes over labor contracts; Allegations of Federal law violations
- Methods: Walkout; Picketing
- Result: Deal reached between company and union

Parties
International Brotherhood of Teamsters: Local 728	Republic Services

The 2018 Atlanta sanitation strike was a labor strike involving approximately 120 sanitation workers employed by Republic Services in Atlanta, Georgia, United States. Represented by the International Brotherhood of Teamsters, the workers initiated the strike on August 10, 2018, in response to unresolved contract negotiations. Although the strike lasted only one day, it prompted renewed discussions, and several days later, the union and Republic Services reached an agreement on new labor contracts.

== Background ==
On August 5, 2018, 120 members of Local 728 of the International Brotherhood of Teamsters voted to authorize strike action against their employer, Republic Services. The workers involved were part of a unit that serviced several residential areas in Atlanta, as well as the Atlanta Public Schools, Emory Healthcare, Emory University, Hartsfield–Jackson Atlanta International Airport, and Piedmont Hospital. The strike organizer claimed that the members voted to strike after disputes in labor contract negotiations with Republic, saying, "The company has halted bargaining and negotiating with these workers. They refuse to reduce employees' cost of health insurance. Workers don't get paid for all the time they work." Additionally, the union alleged that Republic was guilty of violating Federal law in an incident where work was taken from full-time mechanics and leased to subcontractors. A previous strike involving workers for Republic occurred in 2013 in nearby McDonough, Georgia.

== Course of the strike ==
The strike began shortly after midnight on August 10, when the workers performed a walkout. Shortly thereafter, the strikers, many wearing yellow vests, began picketing outside Republic's Atlanta offices. The strike ended later that day at 3:30 p.m., though there are disagreements regarding how the strike ended. In a press release, Republic claimed that union officials had "directed our employees to walk out on their jobs this morning without giving our employees a chance to vote on our comprehensive proposal," and they had "accepted an immediate and unconditional offer by Teamsters 728 to return to work." However, the strike organizer claimed that the strike had ended when it was scheduled to end, with no conversation occurring between Republic and union members. Following the end of the strike, the strike organizer didn't rule out the possibility of subsequent strike action. Republic claimed that the impact of the strike on their operations were minimal, only affecting some operations in the southern part of the city.

== Aftermath ==
Following the strike, none of the striking employees faced disciplinary action from the company. Several days later, on August 27, the union and company reached an agreement on a new 5-year labor contract. While the details were not released, the deal addressed the issues that had led to the strike.

== See also ==
- 1977 Atlanta sanitation strike
