= Valerie Jackson =

American radio host, executive (born 1949)

First Lady of Atlanta
- In office 1977–1982
- Preceded by: Burnelle "Bunnie" Jackson (previous wife)
- Succeeded by: Jean Childs Young
- In office 1990–1994
- Preceded by: Jean Childs Young
- Succeeded by: Sharon Campbell

Personal details
- Born: Valerie Richardson; April 3, 1949 (age 77) Richmond, Virginia, U.S.
- Spouse: Maynard Jackson (m. 1977; died 2003)
- Occupation: President of Jackson Financial Corporation

Valerie Jackson (née Richardson; April 3, 1949) is an American radio host, philanthropist, and former advertising executive. She is the widow of former Atlanta, Georgia mayor Maynard Jackson.

== Early life ==
Jackson was born to Charles and Cora Ruth Richardson, and grew up in Richmond, Virginia. In 1963 she was one of the first black students admitted into her high school, from which she graduated in 1967. She went on to major in business management at Virginia Commonwealth University (BBA 1971), and continued her studies at the Wharton School at the University of Pennsylvania (MBA 1973).

== First Lady ==
Richardson first met Maynard Jackson, at that time the first black mayor of Atlanta, in 1976 at a party hosted by singer Roberta Flack. They were married in 1977, and she became stepmother to his three children from his previous marriage, later giving birth to two girls of their own. During her husband's tenure as mayor, she served as advisor to the city's economic development program, bringing to Atlanta such national and international events as the 1988 Democratic National Convention and the 1996 Summer Olympics.

== Career and philanthropy work ==
Jackson worked as an advertising executive for Grey Advertising and as a Regional Marketing Supervisor for Trans World Airlines in New York City. Jackson serves as President of Jackson Financial Corporation of Jackson Securities, LLC. She is Chairman of the Board and Principal of Jackmont Hospitality, Inc. She has been very involved in philanthropic work in the community, specifically in organizations helping the underprivileged. Jackson is currently Chairman of the Board of the Maynard Jackson Youth Foundation.. Jackson has served on boards, including the American Cancer Society, Habitat for Humanity and the Northwest Georgia Girl Scout Council. She is past president of the Georgia Chapter of the International Women's Forum. She is currently on the board for Alliance for a New Humanity. In 2003, Jackson started hosting a radio show on WABE, the National Public Radio station in Atlanta, called Between the Lines. On the show, she interviewed notable intellectuals in the world community who help the world through a variety of outlets, such as politics, literature and the media. Among the subjects Jackson has interviewed include Jimmy Carter, Hillary Clinton, Deepak Chopra, Sidney Poitier and Iyanla Vanzant. She now hosts the WABE radio show Valerie Jackson In Conversation that airs occasionally on Sunday evenings.

== Awards ==
Jackson was selected into the 2002 YWCA of Greater Atlanta Academy of Women Achievers. The Atlanta Business League named Jackson as one of 100 Women of Influence in Atlanta.
