= A. T. Walden =

American lawyer and civil rights leader (1885–1965)

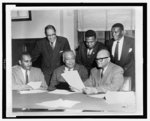
- Clarence Mitchell Jr. (seated, bottom left), William Holmes Borders (seated, bottom center), and Walden (seated, bottom right), with 3 unknown standing men, 1950.
- Born: Austen Thomas Walden; April 12, 1885; Fort Valley, Georgia
- Died: July 2, 1965 (aged 80); Atlanta
- Education: Atlanta University
- Occupation: Lawyer
- Years active: 1919–1963
- Organization: Atlanta Negro Voters League
- Political party: Republican
- Partner: Mary Ellen Denner (1918–65)
- Children: 2

Austen Thomas Walden, also known as A. T. Walden (April 12, 1885 — July 2, 1965) was an American lawyer and civil rights leader. In 1964, he was appointed by Ivan Allen Jr. as a municipal judge, the first black judge to be appointed in the state of Georgia since Reconstruction.

== Early life ==
Austen Thomas Walden was born in Fort Valley, Georgia on April 12, 1885. His parents, Jennie Tomlin and Jeff Walden, had been children when emancipated from slavery after the American Civil War.

In 1907, Walden graduated from Atlanta University, a historically black college. Because of segregation, Walden used a Georgia "out-of-state scholarship" and went to Michigan. He earned his law degree from the University of Michigan Law School in 1911.

Walden practiced law in Macon, Georgia before he joined the US Army in 1917 and fought in World War I. Walden was commissioned as a captain and served as an assistant judge-advocate. He was honorably discharged in 1919, then he moved to Atlanta to practice law.

In May 1918, Walden married Mary Ellen Denner, a public school teacher from Baltimore. They had two daughters, Jenelsie and Austella.

== Legal career ==
As an attorney, Walden represented racially persecuted middle-class African Americans.

Walden also defended in a federal legal suit, lasting six years, which gained equal pay for black public school teachers in Atlanta in 1943. In the early 1900s, the Atlanta Board of Education had raised salaries of white teachers by cutting those of blacks. Walden, alongside the NAACP, filed suit in federal district court on behalf of a black teacher.

Walden was described as having a "pragmatic civil rights" vision that was less confrontational than that of the national office of the NAACP.

Walden represented Horace Ward in 1952 in the first lawsuit in the state in federal court for a black seeking admission to the University of Georgia. Ward later served as counsel for students in a 1961 suit that successfully gained them admission to the University of Georgia. He was later appointed as a federal judge.

== Politics ==
Walden started as a Republican and served as chair of the Republican Party executive committee from Georgia's 5th congressional district. Walden also worked with the Democratic Party, and worked a bipartisanship in the Atlanta Negro Voters League, which he cofounded alongside Republican John Wesley Dobbs on July 7, 1949. Walden was also a leader of the All-Citizens Registration Committee. While leading the organizations, number of black registered voters from 1,800 in 1910 to 25,000 by 1939.

In 1962, Walden was elected to the State Democratic Committee of Georgia. In 1963, he was appointed as a Georgia delegate to the Democratic National Convention. Walden, along with Leroy Johnson, were the first blacks to participate in a Georgia Democratic Convention delegation. That year, he was appointed by President John F. Kennedy as a member of the American Battle Monuments Commission.

In 1964, Walden was appointed as the first black judge in the state after Reconstruction; Atlanta Mayor Ivan Allen Jr. appointed him as an alternate judge of the municipal courts of Atlanta.

== Death ==
Walden died in Atlanta on July 2, 1965. Mayor Ivan Allen Jr. praised Walden saying, "Much of Atlanta's outstanding pioneer progress and better race relations was due to the effective leadership of 'Colonel' Walden. His leadership laid the groundwork for much that is not an accepted fact."

== See also ==
- African Americans in Georgia
- Racial segregation in Atlanta

== Works cited ==
- Hamilton, Grace Towns (1983). "Walden, Austin T(homas)". In Logan, Rayford Whittingham; Winston, Michael R. (eds.). Dictionary of American Negro Biography (1st ed.). W. W. Norton & Co. pp. 620–621. ISBN 0393015130.
- Peterson, Paul E. (July 1985). The Politics of School Reform, 1870-1940. University of Chicago Press. ISBN 978-0-226-66295-4.
