= St. Petersburg sanitation strike of 1968 =

1968 St. Petersburg sanitation strike
- Date: May 6, 1968 – August 30, 1968
- Location: St. Petersburg, Florida
- Caused by: Company reduction of wages; Worsening working conditions
- Methods: Strikes, protest, demonstrations

Parties
Sanitation Workers	City of St. Petersburg gov.

Lead figures
	Mayor Don Jones

Number
211 workers	

The St. Petersburg sanitation strike of 1968 (May 6, 1968 – August 30, 1968) was a labor strike by city sanitation workers in St. Petersburg, Florida that lasted an estimated four months. The strike of 1968 was one of three labor strikes that took place within three years by city sanitation workers, who cited grievances of pay inequality and poor working conditions. A wage dispute over a newly implemented 48-hour work week triggered the sanitation strike which lasted 116 days. 211 sanitation workers participated in the work stoppage, 210 of whom were African-American. The racial makeup of the strikers increased tensions surrounding the work stoppage and impaired social race relations in the city.Strikers participated in nonviolent marches, economic boycotts, picketing, and human blockades which eventually turned violent with four nights of riots. During the four-month strike, sanitation crew chief Joe Savage led nearly 40 marches down to City Hall, and participated in nonviolent protests which resulted in mass arrests. The strike gained the attention of local and national civil rights advocates, designating this as a significant event in the city's history.

The strike of 1968 began approximately one month after Martin Luther King Jr.'s assassination in Memphis, Tennessee, where he was supporting a citywide labor strike by black sanitation workers (see also Memphis sanitation strike). Similarly, other sanitation worker strikes were taking place in New York City and Tampa.

== Wage dispute ==
The sanitation workers' strike of 1968 was a response to a restructuring of hours resulting in a new system of pay for the sanitation workers. This new pay plan effectively reduced weekly wages for sanitation workers from $101.40 for 6 days of work (which included time and a half for Saturday) to $73 for 5 days of work. This new plan amounted to a 15% reduction in pay per hour and a 28% reduction in pay per week. After the walkout, strikers demanded a $0.25 increase in their hourly wage before they would return to work.

== Additional disputes ==
Aside from the wage dispute, there were other elements of grievances that contributed to the strike of 1968. A change in the way trash was collected in the city reduced the amount of sanitation workers needed to perform the work. Under the old system approximately 280 men were needed, as opposed to the reduced 235 men needed under the new streamlined system. The savings from this new system of garbage collection was to be passed onto the sanitation workers, which according to the workers never materialized. Furthermore, older workers with seniority in the department feared termination over the newly implemented trash containers as they were heavier and more difficult to handle. Strikers explained that there was a long list of "broken promises" behind the strike as well as a need for respect within the sanitation department and the community.

== Background ==
=== Previous strikes ===
There had been five other sanitation worker strikes in St. Petersburg, Florida, before that of 1968.1941.1951 In 1965, a labor strike was quickly settled by St. Petersburg City Manager Lynn Andrews, who promptly granted the requested raises.

Again, in November 1966, a labor strike by sanitation workers occurred as a result of a wage dispute. Approximately 250 strikers participated in the work stoppage. Local civil rights attorneys, James Sanderlin and Frank Peterman, represented a committee of eight sanitation workers, members of the Young Men's Progressive Club, during the labor negotiations with the city. Two days into the strike, "Andrews fired 70% of the sanitation department's workforce". Andrews hired approximately 140 temporary workers to fill the vacancies in the department. Unlike the previous strike of 1964, Andrews hired out-of-town replacements, also known as "scabs" or "strikebreakers", to collect garbage during the strike. After one week, Andrews granted the wage increases. Sanitation workers would now earn a 40-hour salary larger than the 44-hour salary they were earning previously.

=== Garbage men's organization ===
In 1964, garbage man Joe Savage formed the Young Men's Progressive Club, which served as a quasi union for the sanitation workers of St. Petersburg. There were no union dues and strictly survived off donations. In an effort to avoid violence, they formed an anti-violence committee of an estimated 25 members responsible for preventing violence from breaking out during a strike. Members would typically meet twice a month at the Tabernacle Baptist Church.

== Course of the strike ==
Filmed footage
- Film of 1968 St.Pete Sanitation Workers’ Strike

=== The first six days ===
==== Day 1 ====
On Monday May 6, 1968, St. Petersburg city sanitation workers went on strike and implemented a work stoppage at the Lake Maggiore sanitation compound. Workers expressed concern over a new pay plan implemented a month prior, that failed to produce "shared savings" that were to be passed along to the workers as promised. As a result of these perceived failed promises, sanitation workers demanded a wage increase of 25-cents an hour before they would return to work. City Manager Lynn Andrews, having agreed with similar demands in the two previous strikes, asked the strikers to take the day off and come back Tuesday while claiming he was in no position to grant any wage increases.

Andrews labeled this work stoppage a "wildcat walkout" strike provoked by a "few dissident workers" at an afternoon press conference. Attorney James Sanderlin, representing the strikers, quickly asserted that all sanitation workers wanted an increase in pay.

At an emergency city council meeting later that night, Andrews warned workers who did not show up for work the next day would be fired. Andrews offered an immediate increase of 5-cents per hour, falling short of the requested increase of 25-cents. The workers decided to hold out for the remaining 20-cents.

==== Day 2 ====
Tuesday May 7, 1968, fifty-two sanitation workers were fired by Andrews for refusing to go to work, as an agreement had not yet been reached by Andrews and strike leaders during negotiations. In the meantime, garbage went uncollected throughout St. Petersburg.

==== Day 3 ====
The "special raise" offered to sanitation workers of 5-cents an hour angered other departments, as a result, Andrews agreed to increase wages for 958 city employees by the same amount the sanitation workers would receive pending a settlement. Meanwhile, garbage continued to go uncollected.

==== Day 4 ====
Thursday May 9, 1968, strike leaders, including sanitation crew chief Joe Savage, encouraged sanitation workers to return to work. That morning, over 100 sanitation workers reported to the sanitation department. 35 workers had come with the anticipation to work, while others showed up to protest. Police Sergeant Ray Stewart had also come to the sanitation compound along with other officers equipped with riot gear. At approximately 7:10 a.m., the first of five garbage trucks attempted to leave the compound under police escort, but was met with a human blockade of protesters barricading the exit. At the advice of attorney James Sanderlin and crew chief Joe Savage, the protesters allowed three trucks to exit. A fourth and fifth truck were eventually able to leave without further incident at 7:28 a.m. The five garbage trucks collected garbage from businesses, schools, and hospitals while most residential trash continued to go uncollected.

As only five city garbage trucks were collecting trash, Andrews decided to allow citizens to dump their own garbage. Large trailers were placed at local fires stations while free dumping and incineration was offered at the Toytown landfill. This temporary solution to the piling up of garbage was termed as "Do-It-Yourself" garbage collection and hauling.

Andrews announced that all men who did not work that day would be fired. Andrews reportedly fired between 150-170 strikers that morning. Later that evening, Andrews also said he would be reverting to the old collection system, where sanitation employees would be returning to a six-day, 48-hour work week.

Later that Thursday night, between 10-11 p.m., fire bombings were reported at the homes of two sanitation workers who had worked earlier that day.

==== Day 5 ====
Friday May 10, 1968, six garbage trucks were able to leave the sanitation compound. An informal city council meeting was held that night, but no resolution manifested. A "freedom march" to City Hall was organized by Ike Williams, the President of the St. Petersburg chapter of the NAACP. An estimated 75 people marched in frustration for the "jobless garbage men". Marchers chanted "We Shall Overcome" for miles to City Hall.

==== Day 6 ====
Saturday May 11, 1968, only ten garbage trucks were able to leave the sanitation compound for a city of 181,000. Rotting garbage was reportedly spilling onto the streets of St. Petersburg as the strikers had yet to come to a resolution with city officials. Only 29 sanitation workers reported for work.

While strikers continued to gather in protest at the Lake Maggiore sanitation compound every morning to watch the garbage trucks leave, negotiations had reached a stalemate, and the strike entered its second week without an agreement between strikers and City Manager Andrews. However, Andrews had publicly dismissed the strikers, indicating he would not be reopening any negotiations.

By the end of May 1968, a total of 211 of the sanitation workers had been fired for refusing to return to work until their demands were met. 210 of the 211 workers were African-American, explaining the "racial overtones" behind the entire event at the time.

=== Days forward ===
On May 23, Ike Williams encouraged a "selective buying" campaign, advocating an economic boycott of white owned businesses. Subsequently, St. Petersburg Mayor Don Jones sided with the sanitation workers.

Later in the duration of the strike, Alfred Daniel Williams King, brother of the recently murdered Martin Luther King Jr., flew to St. Petersburg to march alongside Joe Savage and other nonviolent protesters. Marchers were met with riot police and many were arrested.

While few trucks were able to leave the sanitation compound under police escort to service the city, residential pick up remained slow. Most of the uncollected garbage remained in the predominantly African-American areas of the south side of St. Petersburg.

Avenues of monetary relief were arranged to meet some financial needs of strikers, such as donations. Attorney John Due, organizer for the American Federation of State, County and Municipal Employees (AFL-CIO), presented a check to the Young Men's Progressive Club. A Garbage Men's Welfare Fund was also formed to help alleviate the burdens for the over 200 families participating in the strike.

=== Riots ===
Mounting tensions quickly turned to violence and destruction in the city after the beating of Joseph Waller (now known as Omali Yeshitela). On August 17, 1968, reports of fires and looting in the south side of St. Petersburg emerged. Nine people were injured, five were white and four were African-American. 150 policemen entered the rioting areas with orders to "shoot to kill" any looters. Damages were said to reach an estimated $150,000 by that point. There were a reported 335 fires set since the start of the sanitation strike on May 6 and the violence was not yet over. Riots would continue for the next four days. Given the unrest, Andrews considered imposing a curfew and banning liquor and gas sales in "troubled areas."

=== Settlement ===
On August 30, 1968, fired sanitation workers and City Manager Andrews came to a public agreement and brought an end to the strike. As terms of the settlement, strikers would return as new employees, losing accumulated sick pay, vacation, and seniority. Workers would return to a six-day 48-hour work week, however, if a crew was able to finish their routes early they would be given the opportunity to clock out and receive a full day's pay. On October 1, 1968, sanitation workers were given an 8-cents raise per hour, while foreman received an additional 14-cents per hour.

=== Individuals involved in bargaining ===
- Lynn Andrews, City Manager
- Dan Davidson, Assistant City Manager
- James Sanderlin, attorney for sanitation workers
- Rev. Irvin Elligan, pastor of Lakeview Presbyterian Church
- Dave Welch, co-chairman of Community Alliance
- Joe Savage, sanitation crew chief
- Henry Cathirell, sanitation worker
- Fred Winters, sanitation worker
- Willie Jones, sanitation worker
- Willie McGhee, sanitation worker

=== Organizations involved in strike ===
- National Association for the Advancement of Colored People (NAACP)
- Student Nonviolent Coordinating Committee (SNCC)
- Southern Christian Leadership Conference (SCLC)
- Congress of Racial Equality (CORE)
- Committee of Concerned Clergymen
- American Federation of State, County and Municipal Employees (AFL-CIO)
- Greater St. Petersburg Council on Human Relations
- Junta of Militant Organization (JOMO)

== Aftermath ==
While returning sanitation workers did not receive the pay increase they had hoped for, there are those who suggest this strike "brought the national Civil Rights Movement to St. Petersburg" and started the conversation for cultural and economic advancements of African-Americans in the city.

A few months following the end of the sanitation strike, C. Bette Wimbish became the first African American elected to St. Petersburg City Council.

James Sanderlin, the attorney who represented the sanitation strikers, became the first African-American Pinellas County Judge in 1972, and later was elected to the county circuit court.
