= Hurt Park (Atlanta) =

Park in downtown Atlanta, Georgia, US

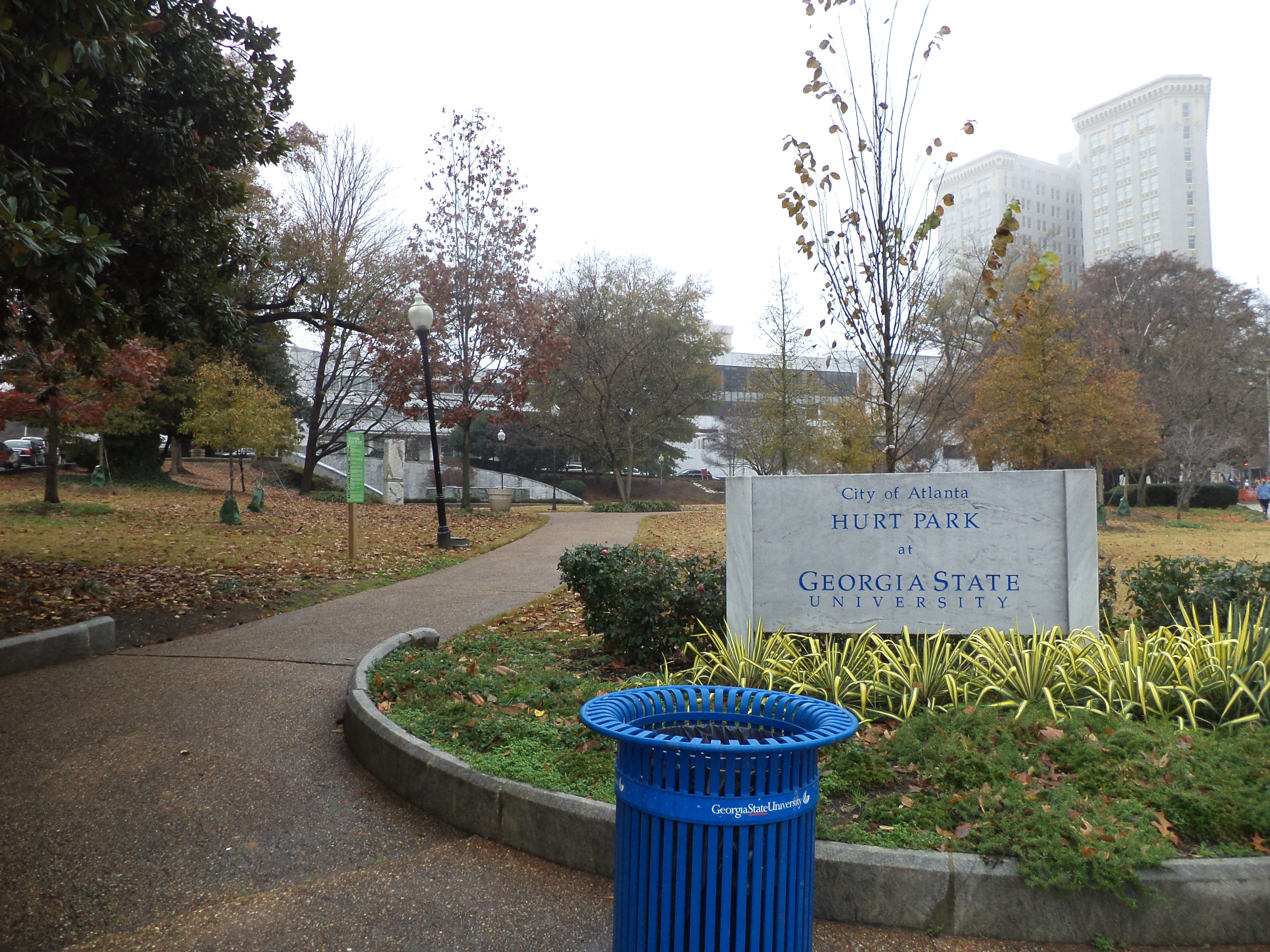
- Interactive map of Hurt Park
- Location: Atlanta, Georgia
- Coordinates: 33.754165°N 84.385582°W
- Created: 1940
- Owner: Georgia State University (GSU) and City of Atlanta
- Operator: GSU
- Public transit: Atlanta Streetcar - Hurt Park Station; MARTA - Bus 99
- Website: events.gsu.edu/hurt-park/

Hurt Park is a small park in downtown Atlanta in the triangle between Edgewood Avenue, Courtland Street, and Gilmer Street. It is named after banker, real estate, and streetcar developer Joel Hurt. When Hurt Park opened in 1940, it was the first public park in downtown Atlanta since the 1860s and represented one of the great achievements of Mayor William B. Hartsfield's first administration. The park was part of a 1937–1942 "transformation of [the city's] aging Municipal Auditorium and the surrounding area into a civic center that befitted Atlanta's rising status as a convention center". The park and its fountain were funded in part by the Woodruff Foundation and were designed by the noted landscape architect William C. Pauley. The park was one of downtown Atlanta's principal attractions during the 1940s and 1950s.

The park contains the "Fountain of Light", which used to light the water in different patterns and colors:

An electric fountain with seventy-eight bulbs from one hundred watts to fifteen hundred. It plays for twenty minutes at a time, giving numerous changes of pattern and color before it repeats its rainbow symphony. It was built at a cost of seventeen hundred dollars, and designed by Atlanta sculptor Julian Harris and presented to the city through the Emily and Ernest Woodruff Foundation.

The original fountain is still present in the park with a new and improved light show, post-renovations by Atlanta landscape architecture firm HGOR and partners. The park is included as one of the stops for the Atlanta Streetcar, which became operational around late 2014.

Services at Hurt Park station
Preceding station	MARTA	Following station
Woodruff Park One-way operation	Atlanta Streetcar	Sweet Auburn Market toward King Historic District

The park underwent extensive renovations for two years and reopened August 2022. The revitalization of the park included:

- Fountain cleaning and restoration (new mechanics and electrical systems and new fountain lighting)
- Incorporating required ADA-compliancy features
- Cleaning, repairing and repointing fountain wall and stairs
- Adding necessary safety elements: handrails on stairs and increased lighting
- Integrating concrete stage 30" above front seating and seating area improvements
- Remodeled pedestrian walkways widened for 20' x 30' stage
- Enhanced surrounding greenspaces
- Re-grading central lawn providing stage-like atmosphere and proper drainage components
- Electrical capabilities meeting WiFi data requirements

== Gallery ==
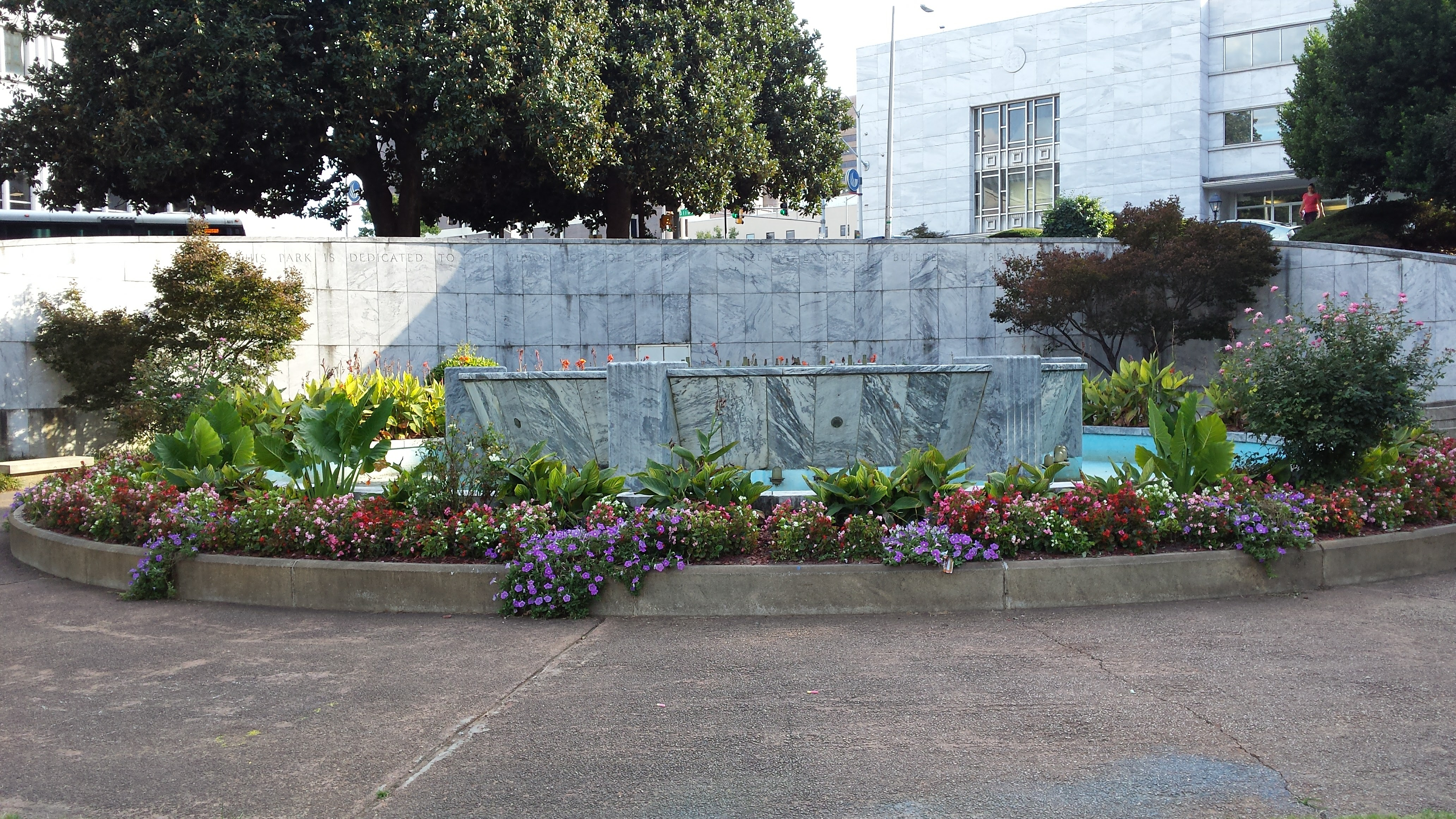
Around the fountain

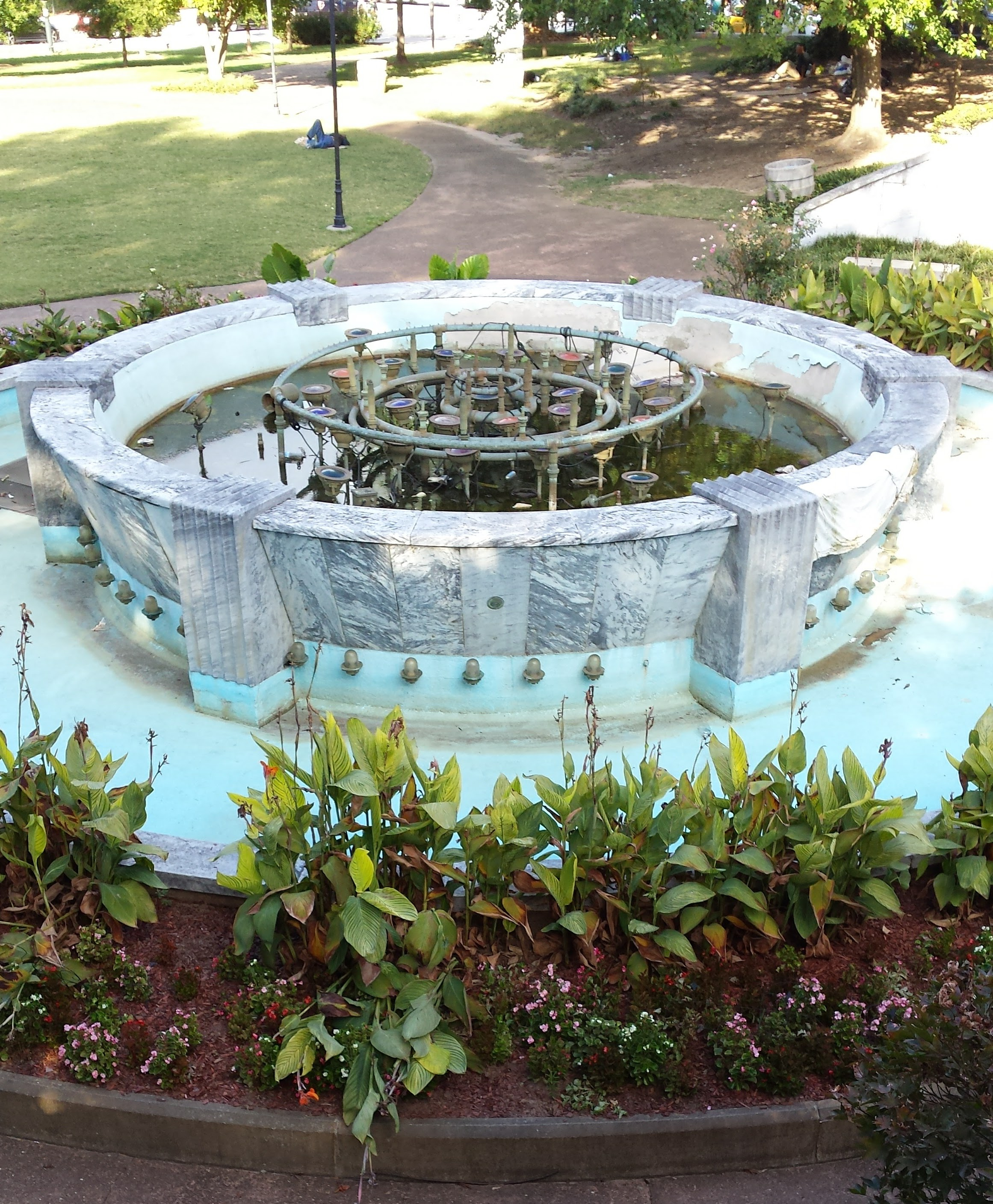
View of fountain

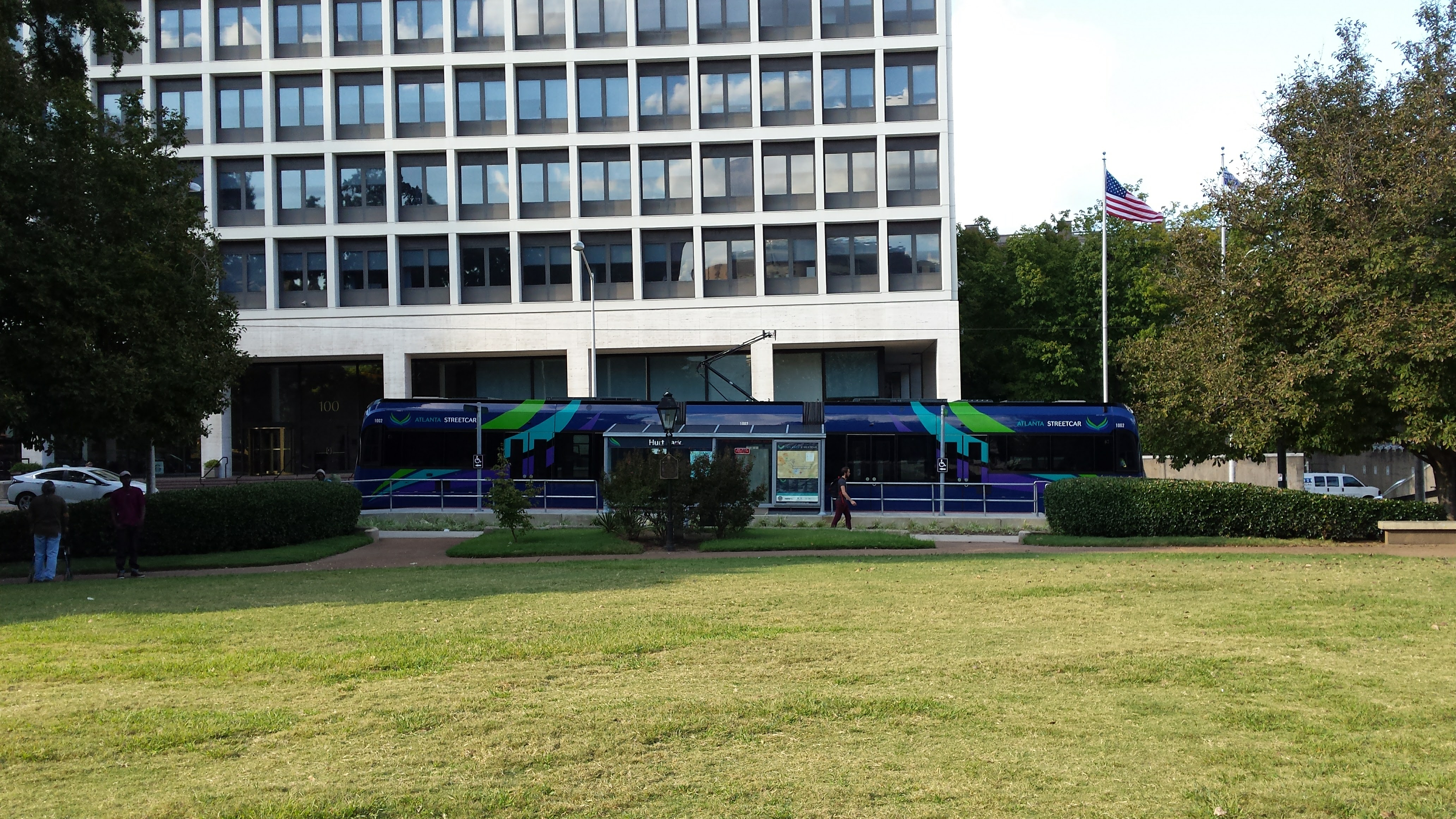
Streetcar stop

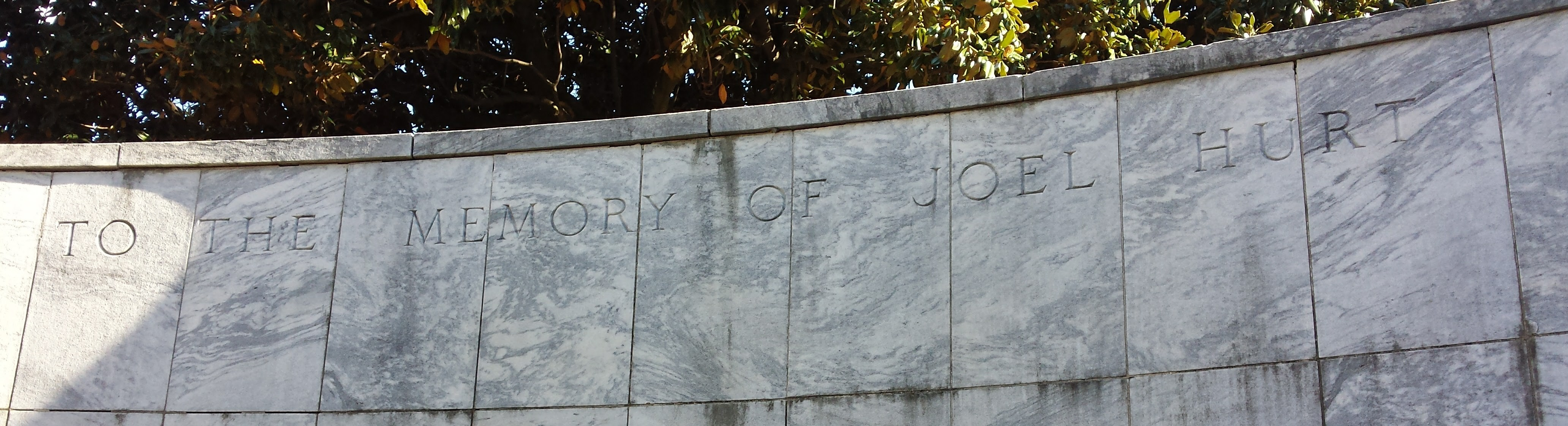
Memoriam
