= Q. V. Williamson =

American businessman and politician (1918–1985)

Member of the Atlanta Board of Aldermen Third Ward, Position 2 At-large Post 17
- In office January 7, 1966 – January 1981
- Preceded by: Jimmy Vickers
- Succeeded by: Myrtle Davis

Personal details
- Born: Quentin Virgil Williamson; December 25, 1918 Atlanta, Georgia, U.S.
- Died: August 4, 1985 (aged 66) Crawford Long Hospital; Atlanta, Georgia
- Party: Republican
- Education: Morehouse College (1940); North Carolina A&T State University
- Occupation: Businessman, politician

Q. V. Williamson (December 25, 1918 – August 4, 1985; Quentin Virgil Williamson) was an American businessman and politician. Williamson was the first black person to serve on the Atlanta Board of Aldermen since Reconstruction, elected in 1965 and taking office in 1966. He was also involved in the establishment of the Collier Heights neighborhood in Atlanta.

== Early life and education ==
Quentin Virgil Williamson was born on December 25, 1918, in Atlanta, Georgia to Noah and Bertha Williamson. He attended Booker T. Washington High School, graduated from Morehouse College with a degree in business administration in 1940, and also attended North Carolina A&T State University.

== Career ==
In 1961, Williamson became co-chair of the Atlanta Negro Voters League. He also taught at Atlanta University.

Also in 1961, Williamson ran unsuccessfully for the Atlanta Board of Aldermen, running against Third Ward incumbent Jimmy Vickers; "No one understands Negro problems like a Negro", he said, speaking to the Negro West Side Voters League before the September 1961 primary election. He was endorsed by both the Atlanta Journal and the Atlanta Constitution, but ultimately lost the election.

In 1964, he was the only black Georgia delegate to the Republican National Convention, where he fought a floor battle to nominate William Scranton.

In 1965, Williamson won election as a Republican to the Atlanta Board of Aldermen for the Third Ward, Position 2. He came first in a three-way primary against Jimmy Vickers and Stanley Herndon on September 8, 1965, and won in a runoff on September 16, 1965, once more against Vickers. Vickers and another alderman, Douglas Wood, had been found guilty of bribery and had refused to resign; Williamson was also endorsed by mayor Ivan Allen Jr. The campaign reportedly cost $20,000, with Williamson spending over $4,000 of his own money; the operation had 8 full-time employees and 50 part-time employees.

Williamson was sworn in on January 7, 1966, and appointed to seven committees: Police, Firemasters, Civil Defense, Park, Southeastern Fair, Insurance, and the Housing Authority Board. After Williamson's election, state senator Horace Ward said, "I hope that his election will serve as an example to other southern cities, and that we will see more Negroes serving in local government throughout the South."

As alderman, Williamson attended the Voter Education Project's first local government seminar at Clark College in 1967. In November 1969, four men broke into Williamson's home on Engle Road in Collier Heights; two of them tied up his family members and robbed the house, while two others abducted Williamson in an attempt to rob his office.

Julian Bond said of Williamson's influence on the council:

Williamson was the anchor of the City Council. Black council members used to meet at his home before council votes and decide the roles each member would take. Half the time the roles would fall through, but Q.V. lent an important coherency to the whole council.

After the city council was reorganized, Williamson represented At-large Post 17.

Williamson served until 1981, when he was defeated by newcomer Myrtle Davis, in what the Atlanta Journal-Constitution later described as "personif[ying] the split between old-guard and new-guard black City Council members". During the same election, civil rights activist John Lewis also ran for a different seat on the city council; another man, also named John Lewis, ran in the same race as Williamson and Davis, leading to some complaints that the "'John Lewis' factor" had caused Williamson to lose.

He was also the founder of the real estate business Q. V. Williamson & Company, served as chairman and president of the National Association of Real Estate Brokers from 1963 to 1968, and was president of the Empire Real Estate Board, which was founded in 1939 to fight housing discrimination.

Williamson testified during Armour v. Nix in the 1970s.

== Personal life ==
Williamson had a son, Quentin Jr., and two daughters, Quennetta and Maria. Williamson died on August 4, 1985, at Crawford Long Hospital in Atlanta following a respiratory illness.
