= Buddy Fowlkes =

American coach and politician (1928–2021)

D. L. "Buddy" Fowlkes
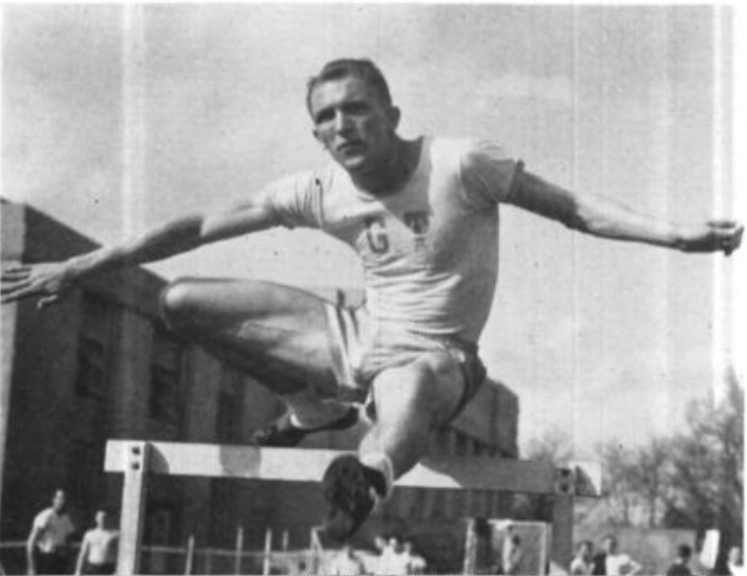
- Fowlkes at Georgia Tech in 1949

Member of the Atlanta Board of Aldermen Eighth Ward, Position 2
- In office January 2, 1962 – January 7, 1974
- Preceded by: Goodwyn "Shag" Cates
- Succeeded by: Position abolished

Member of the Atlanta City Council At-large Post 16
- In office January 7, 1974 – 1977
- Preceded by: Position established

Member of the Atlanta City Council District 7
- In office 1977 – December 14, 1993
- Preceded by: George Cotsakis
- Succeeded by: Lee Morris

Personal details
- Born: Douglas Lincoln Fowlkes; January 18, 1928 Cincinnati, Ohio
- Died: November 30, 2021 (aged 93) Atlanta, Georgia
- Spouse: Vicki Meadows (m. 1982)
- Education: Georgia Tech (IM, 1952)
- Coaching career

Playing career

Track and field
- 1949–1952: Georgia Tech

Coaching career (HC unless noted)
- 1965–1992: Georgia Tech

Accomplishments and honors

Championships
- 12× NCAA (1984, 1988, 1992, 1993); 88× ACC

Awards
- NCAA Indoor Southeast Coach of the Year (1985); NCAA Outdoor Southeast Coach of the Year (1987); ACC Outdoor Coach of the Year (1987); ACC Indoor Coach of the Year (1988); Georgia Sports Hall of Fame (1988); USTFCCCA Hall of Fame (2005); US Track and Field – Georgia Hall of Fame (2012)

D. L. "Buddy" Fowlkes (January 18, 1928 – November 30, 2021; Buddy Fowlkes) was an American track and field coach at Georgia Tech from 1965 to 1992, and a member of the Atlanta City Council from 1962 to 1993.

== Early life and education ==
Douglas Lincoln Fowlkes was born on January 18, 1928 in Cincinnati, Ohio to Claude and Faith Fowlkes. He attended North Fulton High School, where he ran track. While at North Fulton in 1945, Fowlkes was a state champion in the 220-yard dash, and also competed in the 100-yard dash and the broad jump. He was the "high-point man of the meet" with a total of 11 points.

At Georgia Tech, under coach Norris Dean, Fowlkes was the track and field team captain in 1949 (when Tech were the SEC outdoor track and field champions), and co-captain in 1948 and 1951. He competed in hurdles, sprints, broad jumps, high jumps, and relays. Fowlkes spent his off-seasons playing football, where he was a halfback.

In 1950, Fowlkes won the long jump at the AAU National Indoor Championship with a mark of 24 ft 6 3/4 in (7.48 m).

He was SEC champion in multiple events: the long jump in 1948 (21 ft 4 3/4 in (6.52 m)), 1949 (23 ft 5 in (7.13 m)), and 1951 (23 ft 11 1/2 in (7.3 m)); the 100-yard dash in 1947 (9.9 sec); the 220-yard hurdles in 1947 (24.1 sec) and 1949 (24.2 sec; the 220-yard dash in 1947 (22.2 sec).

Fowlkes won high-point honors at three separate SEC meets—a feat only ever matched by Harvey Glance—in 1947 (18 points), 1949 (14 points), and 1951 (12 points).

In 1951 at the Sugar Bowl track meet in New Orleans, Fowlkes set a record for the 100-yard dash at 9.7 seconds.

He graduated from Georgia Tech in 1952 with a degree in industrial management.

In 1960, at the age of 32, Fowlkes ran a 100-yard dash in 9.5 seconds.

== Coaching ==
Fowlkes coached men's track and field at Georgia Tech for 28 years, from 1965 to 1992. He coached the women's team from 1989 to 1992.

Notable athletes Fowlkes coached include Mike Armour, Derrick Adkins, Antonio McKay, and James Purvis.

Fowlkes also co-founded the Atlanta Track Club, and served as meet director for the Georgia AAU track and field meets in the 1960s. He chaired the first integrated Georgia Amateur Athletic Union track meet on May 25, 1963 at Grady Stadium; Fowlkes said, "We started getting some calls. I talked to some of them. We heard their side and they heard my side. A lot of them were hate calls. You would start to say something, and then they would make a derogatory comment and hang up."

After leaving Georgia Tech in 1993, Fowlkes was replaced as men's track coach by Grover Hinsdale and as women's track coach by Wendy Truvillion; both were previously assistants within the program.

Fowlkes was the ACC Coach of the Year twice, in 1987 for outdoor track, and in 1988 for indoor track.

Other awards and honors Fowlkes received as coach include: NCAA Indoor Southeast Coach of the Year (1985), NCAA Outdoor Southeast Coach of the Year (1987), Georgia Sports Hall of Fame (1988), USTFCCCA Hall of Fame (2005).

In August 2012, Fowlkes was inducted into the US Track and Field – Georgia Hall of Fame.

== Atlanta City Council ==
The first election Fowlkes ran in took place on September 13, 1961, the primary to run for alderman for the Eighth Ward, Position 2. The incumbent at the time was Goodwyn "Shag" Cates. Speaking to the North Fulton Optimist Club in July 1961, Fowlkes said, "It is the responsibility of the public to see that only men with integrity, with honesty, and with high moral character run the city government." He was endorsed by the Atlanta Constitution. The day after the primary election, the race was still uncalled, with one precinct still yet to report as Fowlkes led Cates by fewer than 500 votes. Eugene Patterson, writing for the Atlanta Constitution after the election, noted that "the Negro 'bloc vote' is usually alleged ... to be tantamount to election. Yet an incumbent alderman, Goodwyn 'Shag' Cates, took a majority of the Negro vote and lost to Buddy Fowlkes." The general election for the city, in which no one on the ballot faced opposition, took place on December 6, 1961; Fowlkes received a total of 13,718 votes.

At the age of 33, Fowlkes was the youngest person ever elected to the Board of Aldermen when he was sworn in on January 2, 1962. He recalled that then-mayor Ivan Allen Jr. "treat[ed] me like a kid. He wanted to pat me on the head like I was a little boy. I twisted his tail by sending some of his programs down the tube. He called and asked to make peace with me, and we got along okay after that."

Fowlkes represented the Eighth Ward, Position 2 from 1962 until the council was reorganized in 1974, when he represented At-large Post 16. Later, he represented District 7. In the 1969 and 1981 elections, Fowlkes was unopposed.

When mayor Maynard Jackson requested that Fowlkes redirect city money away from Bobby Jones Golf Course to poorly-funded parks in the southside instead, it sparked an eight-year-long feud between the two. Fowlkes was opposed to city ownership of Zoo Atlanta in the 1970s, calling it a "losing proposition". When the People's Fair II was held in Piedmont Park in 1971, Fowlkes said "there were so many hippies that they are taking over the park."

In 1977, as Atlanta became more liberal, Fowlkes decided to stop representing the city-wide At-large Post 16 and instead run for District 7, which was opening up as its incumbent, George Cotsakis, announced his retirement; Fowlkes's opponents were Hank Schwab and Lou Hohenstein. Fowlkes said he wanted to "steer away from tremendous social programs". Fowlkes won 49.8% of the vote in the general election, causing him to face Schwab in a runoff, which Fowlkes won.

Fowlkes was a conservative and described as having an "exacting, no-nonsense style." Sam Massell said of Fowlkes in 1982:

If Buckhead was a city, Buddy would be mayor. I always worked well with him, partly because everybody knows it doesn't pay to pick a fight with Buddy. The guy almost never accepts defeat. His power comes from the way he does research, goes after the facts and keeps working on a problem until he convinces people to help him solve it his way. Other politicians come and go, but Buddy is just too tough to fade away.

In March 1986, the Atlanta City Council passed an ordinance outlawing discrimination against gay applicants to city jobs, and that summer the Supreme Court ruled in Bowers v. Hardwick that Georgia's anti-sodomy law was not unconstitutional. That October, Fowlkes and fellow councilmember Richard Guthman sponsored a repeal of the law, which was ultimately unsuccessful by a 12–4 vote.

Fowlkes was opposed to the I-85 to I-285 extension of GA 400, which was completed in the early 1990s; "I'm encouraged," he said in 1989. "People are starting to understand that there are alternatives to the Georgia 400 extension." The same year, he was honored by Chastain Park, which declared June 10, 1989 as "Buddy Fowlkes Day".

=== Airport bribery scandal ===
In 1994, Fowlkes was indicted in a bribery scandal involving the city's airport, which he oversaw as chair of the Transportation Committee. In 1993, before Fowlkes's indictment, then-councilmember Bill Campbell said "I would be shocked if there were any truth to the allegation. I have known him to be a man of unimpeachable integrity."

Fowlkes began to announce privately that he would resign in August 1993; two people ran for election to his seat, James Garcia and Lee Morris. Morris won the election.

Fowlkes was suspended from office at noon on December 14, 1993 by a three-person state commission.

On the stand in court, Fowlkes said "I am not guilty of the charge. I have never sold my vote, nor would I consider it." After a jury trial before the United States District Court for the Northern District of Georgia, Fowlkes was found guilty on three counts of income tax fraud and one count of accepting a bribe; he was sentenced to 41 months in prison followed by three years of supervised release, and fined $25,000. The prosecutor was Sally Yates. In December 1995, Fowlkes was still free as his appeal worked its way through the courts. The conviction was upheld by the United States Court of Appeals for the Eleventh Circuit in 1996, and by January 1998, Fowlkes was incarcerated. Fowlkes's BOP Register number was 45419–019.

In 2006, it was reported that Fowlkes had nonetheless received over $200,000 in pensions since the trial and was once again living in Marco Island, Florida.

Hip-hop group Goodie Mob mentioned Fowlkes and the scandal in their song "Thought Process" on their 1995 album Soul Food. Big Gipp raps: "Makin' more deals than Buddy Fowlkes made with Hartsfield."

== Personal life ==
Fowlkes had three children with his previous wife. He married Vicki Meadows on June 12, 1982; they were together for 40 years.

Fowlkes was the official starter once for the Peachtree Road Race.

Fowlkes died on November 30, 2021 in Atlanta at the age of 93.
