= John Wesley Dobbs =

American civic and political leader (1882–1961)

- Born: March 26, 1882; Atlanta, Georgia, U.S.
- Died: August 30, 1961 (79 years old)
- Education: Morehouse College
- Occupations: Civil and political leader
- Organization: Atlanta Negro Voters League
- Known for: Involvement in the Civil Rights Movement
- Political party: Republican
- Children: 6, including Irene, Mattiwilda, Josephine, and June
- Relatives: Maynard Jackson (grandson)

John Wesley Dobbs (March 26, 1882 – August 30, 1961) was an African-American civic and political leader in Atlanta, Georgia. He was often referred to as the unofficial "mayor" of Sweet Auburn, the spine of the black community in the city.

Dobbs co-founded the Atlanta Negro Voters League with civil rights attorney A. T. Walden, leading voter registration efforts that registered 20,000 African Americans in Atlanta from 1936 to 1946. This new political power helped gain the hiring in 1948 of the first eight African-American police officers in Atlanta, the same year that the federal government began to integrate the armed services. In 1949, the city finally installed lighting along Sweet Auburn, the main retail street of the African-American community.

== Early life and education ==
Dobbs was born and grew up in Atlanta, where he attended segregated public schools. An African-American, he also had European ancestry, as his maternal grandfather was a white slave-owner who enslaved his maternal grandmother, and his paternal great-grandfather was a white slave-owner who enslaved his paternal great-grandmother. He was a voracious reader and studied at Morehouse College. He attended for two years but never graduated because he had family obligations to care for his mother. He passed a civil service exam and became a railway mail clerk for the Post Office in 1903, a position he held for 32 years.

== Family ==
Dobbs married Irene Ophelia Thompson in 1906. They had six daughters together, all of whom graduated from Spelman College. Daughters include Mattiwilda Dobbs (1925–2015), Josephine Dobbs Clement (1918–1998), Irene Dobbs Jackson, and June Dobbs Butts (1928–2019). Mattiwilda became a notable opera singer based in Europe. Josephine was elected to the city board of education in Durham, North Carolina, where she led integration and discussions about race. Irene was a professor of French at Spelman and integrated Atlanta's public libraries. June was a writer, educator, and sex therapist.

== Career ==
Dobbs became a member of the Prince Hall Masons in 1911. In 1932, he was elected Grand Master of the Prince Hall Masons (a post he held for the rest of his life). Believing that enfranchisement was the key to overcoming segregation, Dobbs started a voter registration drive in 1936 with a goal of registering 10,000 black voters in Georgia. That year, Dobbs founded the Atlanta Civic and Political League, and in 1946, along with A. T. Walden, he co-founded the Atlanta Negro Voters League. During the 1930s and 1940s, laws keeping blacks from voting, by raising barriers to voter registration or to voting in primaries, were found by the US Supreme Court to be unconstitutional. Between 1936 and 1946, 20,000 African-American voters were registered to vote in Atlanta for the first time. With the power of the black vote behind him, Dobbs convinced Atlanta mayor William B. Hartsfield to integrate Atlanta's police force in 1948; the first eight black officers were hired. The next year, 1949, the mayor ordered installation of gas lights along Auburn Avenue, the spine of the black retail district.

In 1948, when Dobbs was 66, he accompanied Ray Sprigle, a Pulitzer Prize-winning reporter for the Pittsburgh Post-Gazette, when the reporter disguised himself as a light-skinned black man and traveled for 30 days in the Deep South. They had coordinated the trip with the NAACP and kept Dobbs' role secret, as it was dangerous to challenge the Jim Crow customs and color line. Dobbs, who passed the 61-year-old newspaperman off as a cousin from Pittsburgh doing field work for the NAACP, was Sprigle's guide, host and mentor. Sprigle's 21-part syndicated newspaper series, entitled I Was a Negro in the South for 30 Days, shocked the white North and started the first debate in the national media (print and radio) about the future of legalized segregation. The series was turned into a 1949 book, In the Land of Jim Crow. Dobbs' role was not revealed to the general public until 1998 by Pittsburgh Post-Gazette staff writer Bill Steigerwald.

John Wesley Dobbs died on August 30, 1961, aged 79, the same week that the Atlanta city schools were desegregated.

== Legacy and honors ==
- Houston Street was renamed in Dobbs's honor by Maynard Jackson in 1994. Jackson, the first African-American mayor of Atlanta, was Dobbs' grandson.
- A 7 foot high face mask of Dobbs entitled "Through His Eyes" by sculptor Ralph Helmick was erected in 1996 along Auburn Avenue.
- Dobbs Elementary School in the Atlanta Public Schools is named for him.
