= Lee Evans (Georgia politician) =

F. Lee Evans (c.1905 – May 8, 1981) was an American lawyer and politician who served as President of the Atlanta Board of Aldermen (now the Atlanta City Council) from 1954 to 1962. Evans had previously been elected as Alderman for the Fourth Ward from 1942 to 1954. He was the first directly elected President of the Board. After he used racially-charged remarks to oppose a public housing project, Evans was defeated for re-election by Sam Massell in 1961.

Evans was born in Turner, Arkansas. He died on May 8, 1981, at the age of 76.
