= Atlanta Negro Voters League =

Bipartisan government Black suffrage organization

- Abbreviation: ANVL
- Formation: July 7, 1949
- Dissolved: c. 1960s
- Type: Non-governmental
- Legal status: Organization
- Location: Atlanta, Georgia, US
- Founders: A. T. Walden; John Wesley Dobbs
- Co-chairs: John H. Calhoun; Q. V. Williamson
- Affiliations: NAACP; National Urban League

The Atlanta Negro Voters League (ANVL) was an American bipartisan non-governmental organization. The organization was formed in 1949 by Republican A. T. Walden, and Democrat John Wesley Dobbs. The organization was created after the lynching of Robert Mallard. The organization’s goal was to increase the strength of the Black vote; they did this by performing sit-ins on historically Black colleges and universities.

== History ==
The organization was formed on July 7, 1949 in Atlanta, Georgia by Democratic lawyer and leader of the NAACP's Atlanta branch, A. T. Walden, and Republican leader of the Prince Hall Masons of Georgia and the Fulton County Republican Club John Wesley Dobbs. In its later years, the three founders were replaced by co-chairs John H. Calhoun, and Q. V. Williamson. Most of the founders were members of the middle class. The organization’s goal was to strengthen the Black vote. They did this by preventing the splitting of Black votes. The group was formed after members of the Ku Klux Klan lynched Robert Mallard, which happened because of Mallard's vote in the 1948 Georgia gubernatorial special election. The organization had affiliations with the NAACP and the National Urban League.

The organization had annual meetings at the Big Bethel AME Church. These meetings were held to speak about civil rights in Atlanta. They were also responsible for multiple Atlanta sit-ins, mainly ones in historically Black colleges and universities.

The group was often criticized for catering to wealthier Black people who lived in Sweet Auburn. Instead of allocating more funds to building public housing, they put their funds towards making golf courses and suburbs for middle class African Americans.

== See also ==
- African Americans in Georgia
- Black Voters Matter
- Racial segregation in Atlanta
