= Maynard Jackson =

American politician and attorney (1938–2003)

Maynard Jackson Jr.

54th and 56th Mayor of Atlanta
- In office 1974–1982
- Preceded by: Sam Massell
- Succeeded by: Andrew Young
- In office 1990–1994
- Preceded by: Andrew Young
- Succeeded by: Bill Campbell

Personal details
- Born: Maynard Holbrook Jackson Jr. March 23, 1938 Dallas, Texas, U.S.
- Died: June 23, 2003 (aged 65) Arlington, Virginia, U.S.
- Resting place: Oakland Cemetery
- Party: Democratic
- Spouse(s): Burnella "Bunnie" Hayes (m. 1965, divorced) Valerie Richardson (m. 1977)
- Parent: Maynard Holbrook Jackson (father) Irene Dobbs Jackson (mother)
- Relatives: John Wesley Dobbs (grandfather)
- Education: Morehouse College; North Carolina Central University
- Profession: Attorney; Politician

Maynard Holbrook Jackson Jr. (March 23, 1938 – June 23, 2003) was an American attorney and politician who served as the 54th mayor of Atlanta, Georgia, from 1974 to 1982, and again as the city's 56th mayor from 1990 to 1994. A member of the Democratic Party, he was the first Black American mayor of Atlanta and of any major city in the South; Jackson's three terms made him the second longest-serving mayor in the city's history, after six-term mayor William B. Hartsfield.

Jackson is notable also for public works projects, primarily the new Maynard H. Jackson International terminal at the Atlanta airport, and for greatly increasing minority business participation in the city. After his death, the William B. Hartsfield Atlanta International Airport was renamed Hartsfield–Jackson Atlanta International Airport to honor his service to the expansion of the airport, the city, and its people.

== Family history, background and personal life ==
Maynard Jackson was born into a family that valued education and political activism. His maternal grandfather was civil rights leader John Wesley Dobbs, who worked to successfully overturn the white primary in Georgia. Jackson also gained the hiring of African-American police officers in Atlanta and lighting of Auburn Street, the main retail street of the African-American community. Jackson's mother Irene Dobbs Jackson was one of six daughters; all graduated from Spelman College, encouraged by their parents. Irene earned a doctorate in France and became a professor of French at the college.

Jackson's father, Maynard Sr., was a Baptist minister from New Orleans. He became active in civil rights in Dallas, Texas, where he had grown up after his family moved. Jackson's grandfather, Alexander Stephens Jackson, had been a Baptist minister and educator in Louisiana and Texas. The young Jackson's father died when he was 15, and his grandfather Dobbs became even more influential in his life.

Jackson attended David T. Howard High School in Atlanta and Morehouse College, a historically black college for men in Atlanta, graduating in 1956 at age 18. He sang in the Morehouse College Glee Club. After attending the Boston University Law School for a short time, Jackson held several jobs, including selling encyclopedias. He returned to graduate studies, attending the North Carolina Central University Law School. Jackson graduated with a law degree in 1964. He was a member of Alpha Phi Alpha fraternity.

In 1965, Jackson married Burnella "Bunnie" Hayes. They had three children, Elizabeth, Brooke, and Maynard III. Prior to their divorce, Bunnie Jackson founded First Class, Inc. Bunnie was the first African-American woman to own a public relations and marketing firm in Atlanta.

Jackson married Valerie Richardson in 1977, to whom he was married until his death. They had two daughters, Valerie and Alexandra. Valerie hosts Between the Lines each weekend on the WABE-FM radio station, the Atlanta Public Broadcasting station.

== Early career ==
Jackson worked as a lawyer for the National Labor Relations Board and a legal services firm. He joined the Democratic Party.

== Political career ==
In 1968, when Jackson was 30 years old, he decided to run for the US Senate against incumbent Herman Talmadge. Jackson's campaign was underfunded, and he lost. However, Jackson won in Atlanta, gaining prominence in the city, which had a substantial black minority. The following year, he built on his strength, gaining election as vice mayor, who was presiding officer of the board of aldermen. At that time, Atlanta modified its city charter, strengthening the position of mayor and renaming the vice mayor as president of the city council (aldermen were now city council members).

In 1970, Jackson became Atlanta's first black Vice-Mayor, his first elected position which he held for four years. Later that year, Jackson supported sanitation workers in the city who had gone on strike, with his support contributing to their receiving a higher wage.

In 1973, Jackson was elected with 60 percent of the vote as the first African-American mayor of Atlanta and any major southern city; he was supported by a coalition of white liberals/moderates and African Americans. At age 35, he unseated incumbent Sam Massell.

During his first term, Jackson worked to improve race relations in and around Atlanta after the polarization caused by the election campaign. As mayor, he led the beginnings and much of the progress on several huge public-works projects for the city and region. Affirmative action programs helped minority and women-owned businesses to participate. Jackson helped arrange for the upgrade of the then-William B. Hartsfield Atlanta International Airport's huge terminal (now Domestic Terminal) to modern standards. He strongly opposed the construction of freeways through in-town neighborhoods, knowing that such actions destroyed thriving communities. In 1977, Jackson fired over 900 sanitation workers during the 1977 Atlanta Sanitation Strike. Following this act of strikebreaking, many of the workers returned to work by the end of the year.

Jackson was mayor through the period when the separate Metropolitan Atlanta Rapid Transit Authority (MARTA) obtained a large amount of federal funding for a rapid-transit rail-line system, when construction began, and when MARTA began its first rail transit service in Atlanta and in DeKalb County in 1979 and during its continual expansion thereafter. As mayor, Jackson celebrated in September 1990 when Atlanta was selected as the host city for the 1996 Summer Olympic Games.He also accepted the Olympic flag at the 1992 closing ceremonies in Barcelona, Spain. Jackson oversaw the completion of many planned public works projects, such as improvements to freeways and parks, and the completion of Freedom Parkway, which were expedited from 1990 to 1996 in preparation for the Olympic Games that began in August 1996.

During Jackson's second term as mayor, the Atlanta Child Murders were ongoing between 1979 and 1981. He supported the Atlanta Police and other police forces in the area but also worked to calm public tensions aroused by the serial killings of African-American children. The accused killer, Wayne Williams, was caught in 1981. Williams was convicted to serve two consecutive life sentences for the murder of two adult males, but he was never charged with or tried for the murder of any of the child victims. Williams is currently being held in Telfair State Prison.

In 1974, Jackson received the Samuel S. Beard Award for Greatest Public Service by an Individual 35 Years or Under, an award given out annually by Jefferson Awards.

== Controversy ==
Jackson heightened racial tensions in May 1974 when he attempted to fire the incumbent white police chief, John Inman. Jackson believed the change was needed to grapple with Atlanta's growing crime problem and charges by the black community of police racial insensitivity toward African Americans.

In August 1974, Mayor Jackson appointed A. Reginald Eaves, an activist and personal friend, as Public Safety Commissioner. Eaves was criticized for lacking police experience. He generated controversy by appointing an ex-convict as his personal secretary and for what was considered as affirmative action in the police department, which some described as "reverse discrimination."

Jackson fired Eaves after revelation of a police exam cheating scandal. Eaves was later convicted by a federal jury of extortion in 1988 after selling his vote on two rezonings.

In 1991, Jackson awarded transgender supermodel Caroline Cossey (known under the stage name "Tula") honorary citizenship to Atlanta, though he later rescinded it after he learned that she was transgender, saying “I wouldn’t have given it to somebody whose claim to fame was being transsexual” despite Cossey having a career for many years before her gender reassignment was public knowledge. Cossey stated that she felt insulted by his decision.

== Atlanta's crime ==
In addition to the 1979–1981 Atlanta Child Murders mentioned above, residents were concerned about a rising crime rate during Mayor Jackson's tenure. In 1979, with a soaring murder rate and nationwide publicity about crime there, Georgia Governor George Busbee, acting on a request from Mayor Maynard Jackson, called in Georgia State Patrol troopers to help patrol the downtown. The business community accused Mayor Jackson and Police Chief George Napper of dismissing public concerns about crime. Atlanta had the highest murder rate and the highest overall crime rate of any city, and the numbers were rapidly climbing higher, with a 69% increase in homicides between 1978 and 1979 alone. Much of it was considered to be driven by drug wars.

== Service to the Democratic National Committee ==
After leaving office as mayor, Jackson continued to be active with the Democratic Party. In 2001, he unsuccessfully sought the post as the Democratic National Committee chairman, losing to the fund-raiser Terry McAuliffe, who had the backing of former president Bill Clinton and First Lady Hillary Clinton. Jackson was backed by presidential candidate Bill Bradley, among others.

Jackson was appointed as the National Development Chairman of the Democratic National Committee and was the first Chairman of the DNC Voting Rights Institute. In 2002, he founded the American Voters League, a non-profit and non-partisan effort to increase national voter participation. Jackson appeared briefly in the 2001 documentary Startup.com.

== Legacy and honors ==
Towards the end of his second mayoralty, a 1993 survey of historians, political scientists and urban experts conducted by Melvin G. Holli of the University of Illinois at Chicago ranked Jackson as the twenty-fourth-best American big-city mayor to have served between the years 1820 and 1993.

- In 2008, the Southside Comprehensive High School was renamed the Maynard H. Jackson High School.
- In 2003, Hartsfield Atlanta International Airport had Jackson's name added to it, and in 2012, the airport's new international terminal was named for him.
- In 2015, a documentary film about his life and work, entitled Maynard, was in preparation, directed by Samuel D. Pollard. It was released in 2017, and has been featured at several film festivals around the United States since then. The Maynard documentary was officially selected by DOC NYC to premiere at their film festival on November 16, 2017.

== Death ==
On June 23, 2003, Jackson died at age 65 of cardiac arrest at a hospital in Arlington, Virginia after suffering a heart attack at Ronald Reagan Washington National Airport. His remains are buried at the Oakland Cemetery in Atlanta.

Political offices
| Preceded by Sam Massell | Mayor of Atlanta; 1974–1982 | Succeeded by Andrew Young |
| Preceded by Andrew Young | Mayor of Atlanta; 1990–1994 | Succeeded by Bill Campbell |
