= Sam Massell =

American politician (1927–2022)

53rd Mayor of Atlanta
- In office 1970–1974
- Preceded by: Ivan Allen Jr.
- Succeeded by: Maynard Jackson

45th President of the National League of Cities
- In office 1973
- Preceded by: Richard Lugar
- Succeeded by: Roman Gribbs

Personal details
- Born: August 26, 1927 Atlanta, Georgia, U.S.
- Died: March 13, 2022 (aged 94)
- Party: Democratic
- Spouses: Doris Middlebrooks (m. 1952; died 2015) Sandra Gordy (m. 2016)
- Education: Atlanta Law School (LL.B.); Atlanta Division of the University of Georgia (B.S.)
- Occupation: Real estate businessman

Military service
- Allegiance: United States
- Branch/service: United States Air Force

Samuel Alan Massell Jr. (August 26, 1927 – March 13, 2022) was an American businessman and politician who served from 1970 to 1974 as the 52nd mayor of Atlanta, Georgia. He was the first Jewish mayor in the city's history and the most recent non-black mayor of Atlanta.

== Early life and education ==
Massell was born to Samuel A. Massell (1892–1961) and Florence Rubin (1901–1977) in 1927. He was known as "Buddy" during his childhood and high school years. He graduated from Druid Hills High School at age 16 and enrolled at the University of Georgia in Athens, where he was a member of the Phi Kappa Literary Society. He was also president of Phi Epsilon Pi (which later merged with Zeta Beta Tau) fraternity.

Massell transferred to Emory University before being drafted into the United States Army Air Force in 1946. Later, he returned to the University of Georgia and took night classes and earned his bachelor's degree in commercial science from Atlanta Division of the University of Georgia in 1951. He received an LL.B. degree in 1949 from Atlanta Law School.

== Business career ==
A lifelong Atlanta resident, Massell has had successful careers in real estate brokerage, elected office, tourism, and association management.

For twenty years, Massell was a realtor, having become vice president of the Allan-Grayson Realty Company, then one of the largest commercial brokerage firms in Atlanta. During that time, he was elected a charter member of the "Million Dollar Club" of the Atlanta Real Estate Board. He was further honored on three occasions by the Georgia Association of Real Estate Boards for the "Outstanding Transaction of the Year".

== Political career ==
While in real estate, Massell also became active in a wide range of civic work, which eventually led to the political arena. He served twenty-two years in elected office, first as a city councilman in the town of Mountain Park, where he owned a lakehouse. He then went on to serve on the Atlanta City Executive Committee and then ran (in 1961 and 1965) to serve eight years as President of Atlanta's Board of Aldermen (now the Atlanta City Council). He ran for Mayor of Atlanta in 1969 and won the race in a runoff. In 1972, was also the president of the 15,000-member National League of Cities. In addition, he served a four-year term on the board of the Metropolitan Atlanta Rapid Transit Authority. He was a board member of the Atlanta Committee for the Olympic Games.

Among other achievements, his mayoral administration is credited with having established the Metropolitan Atlanta Rapid Transit Authority, the Omni Coliseum (the first enclosed arena in Atlanta), and Woodruff Park in Central City, all without higher ad valorem taxes. He also pioneered minority opportunities in city government, appointing Panke Bradley as the first woman to the Atlanta City Council and the first African Americans as municipal department heads. Conversely, Massell is also known to have used blatant anti-black rhetoric in his re-election bid for mayor in 1973 against the city's first black mayoral candidate, Maynard Jackson. As a result, many progressive and college-educated whites in the city (including Atlanta's largest daily newspaper) publicly endorsed Jackson, leading to Massell's defeat.

== Later career ==
After leaving full-time public service, Massell entered the tourism business in Buckhead in the Atlanta metro area. For 13 years, Massell operated in Buckhead under the name "Your Travel Agent Sam Massell". He was a Certified Travel Counselor and a former president of the Travel Industry Association of Georgia.

Massell later managed a nonprofit civic organization as the founding president of the Buckhead Coalition, an association of business executives on the north side of Atlanta. In early 2020, Massell announced his plans to retire.

== Honors ==
In 1971, he received an honorary degree in Doctor of Laws from Oglethorpe University. In addition, he is in the Atlanta Convention and Visitors Bureau "Hospitality Hall of Fame"; King Center for Nonviolent Social Change "Walk of Fame"; Georgia State University Robinson College "Business Hall of Fame"; Georgia Trend Magazine "Most Influential Georgians Hall of Fame"; and Georgia Municipal Association "Government Hall of Fame".

Charles McNair wrote a 304-page biography of Massell entitled Play It Again, Sam: The Notable Life of Sam Massell, Atlanta’s First Minority Mayor, which was published by Mercer University Press on September 1, 2017.

== Personal life ==
He was married to Doris Middlebrooks from 1952 until she died in 2015. In 2016, the 89-year-old Massell wed his long-time friend Sandra Gordy in a private ceremony at their home in Buckhead.

He died on March 13, 2022, at the age of 94.

== Sources ==
- McNair, Charles. 2017. Play it Again Sam: The Notable Life of Atlanta's First Minority Mayor. Macon, GA: Mercer University Press.

Preceded by Ivan Allen Jr.	Mayor of Atlanta; January 1970 – January 1974	Succeeded by Maynard Jackson
