= U-Rescue Villa =

Coordinates: 33.771°N 84.375°W

U-Rescue Villa was an Atlanta Housing Authority public housing complex built in 1970 and torn down in May 2008. It was located at 355 North Avenue N.E., between Central Park and Parkway, in the Old Fourth Ward neighborhood. It had 70 units and 271 residents at the time of demolition.

The name came from a neighborhood organization U.-Rescue which stood for "Urban renewal Emergency: Stop, Consider, Understand, Evaluate". U-Rescue fought for the interests of local residents in the face of massive urban renewal plans after 1965. Slums areas such as Buttermilk Bottom were razed to make way for urban renewal projects such as Bedford Pine, but in reality very little low income housing was ever built to replace the housing units that were razed. U-Rescue and other organizations fought to build more low-income housing and U-Rescue Villa was a result of those efforts.

The Cosby Spear high-rise is located in the middle of what was the U-Rescue Villa complex and remains standing, housing senior citizens.
