= U-Rescue =

U-Rescue was a neighborhood organization in Atlanta which stood for "Urban Renewal Emergency: Stop, Consider, Understand, Evaluate". U-Rescue fought for the interests of local residents in the face of massive urban renewal plans after 1965. Slums areas such as Buttermilk Bottom were razed to make way for urban renewal projects such as Bedford Pine, but in reality very little low income housing was ever built to replace the housing units that were razed. U-Rescue and other organizations fought to build more low-income housing and U-Rescue Villa was a result of those efforts.

== See also ==
- U-Rescue Villa
