= Hurt Building =

- U.S. National Register of Historic Places
- Atlanta Landmark Building
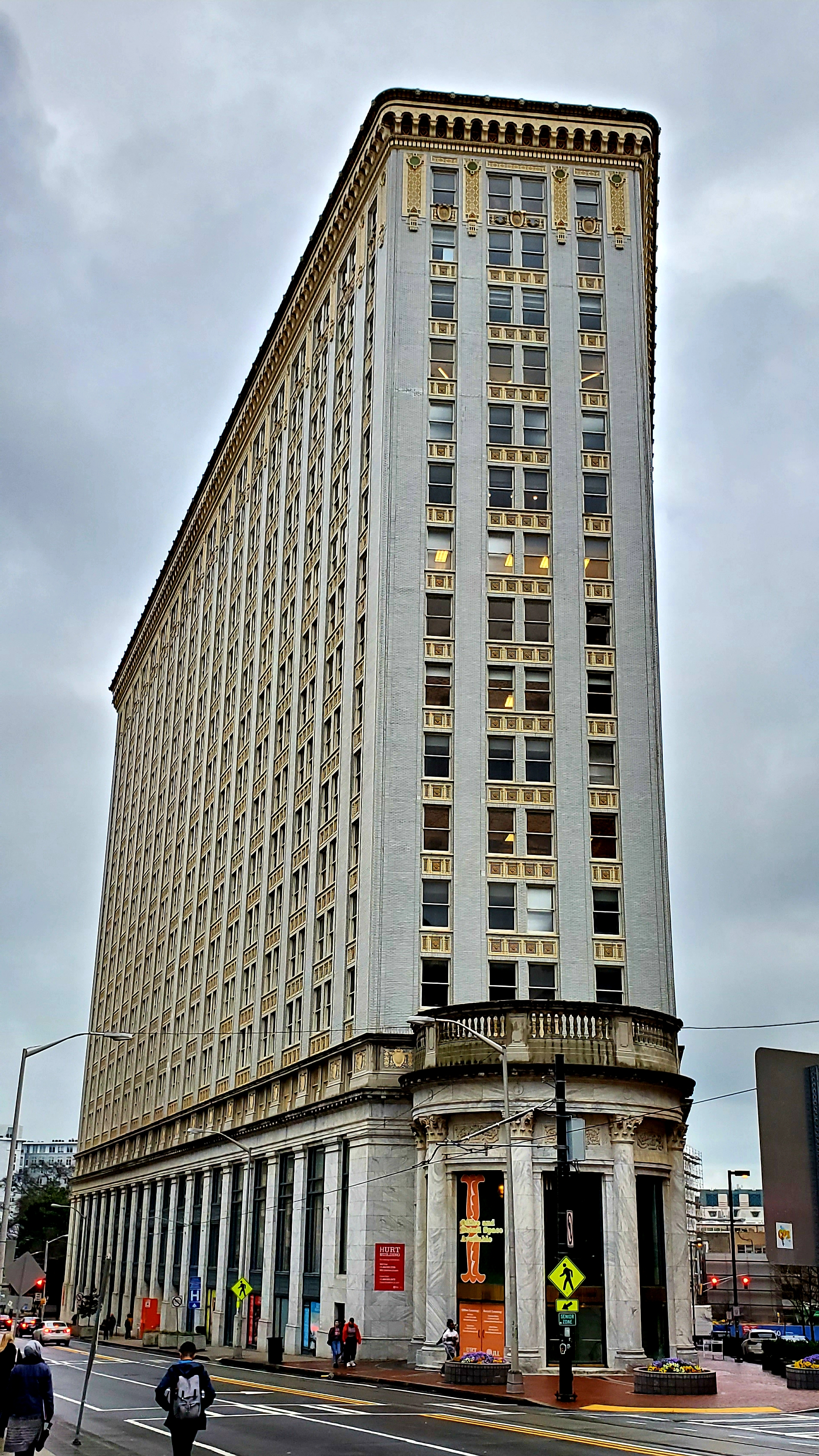
- Hurt Building in 2020

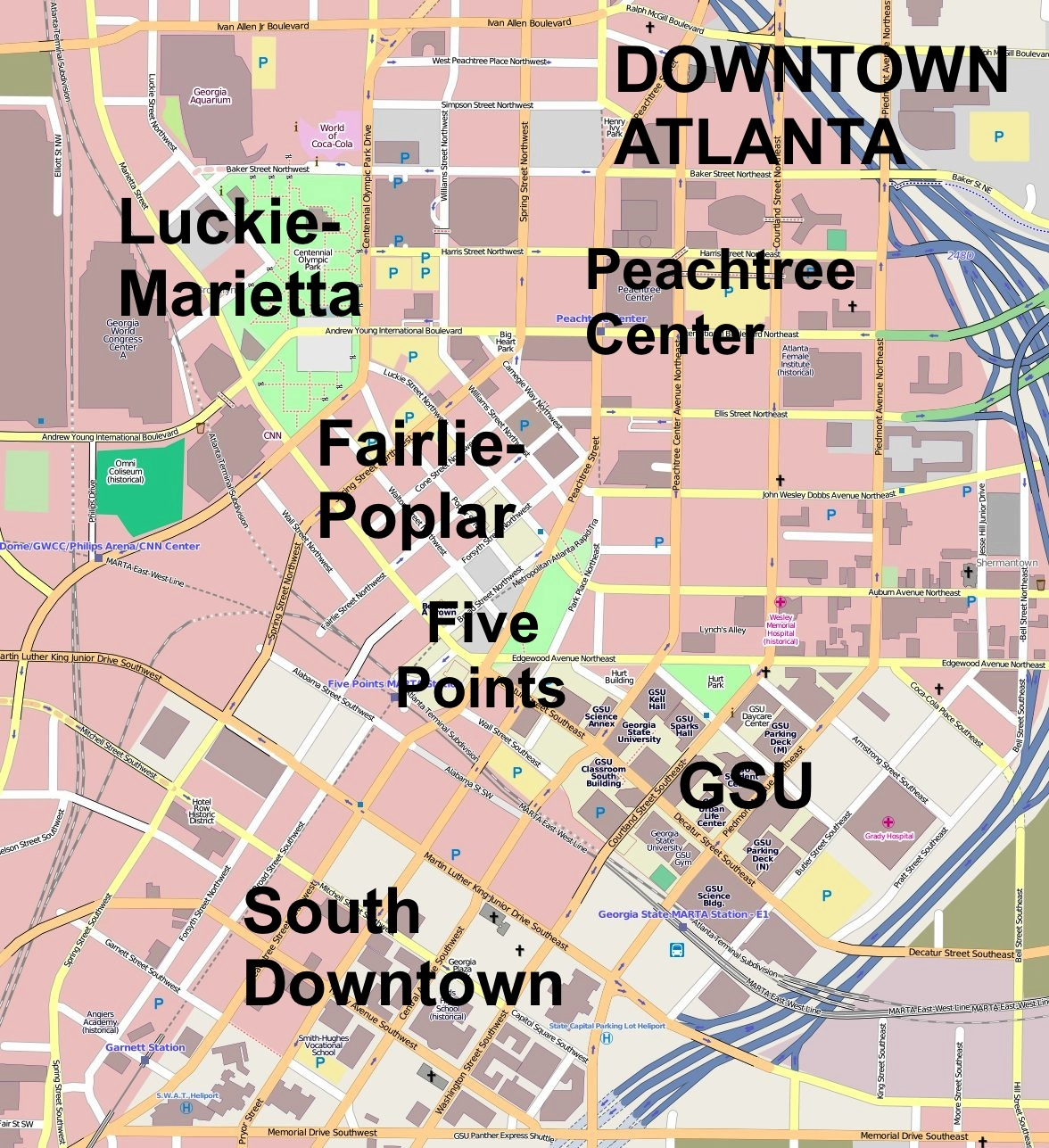
- Location within Downtown Atlanta Location within Atlanta Location within Georgia Location within the United States
- Location: Atlanta, Georgia
- Coordinates: 33°45′15″N 84°23′14″W
- Built: 1913-1926
- Architect: J.E.R. Carpenter
- Architectural style: Skyscraper
- NRHP reference No.: 77000431

Significant dates
- Added to NRHP: April 13, 1977
- Designated ALB: October 23, 1989

The Hurt Building is an 18-story building located at 50 Hurt Plaza in Atlanta, Georgia with a unique triangular shape. One of the nation's earliest skyscrapers, the Hurt Building was built between 1913 and 1926, and was the initial home for the Federal Reserve Bank of Atlanta. It was renovated in 1985. It was added to the National Register of Historic Places in 1977.

== History ==
=== Concept ===
The eponymous building was conceived and developed by Joel Hurt, a prominent Atlanta businessman and prolific developer. Hurt had already built the city's first skyscraper, the original Equitable Building, nearly two decades before. He was part owner of Atlanta and Edgewood Street Railroad, the city's first electric streetcar, which connected the city center to the Inman Park residential area he developed. He also co-founded the Trust Company of Georgia (an early predecessor of what is now Suntrust) and was its president for nine years starting in 1895. Moreover, Hurt married into the Woodruff family, which would eventually control both the Trust Company of Georgia and The Coca-Cola Company.

Hurt made preliminary drawings for several years before choosing well-known New York architect J.E.R. Carpenter to complete the design. Though Carpenter was based in New York by then, he was born and raised outside of Nashville, Tennessee.

It was the 17th largest office building in the world at the time of its construction, it is considered a good example of the skyscraper developed by the famed Louis Sullivan and the Chicago School style.

=== Construction and design ===
The Hurt Building was constructed during a turbulent economic period between 1913 and 1926 that was marred by four recessions as well as World War I, which delayed the construction of the wings and light court of the building until 1924. Nonetheless, the bulk of the building was completed in 1913, with a courtyard and the entry rotunda pushing the final completion to 1926.

With restrained ornamentation, it occupies a middle ground between Beaux Arts classicism and the emerging modernist aesthetic. The 17-floor building is characterized by a unique triangular shape, most closely associated with the Flatiron Building in New York City, which was necessitated by its triangular site.

The building is constructed of steel frame and reinforced concrete. The building envelope is uninterrupted marble and glazed brick piers with ornamental terra cotta spandrels terminating in a heavy decorative cornice exemplifying the craftsmanship of the early 1900s. It is composed of straight fronts, a flat roof, level skyline, subordination of ornament, a regular pattern of fenestration, and cornices of moderate projection. The lower four floors were designed to fill the building's footprint with the exception of the apex of the building, which faces Five Points, and was cut back 30 feet to allow a greater window area and a more majestic view of the building. The upper 13 floors above lower base is arranged in a V-shape, with the two wings extend from the western apex of the property along both Exchange Place and Edgewood Avenue leaving an open light court between the wings opening toward Ivy Street.

Another key feature is three-story domed rotunda. At its center, the original 1913 chandelier highlights a ceiling, decorated with gold leaf panels and sunburst motifs. This artistry is reflected in a circular marble staircase which leads down to the Venetian Room event space.

The first tenant occupied the Hurt Building in October 1913. Among the first tenants was the newly created Federal Reserve Bank of Atlanta, which paid rent of $6,500 for the first year, $8,000 for the second, and $9,000 for the third. until its own building was completed in 1918 at 104 Marietta Street.

Six decades later, beginning in 1983, the Hurt Building was completely renovated, inside and out, reopening in 1985.

The Hurt Building at 96 years old became the first commercial office building in the state of Georgia (and 6th oldest in the nation) to earn LEED-EBOM Gold Certification as well as the first in Georgia to be awarded the BOMA 360 designation, both in 2009.

== In popular culture ==
The NBC legal drama Matlock, starring Andy Griffith, used exterior shots of the Hurt Building to represent the office of the fictional Ben Matlock. In the 2016 crime thriller Triple 9, the Hurt Building was the site of the bank robbery committed at the start of the film.

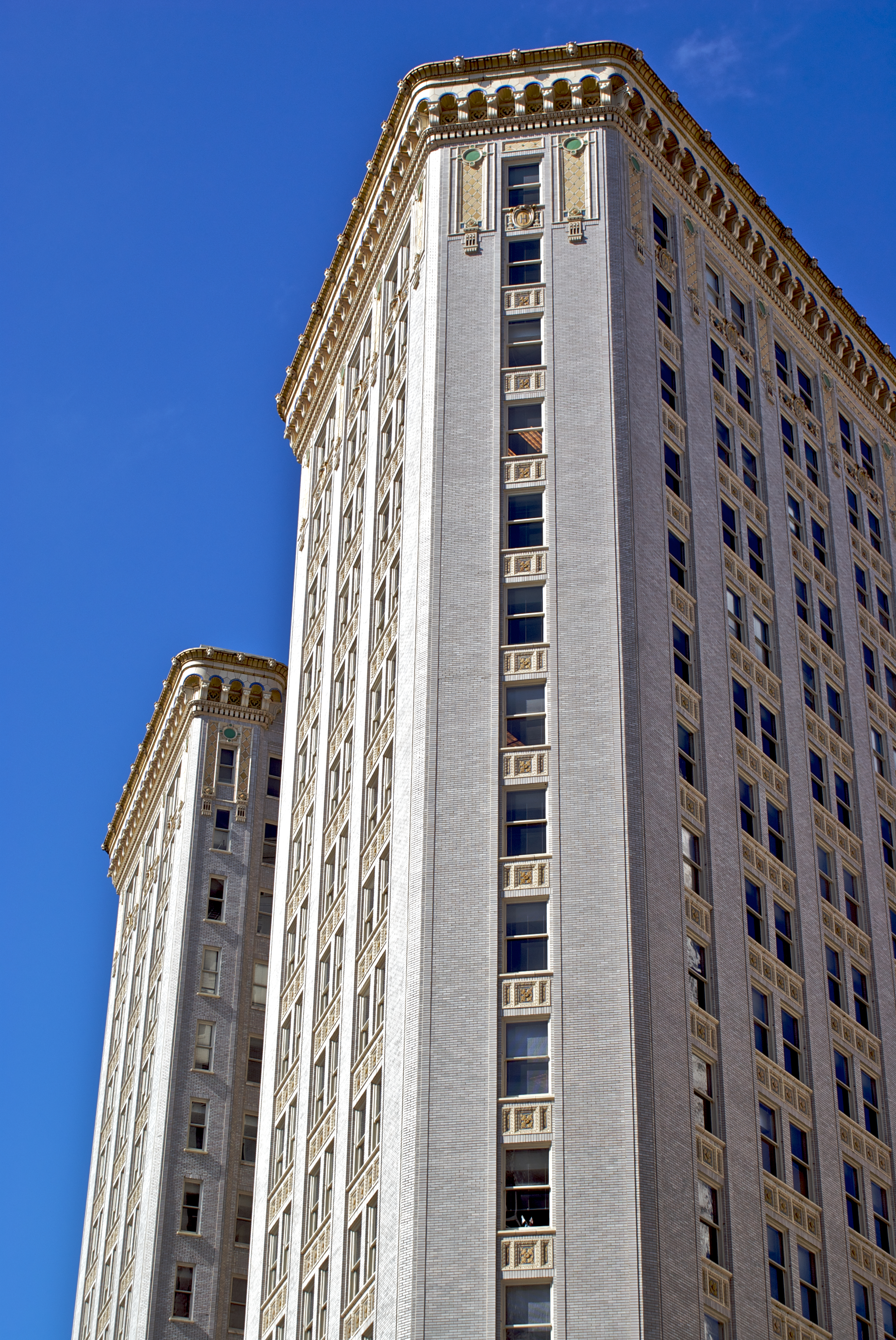
Rear section of the building

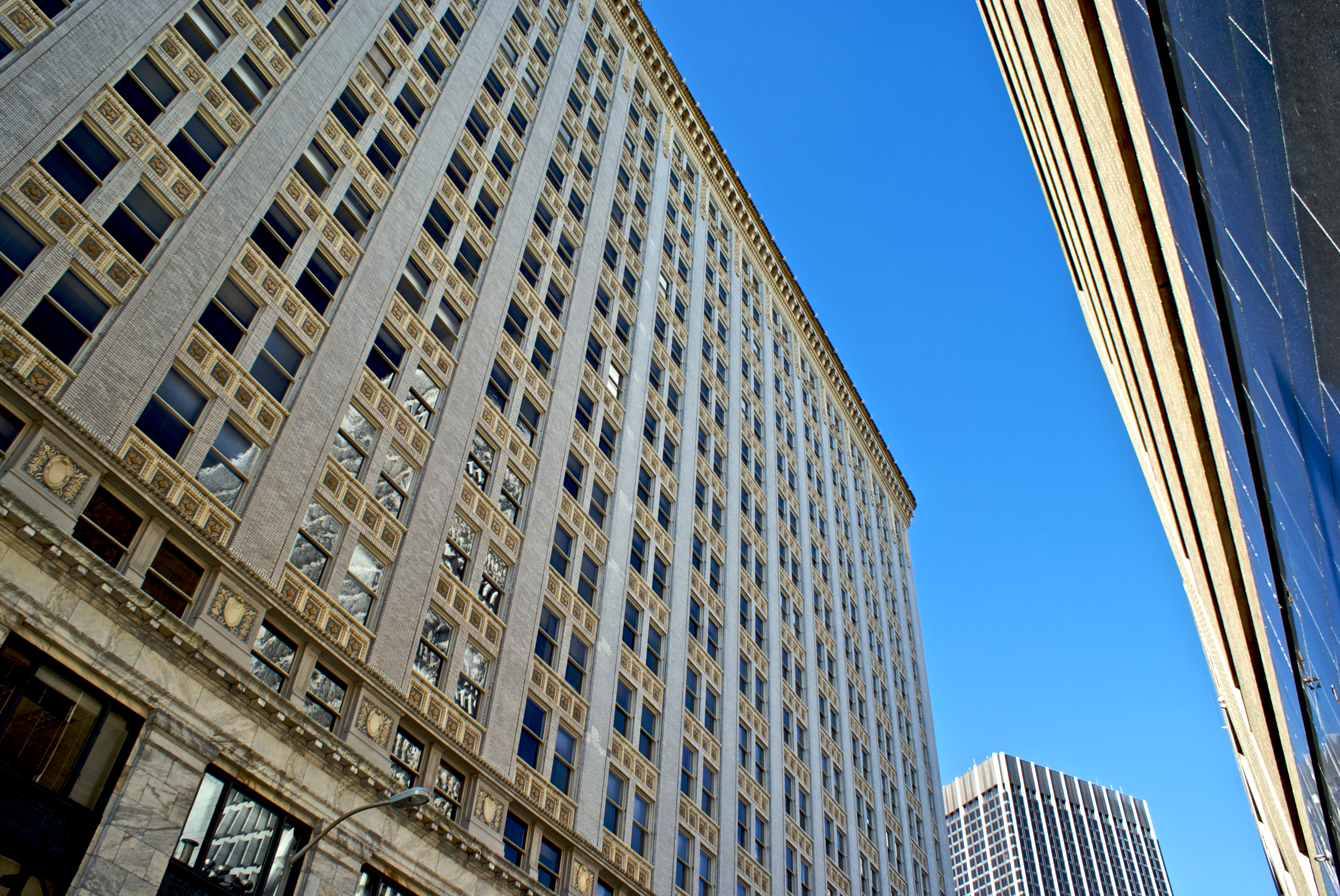
Side of the building

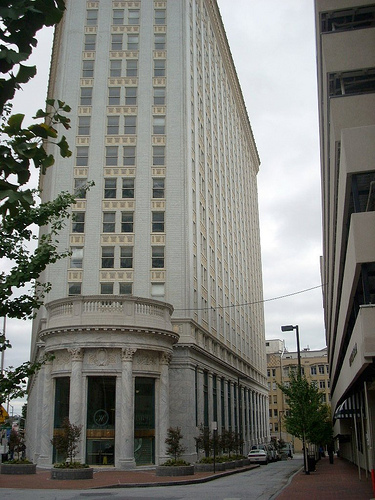
In relation to buildings around it

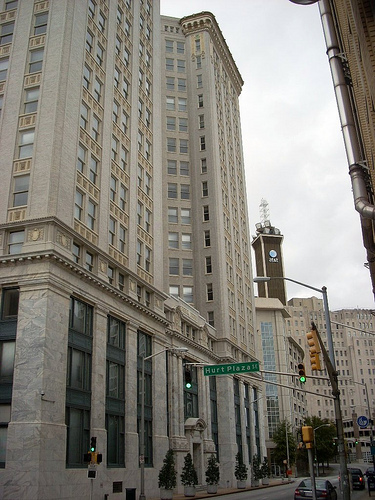
Back of building
