= Grant Henry =

American former divinity student, artist and businessman

Grant Henry, a.k.a. Sister Louisa, (born 1956) is an American former divinity student, artist, and businessman based in Atlanta, Georgia. He is best known for his artwork and installations created as his alter ego "Sister Louisa" and for being the proprietor of the popular Atlanta bar, Sister Louisa's Church of the Living Room and Ping Pong Emporium.

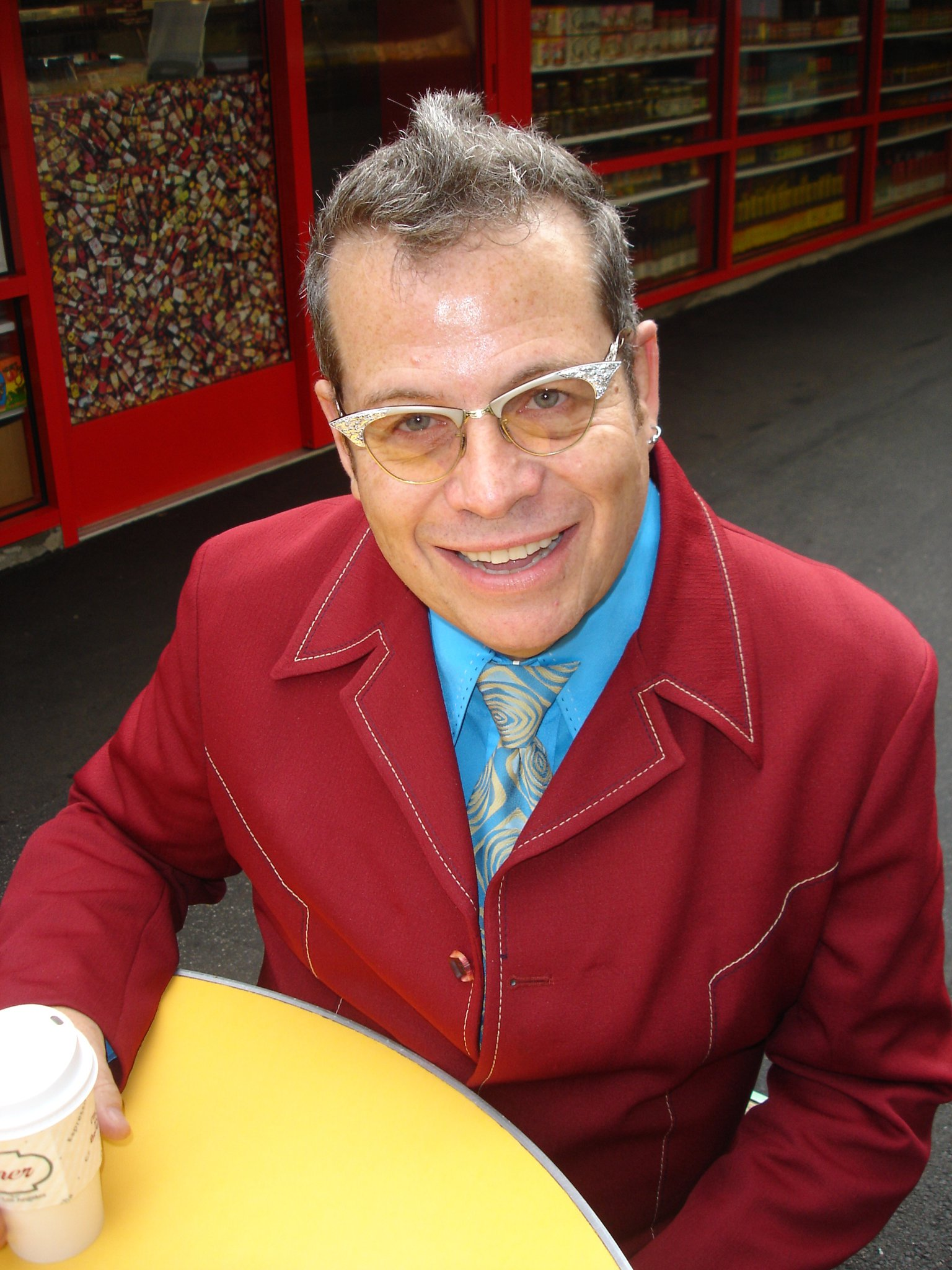
Grant Henry at Pacific Grove, Hollywood

== Early life and career ==
Grant Henry was born in Panama City, Florida, on July 1, 1956. He moved to Acworth, Georgia, in 1972 and graduated from North Cobb High School in 1974. He attended Berry College in Rome, Georgia, Florida State University, Florida International University, where he earned a BS degree in Hotel, Restaurant and Travel, Georgia State University, where he earned a M.Ed in Education, Columbia Theological Seminary and Princeton Theological Seminary, where he pursued a Master of Divinity with a concentration in Pastoral Care.

== Art ==
The work of Sister Louisa debuted in November 1996 in an art show at The Telephone Factory, an art deco loft complex in downtown Atlanta. In 2001, Henry opened an Atlanta gallery on St. Charles Ave. in Atlanta called Sister Louisa's Church of the Living Room; Come on in, Precious. At the time, Henry was bartending at a bar called The Local. He was voted "Best Bartender" in the city for 2006 and 2007 by the readership of Creative Loafing.

== Sister Louisa's Church ==
In 2010, Henry opened Sister Louisa's Church of the Living Room and Ping Pong Emporium in Atlanta's Old Fourth Ward district, the neighborhood of Martin Luther King Jr.'s boyhood home. The New York Times described the bar by writing, "this bar plays with, and spoofs, church culture. Karaoke is performed in choir robes, and walls are decorated with faux-religious pop art."
