= Renaissance Park (Atlanta) =

Park in Atlanta, Georgia, United States

Coordinates: 33.768°N 84.381°W

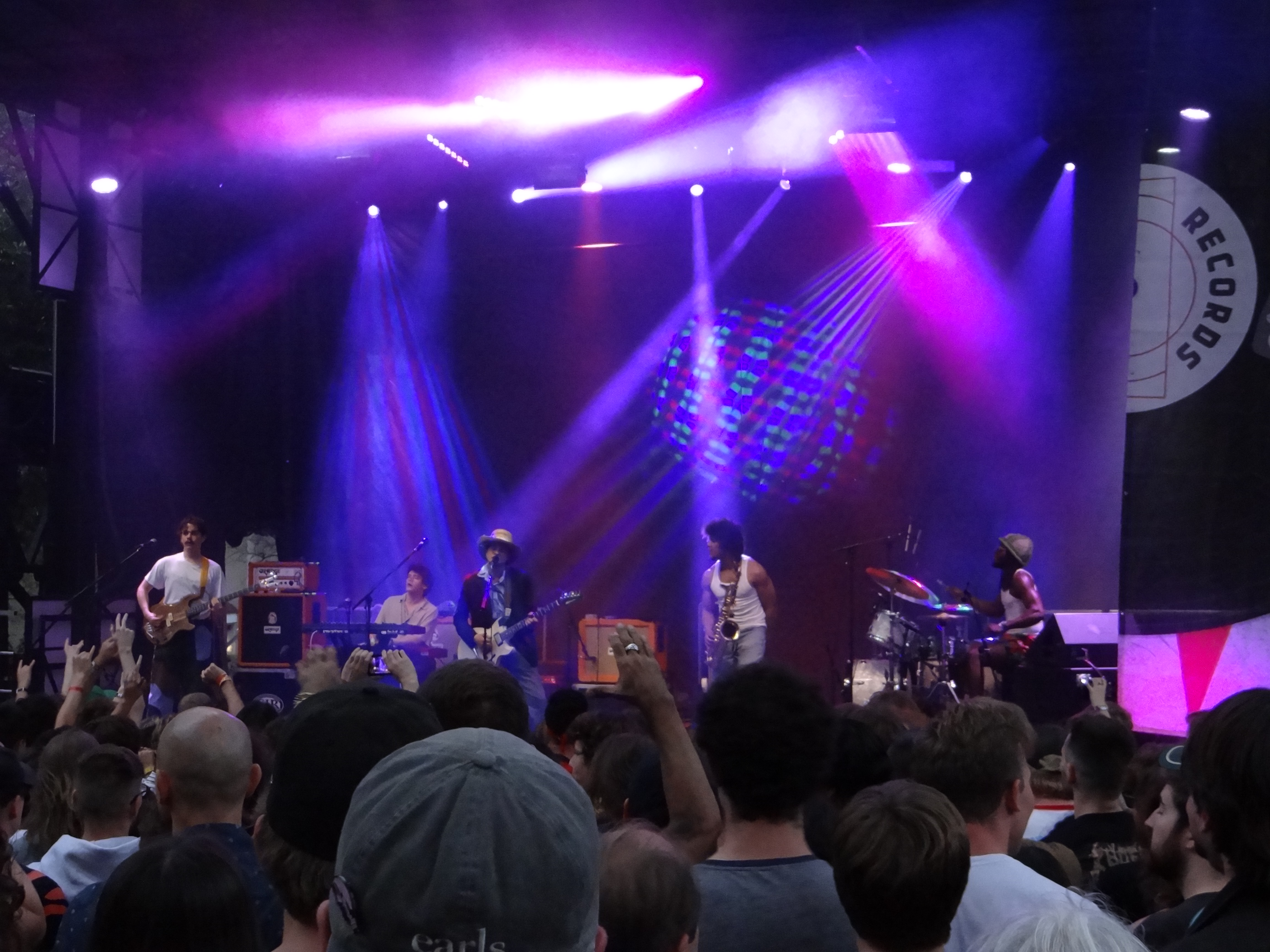
Shaky Knees Music Festival at Renaissance Park

Renaissance Park is a 5.4 acres (2.2 ha) park in the Old Fourth Ward neighborhood of Atlanta, Georgia. The land was originally part of the Buttermilk Bottom slum which was razed in the 1960s.

In a 2007 study, many area residents stated that the park is unusable due to aggressive panhandling, drug sales and use including crack cocaine, public urination, and the threat of being mugged, tying these threats and crimes to individuals using the nearby Peachtree Pine shelter.

As of November 2013, a new dog park occupies the upper portion of this park. The Renaissance Park Dog Park is a great amenity for the residents living in the Fourth Ward West neighborhood of the Old Fourth Ward and the surrounding Downtown and Midtown neighborhoods. Since the opening of the dog park, the loitering, panhandling, etc. once prevalent in the park have decreased.
