= Hurtsboro, Alabama =

- Town
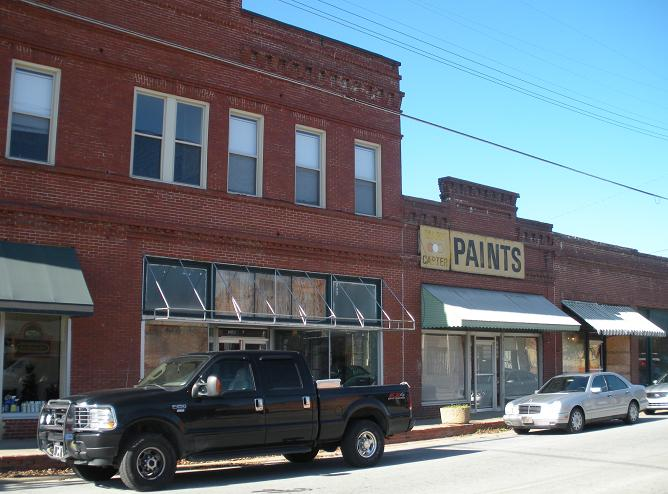

- Location of Hurtsboro in Russell County, Alabama.
- Coordinates: 32°14′24″N 85°24′53″W
- Country: United States
- State: Alabama
- County: Russell

Area
  - Total: 1.03 sq mi (2.67 km^{2})
  - Land: 1.03 sq mi (2.67 km^{2})
  - Water: 0 sq mi (0.00 km^{2})
- Elevation: 345 ft (105 m)

Population (2020)
  - Total: 349
  - Density: 338.0/sq mi (130.49/km^{2})
- Time zone: UTC-6 (Central (CST))
  - Summer (DST): UTC-5 (CDT)
- ZIP code: 36860
- Area code: 334
- FIPS code: 01-37096
- GNIS feature ID: 2405877

Hurtsboro is a town in Russell County, Alabama, United States. As of the 2020 census, Hurtsboro had a population of 349. It was founded in 1857 as Hurtsville and named for Joel Hurt, Sr. (whose son, Joel Hurt, was an important developer of Atlanta, Georgia). A railroad spur from Columbus, Georgia was completed the next year. It was incorporated in 1872 and in 1883 the town name was changed to Hurtsboro.

The town is part of the Columbus, Georgia-Alabama Metropolitan Statistical Area.

== History ==
In 1920 there was a standoff and siege at a house in Hurtsboro, Alabama, called the Hurtsboro race riot. The newspaper The Topeka State Journal called the incident a "New Race War."

== Geography ==
According to the U.S. Census Bureau, the town has a total area of 1.0 square mile (2.6 km^{2}), all land.

== Demographics ==
Historical population
Census	Pop.	Note	%±
1890	433		—
1900	407		−6.0%
1910	764		87.7%
1920	868		13.6%
1930	884		1.8%
1940	894		1.1%
1950	920		2.9%
1960	1,056		14.8%
1970	937		−11.3%
1980	752		−19.7%
1990	707		−6.0%
2000	592		−16.3%
2010	553		−6.6%
2020	349		−36.9%
U.S. Decennial Census; 2013 Estimate

=== 2020 census ===
Hurtsboro racial composition
Race	Num.	Perc.
White (non-Hispanic)	138	39.54%
Black or African American (non-Hispanic)	188	53.87%
Pacific Islander	1	0.29%
Other/Mixed	14	4.01%
Hispanic or Latino	8	2.29%

As of the 2020 United States census, there were 349 people, 221 households, and 151 families residing in the town.

=== 2000 census ===
As of the census of 2000, there were 592 people, 283 households, and 161 families residing in the town. The population density was 573.7 inhabitants per square mile (221.5/km^{2}). There were 342 housing units at an average density of 331.5 per square mile (128.0/km^{2}). The racial makeup of the town was 70.27% Black or African American, 29.39% White, and 0.34% from two or more races. 0.17% of the population were Hispanic or Latino of any race.

There were 283 households, out of which 25.1% had children under the age of 18 living with them, 31.1% were married couples living together, 23.3% had a female householder with no husband present, and 43.1% were non-families. 41.7% of all households were made up of individuals, and 18.7% had someone living alone who was 65 years of age or older. The average household size was 2.09 and the average family size was 2.86.

In the town, the population was spread out, with 24.2% under the age of 18, 7.1% from 18 to 24, 25.7% from 25 to 44, 22.8% from 45 to 64, and 20.3% who were 65 years of age or older. The median age was 40 years. For every 100 females, there were 93.5 males. For every 100 females age 18 and over, there were 82.5 males.

The median income for a household in the town was $16,691, and the median income for a family was $25,000. Males had a median income of $26,979 versus $19,821 for females. The per capita income for the town was $16,908. About 28.4% of families and 32.8% of the population were below the poverty line, including 46.3% of those under age 18 and 28.5% of those age 65 or over.

== Gallery ==
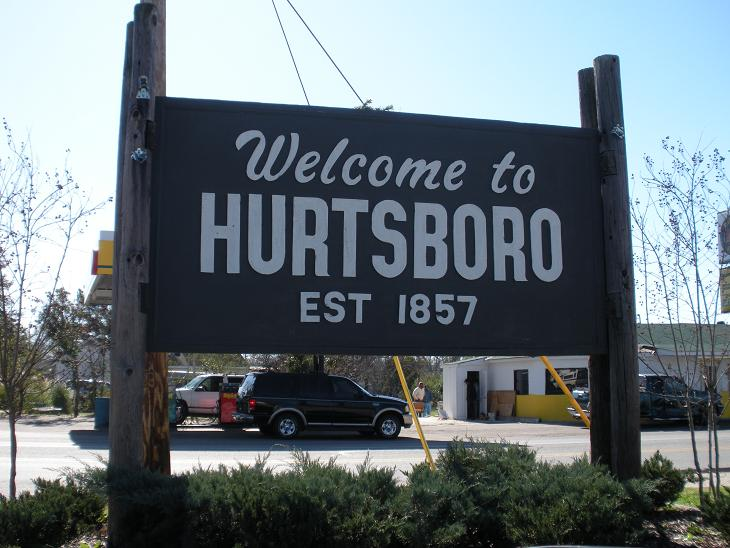
Town welcome sign

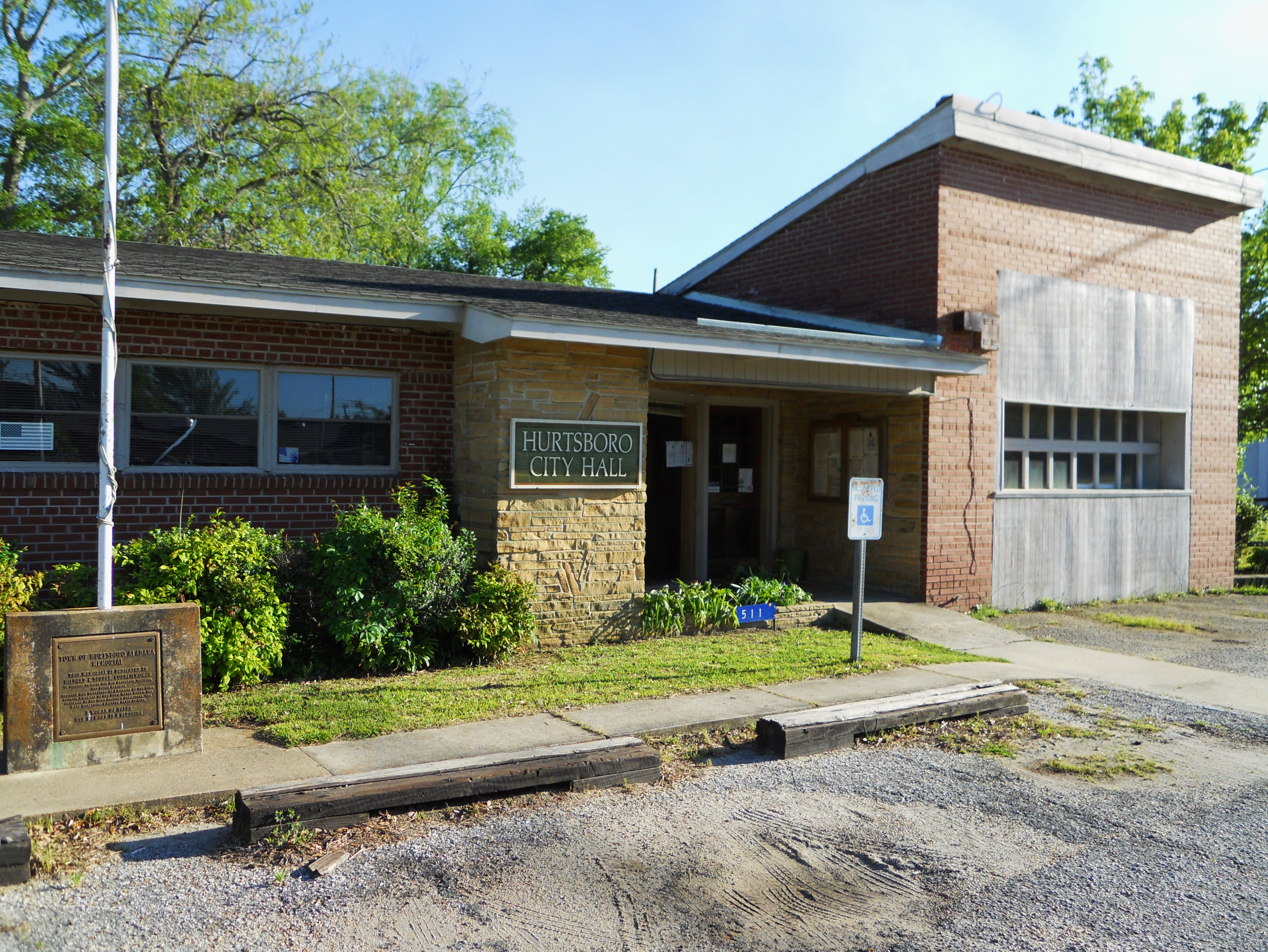
Hurtsboro City Hall

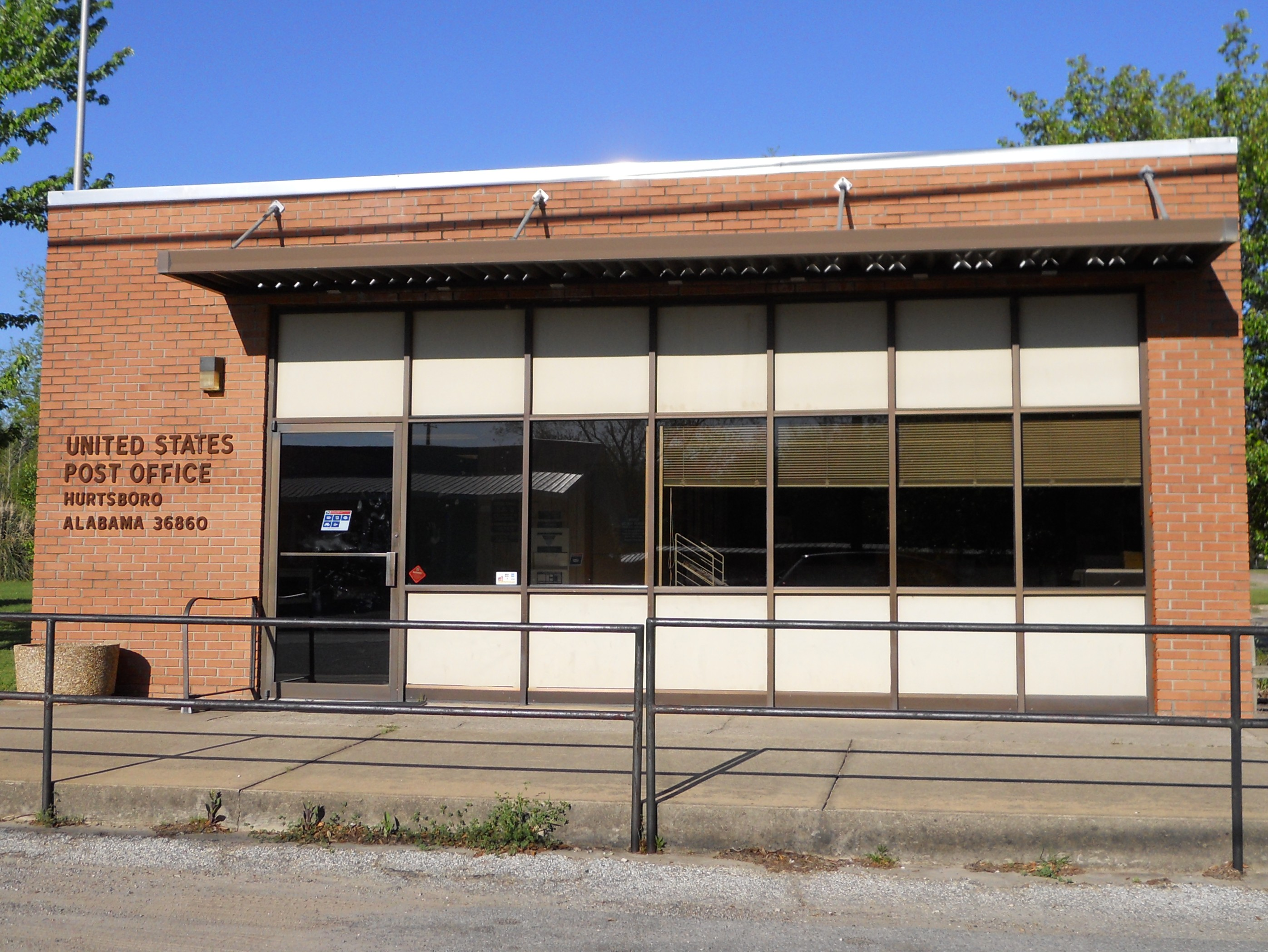
Hurtsboro Post Office (ZIP code: 36860)

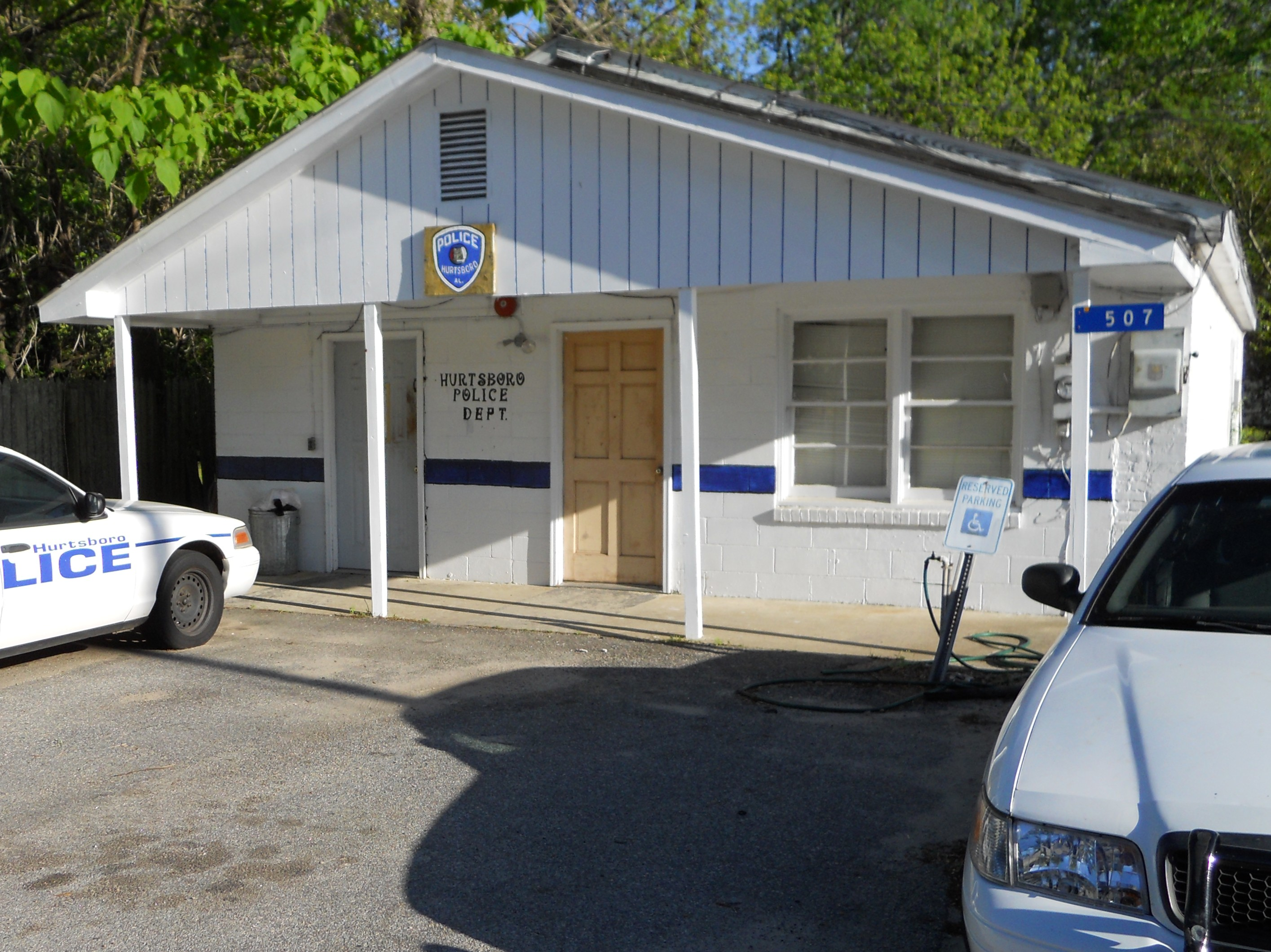
Hurtsboro Police Department

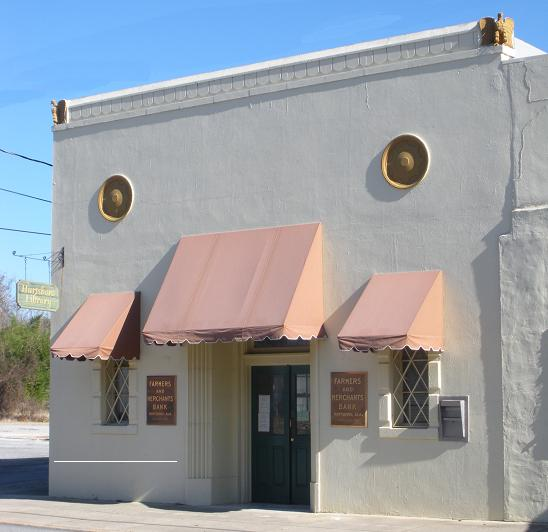
Hurtsboro Library

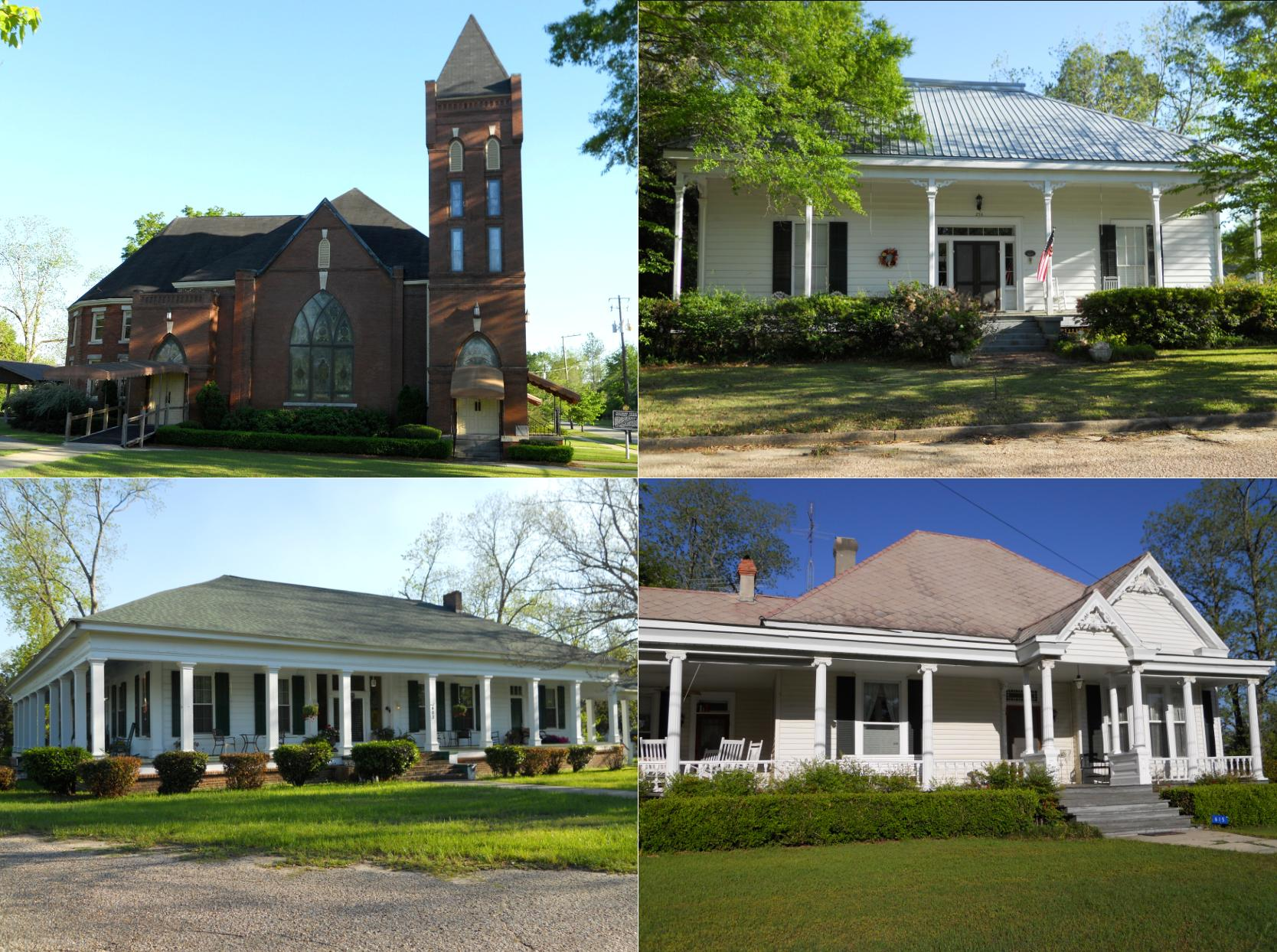
The Hurtsboro Historic District was added to the National Register of Historic Places on October 19, 2009

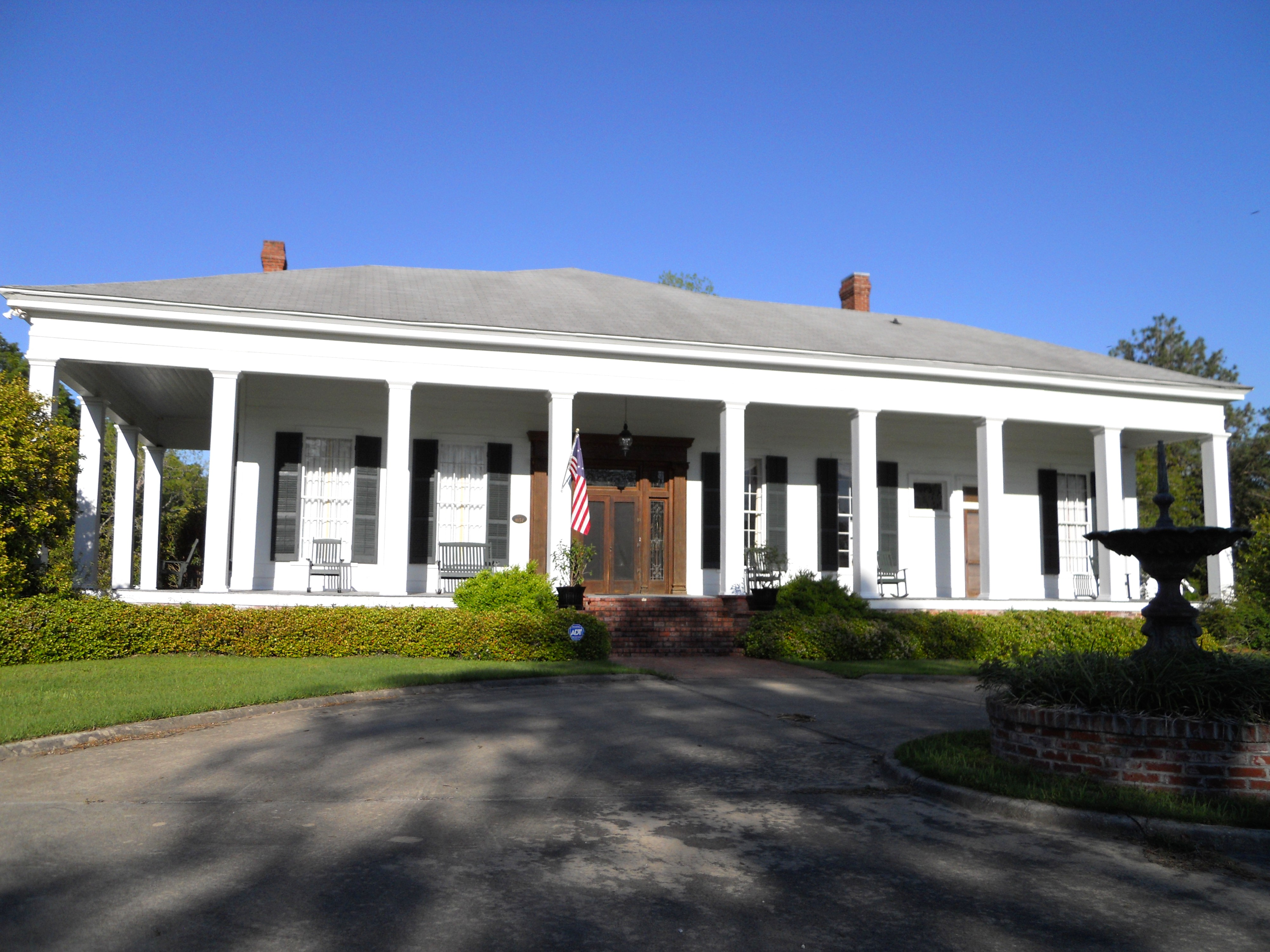
The Joel Hurt House was built in 1857. The home was added to the National Register of Historic Places on August 11, 2005.

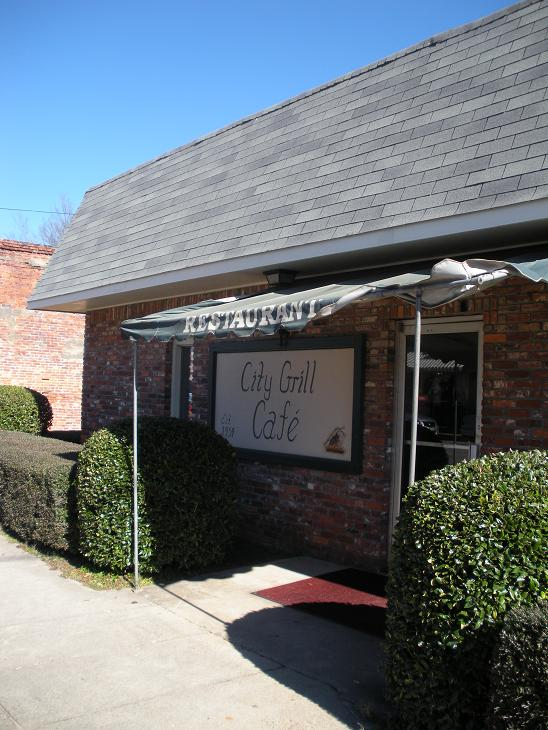
The City Grill Café is a local landmark.

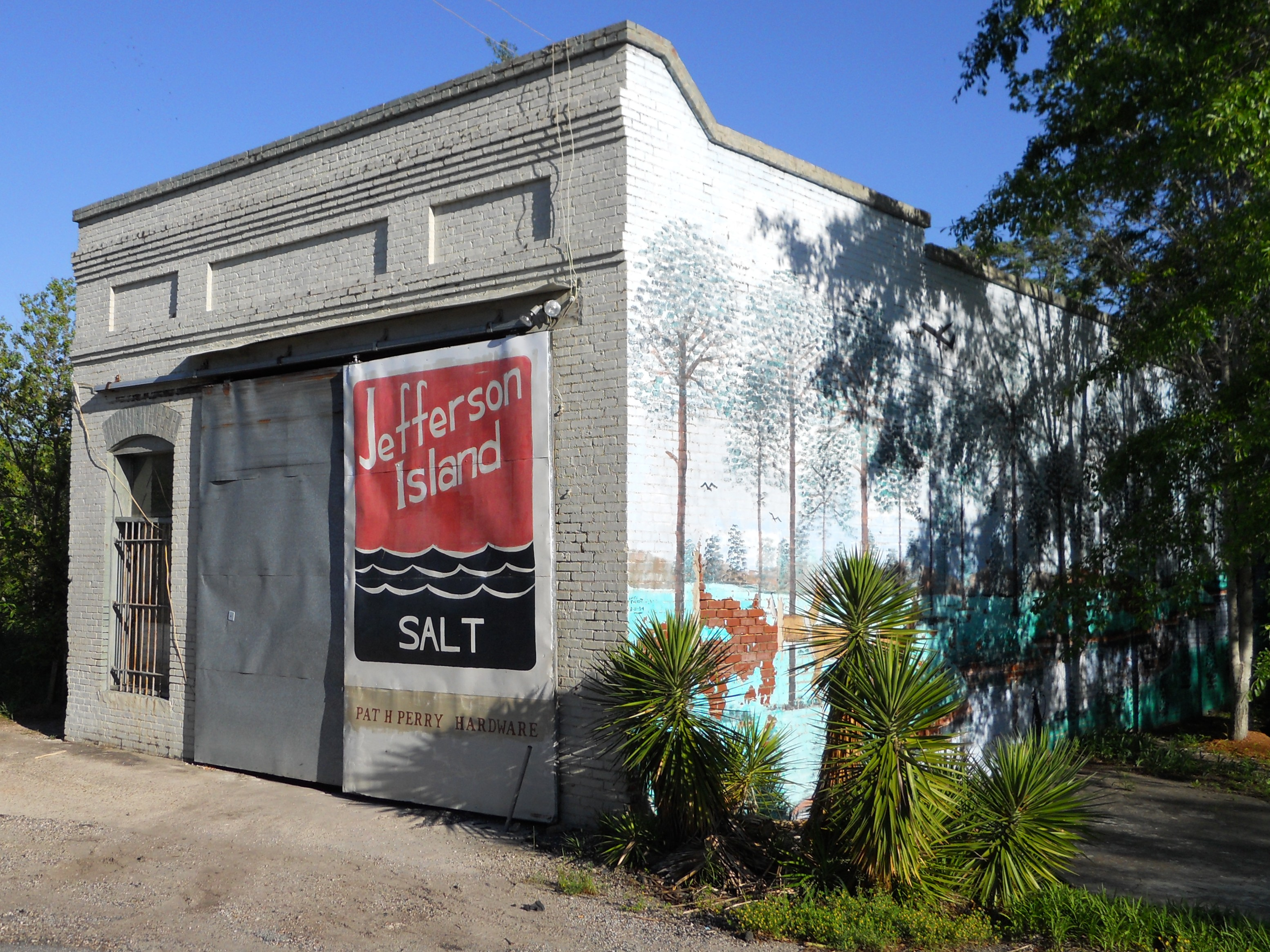
Pat H. Perry Hardware

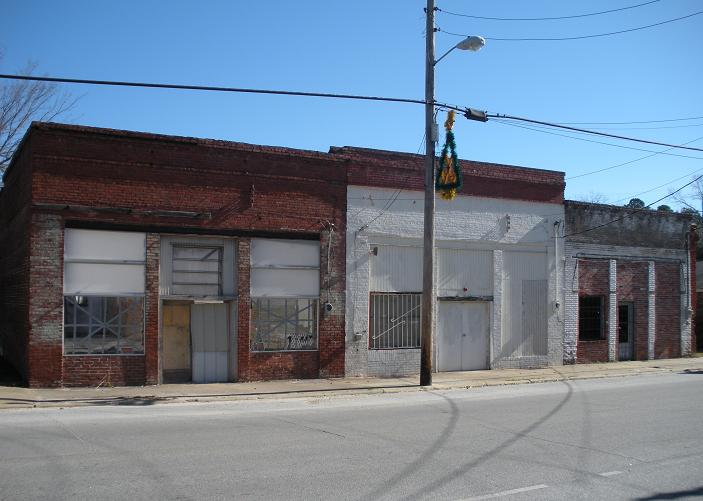
Some of the older buildings on Main Street.
