= Hurtsboro race riot =

1920 conflict in Hurtsboro, Alabama, US

Early report of race riot in Hurtsboro
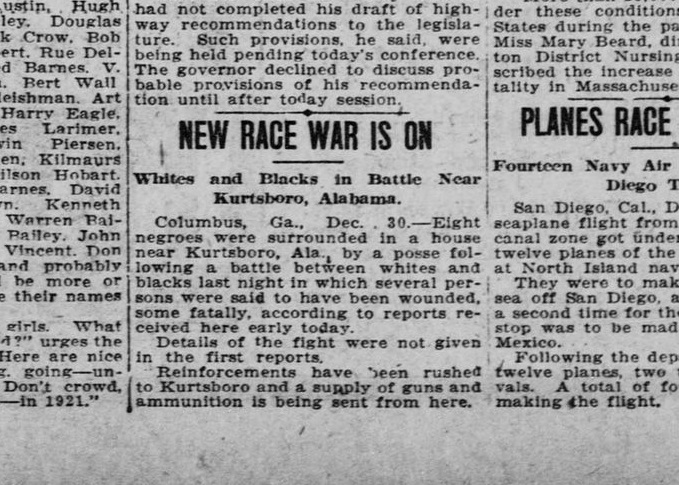
- Date: December 1920
- Location: Hurtsboro, Alabama, United States

Follow-up article
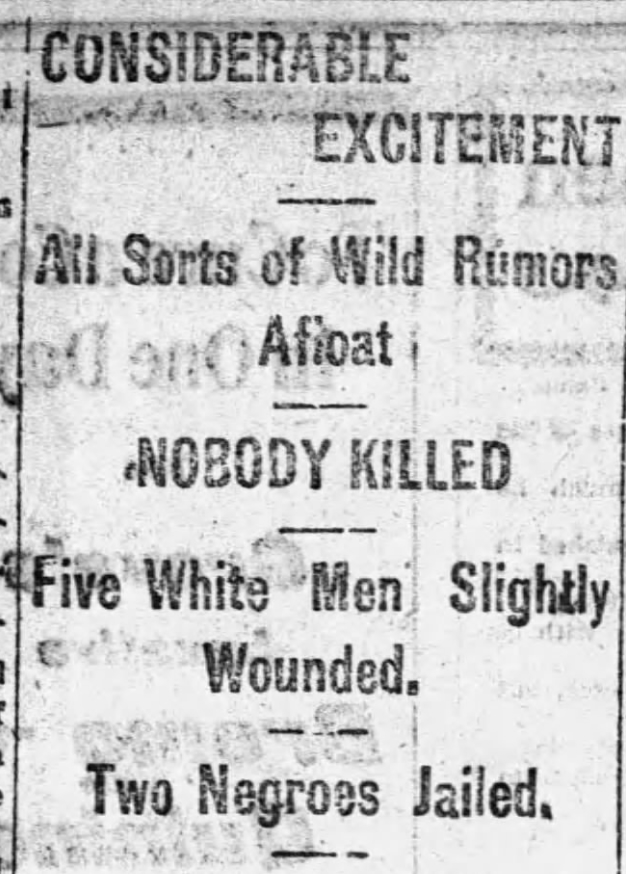
- Russell Register, Dec. 31, 1920
- Date: December 31, 1920
- Location: Hurtsboro, Alabama, United States
- Website: https://www.newspapers.com/article/russell-register-russell-register-dec/135177926/

The Hurtsboro “race riot” was an exchange of gunfire near Hurtsboro, Alabama in the final days of 1920 that was described in newspapers across the country as a deadly shoot-out between whites and blacks. In the end, a riot was avoided, no one was killed, and the suspect was released without charges.

== Background ==
In 1920, America had just gone through what is now known as the Red Summer of 1919, an outbreak of attacks on black communities by whites in more than three dozen cities and counties. The Chicago race riot and Washington D.C. race riot, which resulted in 38 and 39 deaths, respectively, were recent memories.

In this climate, when a white farmer, Joe Bagley, called the local sheriff on the night of Dec. 29, 1920, to report that his wife had been assaulted by a black man, and that he had been knocked unconscious, the sheriff was quick to form a posse and respond.

== Two arrested ==
At about 2 a.m. on Dec. 30, Russell County Deputy Sheriff W.E. Dozier approached a house about 4 miles (6.4 km) from Pittsview, Alabama. The suspect, L.C. Hill, was inside, along with his brother, Cleveland Hill. Dozier brought with him a warrant sworn out by Joe Bagley and posse of about eight men, including Bagley, his brother Walter, and George Hart.

The plan was that Dozier would go to the door while the rest stationed themselves around the house. Dozier shouted that L.C. Hill should come outside. Hill shouted back that his wife was sick and he could not go anywhere until morning. “‘I’ll have to ask you to come along now,’ Dozier is said to have answered, whereupon Hill struck a light and began dressing, remarking that ‘white folks . . . ain’t treating the ole n- - - - right.’”

At this point the posse began to shoot; later estimates said about 100 bullets were fired. L.C. Hill was shot in the foot, and Dozier, Hart, and Joe and Walter Bagley were wounded, none seriously. Hill was captured without resistance, and officers went back later to the house and arrested Cleveland Hill. Both Hill brothers were taken to the Seale, Alabama, jail.

== Press coverage ==
A different version of events, however, soon circulated. Newspaper reports said, variously, that six white men had been killed, eight black men were barricaded in a house, and that the posse could not get within range. A headline in The Topeka State Journal read, "New Race War Is On." Versions of the race riot story were picked up by newspapers in Delaware, Tennessee, Pennsylvania, North Carolina, Montana and Florida.

In response to local newspaper reports, between 100 and 150 men assembled in Hurtsboro. “Sheriff Ragland’s posse of 150 men is conducting the search in high powered automobiles and are heavily armed with shotguns and rifles,” wrote The Tuscaloosa News. When Sheriff Tom Moore of nearby Columbus, Georgia, heard about a race riot in Hurtsboro, he sent a supply of riot guns. "Citizens of the entire district are aroused to a pitch of feeling not equalled in many years and many persons expressed the opinion that the officers would never be able to bring the negroes here in safety," the Tuscaloosa News story added, in an apparent reference to the possibility of a lynching.

But within days, newspapers were printing clarifications. “These conflicting reports greatly exaggerated the affair but the community of Pittsview was entirely calm and peaceful before noon despite fresh stories painting vivid pictures of the ‘desperate’ gun battle,” wrote The Montgomery Advertiser.

The Russell Register tried to make amends with a story headlined, “Considerable Excitement, All Sorts of Wild Rumors Afloat, NOBODY KILLED.” In Union Springs, Ala., the local paper wrote, “The disturbance at Pittsview, Russell County, last week, proved for a while to be a very much exaggerated affair, in that reports went over the country to the effect that a regular race war as on, and several white people had been killed.”

The men gathered in Hurtsboro were sent home by the sheriff. Two days later, the sheriff’s office issued a statement: “Wildly exaggerated reports were responsible for the entire affair.”

== Hill brothers exonerated ==
On December 31, 1920, Sheriff Henry T. Ragland announced that L.C. Hill would not be charged with assault. In April 1921, the Montgomery County grand jury declined to indict him, and he was released from the Montgomery county jail without charges. Cleveland Hill was also exonerated in the Pittsview incident, but he was not released: instead he was remanded to Georgia on a charge of murder. In May 1921, he was indicted by a grand jury for the murder of a black man named Jack Knight. On December 8, 1931, Cleveland died of heart failure at age 47 while in jail for a Prohibition conviction.

== Bibliography ==
Notes

References

- The New York Times (October 5, 1919). "For Action on Race Riot Peril". The New York Times. New York, NY. ISSN 1553-8095. OCLC 1645522.
- "Negroes shoot 5 of posse searching for woman's assailant". Richmond Times-Dispatch. Richmond, Virginia: Times Dispatch Pub. Co. December 31, 1920. pp. 1–10. ISSN 2333-7761. OCLC 9493729.
- "New Race War Is On". The Topeka State Journal. Topeka, Shawnee, Kansas: F.P. MacLennan. December 30, 1920. pp. 1–8. ISSN 2377-7117. OCLC 9124974.
