= Equitable Building (Atlanta 1892) =

Former office building (1892–1971)

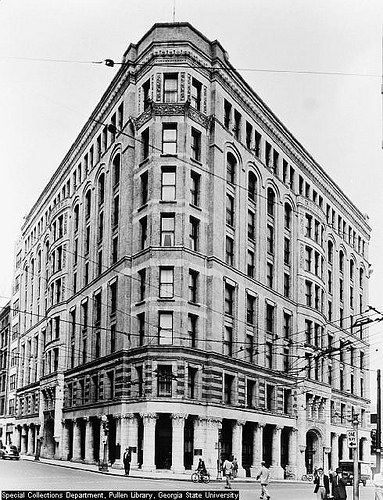
- Interactive map of the Equitable Building area

General information
- Type: Commercial offices
- Location: 30-44 Edgewood Avenue SE; Atlanta, Georgia, United States
- Coordinates: 33.754372°N 84.387585°W
- Opening: 1892
- Demolished: 1971

Height
- Antenna spire: 118 ft (36 m)
- Roof: 105 ft (32 m)

Technical details
- Floor count: 8
- Lifts/elevators: 4

Design and construction
- Architect: Burnham and Root
- Main contractor: George A. Fuller Company

Equitable Building was a 118 ft (36 m), eight-story building at 30 Edgewood Avenue SE, in Atlanta, Georgia, United States.

== History ==
The Equitable Building was built for Joel Hurt, a prominent Atlanta developer and streetcar magnate. It was designed by Chicago's Burnham and Root, the firm established by Georgia-born architect John Wellborn Root (1850-1891) and his partner Daniel Hudson Burnham. When completed in 1892 it was the tallest building with the most floors in Atlanta outside the State Capitol until 1897.

The building was demolished in 1971.

== See also ==
- List of tallest buildings in Atlanta
- Equitable Building (Atlanta)
