= Joel Hurt =

American businessman (1850–1926)

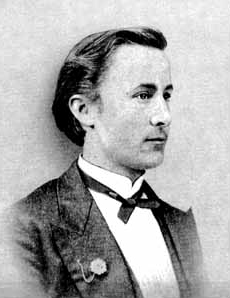
- Born: July 31, 1850; Hurtsboro, Alabama, U.S.
- Died: 1926 (aged 75–76)
- Education: University of Georgia
- Spouse: Annie Bright Woodruff
- Children: 6
- Parent(s): Joel Hurt, Sr. Lucy Apperson Long

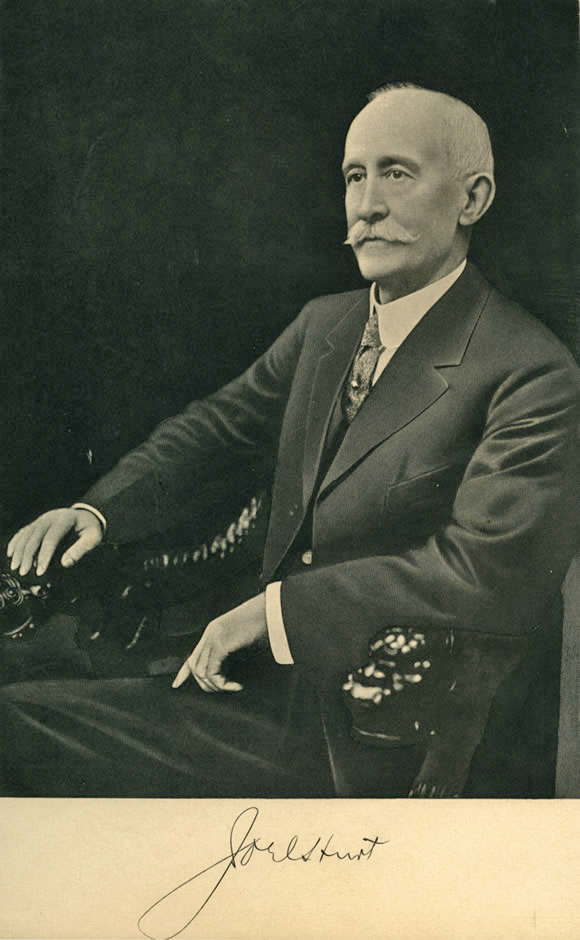
Joel Hurt ca. 1900

Joel Hurt (1850–1926) was an American businessman. He was the president of Trust Company of Georgia, and a developer in Atlanta. He was one of the many founders of SunTrust Bank.

== Early life ==
Hurt was born on July 31, 1850, in Hurtsboro, Alabama, to Lucy Apperson Long (1822–1915) and Joel Hurt Sr. (1813–1861). The town was originally named Hurtville for Joel Hurt Sr. He grew up in the Joel Hurt House. After attending Auburn Methodist College in Auburn, Alabama, for one year, he then enrolled at the University of Georgia in Athens, graduating in 1871 with a degree in civil engineering.

== Career ==
He began his career in the railroad business, surveying first in the western United States the rail bed that became the Atchison, Topeka and Santa Fe. He also surveyed a small spur off the Richmond and Danville line to Athens, Georgia.

In 1875, Hurt moved to Atlanta, where he organized the Atlanta Building and Loan Association, which he ran for thirty-two years. He also co-founded the Trust Company of Georgia—now part of Suntrust—and, starting in 1895, was its president for nine years. In 1882, he organized the East Atlanta Land Company, where he designed and developed Inman Park, a residential area connected to the city center by his Atlanta and Edgewood Street Railway Company, which opened along Edgewood Avenue in 1886. It was Atlanta's first electric streetcar line, and it was the first profitable electric line in America. In 1880, he filed a patent for a thermal water valve and, in 1887, another for a new style of valve cock for faucets handling water under pressure.

To anchor the downtown end of his streetcar line, he built Atlanta's first skyscraper, the Equitable Building, which in 1893 became the home of the two-year-old Trust Company. His next land deal was to be Druid Hills, for which he hired the Olmsted Brothers to design a linear park along Ponce de Leon Avenue, but he sold the enterprise to Asa Candler for half a million dollars in 1908. He also built Atlanta's first fireproof theater, the Atlanta Theater (also on Edgewood), and his masterpiece, the Hurt Building (which still stands).

In 1908, Hurt was unrepentant in hearings which brought out the shocking abuses in the Hurt family's convict labor camps. His callous indifference to evidence that many of his workers had died of abuse, and his viciousness in asserting that convict workers could not be beaten enough, horrified even contemporary Georgians. These hearings led in large part to the banning of convict leasing in Georgia.

== Personal life, death and legacy ==
Hurt married Annie Bright Woodruff, and they had six children. He died in 1926.

In 1940, land was donated to the city by the Trust Company and a park was dedicated as Hurt Park which lies across Peachtree Center Ave. from the Hurt Building. The Joel Hurt Cottage still stands near Elizabeth and Euclid Streets in Inman Park.

Wall Street Journal bureau chief Douglas Blackmon's 2009 Pulitzer Prize-winning book, Slavery by Another Name, revealed the extent to which Joel Hurt's fortune was built upon the profitable and exploitative use of harshly-disciplined and cruelly-deprived convict labor.

Preceded by Robert Lowry	President of Trust Company of Georgia; 1895 – 1904	Succeeded by Ernest Woodruff
