= Sister Louisa's Church of the Living Room and Ping Pong Emporium =

Bar in the Old Fourth Ward neighborhood of Atlanta, Georgia, United States

Coordinates: 33.7544°N 84.3723°W

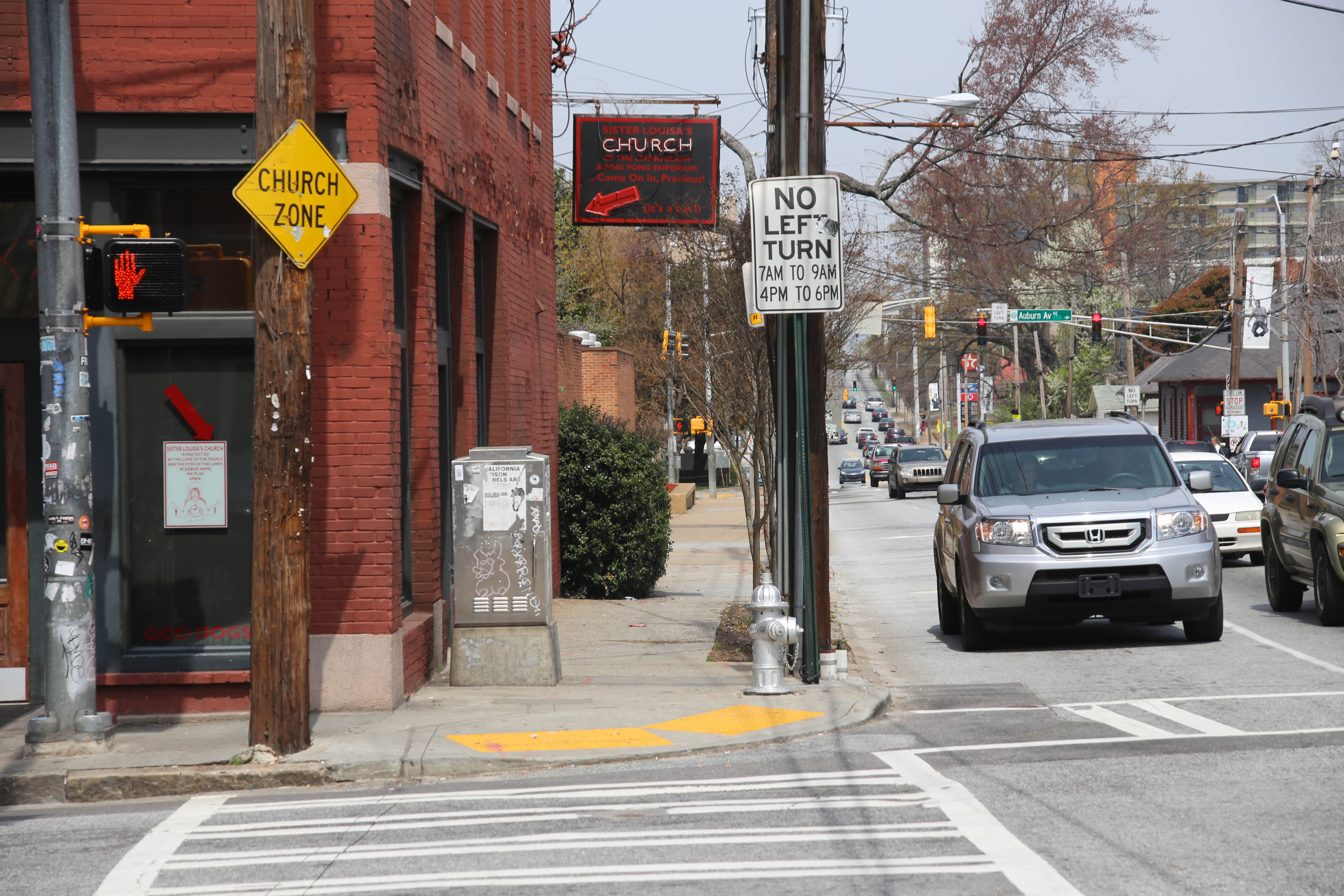
Edgewood Avenue in the Old Fourth Ward and "Church" bar

Sister Louisa's Church of the Living Room and Ping Pong Emporium, or simply Church, is a bar on Edgewood Avenue in the Old Fourth Ward of Atlanta, Georgia, in the United States. It is owned by Grant Henry.

In 2014, a sister location opened in downtown Athens.

== History ==
Church was opened in 2010. The New York Times described the bar by writing, "this bar plays with, and spoofs, church culture. Karaoke is performed in choir robes, and walls are decorated with faux-religious pop art."

In 2014, a second location opened in downtown Athens, Georgia on West Clayton Street.
