= Edgewood Avenue =

Avenue in Atlanta, Georgia, US

Location of western and eastern ends of Edgewood Ave. in Intown Atlanta

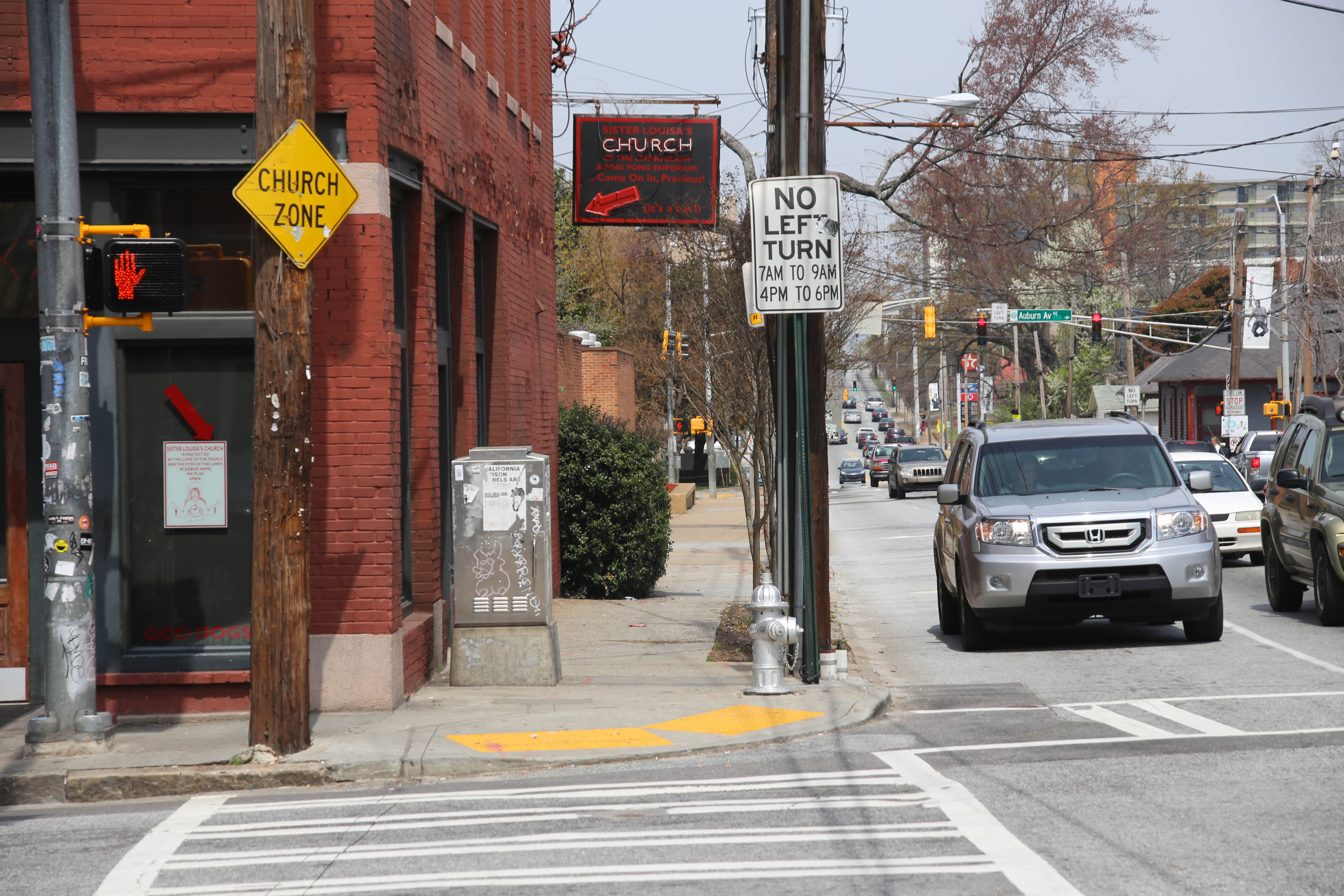
Edgewood Avenue near Boulevard and "Church" bar

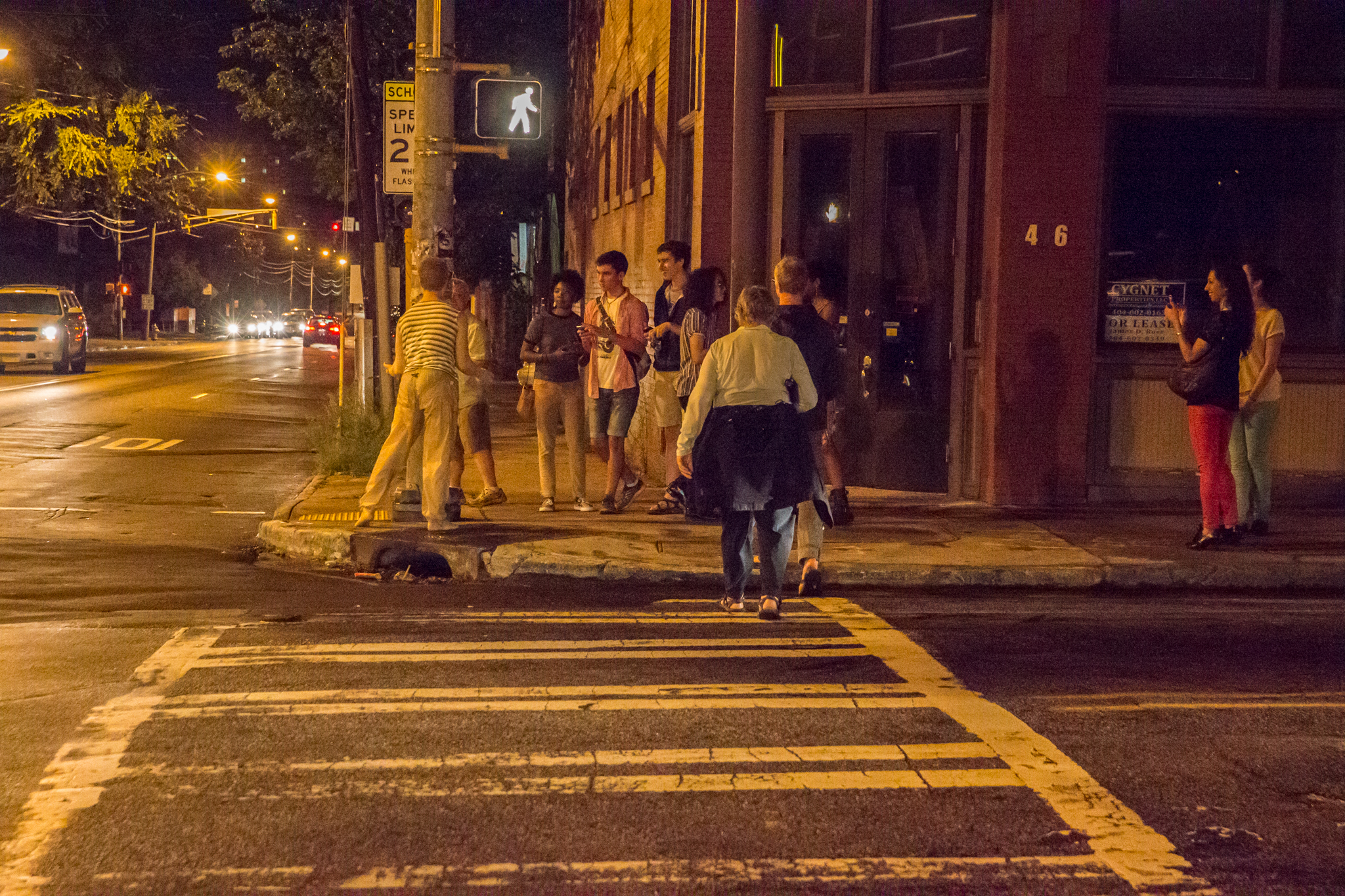
Edgewood Avenue near Boulevard at night

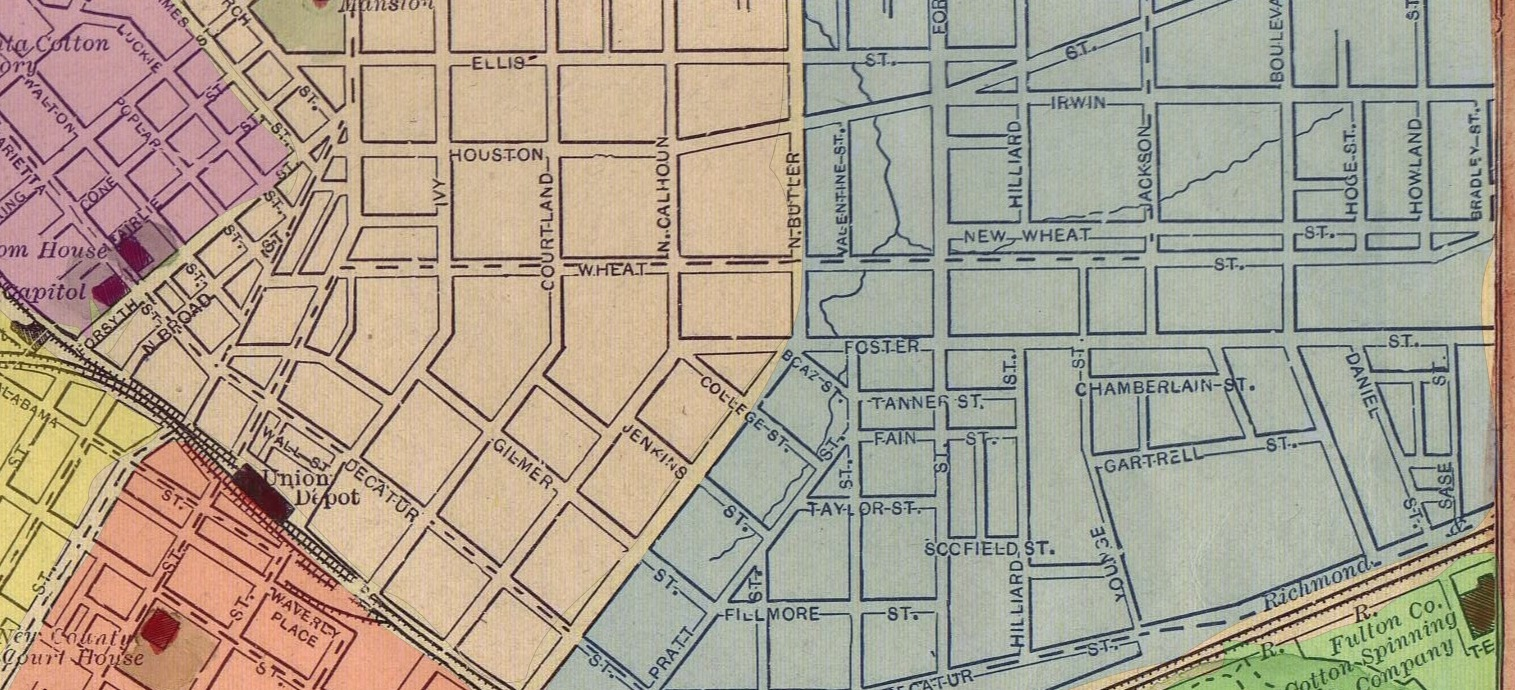
1883 map showing Foster Street, before Edgewood Avenue existed

Edgewood Avenue is a street in Atlanta, Georgia, United States which originates in Five Points in Downtown Atlanta, and runs eastward through the historic Old Fourth Ward and Sweet Auburn districts. The avenue was named because it points toward the Edgewood neighborhood, but it historically terminates just short of it, ending right at Hurt Street in Inman Park. The street was explicitly widened and constructed to carry the streetcar line to Inman Park, Atlanta's first garden suburb and home to many of its most prominent citizens. Today, the avenue is known for its restaurants and nightlife around its intersection with Boulevard.

== History ==
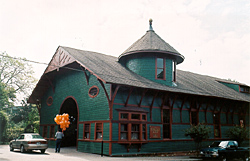
Old Trolley Barn of the Atlanta & Edgewood Street Railroad at Edgewood Avenue in Inman Park

Edgewood Avenue has its origins with the Atlanta & Edgewood Street Railroad Company, originally chartered to operate horse-drawn streetcars along Foster Street to what was then the separate village of Edgewood. The company, owned by Joel Hurt, introduced Atlanta's first electric streetcar service in 1889. The streetcar was designed to make Hurt's garden suburb, Inman Park, easily and comfortably accessible.

At the time, on the present route of Edgewood Avenue, there existed two streets: Line Street, which ran from Peachtree Street east to Pryor Street, and Foster Street, which ran east from Calhoun (now Piedmont Avenue) due east towards the town of Edgewood. In between were 94 houses and lots. In order to provide a direct rout for the railway, Hurt's East Atlanta Land Company demolished the dwellings, built the missing road, and improved the entire avenue, rechristening it with its present name.

== Restaurant and bar district ==
After decades of municipal neglect, the part of the avenue located in the Old Fourth Ward has become a bar and restaurant district, home to a number of Atlanta's most eclectic nightspots. These include Sister Louisa's Church of the Living Room and Ping Pong Emporium a.k.a. simply Church, Corner Tavern and Circa. Bar and restaurant-owners are attracted to Edgewood's "non-corporate" feel, mostly due to its urban layout and historic buildings showcasing turn-of-the-century architecture. This all showing another period of growth and maturity for the corridor, since 2013 when Edgewood Avenue around Boulevard had been perceived by some as a site of "drug traffic, petty crime, and homeless hideaways".

As of 2014, more eating and drinking establishments are opening, such as Bad Dog Taqueria, the Music Room, and Panbury's Double Crust Pies, as owners seek to capitalize on improved access to the area, particularly to tourists from downtown, via the Atlanta Streetcar, which will start service in late 2014.

In 2013, Creative Loafing editor Cliff Bostock called Edgewood Avenue "the most 'diverse' party and dining area in the city ... I'm talking age, sexual orientation, and lifestyle, as much as race." In April 2014, Atlanta magazine noted that the avenue had become "a foodie hangout", and only "recently". The article quoted Keiran Neely, co-owner of Pizzeria Vesuvius and the Music Room, as saying: "Edgewood Avenue has begun to explode based on the streetcar ... It seems like every week there’s a new restaurant or bar."

== Transportation ==
Since late 2014 the Atlanta Streetcar has operated service along Edgewood Avenue eastbound from Park Place NE to Jackson St. NE, connecting the Centennial Olympic Park area in Downtown Atlanta to Sweet Auburn and the Martin Luther King, Jr., National Historic Site.

At each end, Edgewood Avenue is served by MARTA trains, at Five Points and Inman Park/Reynoldstown stations.

From 2013 to 2014, the Edgewood Avenue Bridge over the BeltLine trail was demolished and replaced, costing US$4.5 million.

== Route and Points of Interest ==
Source: ""Edgewood Ave SE, Atlanta, GA, USA" (Map). Google Maps.

Neighborhood	Intersection	Points of Interest
Downtown Atlanta	Peachtree St., Marietta St., Decatur St.	Five Points. Woodruff Park. 25 Park Place.
Downtown Atlanta	Park Place	Atlanta Streetcar eastbound enters Edgewood Ave. Hurt Building.
Downtown Atlanta	Peachtree Center Ave.	Hurt Park. Hurt Park streetcar stop.
Downtown Atlanta	Courtland St.	Dixie Coca-Cola Bottling Company Plant at #125. Georgia State University buildings. MLK Preservation District begins, ends at Downtown Connector.
Downtown Atlanta	Piedmont Avenue	
Downtown Atlanta	Jesse Hill Dr.	Sweet Auburn Curb Market and streetcar stop.
Sweet Auburn	bridge under Downtown Connector	John Wesley Dobbs Plaza
Sweet Auburn	Hilliard St.	MLK Preservation District begins again, ends at Jackson. Hilliard streetcar stop.
Sweet Auburn	Jackson St.	Martin Luther King, Jr., National Historic Site, Atlanta Streetcar turns north
Old Fourth Ward	Boulevard	Sister Louisa's Church
Old Fourth Ward	Randolph St.	
Inman Park	BeltLine trail (bridge)	
Inman Park	Krog St.	Krog Street Market
Inman Park	Euclid Ave.	Inman Park, Delta Park, Victorian mansions
Inman Park	Waverly Way	Springvale Park, Trolley Barn
Inman Park	Hurt St.	Street ends at Inman Park/Reynoldstown MARTA station
