= Atlanta and Edgewood Street Railroad =

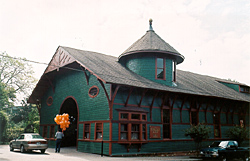
Old Trolley Barn of the Atlanta & Edgewood Street Railroad at Edgewood Avenue in Inman Park, now in use as an events center

The Atlanta & Edgewood Street Railroad Company of Atlanta, Georgia was organized in 1886 by Joel Hurt, C. W. Hubner, H. E. W. Palmer, W. P. Inman, Peter Lynch, R. C. Mitchell, Asa Griggs Candler, J. P. McDonald, J. G. Reynolds, A. F. Moreland, and P. H. Harralson. It was originally authorized to run horsecars along Foster Street (which would soon be renamed Edgewood Avenue) to what was then the separate village of Edgewood.

Soon thereafter the Atlanta & Edgewood introduced Atlanta's first electric streetcar service in 1889. Hurt owned the East Atlanta Land Company which improved Edgewood Avenue (demolishing 94 existing dwellings to do so). The cars featured oak interiors and plate glass windows valued at $4,000. The steel rails were gauges heavier than those used on the Georgia Railroad which ran parallel just to the south. The rails were elevated on stone piers and surrounded by paving made of Belgian block. The streetcar was designed to make easily and comfortably accessible Hurt's garden suburb, Inman Park.

== See also ==
- Streetcars in Atlanta
- Timeline of mass transit in Atlanta
