= Buttermilk Bottom =

African American neighborhood

Coordinates: 33.76705°N 84.38032°W

Buttermilk Bottom, also known as Buttermilk Bottoms or Black Bottom, was an African-American neighborhood in central Atlanta, centered on the area where the Atlanta Civic Center now stands in the Old Fourth Ward. It was considered a slum area, having unpaved streets and no electricity.

The name may refer to

- the downward slope of the sewers in the area, which caused the backed-up water to have a buttermilk smell
- residents being unable to afford "sweet" milk, or fresh milk, and instead drinking sour, older milk, which was cultured to add longevity and shelf life to the product in the era prior to modern refrigeration

== History ==
Most of Buttermilk Bottom was razed in the 1960s to make way for urban redevelopment projects, most notably Atlanta's convention center (built 1967), now the Boisfeuillet Jones Atlanta Civic Center. After the destruction of Buttermilk Bottom the area was rechristened Bedford Pine. However, most of the land remained empty until the mid-1980s when new, mostly mixed-income projects were built on the land. Some of the land was used for today's Renaissance Park and Central Park.

== See also ==
- Bedford Pine
