= Old Fourth Ward =

Neighborhood in Atlanta, Georgia

- Neighborhoods of Atlanta
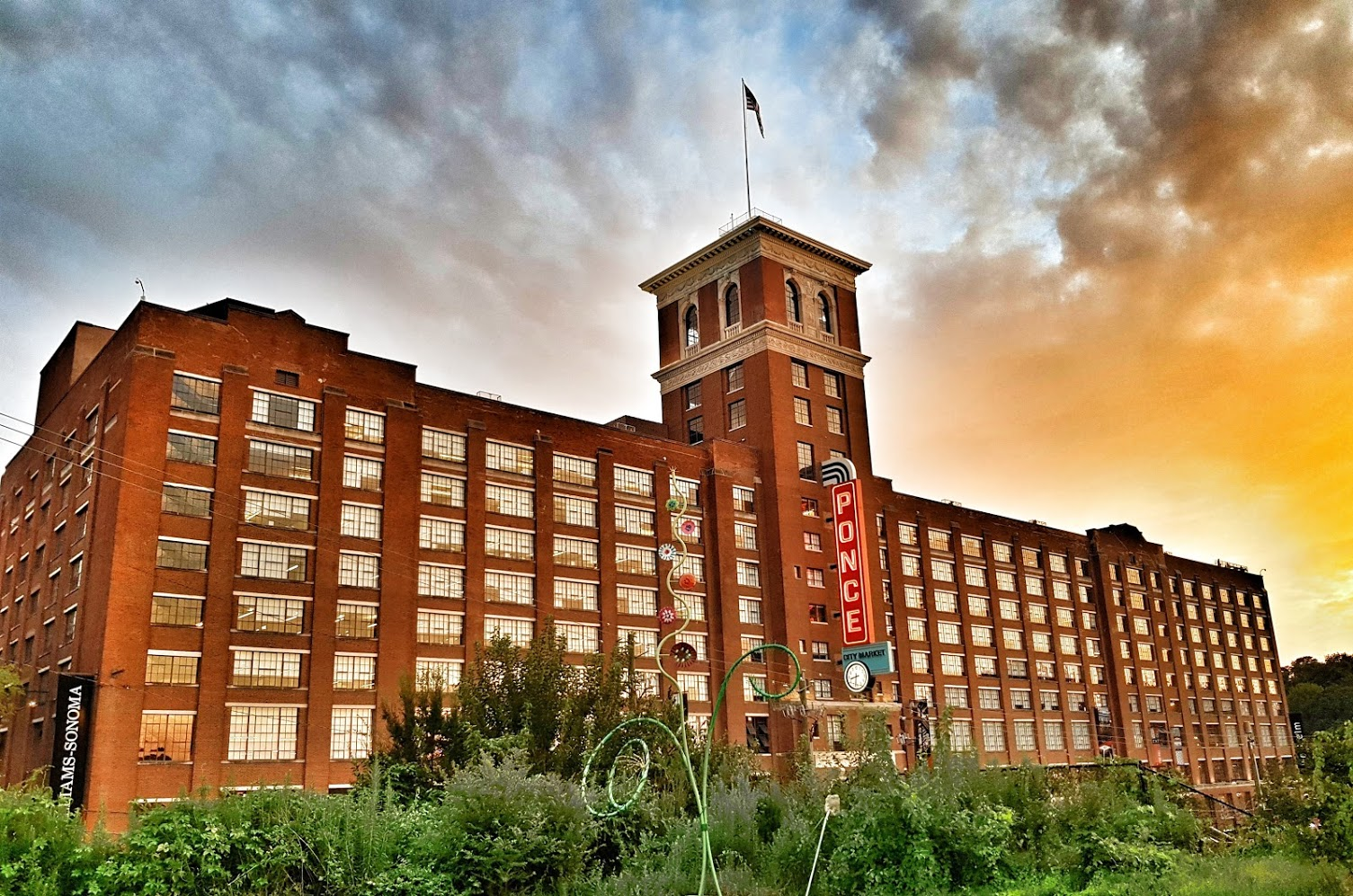
- Ponce City Market
- Nickname: O4W
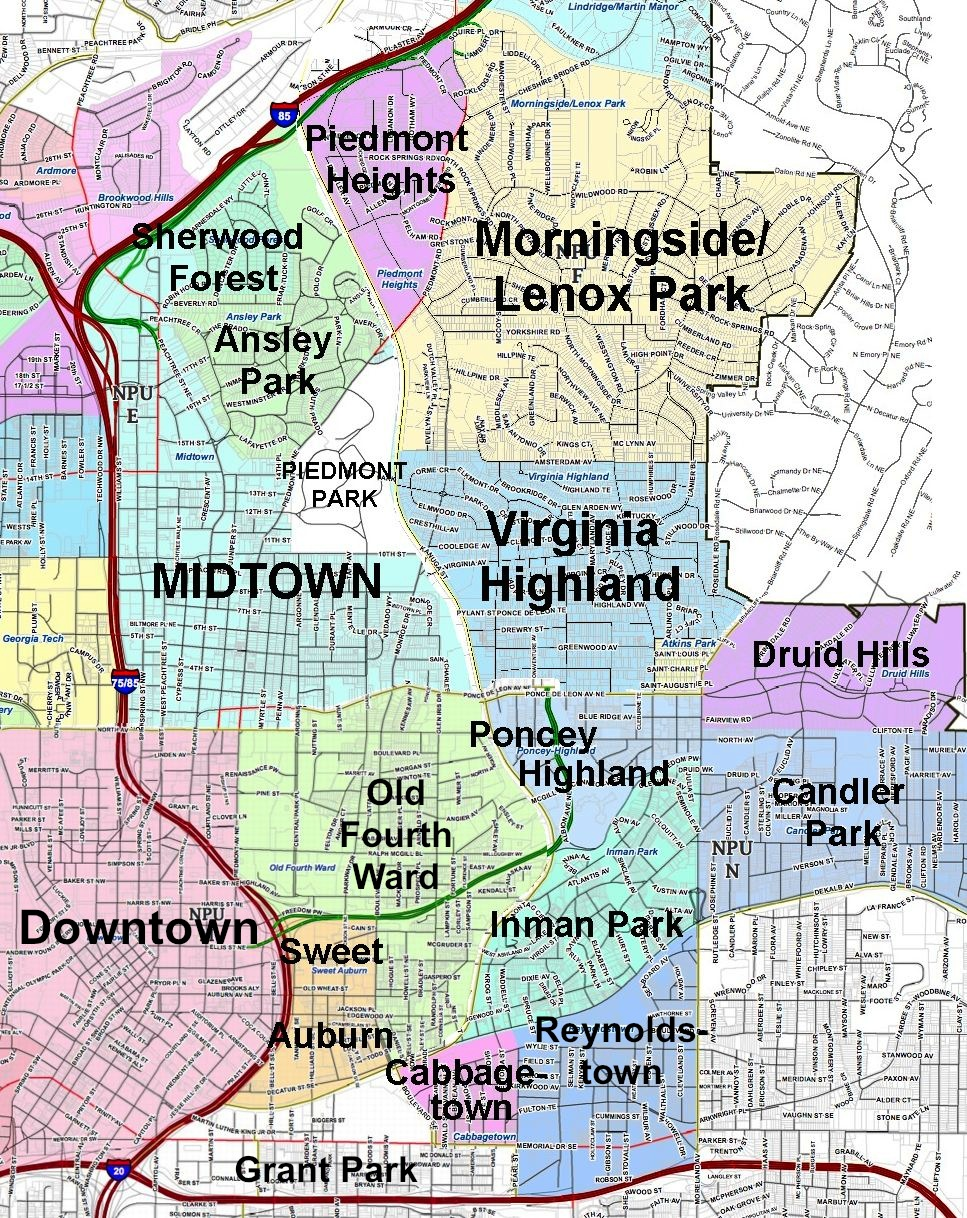
- Old Fourth Ward and Eastside neighborhoods
- Coordinates: 33.766°N 84.372°W
- Country: United States
- State: Georgia
- County: Fulton County
- City: City of Atlanta
- NPU: M

Population (2010)
  - Total: 10,505
- Source: 2010 U.S. census figures as tabulated by WalkScore
- Website: O4W Business Association

The Old Fourth Ward, often abbreviated O4W, is a historic intown neighborhood on the eastside of Atlanta, Georgia, United States. The neighborhood is best known as the location of the Martin Luther King Jr. historic site.

== Geography ==
The Old Fourth Ward's borders:

- West: Piedmont Avenue, across which is Downtown Atlanta
- East: the BeltLine, across which are Poncey–Highland and Inman Park
- North: Ponce de Leon Avenue, across which is Midtown Atlanta
- South: MARTA Green Line and Oakland Cemetery, across which are Grant Park and Cabbagetown

The exception is the area west of Boulevard and south of Freedom Parkway which, although historically part of Atlanta's Fourth Ward (see Atlanta annexations and wards), is considered a separate recognized neighborhood called Sweet Auburn.

The neighborhood can be divided into three areas, with Freedom Parkway and Boulevard serving as dividing lines.

=== Northeast ===
The area north of Freedom Parkway and east of Boulevard is home to the 2.1 million sq. ft. Ponce City Market, a mixed-use development, and Historic Fourth Ward Park, a product of the BeltLine project. In the 2010s, many new multi-family developments have been built bordering the park, including BOHO4W, AMLI Ponce Park, and 755 North. The BeltLine Eastside Trail is the eastern border of this area.

=== Northwest ===
The area west of Boulevard and north of Freedom Parkway was once called Bedford Pine, and, prior to the 1960s, it was a slum called Buttermilk Bottom. In the 1960s, slum housing gave way to massive urban renewal and the construction of large projects, such as the Atlanta Civic Center, the Georgia Power headquarters, and public housing projects. Bedford Pine was officially absorbed into the Old Fourth Ward neighborhood, whose boundaries officially extend west to Piedmont Avenue.

=== Boulevard ===
Boulevard itself, in the 1890s described as "one of the most desirable residence streets in the city," has for decades been notorious citywide as a center of crime and drug activity, as well as the highest concentration of Section 8 housing in the Southeastern United States. However, in January 2012, City Councilman Kwanza Hall revealed a seven-point "Year of Boulevard" strategy to revitalize the corridor.

=== Southeast ===
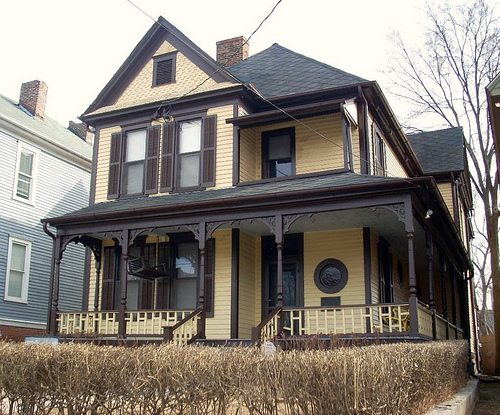
Martin Luther King, Jr.'s boyhood home

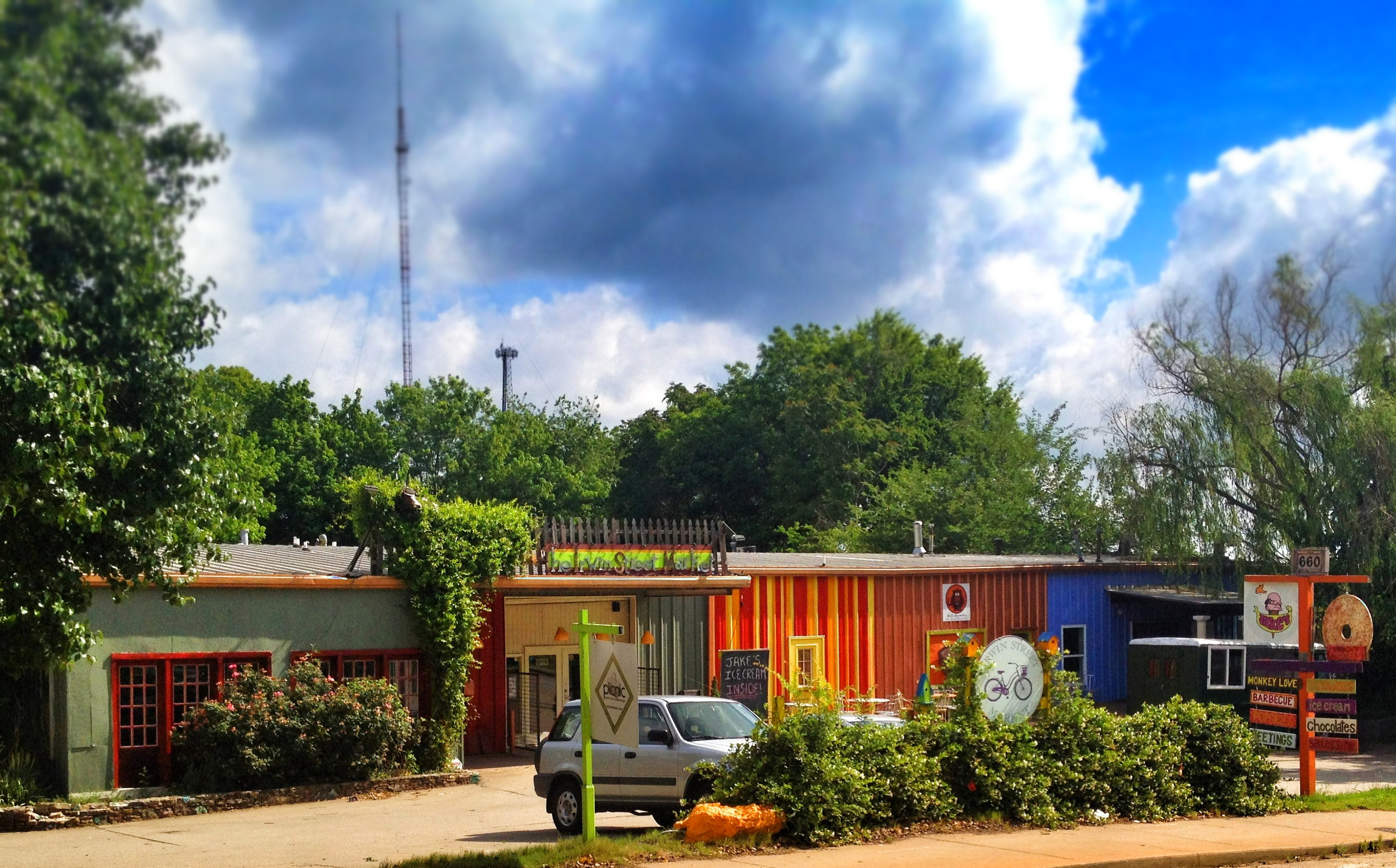
Colorful Irwin Street Market with the WSB-TV tower rising behind it

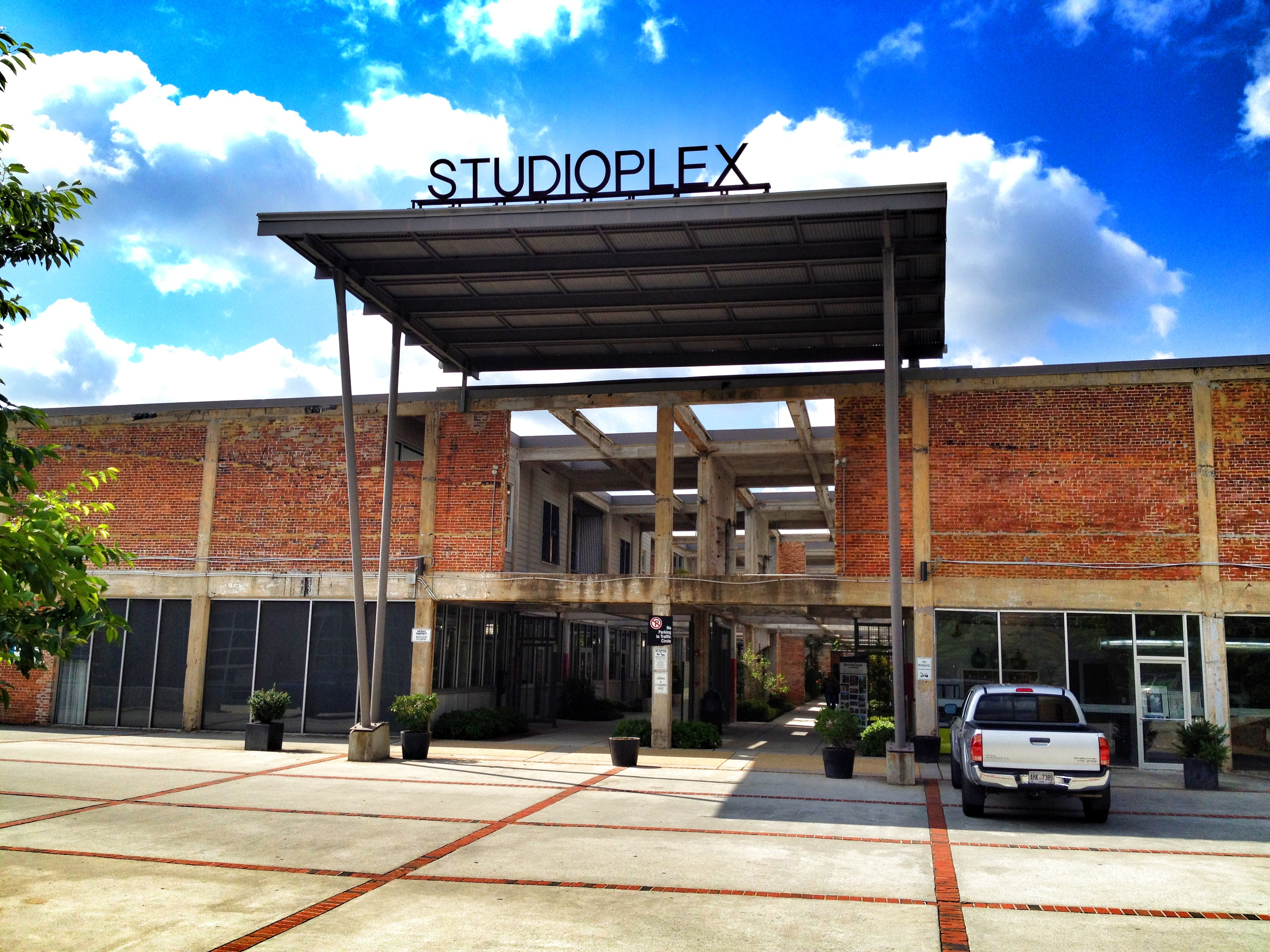
Studioplex, one of many converted industrial spaces in the Ward along and near the BeltLine

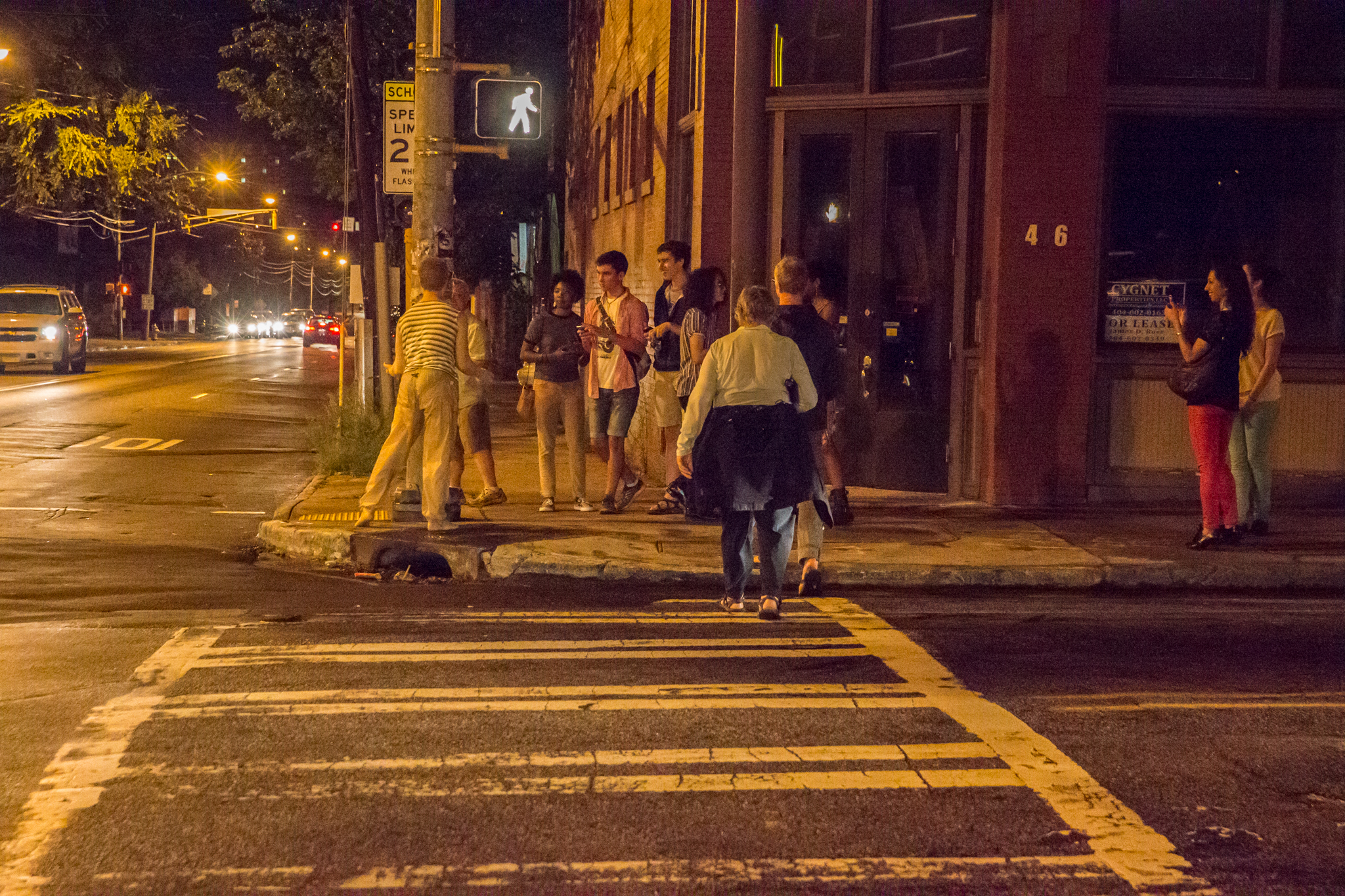
Edgewood Avenue near Boulevard at night

The largest concentration of single family homes are found south of Freedom Parkway, especially south of Irwin Street, and the area is perhaps the most eclectic part of O4W. Auburn Avenue and Old Wheat Streets are in character extensions of the historic African-American business and residential district, Sweet Auburn, and of the Martin Luther King Jr. National Historic Site.

The Ward's entertainment options in the southeast section of the neighborhood are primarily on Edgewood Avenue and Decatur Street, where there is a concentration of bars and restaurants.

The eastern border is the BeltLine Eastside Trail, lined with repurposed industrial buildings such as Studioplex, now used for residential and retail use.

== History ==
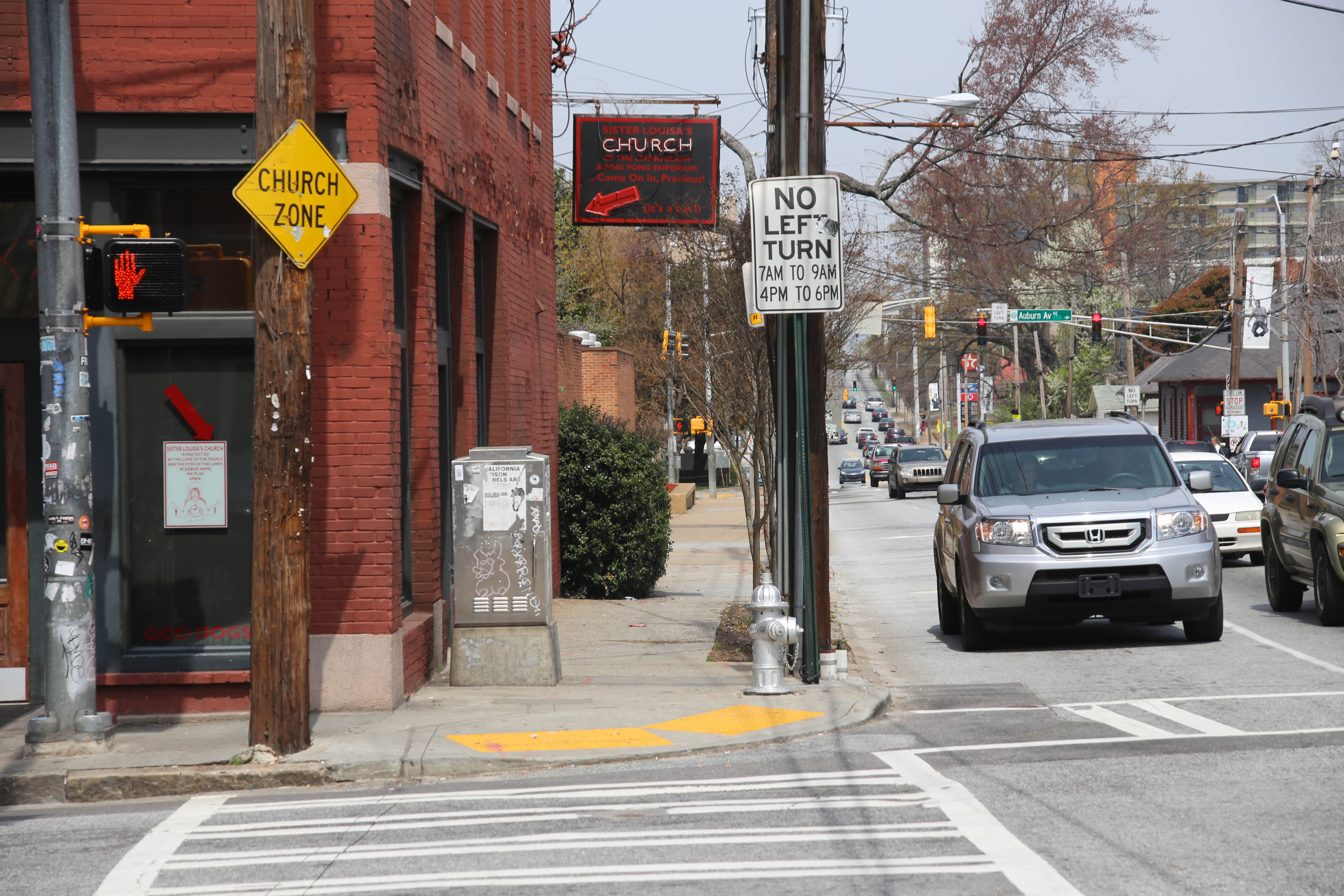
Edgewood Avenue near Boulevard and "Church" bar

What is now the Old Fourth Ward is a smaller version of the historic Fourth Ward political area in place until the 1950s when the city changed to a district system. It is one of the oldest sections of the city, with the westernmost blocks developing soon after the Civil War. Different parts of the ward were, at different times, considered white, black, or mixed-race areas. From the 1910s onward, as Atlanta politicians moved to institutionalize racially segregated residential areas, Old Fourth Ward continued as a patchwork of whites living as close neighbors with blacks.

The Ward was home to the spectrum of races but also socioeconomic classes: the foremost thoroughfare in today's Old Fourth Ward, Boulevard, was in the 1890s called one of the most desirable residential streets in the city, even as the Buttermilk Bottom slum festered less than half a mile west. However, after the Great Atlanta fire of 1917, Boulevard's grand houses were destroyed and replaced by brick apartment buildings.

As with most of Intown Atlanta, the Old Fourth Ward declined precipitously during the 1950s and 1960s as wealthier residents moved further out from central neighborhoods. Streets, houses and businesses that sat upon the land that is now Freedom Parkway were also razed to make way for a freeway that was never built. What was once a consistent and dense grid pattern of streets is now difficult to recognize, with Freedom Parkway occupying what had once been multiple city blocks.

Boulevard in particular witnessed a steady decline. The road was lined with apartment buildings constructed after the Great Atlanta fire of 1917, most of which were section 8 housing. Boulevard became infamous throughout Atlanta and beyond as a haven for blight, littering, drug activity, homeless encampments, prostitution, and violent gangs, a reputation that endured into the 2010s, despite revitalization efforts growing in the area. However, as more Section 8 housing was demolished and investors moved into the neighborhood, the area's amenities, demand, reputation, public schools, and public safety significantly improved.

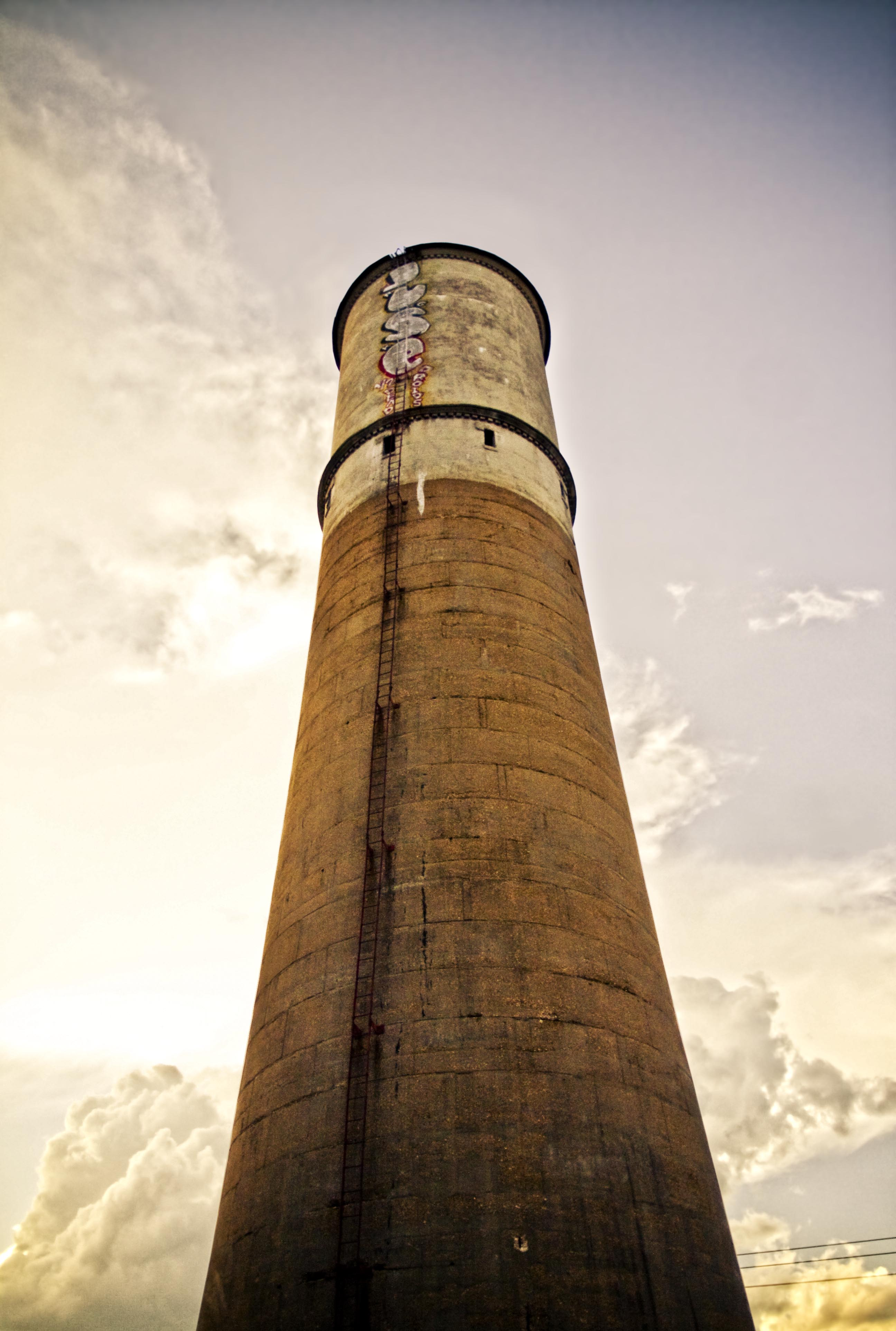
The Old Fourth Ward water tower

Gentrification of the Old Fourth Ward began in the 1980s, and continued at a more rapid pace since the 2000s. New apartment and condo complexes with ground-floor retail sprung up, particularly along the BeltLine, Ponce de Leon Avenue, North Avenue, Highland Avenue, and Boulevard. The area, which was majority Black for many decades, has seen a huge influx of diversity in recent decades. As of December 2025, Niche estimated Old Fourth Ward is 53% White, 33% Black, 5% Hispanic, 4% Asian, and 3% Other/Multi-Racial.

== Trails and parks ==
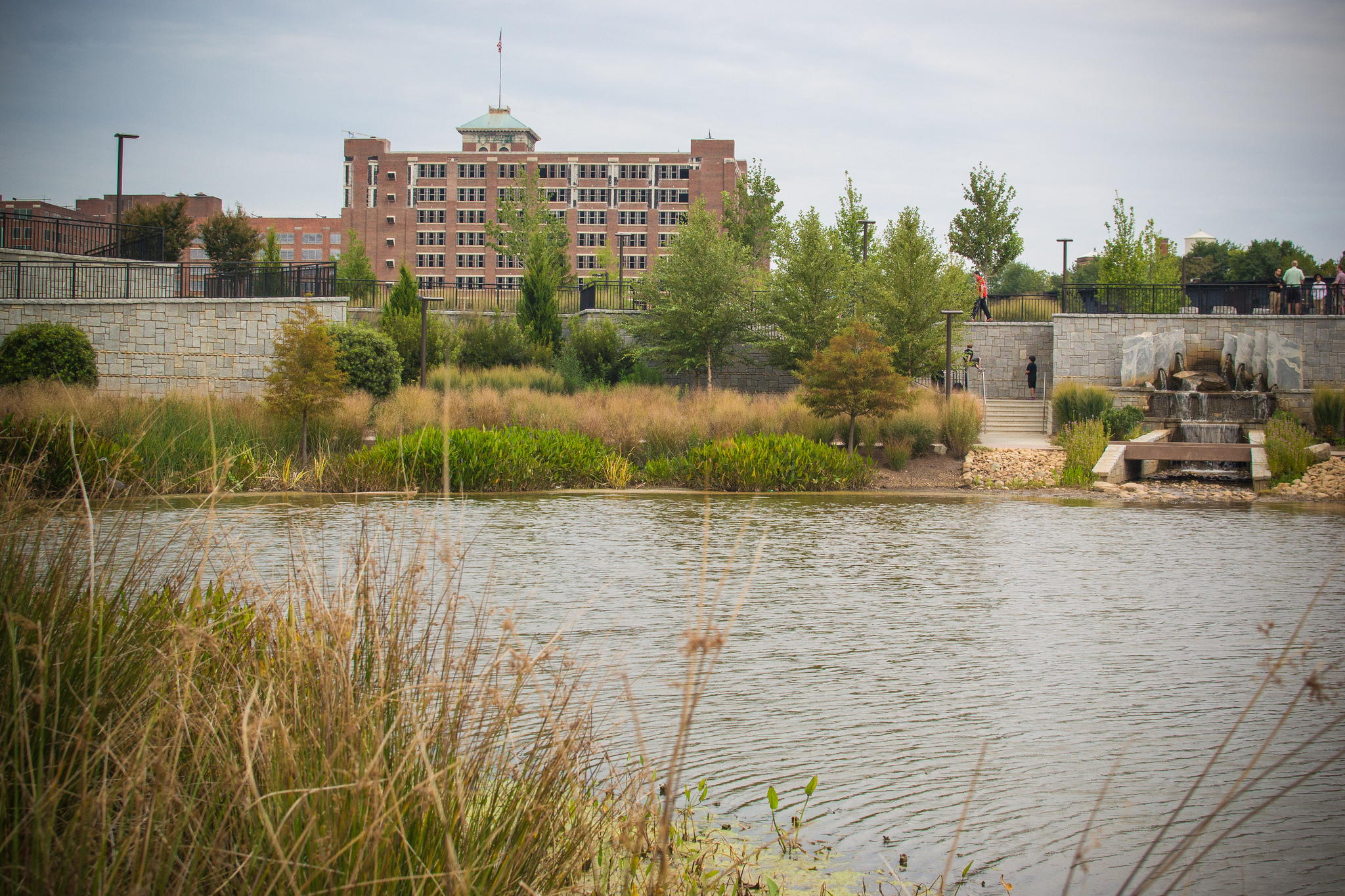
Historic Fourth Ward Park, 2012

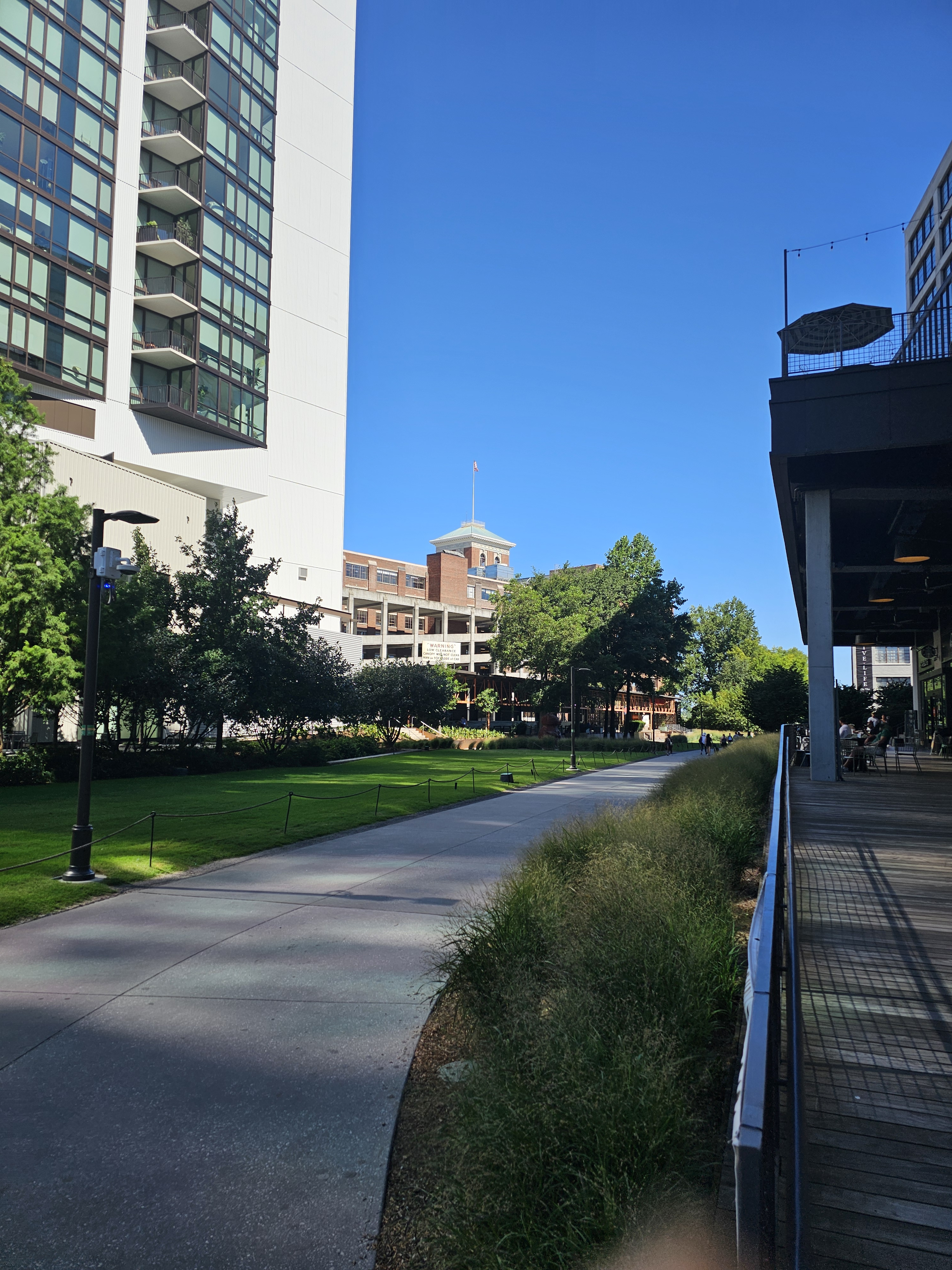
BeltLine Eastside Trail, 2025

Two of the city's iconic walking and biking trails intersect in the neighborhood:

- BeltLine Eastside Trail
- Freedom Parkway park and trail

Historic Fourth Ward Park and Skate Park opened in phases starting in 2011 and includes an attractive retention pond. The area around the park has since mushroomed with large apartment buildings.

Other parks include:

- Central Park
- Renaissance Park and Dog Park
- Selena Butler Park

== Culture ==
The Old Fourth Ward is one of Atlanta's best neighborhoods for viewing street art. Some of the best locations to view street art in the Old Fourth Ward include Decatur St., Edgewood Ave. and on and around the Eastside Trail of the Atlanta Beltline. The Outerspace Project is responsible for bringing many works of street art to the Old Fourth Ward. Several examples of street art in the Old Fourth Ward are found on the Atlanta Street Art Map.

== Other points of interest ==
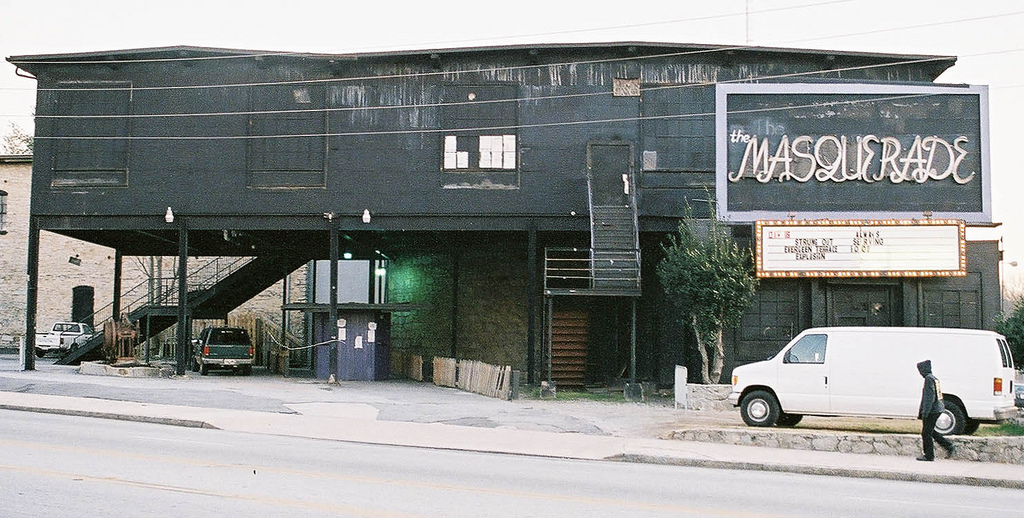
The DuPre Excelsior Mill

- Ponce City Market
- Edgewood Avenue around Boulevard has become a bar and restaurant district after decades of neglect, prior to 2013 having been known for "drug traffic, petty crime, and homeless hideaways". Sister Louisa's Church of the Living Room and Ping Pong Emporium, a bar, is a landmark here.
- Industrial architecture along the BeltLine Eastside Trail, including the DuPre Excelsior Mill and National NuGrape Company lofts
- part of the Martin Luther King Jr. National Historic Site, including King's Birth Home
- Atlanta Civic Center
- Edward C. Peters House
- Homage to King sculpture
- WSB-TV tower
- The Carter Center borders the neighborhood
- The Jackson Street Bridge is one of Atlanta's most iconic landmarks for photos

== Transportation ==
The MARTA Green Line runs east–west at the south end of the neighborhood, although there is no station in O4W itself. King Memorial station is to the west and Inman Park / Reynoldstown station is to the east. The Atlanta Streetcar line starts just west of the neighborhood. Several MARTA bus lines serve the neighborhood. Relay provides bike share.
