= Rio Shopping Center =

Shopping center in Atlanta, Georgia, US

Coordinates: 33.7706°N 84.3813°W

The Rio Shopping Center was a 120,000-square-foot (11,000 m^{2}) open-air shopping center in Atlanta. It was located at the southeast corner of Piedmont Avenue and North Avenue in the northwesternmost part of what is now the Old Fourth Ward, at its border of SoNo and Midtown Atlanta. It was designed by Arquitectonica in postmodern style, landscaped by Martha Schwartz and opened in the Fall of 1988. It was the first free-standing complex of its kind to be built in central Atlanta in more than twenty years.

== Architecture and features ==
The architectural style was postmodern incorporating whimsical (also called kitsch or pop art) elements such as a fountain with gold colored frog sculptures. The Atlanta Journal-Constitution criticized what it termed Arquitectonica's "compromises". Rio had a 25-screen video wall playing a variety of video, from television shows to a specially commissioned site-specific artwork. The custom design of the video wall, the installation and the programming was completed by Visioneering® International, Inc. Stores and services included Benetton, Camp Beverly Hills, Enrico's, High Country Outfitters, Carmine's, Coyote Cafe, Patio Hut Cafe, Wolf Camera, Tic-Tac-Toe T-shirts and The Crab House.

== Awards ==
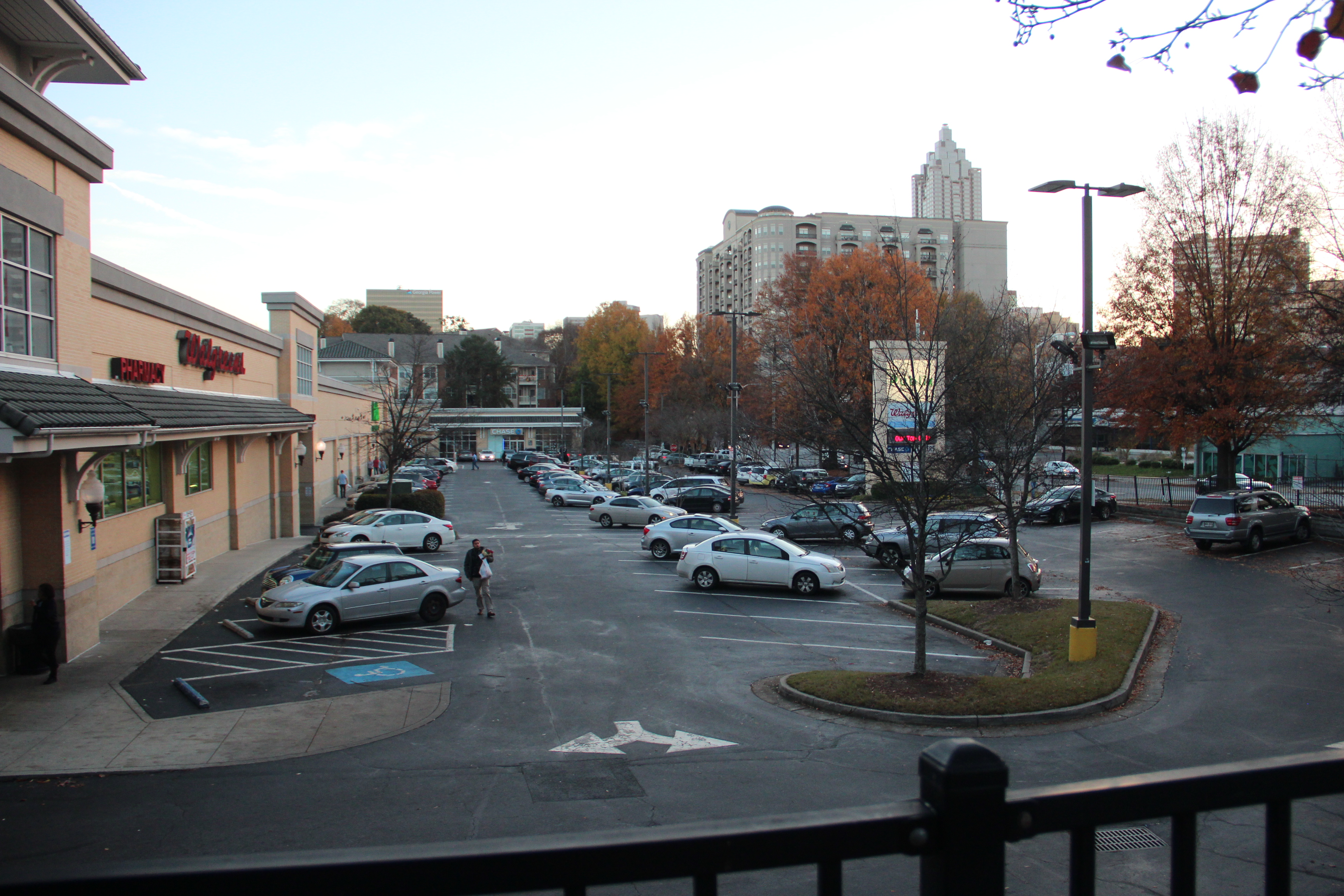
Rio Shopping Center site in 2018

Rio was awarded "The Best New Development - Retail" award by the Atlanta Business Chronicle. Business Week selected Rio for "The Best of Architecture" award in 1988 and the Fulton County Developers Award was presented to Rio for best new retail project, 1988.

Despite its awards, the center was not successful in attracting customers and closed about a decade after opening. In 2002, Creative Loafing looked back on Rio, stating:

"The golden frogs were funky, the fountain was cool, the wall of TVs was eye-catching, but Rio -- hailed as an architectural prize when it debuted in 1989 at the corner of Piedmont and North -- was just too quirky and Gap-free to catch on with conservative Southerners, despite its intown location."

The site now contains a strip mall with a Walgreens pharmacy and 52,400-square-foot (4,870 m^{2}) Publix supermarket dedicated in 2001 as well as the Savannah Midtown apartment complex.
