= Rufus M. Rose =

American physician

Dr. Rufus M. Rose, circa 1870s

Rufus Mathewson Rose (born May 17, 1836, in New London, Connecticut; died July 21, 1910, in Atlanta, Georgia), was an American businessman. After growing up and receiving a primary and secondary education in that state, he moved to New York City, where he practiced as a druggist, and then on to Long Island, where he worked in a sailors' hospital.

Before the start of the American Civil War, Rose had studied medicine, received a diploma and moved to Hawkinsville, Georgia. When the war broke out in 1861, Rose joined the Confederate Army's Tenth Georgia Regiment as a foot soldier, but was quickly reassigned to Williamsburg, Virginia, where he worked in the army's medical department. Due to a personal injury, Rose was honorably discharged in December 1861, but his services in creating medicines for the Confederate army continued until just before the end of the war.

After the war, Rose moved to Atlanta. In 1867, he founded the R. M. Rose Co. Distillery, also known as the Mountain Spring Distillery, in Vinings, Georgia, a then-small community twelve miles north of Atlanta. He sold his corn and rye whiskies to the public from retail outlets he owned and operated in Atlanta.

According to some accounts, his company established the whiskey brand Four Roses in 1888, likely named in honor of him, his brother Origen, and their two sons. The brand is still produced, and was the top selling brand of Bourbon in the United States in the 1930s, 1940s and 1950s. The brand is currently owned by the Kirin Brewery Company of Japan and produced at the Four Roses distillery in Lawrenceburg, Kentucky. However, the actual origin of the Four Roses brand is not well established, and current brand owners do not mention Rufus M. Rose in their version of its history.

In addition to selling liquor, Rose was the owner of a large real estate business known as the Rose Investment Company.

Rose died of heart failure on July 21, 1910, in his Victorian mansion – the Rufus M. Rose House – which still stands on Peachtree Street in the SoNo district of Atlanta. His remains are interred in the Rose mausoleum at Oakland Cemetery.
