= Music Midtown =

Annual music festival in Atlanta, Georgia, United States

Coordinates: 33°47′10″N 84°22′24″W

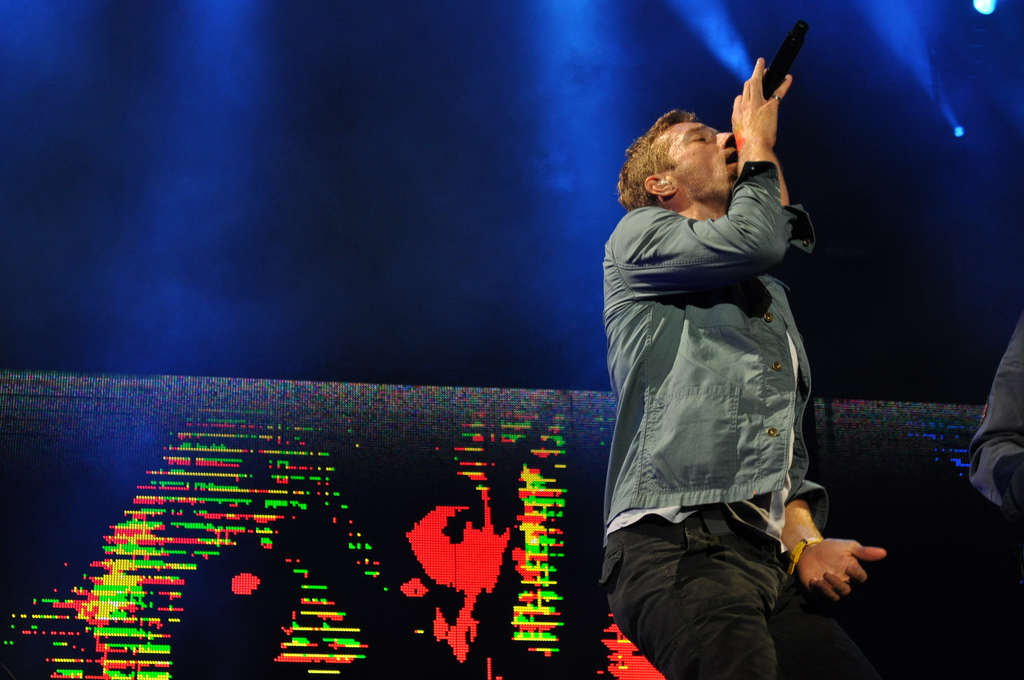
- Coldplay at Music Midtown, 2011
- Frequency: Annual
- Locations: Undeveloped Land in Midtown at 10th and Peachtree, Atlanta (1994–1998); Area Around Centennial Olympic Park, Atlanta (1999) Central Park, Atlanta (2000-2005); Piedmont Park, Atlanta (2011–2024
- Years active: 1994–2005, 2011–2021, 2023
- Inaugurated: May 13, 1994; 32 years ago
- Most recent: September 15–17, 2023
- Next event: On hiatus as of May 8, 2024
- Website: musicmidtown.com

Music Midtown is a large music festival held in Atlanta, Georgia, annually from 1994 to 2005, after which it returned in 2011 following a six-year hiatus. The festival ran consecutively from 2011-2019 with a cancellation in 2020 due to the COVID-19 pandemic. The festival returned briefly in 2021, before a cancellation in 2022. In May 2023, it was announced that Music Midtown would return. In May 2024, it was announced that the festival would be going on a hiatus for that year. No new festival dates have been announced since. The festival runs for one weekend each year, typically in September. The event drew in excess of 300,000 attendees per year during its peak years.

The festival began as a two-day event with three stages, and later grew to a three-day event with six main stages. Each of these stages were typically sponsored by a local Atlanta radio station and were used to present dozens of bands playing a wide variety of musical genres. Due to a decline in attendance and rising expenses after the 2005 festival, promoters placed the festival on hiatus in 2006.

In 2011, the festival returned as a one-day event, and expanded to a two-day format the following year. On August 1, 2022 the festival was cancelled due to Georgia gun laws preventing organizers from banning firearms at the event, which was held in a public park. Upon the return of the festival in 2023, it was announced the event would now take place over 3-days and occurred from September 15–17, 2023. On May 8, 2024, the official festival instagram account posted a statement saying that the festival would not return in 2024, but to stay tuned for future updates. The festival currently has not had any scheduled dates since 2023.

== History ==
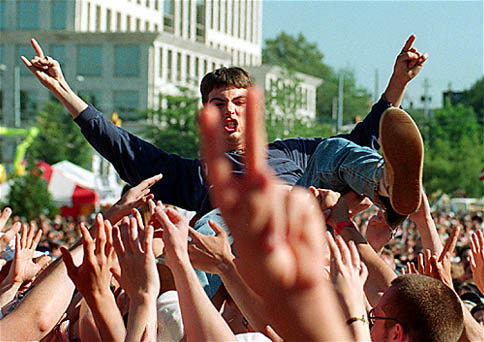
Crowdsurfer at Music Midtown 1997

=== Origins ===
The festival was conceived by Atlanta-based music promoters Alex Cooley, Peter Conlon and Alex Hoffman who sought to create an event similar to the New Orleans Jazz & Heritage Festival. The intent was to present a wide variety of music that both men had come to enjoy during their careers in the music industry.

In 1994, the festival launched on a parcel of undeveloped land at Peachtree St. and Tenth St. in the heart of Midtown's business district. After a few years at this site, the festival was forced to move to make way for the construction of the new Federal Reserve Bank of Atlanta. The new festival site chosen was in downtown just north of Centennial Olympic Park and consisted mainly of closed-off streets and surface parking lots which made for a hot and somewhat unpleasant experience for daytime concert-goers. This site is now home to the Georgia Aquarium and the World of Coca-Cola museum. This led to a brief stay of two years after which the festival moved to the 42 acre (170,000 m^{2}) location adjacent to the Atlanta Civic Center and now closed SciTrek. After finding this new home, the festival grew dramatically and attracted around 300,000 attendees during its peak years.

=== Changes, 2005, and decline ===
2005 Music Midtown logo

In 2000, the festival featured its largest show to date. They increased their stage amount to six and featured over 130 bands. Although independent promoters when the festival was created, Cooley and Conlon sold their company, Concert/Southern Promotions, to Clear Channel Communications' subsidiary SFX Entertainment in 1998. In November 2004, Alex Cooley was released by Clear Channel Entertainment in part due to his unsuccessful assimilation into the corporate culture. His age and health problems (diabetes) prevented him from working full-time which also played a role.

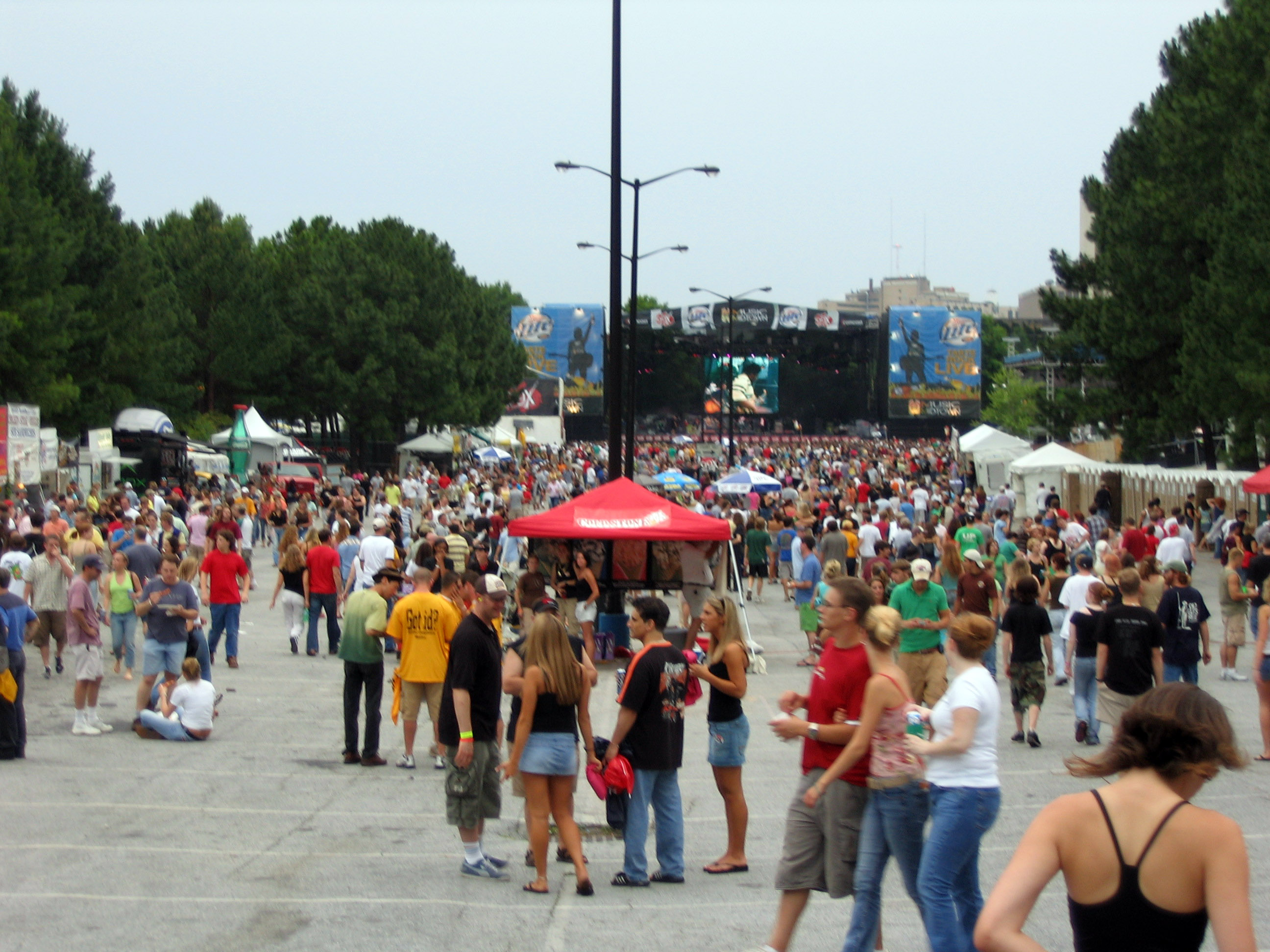
Crowd at Music Midtown 2005

Traditionally on the first weekend in May, the 2005 festival was moved to June 10–12. This was supposedly done for better weather, although this ended up being counterproductive, as it put the festival into even more heat and humidity and at a greater risk for thunderstorms with dangerous lightning. Most of the 2005 festival was rained on by remnants of Tropical Storm Arlene, repeating many of the May rains it was rescheduled to avoid. Special outdoor tiles were put down in front of the stages to protect the grass and keep it from turning to mud.

The 2005 festival also doubled the talent budget and raised 3-day ticket prices from $45 to $75. Conlon cited media reports of potential traffic problems from Music Midtown and the concurrent Vibe MusicFest at the Georgia Dome as "killing" advance ticket sales in the weeks before the event. Others believe that the higher ticket prices may have exceeded the affordability of younger concert-goers. The slated 2005 dates were also concurrent with the increasingly popular Bonnaroo music and arts festival in neighboring Tennessee, which may have affected both attendance and artist booking.

=== Hiatus and resurrection ===
On January 5, 2006, Conlon announced that there would be no Music Midtown in 2006 due to the growing expenses of the festival in its current form and location. Although Conlon left open the possibility of a return at a different location in the future, this ultimately left Music Midtown in limbo and on hiatus through 2010.

On July 6, 2011, Mayor Kasim Reed and Conlon announced that the festival would return for 2011 as a one-day event on September 24, 2011, at Piedmont Park. Ticket prices for the event were $55, with two stages and The Black Keys and Coldplay headlining. Additional acts included Cage the Elephant, Manchester Orchestra, Young the Giant, The Joy Formidable and others.

On September 21, 2011, Conlon said due to the success of advance ticket sales for 2011, he was already planning for a 2012 version of the festival. "Next year will definitely be two days, a little more diverse," he said. "I felt that getting something [produced] this year was important. It's gotten people focused again. But I'll start thinking about next year the week after this one. It takes a year to plan these things right." Following the event, local media estimated attendance at 40,000.

In 2015, a fourth stage was added to the summer festival. This year they spent almost in $18 million in production. They also donated $100,000 to the Piedmont Park Conservancy. According to the research center at the Nashville Area Chamber of Commerce, attendee spending brings over $11 million of income to Atlanta.

In 2016, the creators decided to change the format of the festival. In previous years, the shows took place on Friday and Saturday. The new format moved the shows to Saturday and Sunday due to the large amount of traffic from the neighboring Henry W. Grady High School and the rush hour time period posing a risk.

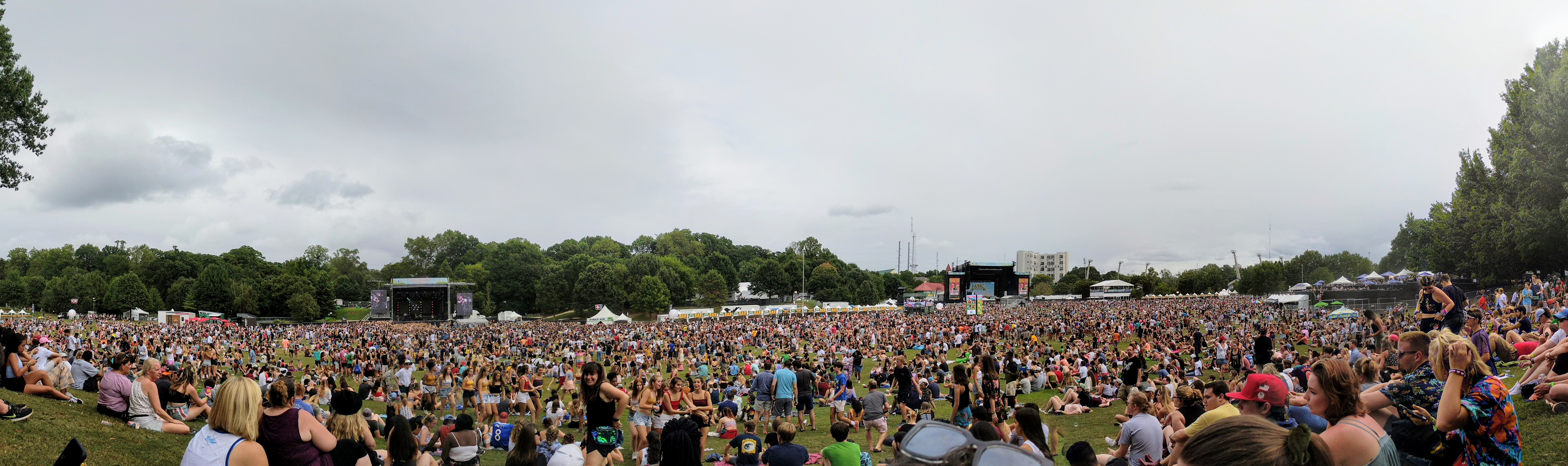
Panoramic view of The Meadow at Piedmont Park during Music Midtown 2018.

== Lineups ==
=== 1994 lineup ===
Friday, May 13, 1994 - Sunday May 15, 1994

Béla Fleck and the Flecktones, Buddy Guy, Eddie Money, Joan Baez, Saffire — The Uppity Blues Women, Sam Phillips, Subsonics, Al Green, Cigar Store Indians, James Brown, Jason & the Scorchers, Jimmie Dale Gilmore, Murray Attaway, Ottoman Empire, The Charlatans, The Derek Trucks Band, The Knack, Uncle Green, WILD WEST Picture Show, Cowboy Mouth, Cracker, Dash Rip Rock, Five-Eight, James

=== 1995 lineup ===
Friday, May 12, 1995 - Sunday May 14, 1995

Bush, Gov't Mule, Little Feat, The Blind Boys of Alabama, Our Lady Peace, Collective Soul, Edwin McCain, Chris Duarte, God Street Wine, The Screamin' Cheetah Wheelies, The Stone Roses, The BoDeans, Cake, Matthew Sweet, Everything, The Band, NRBQ, Buckwheat Zydeco, Adam Ant, The Bottle Rockets, Magnapop, Delbert McClinton, Josh Joplin Group, Rebirth Brass Band, Village People, Cigar Store Indians, Bone Pony, Five Chinese Brothers, Francine Reed, Gracie Moon, The Kentucky Headhunters, Matthew Kahler, Shawn Mullins, Tinsley Ellis, Sounds of Blackness, Supreme Court

=== 1996 lineup ===
Friday, May 3, 1996 - Sunday May 5, 1996 - One Day Pass: $17; Weekend Pass: $27.00

3 lb. Thrill, 3 Lost Souls, Aimee Mann, Adrian Legg, Anti Heros, Anders Osborne, Becky Sharp, Bela Fleck & the Flecktones, Big Fish Ensemble, Bill Morrissey, The Black Crowes, Bob Dylan, The Bobs, Bone Pony, The Bottlerockets, Brother Cane, Buddy Guy Big Band, Cake, Catfish Jenkins, Chambers Brothers, Chief Seattle, Clay Harper & The Rhythm Tyrants, Cornershop, Cracker, Dallas County Line, Dash Rip Rock, Dirty Dozen, Doublewide, Dry County, Edwin McCain, Evan & Jaron, Fiji Mariners, Fishbone, Fleming & John, For Squirrels, Francine Reed, Fred Schneider, Geno Delafose & French Rockin' Boogie, Goose Creek Symphony, Gracie Moon, Gren, Groundscore, Gurufish, Hip Heavy Lip, Howard Jones, HoHum, Ian Moore, Jake, Jan Smith, Joan Baez, Joe Ely, Joe Satriani, John Mayall & the Bluesbreakers, John Wesley Harding, Johnny Hyde Quartet, Josh Joplin Band, Kenny Wayne Shepherd, Kool & The Gang, Larry McCray, Law of Nature, League of Decency, Leftover Salmon, Lift, Lisa Loeb, Lil Red Rocket, Lonesome Jones, Loudflower, Lounge Flounders, Luther Allison, Mary Fortune Express, Memory Dean, Moonwater, Morris Day & The Time, Norman Blake, NRBQ, Ohio Players, One Without, Poe, Ride the Wood, The Roches, Robben Ford & The Blue Line, Root 88, Ruby, Saffire – The Uppity Blues Women, Schtum, Shadowcaste, Shawn Colvin, Sightseers, Sister Hazel, Snapdragon, Sparklehorse, Squirrel Nut Zippers, Steel Pulse, Stir, The Stowes, Super X13, Syd Straw, Tabu Ley Rochereau, Tender Idols, This Living Hand, Toadies, Umajets, Uncle Mark Reynolds, Urban Shakedancers, Vertical Horizon, Wailing Souls, Wanderlust, Zachary Richard

KIDS STAGE: Planet Earth Inc. Lee Bryan's Premier Puppets, Juggling Dou Dan Thurman & Philip Solomon, Joanie Bartels from the Disney Channel, Mario "The Laff Master", Rick Hubbard & His All Star Kazoo Band, Plus Activity areas with arts & crafts, games and more.

=== 1997 lineup ===
May 2, 1997 - May 4, 1997 - Weekend Pass: $27.00

Number 1 Family Mover, 3 Lost Souls, 702, Acoustic Workshop, Alicia Bridges, Al Jarreau, Angie Aparo, Automatic, B Rock & The Bizz, Barenaked Ladies, BeauSoleil, Ben Folds Five, Better Than Ezra, Billy pilgrim, Boobytrap, The Boo Radleys, Cake, Cheap Trick, Christion, Cindy Lee Berryhill, Continentals, Cool For August, Cowboy Envy, Cowboy Mouth, Cravin' Melon, Dash Rip Rock, David Ryan Harris, Dayroom, Delbert McClinton, Dinosaur Jr., Edwin McCain, Kevn Kinney & Warren Haynes (together in a rare acoustic appearance), Emmet Swimming, Eric Johnson, Expanding Man, Fabulous Thunderbirds, Fernando Aragon, File´, Five-Eight, Fleming & John, The Floyds, Francine Reed, Fuel, funky Meters, Geno Delafose & French Rockin Boogie, George Clinton & The P Funk Allstars, Gibb Droll, Glass Candle Grenade, Gov’t Mule, Gravy, Hazel Virtue, The Hazies, Hip Heavy Lip, Hobex, Jonny Lang, Johnny Hyde Quartet, Jonatha Brooke, Jump Little Children, K's Choice, Kelly Hogan & Lee Jeffrey, Leroy Jones, Local H, Lonesome Jones, Lonnie Brooks, Los Lobos, Los Straitjackets, Madfly, Michelle Malone, Mishap, Modern English, Monica, Muse, Musique, Neilson Hubbard, The Nields, Pascal Bokar, Patty Griffin, People Who Must, Radiant City, Reuben Anderson, Rockapella, Root Doctors, Royal Crown Revue, Santana, Saw Doctors, Seek, Sevendust, Shinehead, Shock Lobo, Silverchair, Sister Hazel, Six Ways To Sunday, Skirt, Slim Fatz & Uprighteous, Sons of the San Joaquin, Soul Miners Daughter, Sounds of Blackness, Squirrel Nut Zippers, Steve Miller Band, Stir, String Cheese Incident, Taj Mahal & The Phantom Blues Band, Tender Idols, treehouse, Trinket, Velmer Watkins & The Angelic Community Choir, Vigilantes Of Love, Wallflowers, War, Wild West Picture Show, Young Gary, ZZ Top

=== 1998 lineup ===
May 1, 1998 - May 3, 1998 - Ticket Price $30

2 Skinnee J's (5/1), A Flock of Seagulls (5/3), Agents of Good Roots (5/3), Alana Davis (5/2), Alejandro Esoveda (5/3), Al's Not Well (5/2), Andy Offutt Irwin (5/1), Anne Murray (5/3), Another Man Down (5/3), Anson Funderburgh (5/3), Athenaeum (5/3), Austin Lounge Lizards (5/2), The Backsliders (5/2), Bela Fleck & The Flecktones (5/3), Beth Wood (5/3), Big Wreck (5/3), Billionaire (5/2), Bio Ritmo (5/1), Blue Mountain (5/1), Booker T & The MG's (5/3), Charlie Mars Band (5/2), Chubby Carrier & the Bayou Swamp Band (5/2), Cracker (5/2), Creedence Clearwater Revisted (5/3), David Byrne (5/2), Day By the River (5/3), Dayroom (5/2), Dee Snider's S.M.F's (5/2), Dee Dee Bridgewater (5/2), Derek Trucks Band (5/1), Destiny's Child (5/2), Dixie Hummingbirds (5/3), drivin’ n’ cryin’ (5/2), Duke Ellington Orchestra (5/2), Econoline Crush (5/3), Emm Gryner (5/1), Etta James (5/3), Evan & Jaron (5/2) Eve 6 (5/1), Fastball (5/2), Foo Fighters (5/2), Francine Reed (5/3) Freddy Jones Band (5/2) Fuel (5/2), Garrison Starr (5/1), The Gary Steer Ensemble (5/2), God Lives Underwater (5/2), Goodie Mob (5/1), Gov’t Mule (5/2), Gra’ (5/3), Gracie Moon (5/2)Haynes, McCain, Kinney (5/3), Henry Murphy & the son's & brother's band (5/3), The Iguanas (5/1), Indigo Girls (5/1), Isaac Curry (5/1), Jagged Edge (5/2), Jimmie Dale Gilmore (5/2), Jolene (5/1), Josh Joplin Band (5/2), Juggling Sons (5/1), June Victory & The Bayou Renegades (5/2), Jupiter Coyote (5/2), Keb’ Mo’ (5/3), Kenny Wayne Shepherd (5/2), King Slender (5/1), Kingsized (5/3), Koko Taylor (5/2), Kool & The Gang featuring JT Taylor(5/2), La Bottine Souriante (5/2), Letters To Cleo (5/3), Little Jack Melody & His Young Turks (5/2), Loud American Tourists (5/2), Lysette (5/1), Marvelous 3 (5/2), Mavis Staples (5/3), Memory Dean (5/1), Michelle Penn (5/2), The Mike Karp Band (5/3), Montel Jordan (5/2), Morphine (5/1), Neilson Hubbard (5/1), Overlook (5/2), Pain (5/3), Paula Cole (5/1), Paydirt (5/2), The Penetrators (5/1), The Pleasantdales (5/2), Reggae Cowboys (5/1), The Road Hawgs (5/2), Rick Hubbard & His All Kid Kazoo Band (5/2 & 5/3), Robert Cray Band (5/1), Robustos (5/1), Sam Salter (5/2), Larry Johnson & Adam (5/3), Semisonic (5/2), The Silent Kids (5/2), Sister Hazel (5/2), Sixteen Horsepower (5/1), Sixty Cycle Hum (5/2), Skwzbxx (5/3), Son Volt (5/1), Speech (5/2), Tinsley Ellis (5/3), Tito Puente (5/3), Tonic (5/3), Troutfishing In America (5/3), Tuscadero (5/3), Ugly Americans (5/2), Urban Grind (5/2), Velmer Watkins & the Angelic Choir (5/3), Violent Femmes (5/3), Vonda Shepard (5/1), Wild West Picture Show (5/3), Wil’'s Drama (5/2)

=== 1999 lineup ===
Friday 30 April 1999 – Sunday 2 May 1999 - $30.00 Three-day weekend ticket

60 Cycle Hum (5/1), 98 Degrees (5/2), Aaron Hall (5/1), Amanda Jones (4/30), Angie Aparo (5/1), B*witched (5/2), Bare Jr. (5/2), Ben Harper & The Innocent Criminals (5/1), Berlin (5/2), Big Atomic (5/1), Big Bad Voodoo Daddy (5/2), Big Sandy & His Fly-Rite Boys (5/2), The Black Crowes (4/30), BlackPerl (5/1), Blacklight Posterboys (5/2), Bloque (5/1), Blueground Undergrass (5/2), Bobby Blue Bland (4/30), Boozoo Chavis (5/1), Branford Marsalis (5/1), Brave Combo (5/1), Buckcherry (5/2), Burlap To Cashmere (5/1), Chris Duarte Group (5/1), Count Basie Orchestra (5/2), Cubanismo (5/2), Dance Contest/Deney Terrio (5/1), Deney Terrio (5/1), Deney Terrio & Motion (5/1), Destiny's Child (5/1), Digital Underground (4/30), Double Drive (5/2), Dovetail Joint (5/1), Dr. John (5/2), The Duke Robillard Band (5/1), El Caminos (5/2), Everclear (5/1), Fairfield Four (5/2), Fiji Mariners & Col. Bruce Hampton (5/2), File’ (5/1), Film (4/30), Francine Reed (5/2), The Funky Meters (4/30), Galactic (5/2), Gary Steer (5/1), George Thorogood & the Destroyers (5/1), Gibb Droll (5/2), Goodie Mob (5/1), The Gufs (5/2), Hole (5/2), Iggy Pop (5/1), Isaac Hayes (5/2), Jessica Simpson (5/2), Jonathan Richman (4/30), Joshua Redman Band (4/30), Kid Rock (5/1), Leftover Salmon (5/1), Lizardmen (5/2), Mandorico (4/30), Marvelous 3 (5/1), Mojo Nixon (5/1), Musique (5/1), New Immortals (5/1), Norman Blake (5/2), Otis Day & The Knights (5/2), Outkast (4/30), PJ Olsson (5/1), Peter Frampton (5/1), The Pleasantdales (5/1), Poor Little Fools (4/30), The Prodigals (5/1), Push Monkey (4/30), Randall Bramlett (4/30), Reel Big Fish (5/2), Reel Tight (5/1), The Rent Boys (4/30), Rick Springfield (5/1), Robin Trower (5/1), Ruthie & the Wranglers (5/2), Salt-n-Pepa (4/30), Shock Lobo (5/1), Soul Miner's Daughter (5/1), Soup (5/1), Sponge (4/30), Stereo Popsicle (4/30), Steve Riley & The Mamou Playboys (4/30), The Tendor Idols (5/1), Toots & The Maytals (4/30), Train (5/1), The Trammps featuring Earl Young (5/1), Trinket (4/30), Truckadelic (5/1), Ultraphonic (5/1), Urban Grind (5/1), Vedado (5/2), Velmer Watkins & The Angelic Choir (5/2), Vinyl (5/2), Virgo's Merlot (4/30), War (5/1), Widespread Panic (5/2), Wilco (5/1), Willie Nelson (4/30), Xavier Cugat Orchestra (4/30)

=== 2000 lineup ===
Friday 5 May 2000 – Sunday 7 May 2000 - $30.00 for a three-day weekend pass

3 Doors Down (5/5), 6 Piece (5/6), Adom (5/7), Albita (5/7), The Allman Brothers Band (5/7), Angie Aparo (5/6), Another Man Down (5/7), Baby DC (5/6), Bayou Dimayo (5/7), Bela Fleck & the Flecktones (5/6), Belmont Playboys (5/6), Ben Torres (5/6), Bend (5/5), Beth Hart (5/7), Beth Wood (5/7), Big People (5/6), Billionaire (5/7), Bio Ritmo (5/7), Bjorn Again (5/6), BR5-49 (5/7), Brand New Immortals (5/6), Captains of Industry (5/7) Celia Cruz (5/7), Charlie The Magician (5/7), Chocolate Kiss (5/7), Collective Soul (5/6), Comedy Response Unit (5/6), Controlled Airspace (5/7), Cracker (5/5), Creed (5/7), Darling Machine (5/5), Dave Dault (5/7), Dave Sloan (5/5), Deacon Brody (5/7), Donell Jones (5/6), Dropsonic (5/6), The El Caminos (5/7), Fabulous Thunderbirds (5/6), Fernando Sanchez & Kim Richards (5/7), Film (5/6), Foreigner (5/5), Francine Reed (5/7), Franklin & The Magic Fiddle (5/6&7)Fred Astaire Dance Studios (5/6&7), Geno Delafose & French Rockin Boogie (5/6), Georgia Mass Choir (5/7), Georgia Satellites (5/5), Giwayen Mata (5/5), Gretchen Gigly (5/6), Guster (5/6), Heirs of Promise (5/7), Injected (5/6), Italian Bistro Act (5/6), Jagged Edge (5/5), Janah (5/6), Jazz Mandolin Project (5/5), The Jeff Healey Band (5/7), Jimmy Cliff (5/5), Joe Satriani (5/6), Joe Walsh (5/6), Johnny Hyde (5/6), Jungle Brothers (5/6), Kathleen Turner Overdrive (5/5), Kenny Wayne Shepherd (5/7), King Sunny Ade (5/5), Kingdom Kids (5/7), Kitty Snyder (5/6), Koko Taylor and Her Blues Machine (5/6), La Bottine Souriante (5/6), Left Front Tire (5/7), Lil’ Malcolm & the House Rockers (5/6), Liquid Soul (5/6), Lisa Lisa (5/6), Little Jon & the Eastside Boyz (5/6), Lotustarr (5/6), Macha (5/6), Mary Delaney (5/5), Meshell Ndegéocello (5/5), Metrolanta Steel Pan Band (5/5), Metroscene (5/6), Modern Hero (5/7), moe. (5/6), The Music Class (5/6&7), Myssouri (5/6), NAS (5/6), Natalie MacMaster (5/5), Nickelback (5/6), Oasis (5/5), Oleander (5/6), Our Lady Peace (5/6), Owsley (5/5), Paul Rodgers (5/7) PDQ (5/6), Peter Searcy (5/7), Pimpadelic (5/6), Radford (5/5), Ratdog (5/5), Reggae Cowboys (5/5), Ricardo Lemvo & Makina Loca (5/7), The Road Kings (5/6), Robert Bradley's Blackwater Surprise (5/5), Sergent Garcia (5/7), Sevendust (5/7), Sick Speed (5/6), Slam 2000 Team (5/7), Slim Fatz & Barefoot Dave (5/7), Som Brasileiro (5/7), Southern Belles (5/6), Southern Culture on the Skids (5/6), Speech (5/5), Splender (5/6), Steep (5/6), Stir (5/7), Strangefolk (5/6), String Cheese Incident (5/6), Stroke 9 (5/7), he Supremes feat. Mary Wilson (5/7), Susan Tedeschi (5/7), Taj Mahal (5/7), Theresa Morton (5/7), Tinsley Ellis (5/7), The Tom Collins (5/5), Travis (5/5), Tyrese (5/5), Ultrababyfat (5/7), US Crush (5/6), Velmer Watkins and The Angelics (5/7), Vocal Tonic (5/6)

=== 2001 lineup ===
Friday 4 May 2001 – Sunday 6 May 2001

John Mayer, Train, Bob Dylan, Ludacris, The Offspring, Erykah Badu, Foreigner, Ben Harper, Al Green, Kansas, Kool & The Gang, Cheap Trick, Talib Kweli, Blue Öyster Cult, Live, Five For Fighting, The Black Crowes, O.A.R., The Cult, Patti Smith, Musiq Soulchild, Run DMC, The Wallflowers, Fuel, The Sugarhill Gang, Steve Earle, En Vogue, Less Than Jake, Lucinda Williams, Arrested Development, Our Lady Peace, Indigo Girls, Bilal, Loverboy, Night Ranger, Rehab, American Hi-Fi, Cracker, Gov't Mule, Little Feat, Eric Johnson, Galactic, Carl Thomas, Days of the New, Booker T. Jones, The Derek Trucks Band, Tantric, North Mississippi Allstars, The Smithereens, The Blind Boys of Alabama, Evan And Jaron, The Connells, Jerry Cantrell, Dirty Dozen Brass Band, Oleander, Jackyl, Delbert McClinton, The Gabe Dixon Band, Drivin' n' Cryin', Dexter Freebish, Marcia Ball, BeauSoleil, Sonia Dada, Shemekia Copeland, David Lindley, Marvelous 3, Injected, Josh Joplin Group, Johannes Linstead, Minus, Left Front Tire, Dan Hicks & The Hot Licks, Aerial, Soup, Francine Reed, The Senators, Blueground Undergrass, Jennifer Nettles Band, Treephort, L'il Brian And The Zydeco Travelers, The Forty Fives, Georgia Sea Island Singers, Greg Hester, Col Bruce Hampton And The Code Talkers, Young Antiques, Miller's Tale, Victoria Williams & Mark Olson, Original P, Nillah, X-impossibles, Kenny Howes & the Yeah, The Moto-litas, Craig Ellis, Shola Lewis, Andy Browne

=== 2002 lineup ===
Friday 3 May 2002 — Sunday 5 May 2002

Earth, Wind & Fire, 30 Seconds to Mars, Acres, Adema, Alastor, Albita, Angie Aparo, Asphalt Blaster, Avant, Béla Fleck and the Flecktones, Better Than Ezra, Big People, Blood, Sweat & Tears, Bo Diddley, Bone Thugs-n-Harmony, Bonnie Raitt, Brizz, Bruce Daigrepont, Bubba Sparxxx, Bush, Butch Walker, CeeLo Green, Charivari, Cindy Wilson, City High, Cornbread, Counting Crows, Course Of Nature, Darius Rucker, David Dunning, David Lee Roth, Disco Biscuits, Don McLean, Doria Roberts, Dropsonic, Earshot, Edwin McCain, Familiar 48, Flickerstick, Francine Reed, Garbage, Geno Delafose and French Rockin Boogie, The Georgia Satellites, Giwayen Mata, Greta Lee, Headstrong, Hoobastank, Hot August Knights, Incubus, Injected, Israel Vibration, Jack Johnson, Jad, Jaheim, Ja Rule, Jethro Tull, Jim Crow, Jimmy Bosch, Joan Jett and the Blackhearts, Joe Bonamassa, Journey, June Carter Cash, Karl Denson's Tiny Universe, Kid Rock, Lake Trout, L.O.A., Mark Farner, Metroscene, Michelle Malone, Mike Mills, Mother's Finest, Mystikal, Nathan & The Zydeco Cha, No Doubt, O.A.R., Ohio Players, Oliver Mtukudzi, Perpetual Groove, Pete Yorn, ph balance, Producers, Puddle of Mudd, Rana, Remy Zero, Res, Rick James, Robert Randolph & The Family Band, Rosie Ledet, Royal 7, Rubyhorse, Savoy Brown, Sean Costello, Sense Field, Sharissa, Skid Row, Slim Fatz, slowEarth, Stone Temple Pilots, Supermatic, The John Butler Trio, The Rantings of EVA, The Wood, Yard, The Zydeco Boneshakers, Tinsley Ellis, Tony Rich, Train, TrancesArc, Uncrowned, War, Zydefunk

=== 2003 lineup ===
Friday, May 2, 2003: Bob Dylan, Cracker, LL Cool J, Live, Sheryl Crow, Steve Winwood, The Les Claypool Frog Brigade, Unwritten Law, and Sound Tribe Sector 9

Saturday, May 3, 2003: Aimee Mann, Buddy Guy, Tony Bennett, Crosby, Stills & Nash, Dave Mason, Evanescence, Godsmack, Joe Cocker, King's X, Marc Broussard, Matt Nathanson, Medeski Martin & Wood, Mrnorth, Revis, Saliva, Sixpence None the Richer, Spookie Daly Pride, The Isley Brothers, The Mavericks, The Time, Tonic, Trapt, and doubleDrive.G Love and Special Sauce, Tony Bennett

Sunday, May 4, 2003: Aimee Mann, Antibalas, Ashanti, Ben Harper & The Innocent Criminals, Caitlin Cary, Cowboy Mouth, Def Leppard, Drive-By Truckers, Eve, Everclear, Gipsy Kings, Gomez, Gov’t Mule, Jack Johnson, Ratdog, Seether, Skerv Susan Tedeschi, Tonic, and Zwan.

=== 2004 lineup ===
Friday, April 30, 2004: Hoobastank, Ludacris, REO Speedwagon, and Tantric.

Saturday, May 1, 2004: Big Boi, Chris Robinson & The New Earth Mud, Doors of the 21st Century, Drive-By Truckers, Foo Fighters, The Offspring, The Strokes, and Wyclef Jean Train.

Sunday, May 2, 2004: CeeLo Green, Courtney Love, Fuel, Jason Mraz, Jessica Simpson, Journey, Twista, and Ween.

=== 2005 lineup ===
Friday, June 10, 2005:

 	06:15 PM – 06:45 PM     Sali Hagan 	Best Buy/ 99X Locals Only Stage
 	06:15 PM – 06:45 PM 	Young Capone 	Coca-Cola/Verizon Wireless/Hot 107.9/ Fox 5 Stage 
 	06:45 PM – 07:15 PM 	Bill Gentry 	Hooters/Kicks 101.5 Stage
 	06:45 PM – 07:15 PM 	Red Letter Agent 	Miller Lite/99X/Comcast Stage
 	07:00 PM – 08:00 PM 	4th and Dock 	Comcast/WABE Cultural Stage
 	07:15 PM – 07:45 PM 	Bobby Valentino 	Coca-Cola/Verizon Wireless/Hot 107.9/ Fox 5 Stage 
 	07:15 PM – 08:15 PM 	Francine Reed 	Ford/Best Buy/96 Rock/UPN Atlanta Stage
 	07:15 PM – 07:45 PM 	Linger 	Best Buy/ 99X Locals Only Stage
 	07:45 PM – 08:30 PM 	Cross Canadian Ragweed 	Hooters/Kicks 101.5 Stage
 	07:45 PM – 08:30 PM 	Michael Tolcher 	Miller Lite/99X/Comcast Stage
 	08:00 PM – 09:00 PM 	Jistoray 	Comcast/WABE Cultural Stage
 	08:30 PM – 09:00 PM 	23 Jinx 	Best Buy/ 99X Locals Only Stage
 	08:30 PM – 09:15 PM 	Ciara 	Coca-Cola/Verizon Wireless/Hot 107.9/ Fox 5 Stage 
 	08:45 PM – 09:45 PM 	Lou Reed 	Ford/Best Buy/96 Rock/UPN Atlanta Stage
 	09:00 PM – 10:00 PM 	Interpol 	Miller Lite/99X/Comcast Stage
 	09:00 PM – 10:00 PM 	Metalsome Monday Band 	Comcast/WABE Cultural Stage
 	09:00 PM – 10:00 PM 	Trace Adkins 	Hooters/Kicks 101.5 Stage
 	10:00 PM – 10:30 PM 	Avenge Vegas 	Best Buy/ 99X Locals Only Stage
 	10:00 PM – 11:30 PM 	Rareform DJ Crew 	Comcast/WABE Cultural Stage
 	10:00 PM – 11:30 PM 	The Game 	Coca-Cola/Verizon Wireless/Hot 107.9/ Fox 5 Stage 
 	10:15 PM – 11:45 PM 	Counting Crows 	Ford/Best Buy/96 Rock/UPN Atlanta Stage
 	10:30 PM – 12:00 AM 	Keith Urban 	Hooters/Kicks 101.5 Stage
 	10:30 PM – 12:00 AM 	The White Stripes 	Miller Lite/99X/Comcast Stage

Saturday, June 11, 2005:

 	02:00 PM – 02:30 PM 	She Wants Revenge 	Miller Lite/99X/Comcast Stage
 	02:30 PM – 03:30 PM 	Jabari Grover 	Comcast/WABE Cultural Stage
 	02:30 PM – 03:00 PM 	Psychic Hearts 	Best Buy/ 99X Locals Only Stage
 	03:00 PM – 03:45 PM 	American Minor 	Ford/Best Buy/96 Rock/UPN Atlanta Stage
 	03:00 PM – 03:45 PM 	Louis XIV 	Miller Lite/99X/Comcast Stage
 	03:00 PM – 03:45 PM 	The Wrights 	Hooters/Kicks 101.5 Stage
 	03:30 PM – 04:00 PM 	David Banner 	Coca-Cola/Verizon Wireless/Hot 107.9/ Fox 5 Stage 
 	03:30 PM – 04:30 PM 	Orquesta MaCuba 	Comcast/WABE Cultural Stage
 	03:45 PM – 04:15 PM 	Modern Skirts 	Best Buy/ 99X Locals Only Stage
 	04:15 PM – 05:15 PM 	Bloc Party 	Miller Lite/99X/Comcast Stage
 	04:15 PM – 05:15 PM 	Mofro 	Ford/Best Buy/96 Rock/UPN Atlanta Stage
 	04:15 PM – 05:15 PM 	Tift Merritt 	Hooters/Kicks 101.5 Stage
 	04:30 PM – 05:30 PM 	Metalsome Monday Band 	Comcast/WABE Cultural Stage
 	04:45 PM – 05:15 PM 	Trillville 	Coca-Cola/Verizon Wireless/Hot 107.9/ Fox 5 Stage 
 	05:15 PM – 05:45 PM 	Good Friday Experiment 	Best Buy/ 99X Locals Only Stage
 	05:30 PM – 06:30 PM 	GuRu Fish 	Comcast/WABE Cultural Stage
 	05:45 PM – 06:45 PM 	Darryl Worley 	Hooters/Kicks 101.5 Stage
 	05:45 PM – 06:45 PM 	The Features 	Miller Lite/99X/Comcast Stage
 	06:00 PM – 07:15 PM 	Robert Randolph & the Family Band 	Ford/Best Buy/96 Rock/UPN 
 	06:00 PM – 06:30 PM 	Slim Thug 	Coca-Cola/Verizon Wireless/Hot 107.9/ Fox 5 Stage 
 	06:30 PM – 07:30 PM 	Dominic Gaudious 	Comcast/WABE Cultural Stage
 	06:45 PM – 07:15 PM 	Honestly 	Best Buy/ 99X Locals Only Stage
 	07:15 PM – 07:45 PM 	Boyz N Da Hood 	Coca-Cola/Verizon Wireless/Hot 107.9/ Fox 5 Stage 
 	07:15 PM – 08:15 PM 	Chris Cagle 	Hooters/Kicks 101.5 Stage
 	07:15 PM – 08:15 PM 	Keane 	Miller Lite/99X/Comcast Stage
 	07:30 PM – 08:30 PM 	Metalsome Monday Band 	Comcast/WABE Cultural Stage
 	08:00 PM – 09:15 PM 	John Fogerty 	Ford/Best Buy/96 Rock/UPN Atlanta Stage
 	08:15 PM – 08:45 PM 	a fir-ju well 	Best Buy/ 99X Locals Only Stage
 	08:30 PM – 09:30 PM 	Common 	Coca-Cola/Verizon Wireless/Hot 107.9/ Fox 5 Stage 
 	08:30 PM – 09:30 PM 	Slick & Rose 	Comcast/WABE Cultural Stage
 	08:45 PM – 09:45 PM 	Clay Walker 	Hooters/Kicks 101.5 Stage
 	08:45 PM – 10:00 PM 	The Killers 	Miller Lite/99X/Comcast Stage
 	09:30 PM – 10:30 PM 	Groove Stain 	Comcast/WABE Cultural Stage
 	10:00 PM – 10:30 PM 	Five Eight 	Best Buy/ 99X Locals Only Stage
 	10:00 PM – 12:00 AM 	Tom Petty & the Heartbreakers 	Ford/Best Buy/96 Rock/UPN Atlanta Stage
 	10:15 PM – 11:45 PM 	Alan Jackson 	Hooters/Kicks 101.5 Stage
 	10:15 PM – 11:30 PM 	Black Eyed Peas 	Coca-Cola/Verizon Wireless/Hot 107.9/ Fox 5 Stage 
 	10:30 PM – 11:30 PM 	Kids with codenames 	Comcast/WABE Cultural Stage
 	10:30 PM -              The Pixies 	Miller Lite/99X/Comcast Stage

Sunday, June 12, 2005:

 	02:30 PM – 03:00 PM 	Big Tako 	Best Buy/ 99X Locals Only Stage
 	02:30 PM – 02:50 PM 	Choc 	Coca-Cola/Verizon Wireless/Hot 107.9/ Fox 5 Stage 
 	02:30 PM – 03:30 PM 	Matt Turk 	Comcast/WABE Cultural Stage
 	03:00 PM – 03:30 PM 	Angela Wolff 	Hooters/Kicks 101.5 Stage
 	03:00 PM – 03:45 PM 	Tegan and Sara 	Miller Lite/99X/Comcast Stage
 	03:00 PM – 03:30 PM 	Whodini 	Coca-Cola/Verizon Wireless/Hot 107.9/ Fox 5 Stage 
 	03:15 PM – 04:00 PM 	Luna Halo 	Ford/Best Buy/96 Rock/UPN Atlanta Stage
 	03:30 PM – 04:30 PM 	Nation Beat 	Comcast/WABE Cultural Stage
 	03:40 PM – 04:10 PM 	Biz Markie 	Coca-Cola/Verizon Wireless/Hot 107.9/ Fox 5 Stage 
 	03:45 PM – 04:15 PM 	Tim Brantley 	Best Buy/ 99X Locals Only Stage
 	04:00 PM – 04:45 PM 	Cowboy Crush 	Hooters/Kicks 101.5 Stage
 	04:15 PM – 05:00 PM 	Coheed and Cambria 	Miller Lite/99X/Comcast Stage
 	04:20 PM – 05:00 PM 	MC Lyte 	Coca-Cola/Verizon Wireless/Hot 107.9/ Fox 5 Stage 
 	04:30 PM – 05:30 PM 	10 degrees Off 	Comcast/WABE Cultural Stage
 	04:30 PM – 05:30 PM 	Joan Jett & The Blackhearts 	Ford/Best Buy/96 Rock/UPN Atlanta Stage
 	05:00 PM – 05:30 PM 	Collective Efforts 	Best Buy/ 99X Locals Only Stage
 	05:10 PM – 06:40 PM 	Doug E. Fresh 	Coca-Cola/Verizon Wireless/Hot 107.9/ Fox 5 Stage 
 	05:10 PM – 06:40 PM 	Slick Rick 	Coca-Cola/Verizon Wireless/Hot 107.9/ Fox 5 Stage 
 	05:15 PM – 06:15 PM 	Jo Dee Messina 	Hooters/Kicks 101.5 Stage
 	05:30 PM – 06:30 PM 	Metalsome Monday Band 	Comcast/WABE Cultural Stage
 	05:45 PM – 06:45 PM 	The Lemonheads 	Miller Lite/99X/Comcast Stage
 	06:00 PM – 07:00 PM 	Def Leppard 	Ford/Best Buy/96 Rock/UPN Atlanta Stage
 	06:30 PM – 07:30 PM 	Enobi 	Comcast/WABE Cultural Stage
 	06:45 PM – 08:15 PM 	Montgomery Gentry 	Hooters/Kicks 101.5 Stage
 	06:45 PM – 07:15 PM 	Trances Arc 	Best Buy/ 99X Locals Only Stage
 	07:15 PM – 08:45 PM 	DEVO 	Miller Lite/99X/Comcast Stage
 	07:15 PM – 08:30 PM 	Public Enemy 	Coca-Cola/Verizon Wireless/Hot 107.9/ Fox 5 Stage 
 	07:30 PM – 09:00 PM 	Kid Rock

=== 2011 lineup ===
Saturday, 24 September 2011: Band of Skulls, Cage the Elephant, Coldplay, Manchester Orchestra, The Black Keys, The Constellations, The Joy Formidable, The Postelles, Walk the Moon, and Young the Giant.

=== 2012 lineup ===
Friday, 21 September 2012: Foo Fighters, The Avett Brothers, T.I., Joan Jett & The Blackhearts, and Van Hunt.

Saturday, 22 September 2012: Pearl Jam, Girl Talk, Florence & The Machine, Neon Trees, Ludacris, Adam Ant, Garbage, LP, Civil Twilight, and O'Brother.

=== 2013 lineup ===
Dates: September 20, 2013 – September 21, 2013

(Artists listed from earliest to latest set times.)

Electric Ballroom Stage

Friday: Drivin N Cryin, Phoenix, Journey
Saturday: The Neighbourhood, Weezer, Arctic Monkeys, Yeah Yeah Yeahs, Red Hot Chili Peppers

Great Southeast Music Hall Stage

Friday: 2 Chainz, Jane's Addiction
Saturday: Reignwolf, The Black Lips, Imagine Dragons, Queens of the Stone Age

Roxy Stage

Friday: North Mississippi Allstars, The Mowgli's, Cake
Saturday: Mona, Capital Cities, ZZ Ward, Tegan and Sara, Kendrick Lamar

=== 2014 lineup ===
Dates: September 19, 2014 – September 20, 2014

(Artists listed from earliest to latest set times)

Electric Ballroom Stage

Friday: Mayer Hawthorne, Run DMC, John Mayer
Saturday: Magic Man, Vic Mensa, B.o.B, Lana Del Rey, Eminem

Honda Stage

Friday: Banks (singer), Lorde
Saturday: The Strypes, Twenty One Pilots, Fitz and the Tantrums, Bastille (band)

Roxy Stage

Friday: Ron Pope, Bear Hands, Iggy Azalea, Jack White
Saturday: Sleeper Agent (band), AER, Third Eye Blind, NEEDTOBREATHE, Gregg Allman, Zac Brown Band

=== 2015 lineup ===
Dates: September 18, 2015 – September 19, 2015

(Artists listed from earliest to latest set times.)

Electric Ballroom Stage

Friday: Kodaline, Hozier, Drake (rapper)
Saturday: Colony House, Andrew McMahon And The Wilderness, Hall & Oates, Run The Jewels, Sam Smith

Honda Stage

Friday: August Alsina, Alice in Chains
Saturday: X Ambassadors, The Airborne Toxic Event, Icona Pop, Lenny Kravitz

Belk Stage

Friday: Vinyl Theatre, Tove Lo, Jenny Lewis, Elton John
Saturday: New Politics, Elle King, Billy Idol, Panic! at the Disco, Van Halen

Cotton Club Stage

Friday: Jamie N Commons, Elliot Moss, Metric
Saturday: Alessia Cara, Rozzi Crane, Catfish and the Bottlemen, Vance Joy

=== 2016 lineup ===
Dates: September 17, 2016 – September 18, 2016

(Artists listed from earliest to latest set times.)

Electric Ballroom Stage

Saturday: Zella Day, DNCE, Leon Bridges, G-Eazy, Twenty One Pilots
Sunday: Joseph (band), St. Lucia (musician), James Bay (singer), The Lumineers, The Killers

Honda Stage

Saturday: Balkan Beat Box, NF, Logic, Big Boi, ColleGrove
Sunday: Peter Bjorn and John, Corinne Bailey Rae, Nathaniel Rateliff & the Night Sweats, Alabama Shakes

Roxy Stage

Saturday: City and Colour/Dallas Green, Chvrches, Band of Horses, Beck
Sunday: Daya (singer), Melanie Martinez (singer), Grouplove, Kesha, deadmau5

Cotton Club Stage

Saturday: Johnnyswim, The Coathangers, Lucius (band), Mayer Hawthorne
Sunday: The Shadowboxers, Pete Yorn, Raury, DJ Mustard

=== 2017 lineup ===
Dates: September 16, 2017 – September 17, 2017

(Artists listed from earliest to latest set times.)

Salesforce Stage

Saturday: Dua Lipa, Vintage Trouble, Tove Lo, Big Sean, Bruno Mars
Sunday: Circa Waves, Coin, Collective Soul, Haim, Mumford & Sons

Honda Stage

Saturday: Bibi Bourelly, Oh Wonder, The Strumbellas, Wiz Khalifa
Sunday: Hiss Golden Messenger, Judah & the Lion, Two Door Cinema Club, Bastille (band)

Roxy Stage

Saturday: Daye Jack, PVRIS, Milky Chance, Weezer, Blink-182
Sunday: Midnight Larks, Missio (duo), Zara Larsson, Young The Giant, Future

Cotton Club Stage

Saturday: Sunflower Bean, AJR, Broods, The Naked and Famous
Sunday: Trippie Redd, Joywave, Lizzo, Russ

One 2-Day Regular General Admission Ticket cost $178.72, including $33.72 of service charges.

=== 2018 lineup ===
Dates: September 15, 2018 – September 16, 2018

(Artists listed from earliest to latest set times.)

Salesforce Stage

Saturday:The Aces, Twin Shadow, Rainbow Kitten Surprise, Thirty Seconds To Mars, Post Malone
Sunday:Sir, Two Feet, Janelle Monáe, Gucci Mane, Kendrick Lamar

Great Southeast Music Hall Stage

Saturday:Arthur Buck, Billie Eilish, Kacey Musgraves Portugal. The Man
Sunday:Black Pistol Fire, Arizona, Bazzi, Khalid

Roxy Stage

Saturday:Mattiel, Lovelytheband, Børns, The Revivalists, Fall Out Boy
Sunday:Berklee College of Music, K.Flay, Butch Walker, Foster The People, Imagine Dragons

Cotton Club Stage

Saturday:Yuno, Saint Jhn, Chromeo, Awolnation
Sunday:Robert Delong, Maggie Rogers, First Aid Kit, Sylvan Esso

One 2-Day Regular General Admission Ticket cost $191.08 or $183.90, including $46.08 or $38.90 of service charges, respectively. The more expensive option includes a 3D Collectible Credential.

=== 2019 lineup ===
Dates: September 14, 2019 – September 15, 2019

(Artists listed from earliest to latest set times.)

Venue: Piedmont Park

Roxy Stage

Saturday: Faye Webster, Madison Beer, BANKS, LIZZO, Cardi B

Sunday: GOLDSPACE + Good Company, Bad Suns, Local Natives, Leon Bridges, VAMPIRE WEEKEND

Cotton Club Stage

Saturday: Band of Skulls, Sigrid, Quinn XCII, KALI UCHIS

Sunday: 99 Neighbors, Taylor Bennett, JADEN SMITH, Cold War Kids

Great Southeast Music Hall Stage

Saturday: YOLA, REIGNWOLF, Tash Sultana, Lil Yachty

Sunday: Hero the Band, Dominic Fike, MǾ, 6LACK

Salesforce Stage

Saturday: Kevin Garrett, Hembree, Lord Huron, Charlie Puth, Panic! At The Disco

Sunday: The Coathangers, SHAED, WALK THE MOON, Billie Eilish, Travis Scott

One 2-Day General Admission Ticket cost $155, including $49.90 of service charges.

=== 2021 lineup ===
Dates: September 18, 2021 - September 19, 2021

(Artists listed from earliest to latest set times.)

Venue: Piedmont Park

Roxy Stage

Saturday: Mom Rock, 070 Shake, Eric Nam, AJR, Jonas Brothers

Sunday: Masked Wolf, 24kGoldn, Megan thee Stallion, Marshmello

Cotton Club Stage

Saturday: Teddy Swims, Ashnikko, Oliver Tree, Tierra Whack

Sunday: Tate McRae, Latto, Jack Harlow

Great Southeast Music Stage

Saturday: Morgan Vinson, Unusual Demont, Mariah the Scientist, Lauv, Machine Gun Kelly

Sunday: Sophia Messa, Gus Dapperton, Surfaces, Black Pumas

Verizon Stage

Saturday: Saleka, Girl in Red, Dashboard Confessional, 21 Savage, Maroon 5

Sunday: Ant Clemons, Remi Wolf, Bleachers, Yungblud, Miley Cyrus

2021 General Admission 2 Day Tickets were $145.00, 2 Day Student General Admission Tickets were $135.00, 2 Day General Admission Plus Tickets were $305.00, 2 Day VIP Tickets were $650.00, 2 Day Super VIP Tickets were $1,300.00.

=== 2023 lineup ===
Dates: September 15, 2023 - September 17, 2023

(Artists listed from earliest to latest set times.)

Venue: Piedmont Park

IHG Hotels & Resort Stage

Friday: Skaiwater, J.I.D., Flume

Saturday: Ed Rox, Sueco, Yung Gravy, Niall Horan, The 1975

Sunday: The National Parks, Joy Oladokun, Masego, GloRilla, Lil Baby

Gala Music Cotton Club

Saturday: Grace Gardner · Tess Clare · Maria Alexa, Calder Allen, Upsahl, Destroy Lonely

Sunday: Magic City Hippies, JP Saxe, Tove Lo, Young Nudy

Gopuff Great Southeast Music Stage

Saturday: Sarah Kinsley, The Midnight, The Rose, Louis the Child

Sunday: BigXthaPlug, PJ Morton, Big Wild, The Garden

Venmo Stage

Friday: Leah Kate, Pitbull, Pink

Saturday: The Moss, Maude Latour, Lizzy McAlpine, Fletcher, Billie Eilish

Sunday: Swavay, Inhaler, First Aid Kit, Incubus, Guns N' Roses

Thirty Seconds to Mars was scheduled to perform but dropped out a few weeks prior to the festival due to unknown circumstances.

2023 General Admission 3 Day Tickets were $280, 3 Day Student General Admission Plus Tickets were $415, 3 Day VIP Tickets were $805, 3 Day Super VIP were $1,525, 3 Day General Admission Student Tickets were $199, 2 Day General Admission Tickets were $225, 1 Day General Admission Tickets were $155, 1 Day General Admission Plus Tickets were $199, 1 Day VIP Tickets were $445, and 1 Day Super VIP tickets were $750.
