= Baltimore Block =

- U.S. National Register of Historic Places
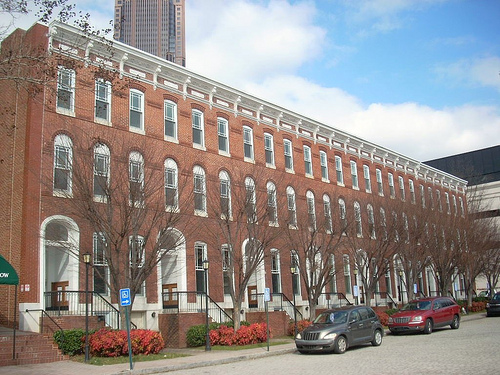

- Location within Atlanta Location within Georgia Location within the United States
- Location: Atlanta, Georgia
- Coordinates: 33°46′6″N 84°23′16″W
- Built: 1885
- Architect: Atlanta Land Improvement Co.
- NRHP reference No.: 76000622
- Added to NRHP: June 3, 1976

Baltimore Block is a series of eight rowhouses in the SoNo district of Atlanta, Georgia. Rowhouses of the kind that are abundant in Baltimore are an unusual housing type in Atlanta, where duplexes or semidetached housing, such as shotgun houses, were more common forms of high-density housing. Built in 1885 by Baltimore native Jacob J. Rosenthal, the houses were leased on long-term ground lease terms, a common practice in Baltimore. By the 1920s, the houses began to fall out of fashion, and four units were torn down while the others became derelict. A recovery began in the 1930s, and in the 1960s the area became a center of counterculture. Extensive renovation took place during the 1980s, when the units were consolidated and converted to office use.

Like many Baltimore houses, the brick three-story rowhouses of Baltimore Block present a unified wall-like front to the street with a continuous cornice line.

== Photo gallery ==
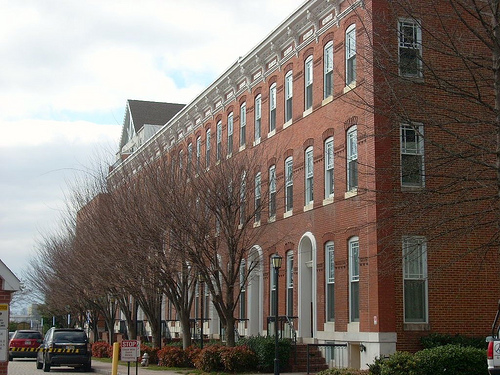
View from West Peachtree Street

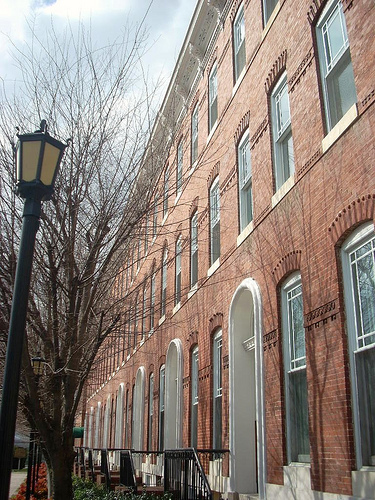
Front facade detail

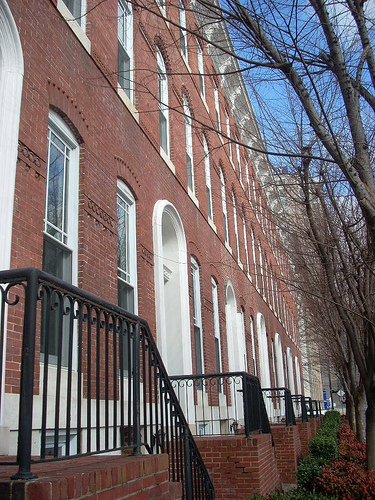
Front porches

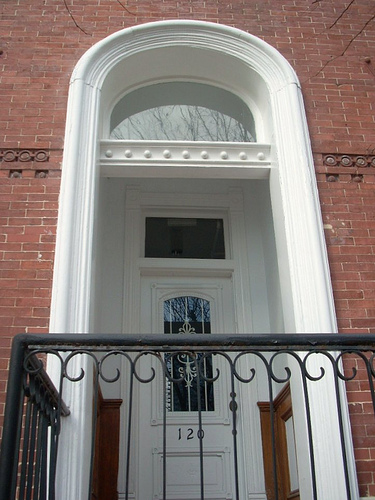
Front door detail

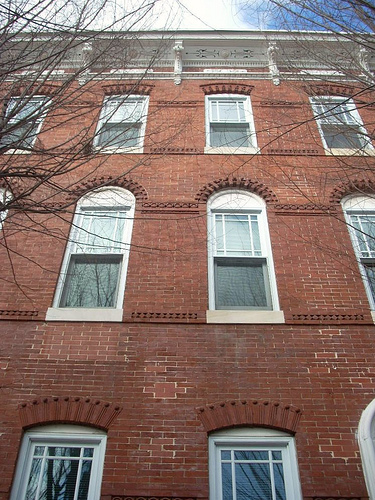
Windows and cornice details

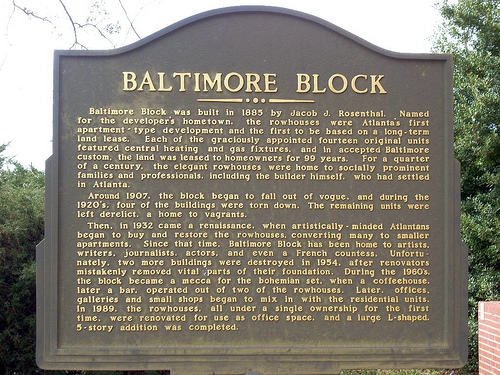
National Register Historical Marker

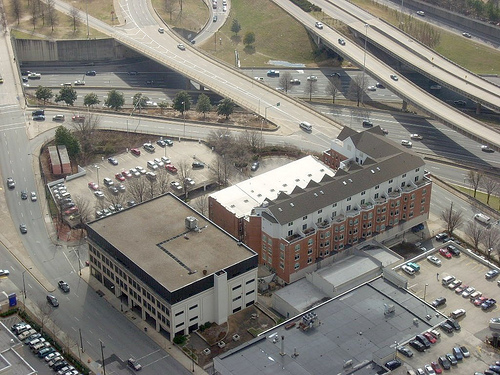
Aerial view; 1980s construction makes an "L" around the original Baltimore Block, which can be distinguished, here, by its flat roof

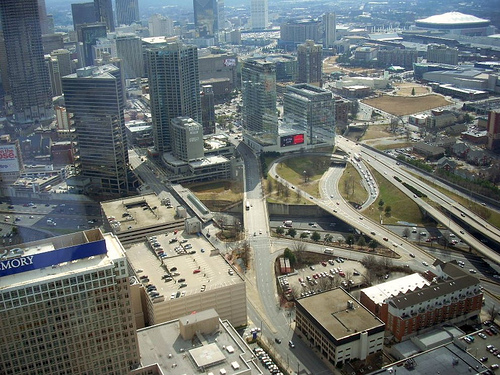
Aerial view from Bank of America Plaza's 46th floor; downtown Atlanta in upper left of photo; I-75/I-85 (the Connector) is the major road artery running under the bridges and near the edges of Baltimore Block at bottom right corner
