= Emory University Hospital Midtown =

Hospital in Atlanta, Georgia

Coordinates: 33.768497°N 84.386428°W

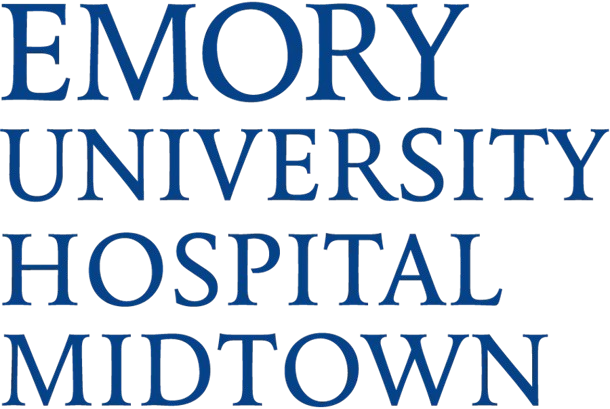

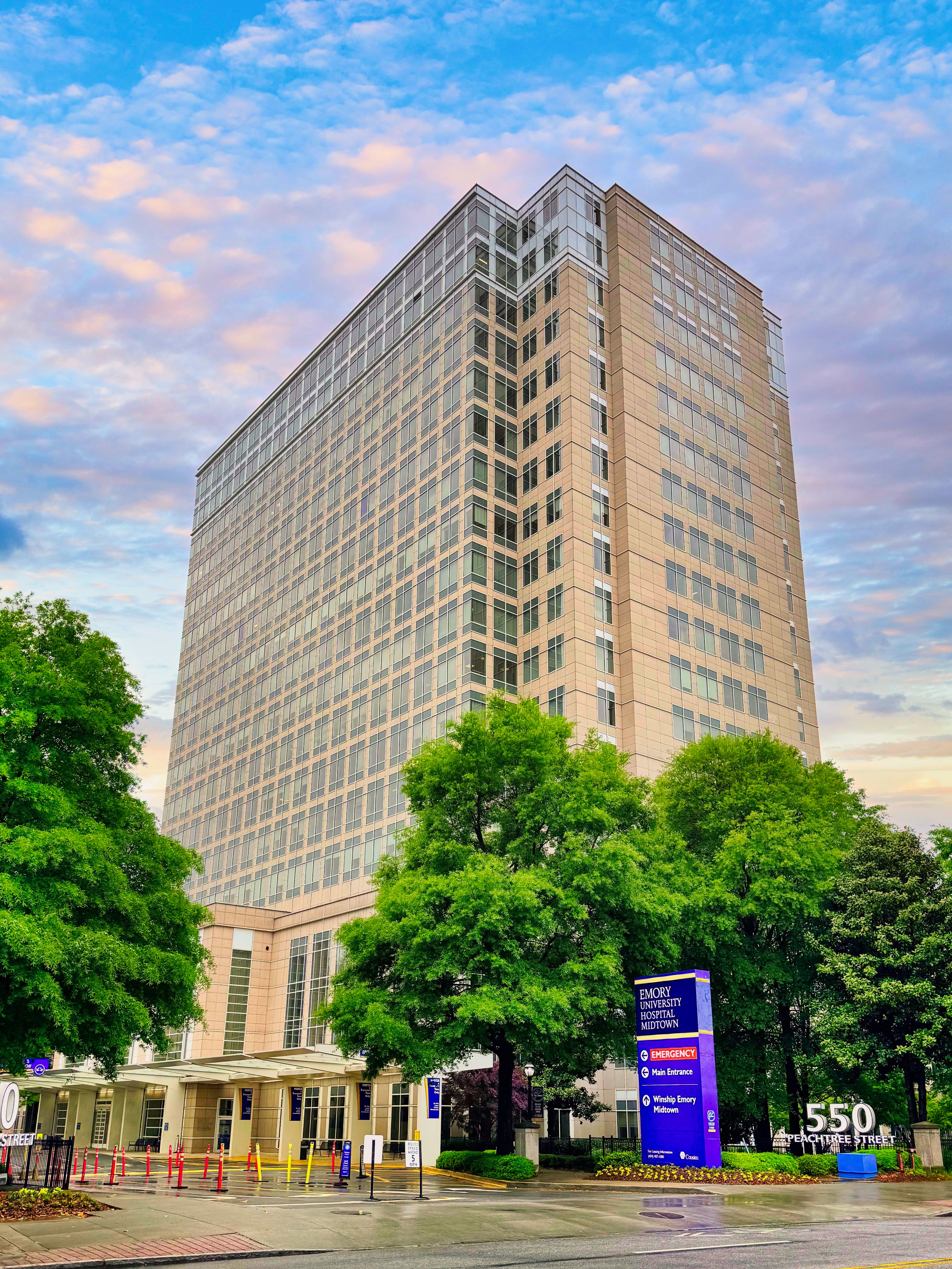
- Emory Midtown in 2024

Geography
- Location: SoNo, Atlanta, Georgia, United States

Organization
- Care system: Emory Healthcare
- Type: Teaching
- Affiliated university: Emory University

Services
- Beds: 511

History
- Former names: Emory Crawford Long Hospital; Crawford W. Long Memorial Hospital
- Opened: 1908

Links
- Website: emoryhealthcare.org
- Lists: Hospitals in Georgia

Emory University Hospital Midtown (originally Crawford W. Long Memorial Hospital, sometimes Crawford Long Hospital or simply Crawford Long, and formerly Emory Crawford Long Hospital) is a 511-bed acute care teaching hospital located in the SoNo district of Atlanta, Georgia, United States, and affiliated with Emory Healthcare. The hospital's CEO is Dan Owens. Emory University Hospital Midtown is staffed by more than 1,000 private-practice and Emory Clinic physicians, spanning 28 specialties including cardiology, cardiothoracic surgery, oncology, neurosciences, general and vascular surgery, internal medicine, urology, obstetrics and gynecology. There is a level III neonatal ICU.

== History ==
Emory's Midtown hospital celebrated its 100-year anniversary in 2008.

The institution's history dates back to 1908, when two physicians, Edward Campbell Davis and a former student of his, Luther C. Fischer, opened the 26-bed Davis-Fischer Sanatorium on Crew Street, near present-day Turner Field. With just 26 beds, the hospital quickly outgrew its capacity and by 1911, Davis and Fischer moved the hospital to its present site, opening an 85-bed Davis-Fischer Sanatorium on Linden Avenue. The 11-story W. W. Orr Doctors' Building opened in 1930.

In 1931, the hospital was renamed Crawford W. Long Memorial Hospital in honor of Crawford W. Long, the Georgia physician who discovered sulphuric ether for use as an anesthetic, and was the first doctor to use anesthesia during surgery.

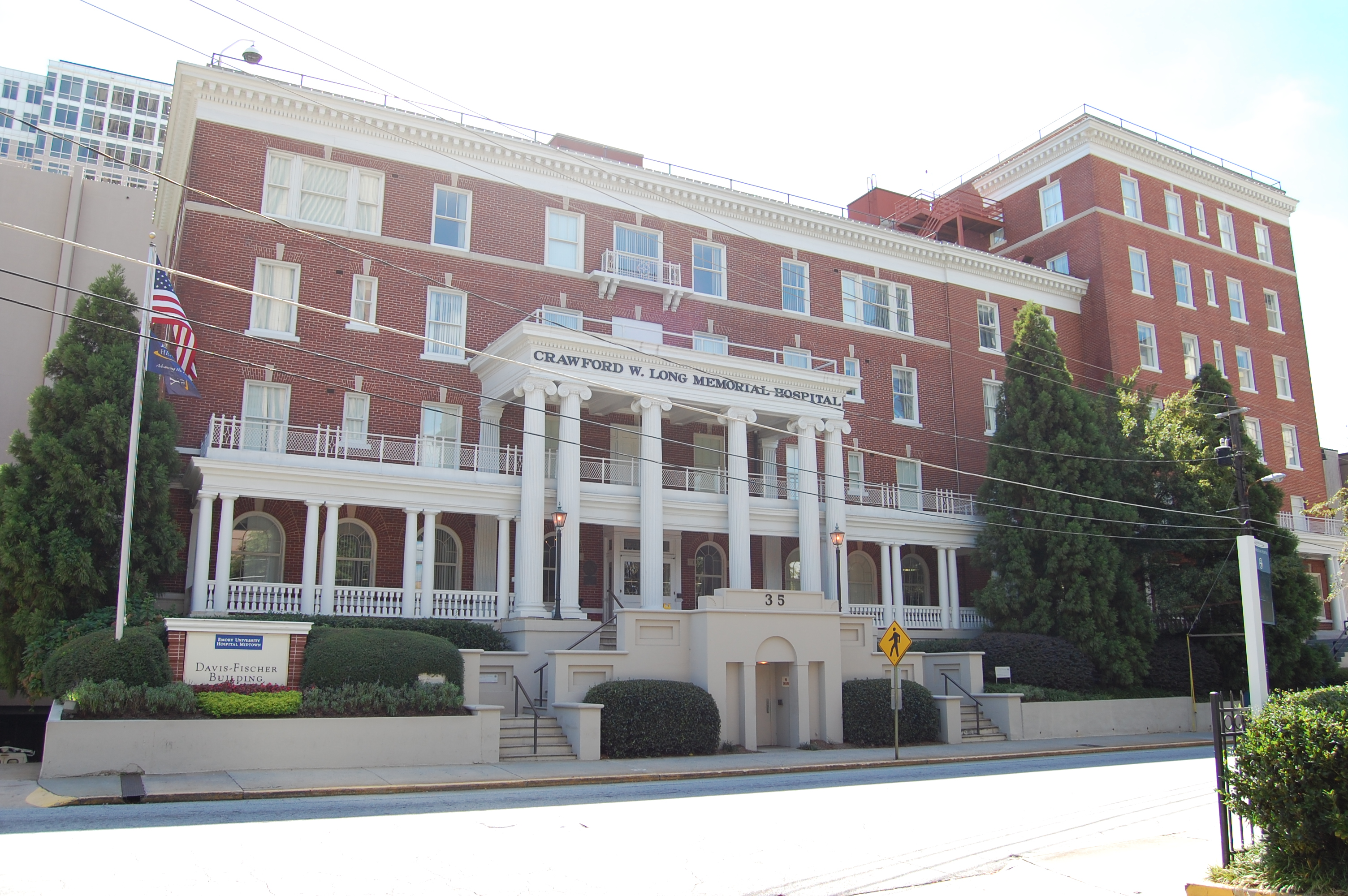
Davis-Fischer Building in 2013

Emory Crawford Long Hospital was renamed "Emory University Hospital Midtown", effective February 13, 2009, in order to more clearly identify it as part of the university. However, as part of Emory's commitment to honor a more than 100-year history of the original name, 'Crawford W. Long Memorial Hospital' is retained on exterior monuments.

== See also ==
- Emory University Hospital
