= SoNo, Atlanta =

Neighborhood of Atlanta, Georgia

Coordinates: 33.4558°N 84.231°W

SoNo sign on North Avenue at the base of the Bank of America Plaza

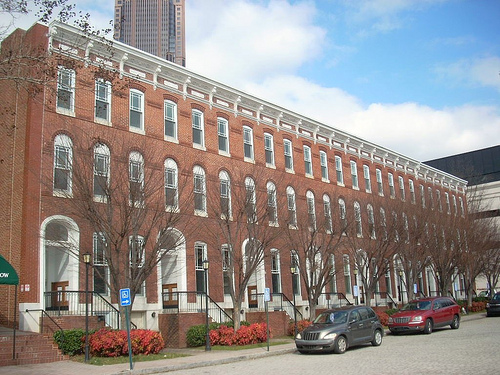
Rowhouses on the Baltimore Block

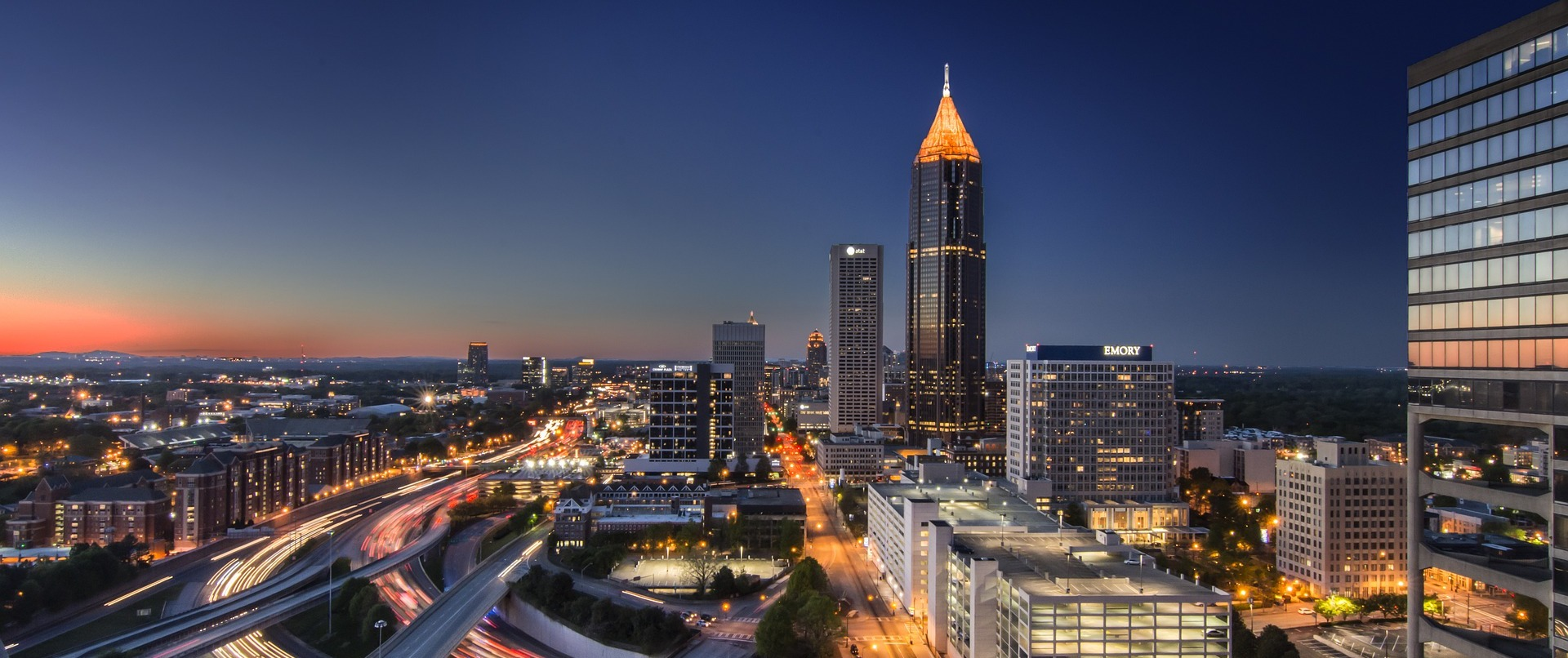
The skyline of SoNo

SoNo (South of North Avenue) is a sub-district of downtown Atlanta, Georgia, just south of Midtown. The area was defined and named by T. Brian Glass while working on a rezoning committee with Central Atlanta Progress in 2005 in order to better establish an identity for the area and give it a hipper image. SoNo refers to the area of Downtown bounded by North Avenue on the north, Central Park Place on the east and the Downtown Connector (Interstate-75/85) on the west and south.

Ongoing urban renewal efforts in the new neighborhood seek to establish a chic cultural identity for the underdeveloped area, as well as reunite the Midtown and Downtown commercial districts (which have remained mostly divided since the construction of the Downtown Connector through the heart of the city), including a proposed "interstate cap" over the highway that would extend Mayor's Park south along Peachtree Street to Baker Street.

SoNo is home to several attractions, including Emory University Hospital Midtown, the Atlanta Civic Center, Shakespeare Tavern and the Bank of America Plaza, the city's tallest building. It also is home to the historic Baltimore Block and Rufus M. Rose House. SoNo's centerpiece Renaissance and Central Parks were also the site of Atlanta's annual Music Midtown festival, before moving to Piedmont Park.

Public transportation is provided by MARTA with buses and with the north-south rail line serving the Civic Center station.

== History ==
In the last decades of the 19th century and the first years of the 20th, Peachtree Street was a street of elegant mansions — the Rufus M. Rose House being the last remaining example in what is now SoNo. These gradually were replaced by commercial buildings, large churches, apartment buildings and boarding houses and by the end of the 1920s the transformation was complete. With suburbanization in the mid-20th century, the area went into a period of decline. When given its name and new image by T. Brian Glass while working on a rezoning committee with Central Atlanta Progress in 2005, SoNo had not yet participated substantially in the renaissance of either downtown to the south or Midtown to the north.

The area from Piedmont east to Central Park had a different history — this developed as the Buttermilk Bottom slum area, which was razed in the 1960s. Most of the land then remained empty, the Convention Center (built 1967), now the Boisfeuillet Jones Atlanta Civic Center, being an exception. Finally, in the mid-1980s new, mostly mixed-income projects were built on the land, while some of the land was used for today's Renaissance Park.
