= Four Roses =

Brand of bourbon whiskey

Four Roses Bourbon
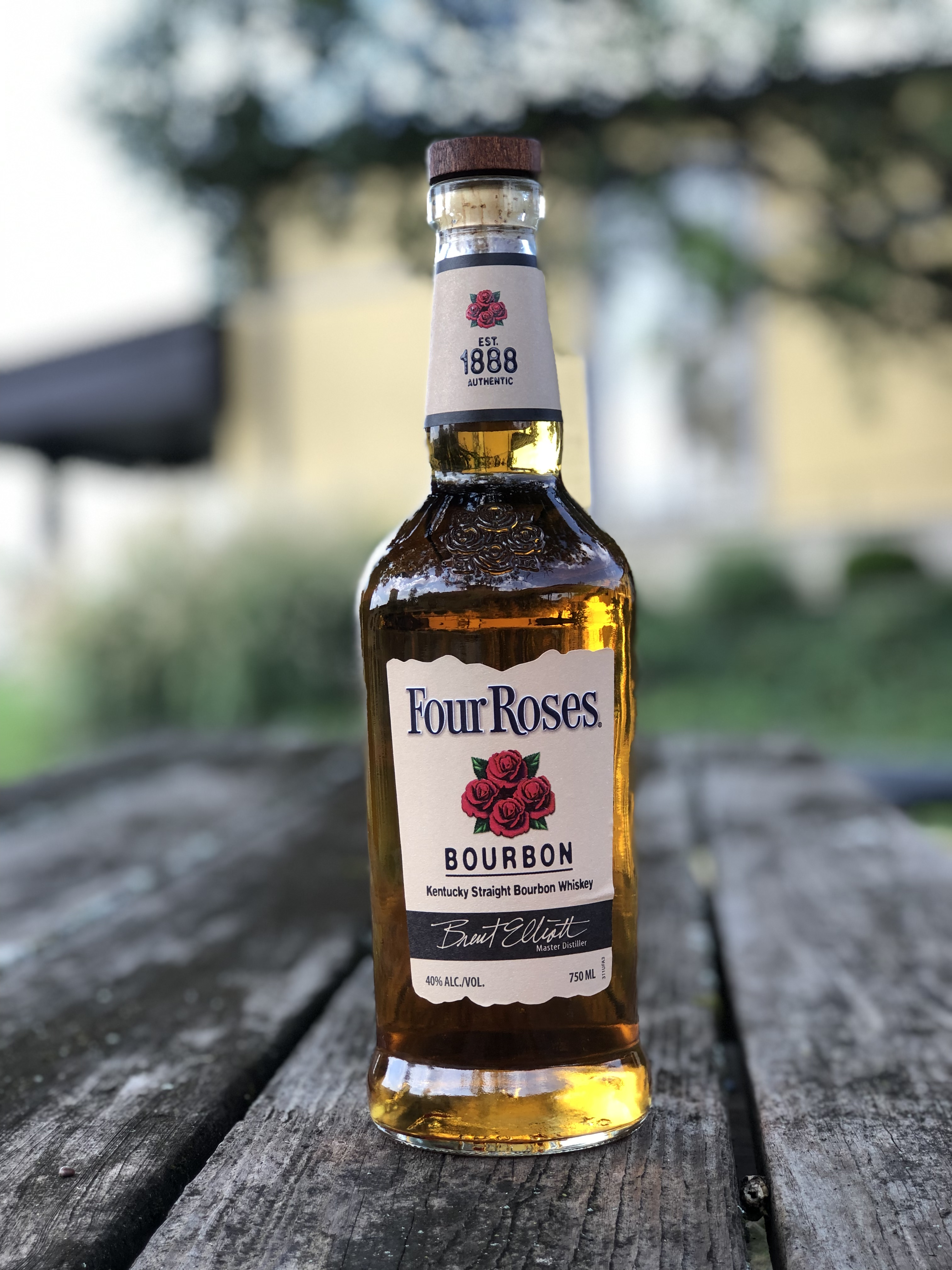
- Four Roses Bourbon
- Type: Bourbon Whiskey
- Manufacturer: Four Roses Distillery LLC (Kirin)
- Origin: United States
- Introduced: 1888
- Alcohol by volume: 40% Four Roses Bourbon; 45% Small Batch; 50% Single Barrel; 52% Small Batch Select
- Proof (US): 80 Four Roses Bourbon; 90 Small Batch; 100 Single Barrel; 104 Small Batch Select
- Website: www.fourrosesbourbon.com

- Old Prentice Distillery
- U.S. National Register of Historic Places
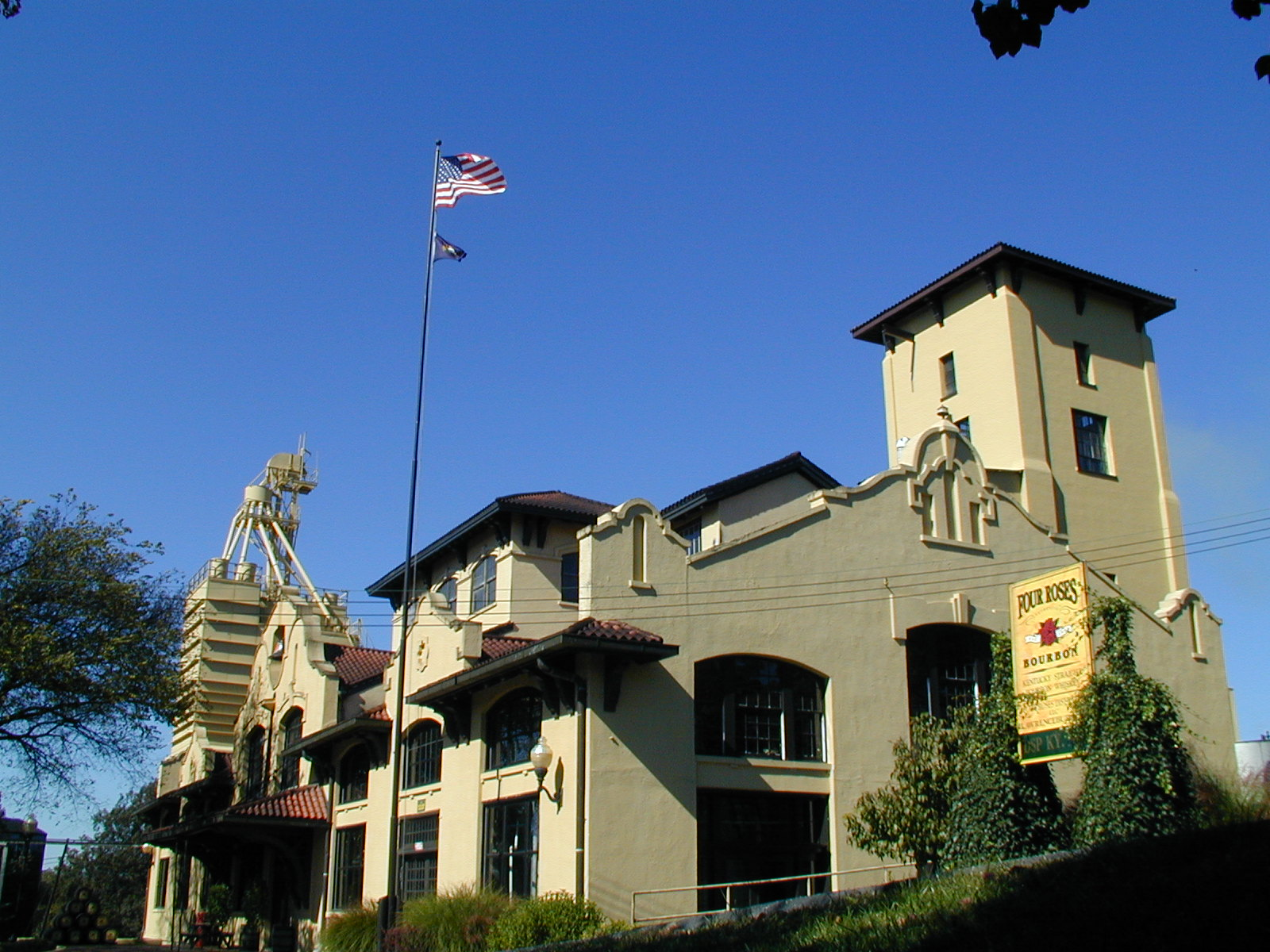
- Four Roses distillery main building

- Location within Kentucky Location within the United States
- Location: Lawrenceburg, Kentucky
- Coordinates: 37°58′23″N 84°53′54″W
- Built: 1910
- Architect: Joseph & Joseph Architects
- Architectural style: Spanish Mission revival
- NRHP reference No.: 87000478
- Added to NRHP: March 19, 1987

Four Roses is a brand of Kentucky straight bourbon whiskey produced at Four Roses Distillery in Lawrenceburg, Kentucky by the Kirin Brewery Company.

Its Spanish Mission-style distillery was built in 1910 and is listed on the National Register of Historic Places as Old Prentice Distillery. The company's warehouse for aging and bottling operations is in Cox's Creek, Kentucky. The brand and its products have evolved and transformed since the company's founding in the late 19th century, and especially since the firm's acquisition by the Kirin Brewery Company of Japan at the beginning of the 21st century.

== History ==
There are conflicting accounts of the brand's origin. Four Roses owner Kirin Brewery names Paul Jones Jr. as the founder of the brand. The company says the brand name was trademarked in 1888 by Jones, who claimed it had been produced and sold as early as the 1860s. An alternative account has the brand founded by Rufus Mathewson Rose, speculating it was probably named in honor of himself, his brother Origen, and their two sons. The company website makes no mention of anyone named Rose.

The Four Roses distillery in Lawrenceburg, Kentucky, was built in 1910 with Spanish Mission-style architecture, and is listed on the National Register of Historic Places. It was originally called the Old Prentice distillery and was owned by J.T.S. Brown. It was designed by Joseph & Joseph Architects, a firm with a history that has spanned more than a century in distillery design.

The Four Roses brand was purchased by Seagram distillers, a Canadian firm, in 1943. Around the end of the 1950s, Seagram discontinued its sale within the United States in order to focus on promoting its core product, blended whiskey – although it introduced other brands of premium straight bourbons in the 1960s and 1970s, such as Benchmark and Eagle Rare. A staid product in the US, Four Roses Kentucky straight bourbon's focus was shifted to Europe and Asia, which were rapidly growing markets at the time. In the United States during this period, the Four Roses name was used on a blended whiskey, made mostly of neutral grain spirits and commonly seen as a lower tier brand. Four Roses continued to be unavailable as a straight bourbon in the US market until after 1995. In 1999, Four Roses brand ownership passed from Seagram to Vivendi/Universal, then in 2001 to Pernod Ricard and Diageo before being purchased by The Kirin Brewery in 2002. Kirin discontinued the sale of blended whiskey to focus exclusively on Four Roses Kentucky straight bourbon whiskey.

The brand's master distiller from 1995 to 2015 was Jim Rutledge, who had started working for Seagram in 1966. The previous master distiller was Ova Haney. Since Rutledge's retirement in 2015, the master distiller has been Brent Elliott, who had worked with Rutledge for the preceding 10 years. Elliot is originally from Owensboro, Kentucky, and has a degree in chemistry from the University of Kentucky.

In April 2019, the Four Roses distillery completed a $55 million expansion project that coincided with the launch of Small Batch Select – the first permanent addition to the distillery's bourbon lineup in 12 years. The distillery's expansion project began in 2015 and resulted in the ability to double production capacity.

The expansion project invested $34 million into the Four Roses distillery in Lawrenceburg, and $21 million at the Warehouse & Bottling facility in Cox's Creek. At the distillery, Four Roses added two new buildings and equipment, including a new column and doubler still and more fermenters.

With the duplicate column and doubler still, production capacity is scheduled to increase from 4 million to 8 million proof gallons, enough to fill more than 130,000 barrels per year (261,000 hectolitres). The Louisville-based architecture firm Joseph & Joseph designed the original distillery in 1910, and modeled the new buildings after the existing Spanish mission-style structures.

== Products ==
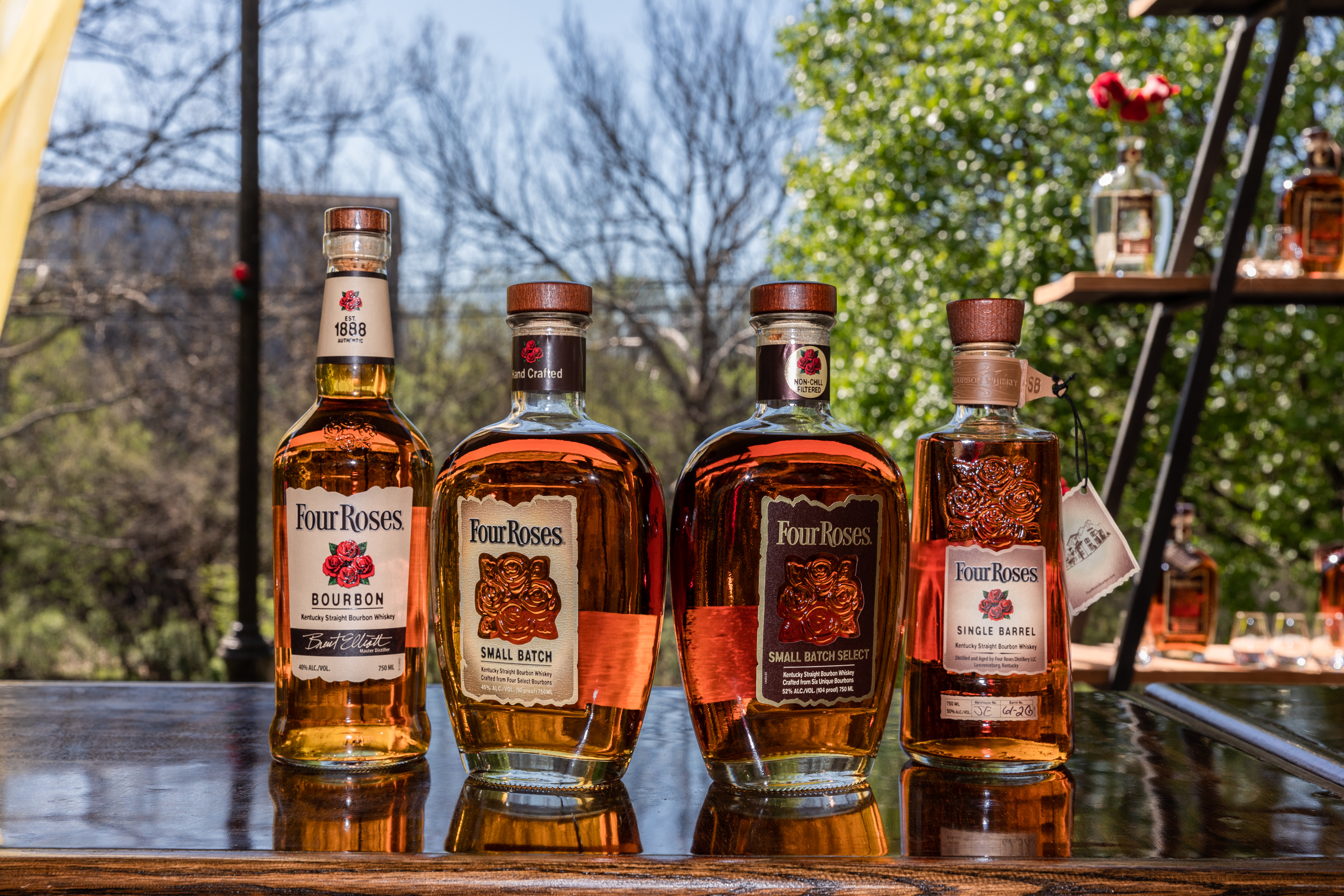
Brand expressions

The company distills ten separate bourbons using two mash recipes and five yeast strains. From combining these ten bourbons, the Four Roses distillery creates their standard bourbon. The single barrel bottlings are made with only one of those ten bourbons. The brand's regular bottlings are:

- Four Roses Bourbon: 80 U.S. proof; sold in U.S., Canada, Europe and Japan
- Four Roses Small Batch: 90 proof; sold in U.S., Canada and Europe
- Four Roses Single Barrel: 100 proof; sold in U.S., Canada, Europe, and in small volumes in Japan
- Four Roses Small Batch Select: 104 proof; aged at least six years; non-chill-filtered; sold in U.S. and Canada
- Four Roses Black: 80 proof; sold in Japan
- Four Roses Super Premium: 86 proof; sold in Japan

The company also produces special limited-production commemorative releases. These are often non-chill-filtered and bottled at barrel proof.

== Awards and accolades ==
- Four Roses Small Batch
  - World Whiskies Awards 2019 – Gold Medal – Taste
  - Whiskey Magazine Editor's Choice August–September 2015
- Four Roses Single Barrel
  - World Whiskies Awards 2019 – Gold Medal – Taste
- Four Roses 130th Anniversary 2018 Limited Edition Small Batch
  - World Whiskies Awards 2019 – World's Best Bourbon and Best Kentucky Bourbon

== See also ==
- List of historic whiskey distilleries
