= Martha Schwartz =

American landscape architect and educator

- Born: Martha Schwartz; November 21, 1950 (age 75); Philadelphia, Pennsylvania, United States
- Education: University of Michigan
- Occupation: Architect
- Spouse: Peter Walker (1979-2000)
- Partner: Markus Jatsch
- Children: 3
- Practice: Martha Schwartz Partners
- Website: www.msp.world

Martha Schwartz (born November 21, 1950) is an American landscape architect and educator. Schwartz is the founding principal of Martha Schwartz Partners, a landscape architecture firm based in London, New York City, and Shanghai. She was for a time Professor in Practice of Landscape Architecture at the Harvard University Graduate School of Design.

== Career ==
Born in Philadelphia to noted architect Milton Schwartz and his first wife Stella Wasserman. Schwartz received a Bachelor of Fine Arts degree from the Penny W. Stamps School of Art & Design at the University of Michigan in 1973. After undertaking graduate studies at Michigan, she spent time at the Graduate School of Design but returned to Michigan to receive her master's degree in landscape architecture in 1977. During a summer internship at SWA Group, Schwartz advanced her interest in landscape architecture beginning a relationship with her future husband Peter Walker . Her career was launched in 1979 by her first project, The Bagel Garden, a decorative response to her front yard in Boston.

In 1980, Schwartz began her own landscape architecture firm, Martha Schwartz Partners, intending to challenge the traditional ideals in the field of landscape architecture, and further investigate the connections between the arts, culture, and landscape. She was formerly Professor in Practice of Landscape Architecture at Harvard University. She was also a resident of the American Academy in Rome in 1993.

== Personal life ==
In 1979, Schwartz married her mentor, noted landscape architect Peter Walker, the couple divorced in 2000. They had two sons.

== Notable works ==
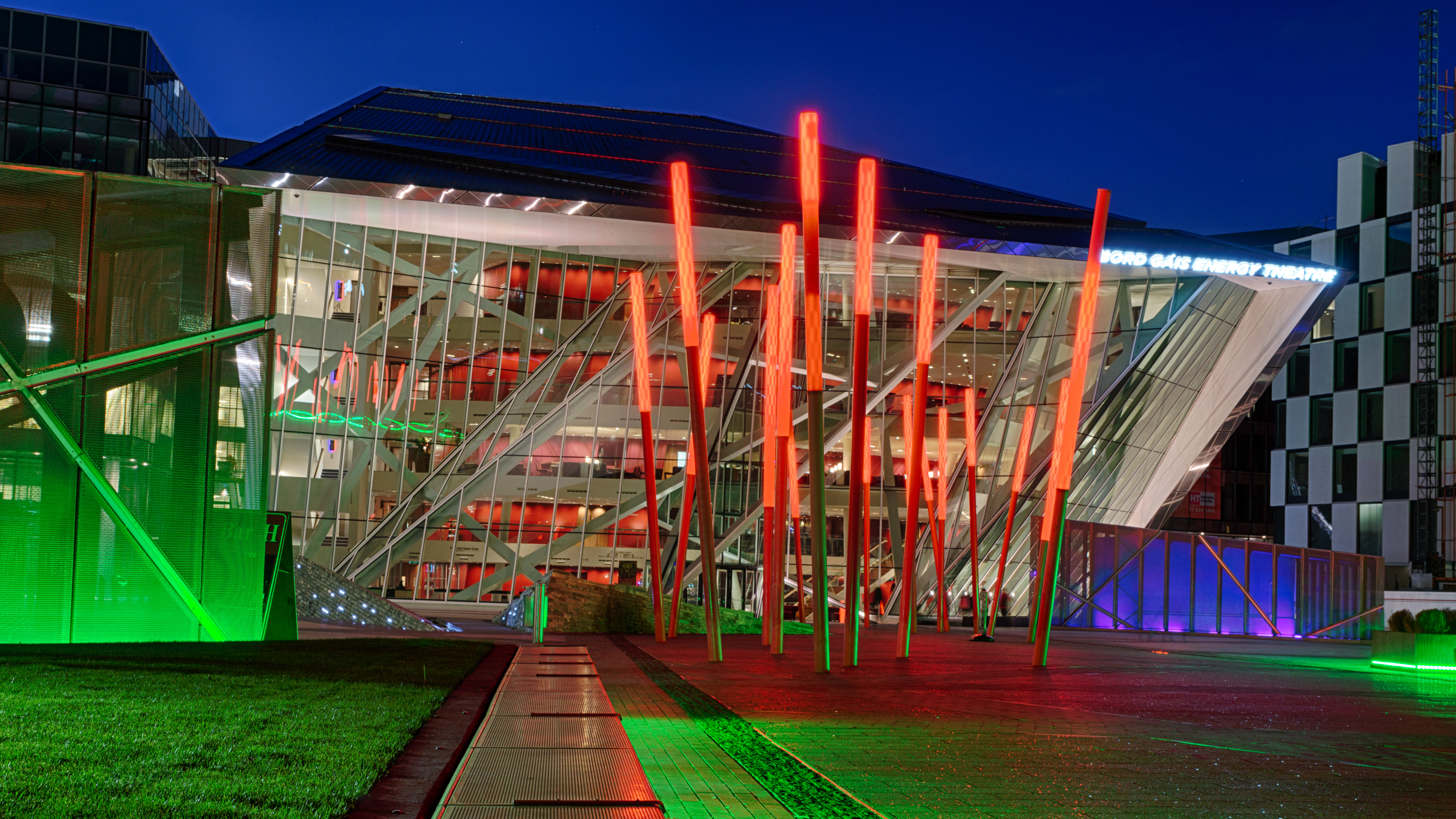
Schwartz designed the plaza in front of the Bord Gáis Energy Theatre.

- Grand Canal Square Plaza, Bord Gáis Energy Theatre, Dublin, Ireland (2008)
- Rio Shopping Center, Atlanta, GA, United States (1988)
- Plaza, King County Courthouse, Seattle, United States (1987)
- Splice Garden, Whitehead Institute, Cambridge, United States (1986)
- Bagel Garden, Boston, United States (1979).
