= Rufus M. Rose House =

Historic house in Georgia, United States

- U.S. National Register of Historic Places
- Atlanta Landmark Building
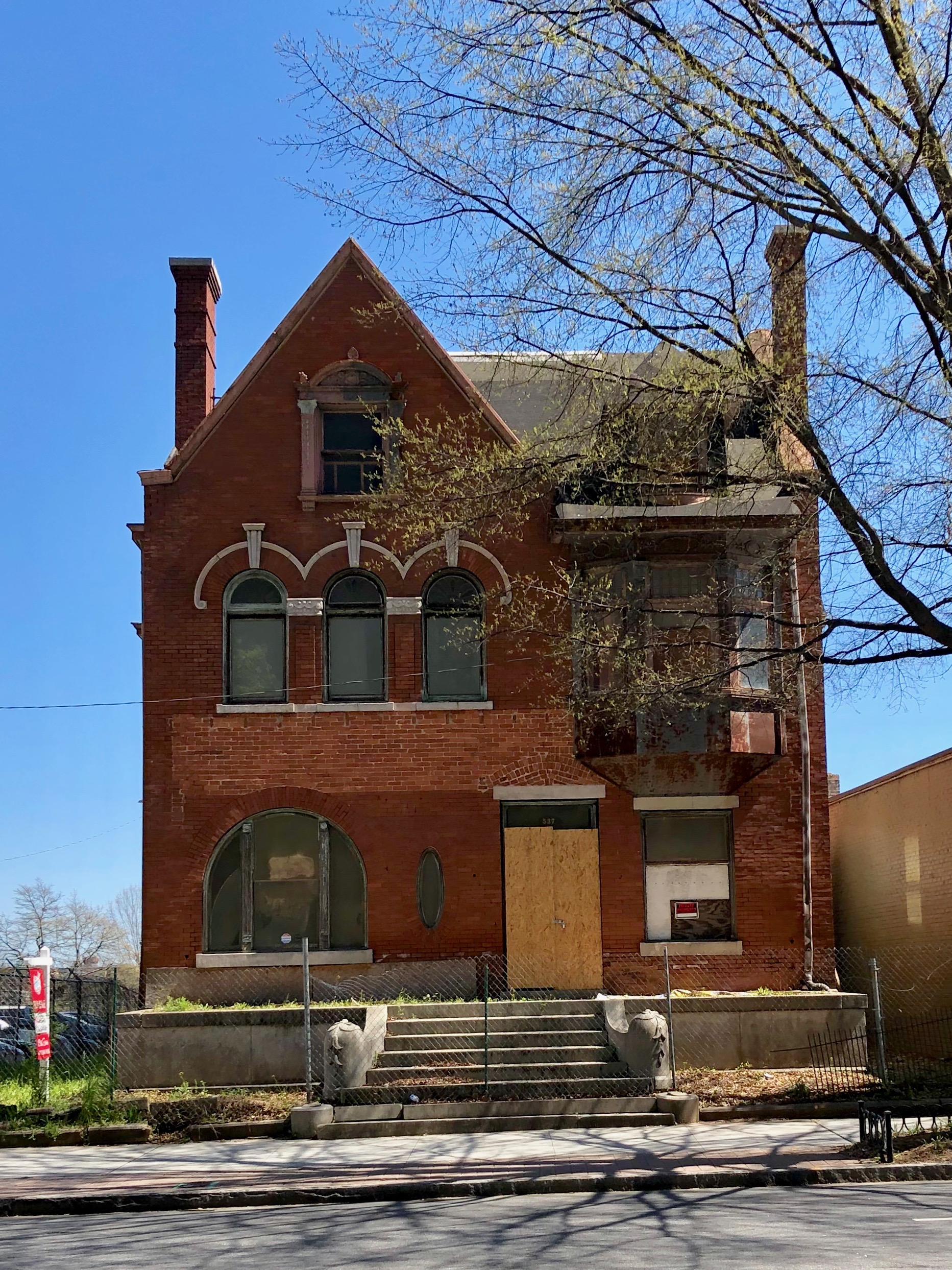
- Rufus M. Rose House on Peachtree Street

- Location within Atlanta Location within Georgia Location within the United States
- Location: 537 Peachtree St., Atlanta, Georgia
- Coordinates: 33°46′09″N 84°23′06″W
- Area: less than one acre
- Built: 1901
- Architect: Emil Charles Seiz
- Architectural style: Late Victorian/Queen Anne
- NRHP reference No.: 77000433

Significant dates
- Added to NRHP: September 20, 1977
- Designated ALB: October 23, 1989

The Rufus M. Rose House is a late Victorian, Queen Anne style house located in the SoNo district of Atlanta, Georgia. Occupying a narrow lot on Peachtree Street, one and a half blocks south of North Avenue, the house was built in 1901 for Dr. Rufus Mathewson Rose. The architect was Emil Charles Seiz (1873–1940), who designed many residential and commercial structures in the city, including the 1924 Massellton Apartments on Ponce de Leon Avenue.

== Architecture ==
The house is an extremely rare example of a nineteenth-century town house built for one of Atlanta's wealthy citizens. Its red-brick exterior consists of bayed and multi-gabled facades interspersed with numerous window shapes and sizes, and numerous fireplaces. The original slate roof and front porch have been lost.

Additionally, the property has carved, marble steps that originally ascended directly from the sidewalk on Peachtree Street up to the front porch. The home's tiny yard is the "singular survivor from Peachtree's residential heyday."

== History ==
The approximately 5,200-square-foot (480 m^{2}) home was built for Dr. Rufus M. Rose in 1901 at a cost of $9,000.

Rose, a former druggist and Civil War doctor who moved to Atlanta in 1867, was the founder of the R. M. Rose Co. Distillery (Mountain Spring Distillery), located in the Atlanta suburb of Vinings, as well as the owner of a large real estate business known as the Rose Investment Company. The Rose family lived in this home until 1921.

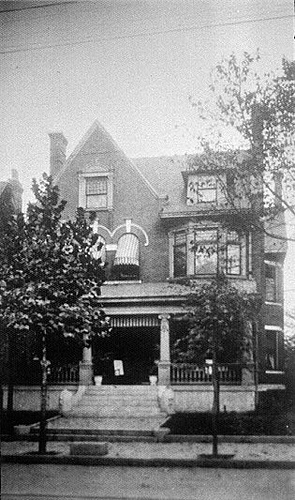
Rufus M. Rose House in 1903. Notice the mounting block at the curb.

From 1923, when the property was sold out of the Rose family, until the mid-1940s, the home was used as a private residence, then as a rooming house, then as offices for the Fulton County Relief Administration, then, once again, as a private residence.

In 1945, James H. Elliot Sr. bought the house and used it as an antique store and museum, which he named J.H. Elliot's Antiques and the Atlanta Museum. Open to the public, the museum contained furniture belonging to Margaret Mitchell, personal items of Bobby Jones, Ethiopian Emperor Haile Selassie's throne, a Japanese Zero war plane and many other notable items. After more than 50 years, the store and museum closed in 1998.

From 1999 to 2001, the house served as the headquarters for the Atlanta Preservation Center until it moved into L. P. Grant's antebellum mansion in Atlanta's Grant Park neighborhood.

While the house is listed on the National Register of Historic Places (1977) and is designated as a Landmark Building Exterior (1989) by the City of Atlanta, it is currently vacant and endangered due to neglect.

The house was sold for a price of $309,750 on August 24, 2011, to an individual by the name of Gholam Bakhtiari at an auction held by the real estate firm Williams & Williams.

Vacant since 2001, the house was sold in 2020 to Inman Park Properties before being sold again to UC Asset, an Atlanta-based real estate investment firm, in 2021. Renovations on the property began in September 2021, though developers have not yet announced future plans for the property.
