= SciTrek =

- Science & Technology Museum of Atlanta
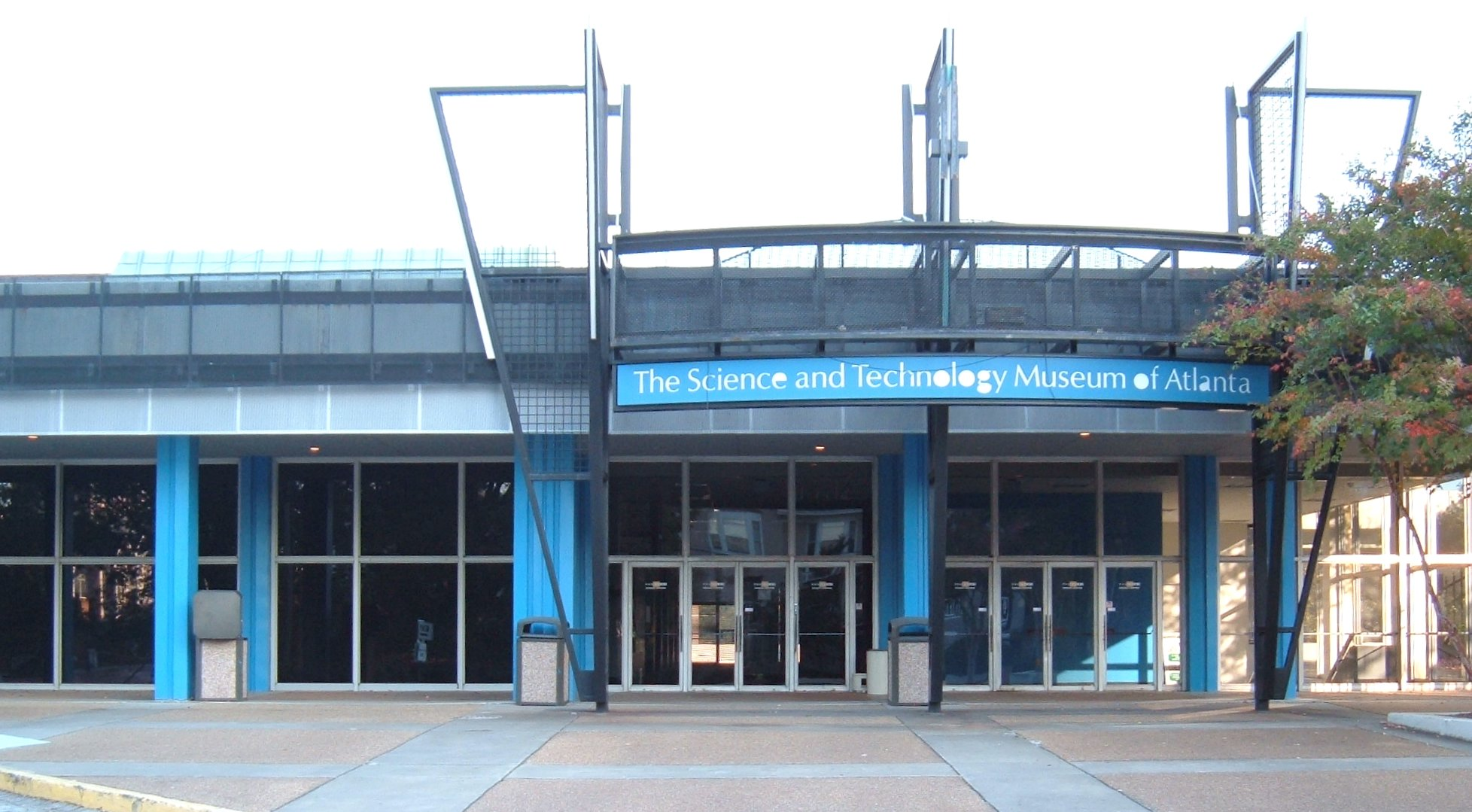
- Museum entrance

- Former location of SciTrek in Metro Atlanta SciTrek (Georgia) SciTrek (the United States)
- Established: October 29, 1988
- Dissolved: August 27, 2004
- Location: 395 Piedmont Avenue North East; Atlanta, Georgia 30308 USA
- Coordinates: 33.766°N 84.3816°W
- Type: Children's Science & Technology Museum
- Collection size: 140 exhibits appealing to all age ranges
- Director: Scott Coleman
- President: Lewis A. Massey

The Science & Technology Museum of Atlanta, usually known as SciTrek, was located at 395 Piedmont Avenue (33.766°N 84.3816°W) in Atlanta, Georgia, next to the Atlanta Civic Center. It was open from 1988 to 2004, when severe funding cuts forced its permanent closure and the dispersal of its assets.

== History ==
=== From concept to reality ===
In 1982, Mary O'Connor and Sue Trotter, fellow Junior Leaguers and longtime neighbors in Brookwood Hills, decided to pursue a science museum for Atlanta.

SciTrek was incorporated in 1982, with an initial grant from the Metropolitan Foundation. The Metropolitan Foundation is a nonprofit corporation guided by a 31-member board of directors headed by Robert W. Scherer, the Georgia Power Co. chairman and chief executive officer.

With help from the city of Atlanta, the city committed 96,000 square feet (8,900 m^{2}) of the Atlanta Civic Center exhibition space to the Science and Technology Museum of Atlanta. The Robert W. Woodruff Foundation donated $1 million. After years of planning and fundraising SciTrek-The Science & Technology Museum of Atlanta finally opened its doors to the public on October 29, 1988.

=== The early years ===
SciTrek opened with 34 staffers, 150 volunteers, and a $2.5 million annual budget. During the three-day grand opening, 11,000 visitors toured the museum. By the end of its first full fiscal year, SciTrek reported 350,000 visitors to the museum. Museum organizers projected attendance would eventually reach 1 million.

In 1991, SciTrek reported more than 750,000 visitors, most of whom were schoolchildren. In April 1997, Gwen Crider, former deputy director of the Smithsonian Institution's National Air and Space Museum, replaced Gene Brandt as president and executive director of SciTrek. In the October 2001 issue of Good Housekeeping magazine, SciTrek was named one of the country's 10 best science museums.

Even after suffering a 24% drop-off in visitors between 1993 through 1999, SciTrek decided during the 1999 fiscal year to retire its long-standing debt of $3 million. On December 1, 2000, Lewis A. Massey, former Georgia secretary of state, took over as SciTrek president and chief executive officer.

=== Troubled years ===
By January 2001, SciTrek's finances were in dire condition, having lost $80,000 to $100,000 a month over the previous six months. The museum had a deficit for the previous three years, reaching $700,000 for fiscal 2000. The board extended a 90-day reprieve for SciTrek instead of closing it down immediately. By June 2001, the State of Georgia, which had provided an annual $175,000 grant to SciTrek, threw in an additional $300,000 to help keep the museum afloat. During August 2002 the following year the Georgia Assembly allocated $425,000 to SciTrek and began a capital campaign to help raise $5 million.

In January 2003, the Challenger Learning Center, a $1.7 million simulated space shuttle mission, opened to the public. In December 2003, SciTrek named technology industry executive, Scott Coleman, as president and CEO, replacing Massey, who left to join a lobbying firm. In June 2003, the Georgia Department of Education budget for the 2004 fiscal year cut funding for SciTrek by 10 percent.

SciTrek was forced to close in August 2004 due to reduced federal and state funding. All of its displays were sold or auctioned on January 15, 2005. Some of the assets, such as the Challenger Learning Center, were transferred to Fernbank Science Center, also in Atlanta.

== Exhibits ==
SciTrek once housed more than 140 exhibits appealing to all age ranges. The interactive displays offered visitors the opportunity to explore and discover the marvels of the scientific world, with a special KidSpace section (originally based upon the Kidspace exhibit area at COSI) specially designed for 2 to 7 year olds. The Mathematica: A World of Numbers... and Beyond exhibit detailed the major achievements in the history of mathematics from the twelfth century as well as explaining mathematical formulae including Kepler's laws of planetary motion and probability theory. Other exhibits focused on electricity generation in unusual ways, creating energy from magnetism, "freezing shadows", or stepping inside a kaleidoscope.

== Programs and facilities ==
=== Challenger Learning Center ===
SciTrek's Challenger Learning Center was a $1.7 million, simulated NASA space shuttle mission which opened to the public in January 2003. Upon SciTrek's initial closure, the Challenger Learning Center was put up for auction. Several museums and science centers expressed interest in acquiring the Challenger Learning Center for their facility. None of the entrusted facilities or museums were able to come up with the purchasing cost of $1.7 million. As a result, Challenger Learning Center, with its advanced computers and flight technology, was almost sent to the scrap yard.

Turner Broadcasting System stepped in and raised the money needed to purchase SciTrek's Challenger Learning Center, which was relocated and donated to Atlanta's Fernbank Science Center. SciTrek's name, intellectual property, computers, materials from the Edison exhibit, science education curriculum and programs were transferred to Valdosta State University in 2005. The new SciTrek is closed to the public, but serves as an educational center for teachers and students in South Georgia.

=== STARS ===
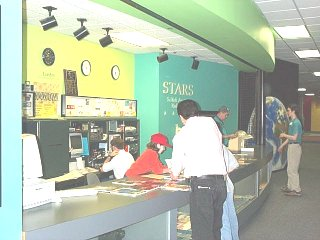
The W4WOW amateur radio station

STARS: SciTrek Amateur Radio Society operated W4WOW, an amateur radio station located in SciTrek. STARS operated on CW, SSB, FM, and PSK-31 frequencies along with others. The frequency bands most often used by the group were HF, UHF, and VHF.

When SciTrek was in operation, the group met on the first Sunday of every month at the ham radio station in the museum.

=== Tech High ===
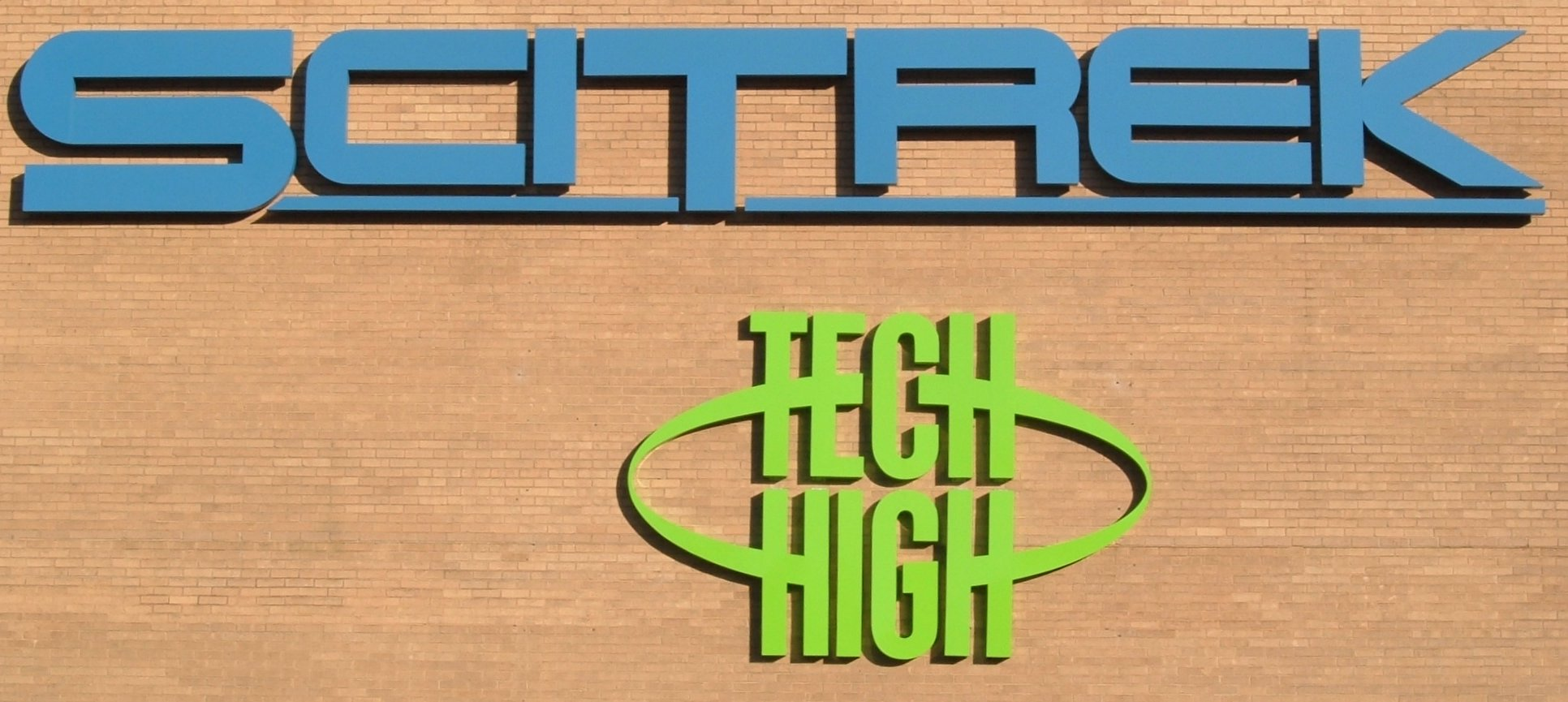
Tech High logo

In August 2004, the charter school Tech High opened inside the SciTrek Civic Center building. The school was a public-private hybrid.
