= Atlanta Civic Center =

Closed theater in Atlanta, Georgia

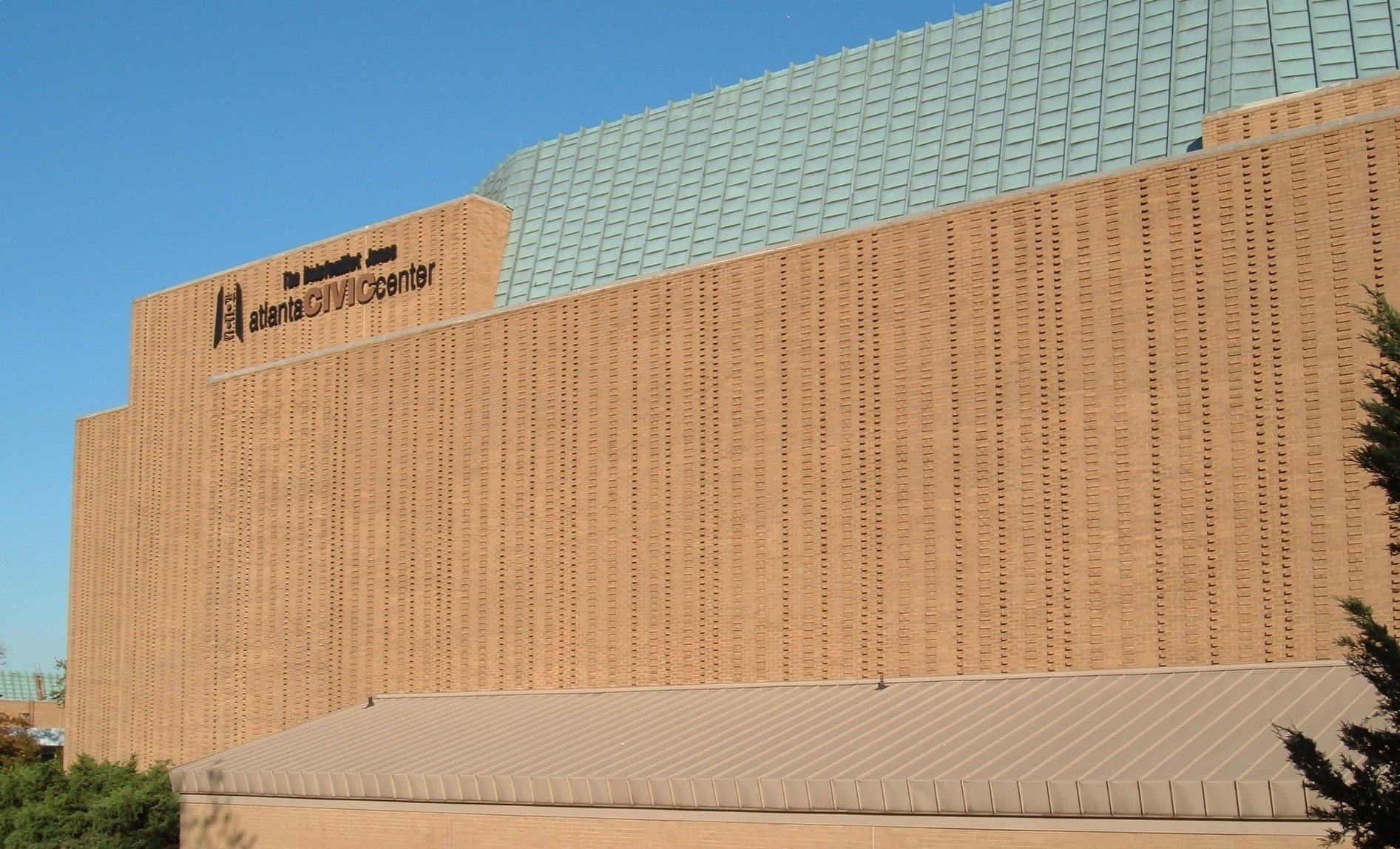

- Location within Atlanta Location within Georgia Location within the United States
- Full name: Boisfeuillet Jones Atlanta Civic Center
- Former names: Atlanta Civic Center (1967–2001)
- Coordinates: 33.76699°N 84.38157°W
- Owner: City of Atlanta
- Operator: City of Atlanta's Department of Parks, Recreation and Cultural Affairs
- Seating type: Theater
- Capacity: 4,600 seats
- Type: Civic Center/Theater

Construction
- Built: 1967; 59 years ago
- Renovated: 2001 at a cost of $2 million
- Closed: October 21, 2014

Tenants
- SciTrek (1988–2004); Family Feud (2011–2015)

Website
- atlantaciviccenter.com

The Atlanta Civic Center was a theater located in Atlanta, Georgia. The theater, which seats 4,600, regularly hosted touring productions of Broadway musicals, concerts, seminars, comedy acts, and high school graduations and commencement ceremonies for Atlanta's John Marshall Law School. In addition to performances, the civic center could host conferences and exhibits as well, with 5,800 square feet (540 m^{2}) of meeting space. The civic center was owned and operated by the Atlanta city government's Department of Parks, Recreation and Cultural Affairs, but brought in enough revenue to be self-supporting. The theater closed in 2014, and the property was sold to the Atlantic Housing Authority in 2017 for redevelopment.

== History ==
The Atlanta Civic Center was built in 1967 on the site of Ripley Street and part of Currier Street in the Buttermilk Bottom community. It was partly built as the city's convention center, but was quickly superseded in 1976 by the state-run Georgia World Congress Center. It once hosted the annual Spring Tour of the Metropolitan Opera and served as the home of "Theatre of the Stars", a summer series of Broadway musicals featuring well-known stars of the entertainment industry. The Balanchine production of "The Nutcracker" was performed there annually for several years. The Civic Center also served as the site for the 1996 Summer Olympics cultural program.

On July 1st, 1999, Britney Spears played to a sold out crowd as part of her ...Baby One More Time Tour.

In 2000, it hosted the Jeopardy! Tournament of Champions with Georgian Robin Carroll winning.

The Atlanta Civic Center underwent a $2 million renovation in 2001 and added "Boisfeuillet Jones" to its name in honor of Atlanta businessman and philanthropist Boisfeuillet Jones, Sr. In 2003, the Civic Center became the host for the Atlanta Opera, which moved to the Cobb Energy Center in suburban Cobb County in 2007.

The back parking lot was where the 99x stage was located during the Music Midtown Festival. During the 2002 festival, Turner South hosted an indoor televised concert.

On July 22, 2005, it hosted President George W. Bush when he spoke to an invitation-only crowd about changes in Medicare. He was introduced by Governor Sonny Perdue and also accompanied by his mother Barbara Bush and U.S. senators Saxby Chambliss and Johnny Isakson.

In May 2007 it was revealed that the city was considering demolition of the facility, in addition to the neighboring SciTrek, replacing them with a new performing arts center. SciTrek did close, but the Civic Center remained in operation.

In 2008, the Peachtree Road Race stage and finish festival were moved here when Piedmont Park was deemed off-limits because of drought conditions, as were other large events normally held in Piedmont Park such as Atlanta Pride. On October 18, 2008, the center hosted the 2008 BET Hip Hop Awards.

In April 2011, in honor of the Atlanta Georgia Temple rededication, over 2,000 youth of the Church of Jesus Christ of Latter-day Saints (LDS Church) performed in a youth cultural celebration entitled "Southern Lights". Church president Thomas S. Monson enjoyed the performance along with other Church leaders, including Elder M. Russell Ballard, Walter F. González and William R. Walker.

Family Feud taped at the Atlanta Civic Center from 2011 to 2015, before moving to the Georgia World Congress Center.

In March 2022, the Atlanta Housing Authority was seeking a developer to transform and repurpose the 19-acre site. However, the engagement and withdrawal of development companies has slowed down progress.
