= Donnell Fire =

2018 wildfire in Central California

- Part of the 2018 California wildfires
- Date: August 1, 2018 –; November 28, 2018
- Location: California, United States
- Coordinates: 38°21′N 119°56′W

Statistics
- Burned area: 36,450 acres (148 km^{2})

Impacts
- Deaths: None reported
- Injuries: 9
- Structures destroyed: 135
- Cost: >$30.3 million (2018 USD)

Ignition
- Cause: Unattended Illegal Campfire

Map
- Location of fire in California

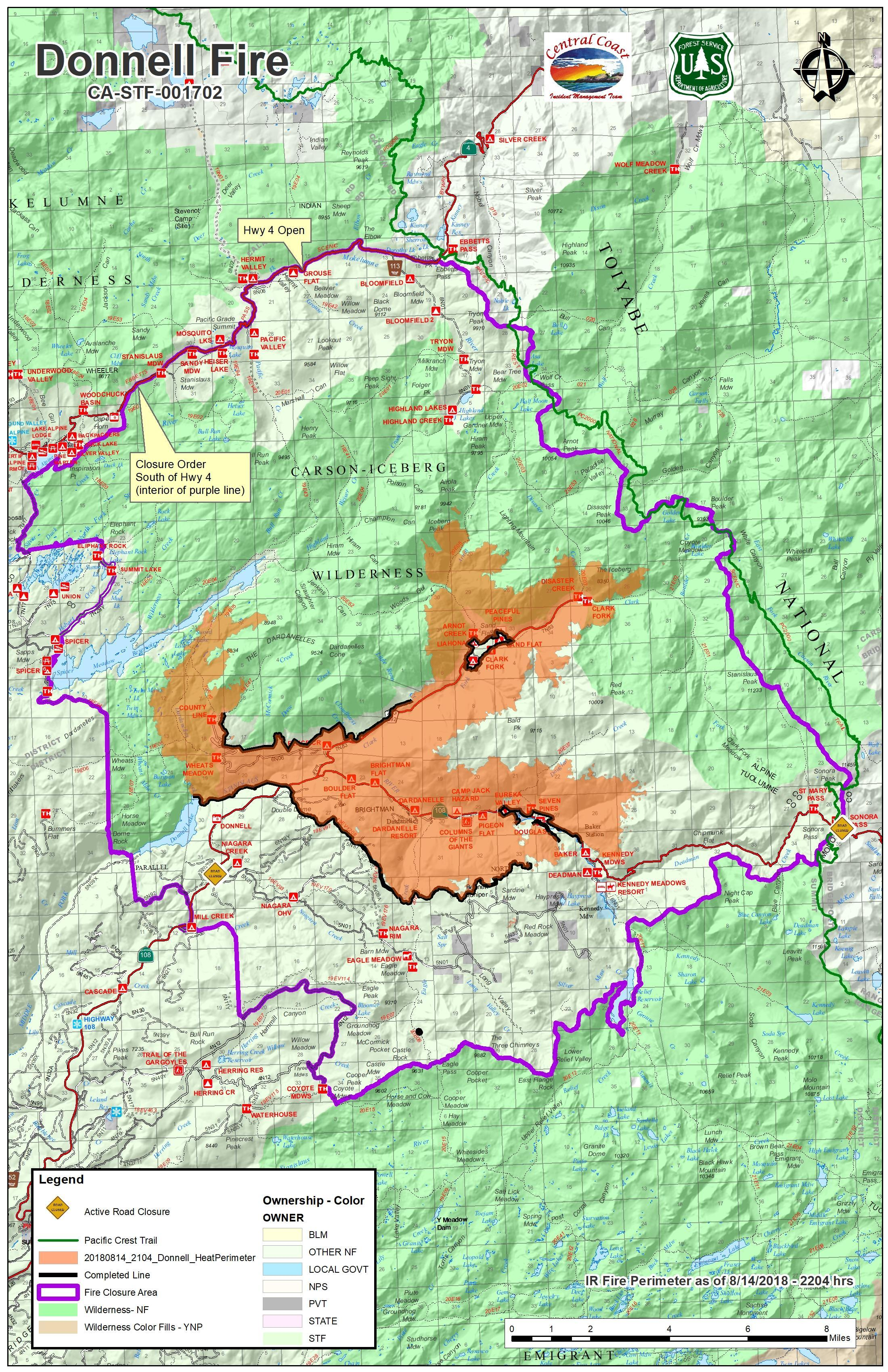
Map showing burned areas (orange), containment lines (black), and fire closure area (bounded by purple line) on August 14, 2018. The Dardanelle Resort is on Highway 108 in just south of the center of the image; the Bennet Juniper is southeast a few miles, near the fire front.

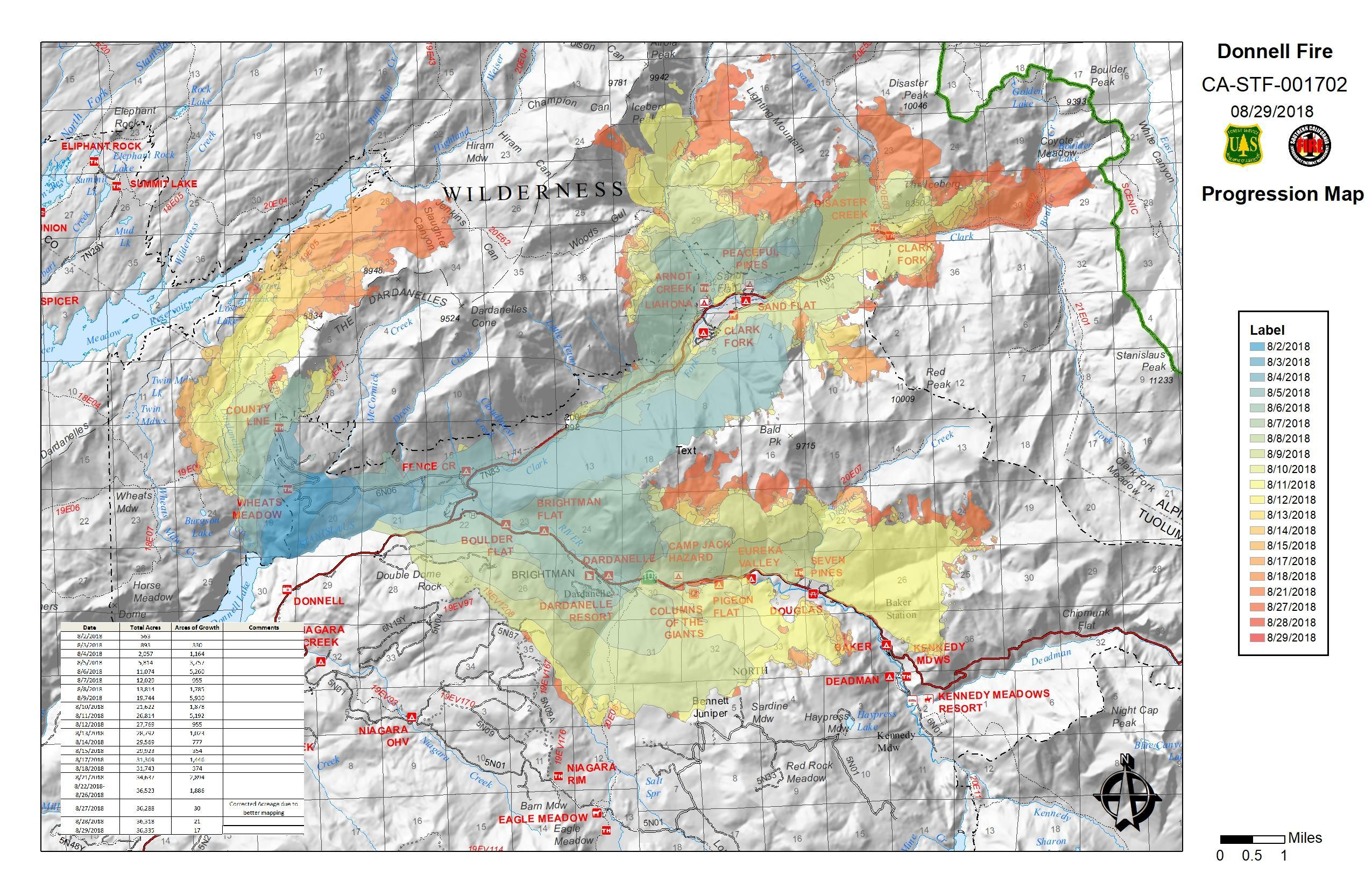
Map showing daily progression of fire August 2–29, 2018.

The Donnell Fire was a wildfire that started on August 1, 2018, due to an unattended illegal campfire, near Donnell Reservoir, burning around California State Route 108 in Tuolumne County, California and in the Stanislaus National Forest. It spread rapidly, and the Forest Service closed a California state highway, many forest service roads, campgrounds, wilderness areas, access to privately owned inholdings, and the Pacific Crest Trail. The fire burned 36,450 acres (147.5 km^{2}), and destroyed 54 major structures and 81 minor structures, before the fire burned out on October 1. There were nine injuries caused by the fire, but no deaths.

Among the destroyed buildings were those of the historic Dardanelle Resort and the 1933 Dardanelle Bridge a unique bridge listed on the Historic American Engineering Record. Both were at Dardanelle, an unincorporated community on California State Route 108, the highway to Sonora Pass.

The ancient Bennett Juniper was threatened by the fire, which came within half a mile, but the fire front stabilized after sustained ground and air attacks, and by the evening of August 14, it was no longer advancing toward the tree.

On October 1, 2018, InciWeb reported minimal fire activity. The fire was declared 100% contained on November 28, 2018.

== See also ==
- 2018 California wildfires
