= Bennett Juniper =

Largest juniper tree in the United States

Coordinates: 38°18′34″N 119°47′49.56″W

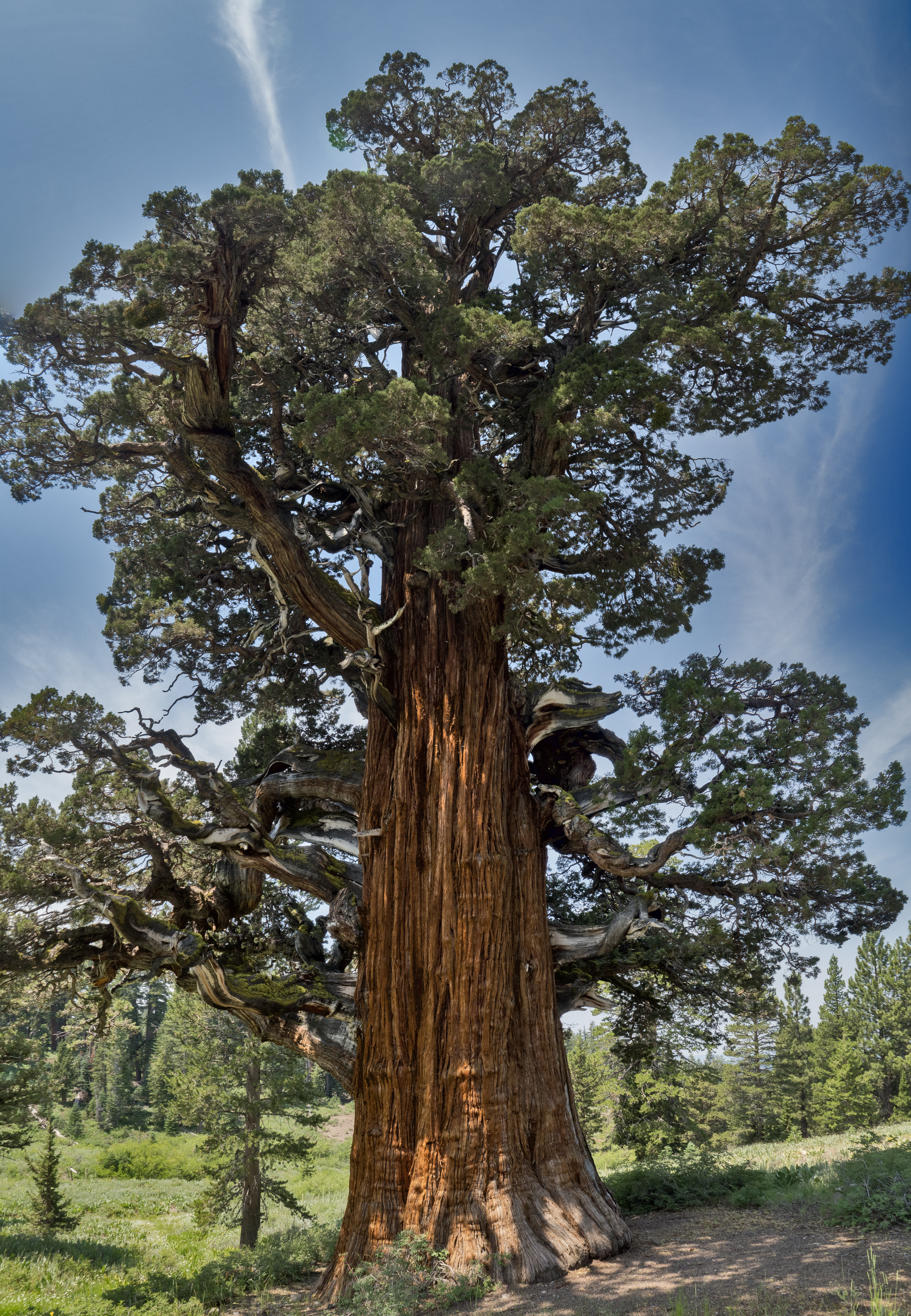
South side of the Bennett Juniper

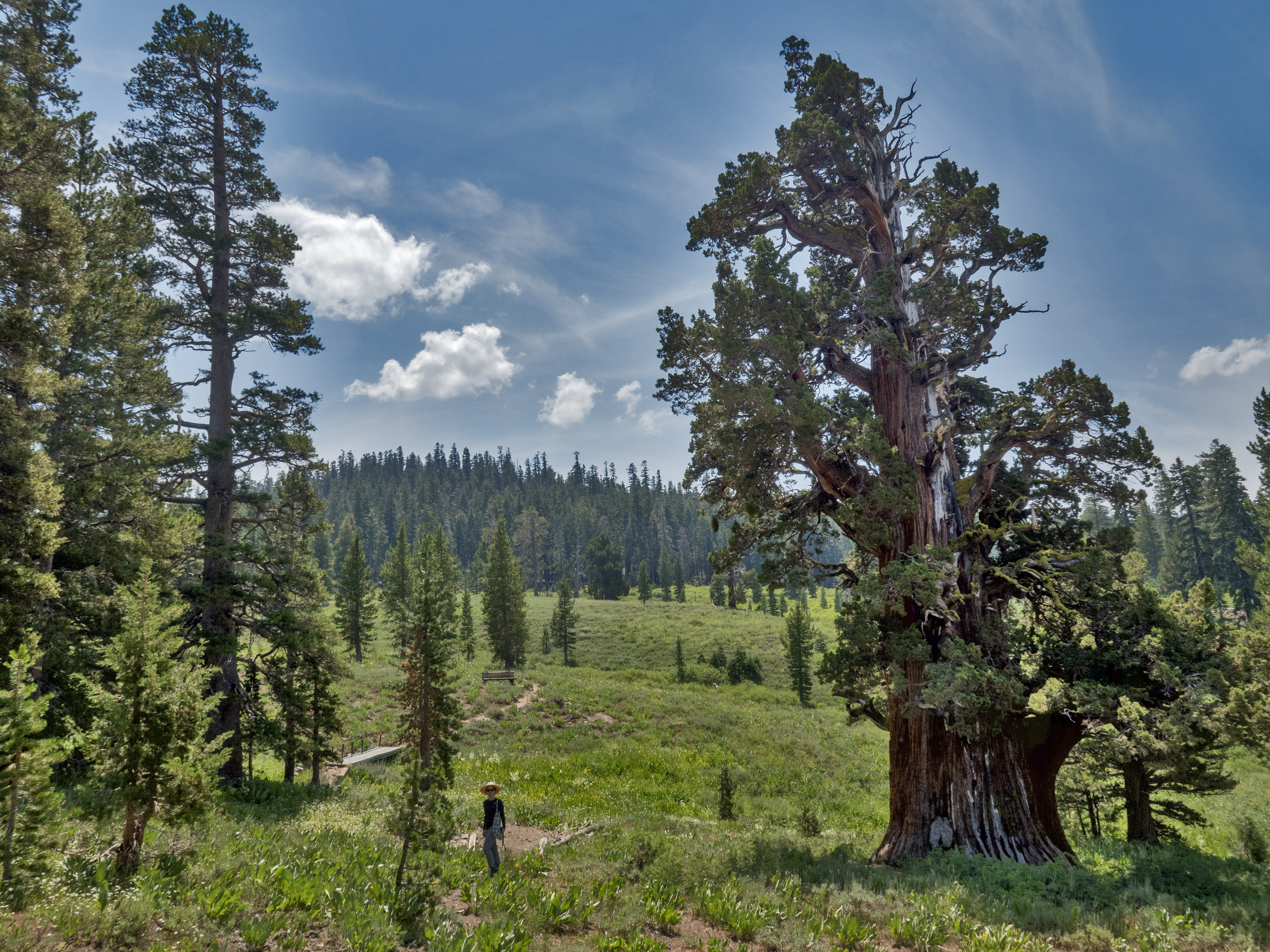
North side of the Bennett Juniper with a person for scale near the tree.

The Bennett Juniper is the largest known juniper tree in the United States. It is located in Section 5, Township 5 North, Range 20 east of the Mount Diablo meridian, on an inholding in the Stanislaus National Forest in Tuolumne County, California. The tree is currently owned by the Mother Lode Land Trust, a regional land trust organization.

== Species ==
Originally, the Bennett was considered to be a western juniper (Juniperus occidentalis). Over time the differences between the northern and southern populations of western junipers justified dividing them into two subspecies, and the Bennett is considered to be in the southern population which was named Juniperus occidentalis australis. A field guide published by UC Press in 2001 gives the common name Mountain Juniper for the australis population. DNA studies (2006) by Adams resulted in the southern population being raised to species status, and it was given the common name “grand juniper” (Juniperus grandis). This name and status are recognized in the USDA Plant Database.

== Age ==
The longevity of the Bennett is enigmatic, and the tree has been the subject of several attempts to determine its age. As reported in Madroño, the tree was cored in the 1930s by Glock and he estimated the age as about 3,000 years old. The tree was cored again in 1989 by Peter Brown from the University of Arizona Tree Ring Lab at the request of the former owners of the Bennett, Save the Redwoods League. His estimate based on a short sample was the age was also almost 3,000 years. During this coring it was discovered that rotten wood was reached about 2 feet (0.61 m) into the tree and that the tree was also partially hollow. As a result there will never be a definitive result from a complete core sample.

The naturalist Clarence K. Bennett - after whom the tree is named - believed the tree to be over 6,000 years old. His conclusion was based upon extrapolations of measurements taken either from core samples or cross-sections of nearby trees. An example is a cross-section from a downed juniper about 200 feet (61 m) away which was 16 inches (41 cm) in diameter and 800 years old. About 10 miles (16 km) away is the Scofield Juniper stump which is about 6 feet (1.8 m) in diameter and 2700 years old by ring count. A major issue with the extrapolation method is that the Bennett has some access to water in a drainage which is unusual in this area for junipers.

== Size ==
The Bennett Juniper's height is 78 feet (24 m) feet with an average crown spread of 56 feet (17 m). The diameter at breast height (4.5 feet (1.4 m) above ground) is 12.7 feet (3.9 m). This gives it a total of 573 points by the American Forests formula for measuring "Big Trees", and by that measure the Bennett is the largest juniper of any type listed in the National Register of Big Trees.

== Location ==
The Bennett Juniper grows on Sardine Meadow, an open area at 8,400 feet (2,600 m) elevation just off the top of a ridgeline. The site was heavily glaciated during the last ice age stripping the site of any previous soils. Current soils vary between 6 inches (15 cm) and 24 inches (61 cm) thick and are derived from the underlying volcanic bedrock. While sitting in a dry spot, the roots on one side of the tree can reach a seasonal drainage. The area is dominated by low-growing (18 centimetres (7.1 in)) sagebrush (Artemisia tridentata) and scattered lodgepole pine (Pinus contorta murrayana) and a few juniper. Because of fire suppression since the 1950s there are more sagebrush and young trees (both lodgepole and juniper) than would be historically normal for the preserve. Once the sagebrush established its dominance very few young trees have started since 1960. There are a number of junipers within several miles whose heights, but not other dimensions, rival the Bennett. In each case they are growing on glacial till or, more commonly, a glacial moraine with much deeper soil and water availability.

== Human history ==
The Native Americans certainly visited this area in the summer time, though no specific history regarding the tree is known. Within a half mile (.8 km) of the preserve are five locations with bedrock mortars and several spots where obsidian (often used for tools) was worked. The earliest known sighting, probably in the 1920s, of the Bennett was by Basque sheepherders who described a huge juniper to their employer, Ed Burgson, a local Tuolumne County sheep rancher. The naturalist Clarence Bennett, who had traveled throughout the Sierra studying junipers, connected with Burgson a few years later. This was the largest specimen that Bennett had ever seen. Bennett became a champion of getting the tree studied and protected. By the 1950s the Forest Service had named the tree after Bennett.

It quickly became apparent after a road was built into the area in the 1950s that the Bennett was going to need some protection from visitors. The first attempt was the formation of the Bennett Juniper Association, which placed a monument at the tree in 1963. Joseph W. Martin Sr., the owner of the land on which the Bennett resides, and Clarence Bennett were getting on in years and decided that establishing a formal nature preserve and transferring it to a major established conservation organization was the best method of long term protection for the Bennett. Martin carved out a 3 acres (1.2 ha) piece of land from his holdings in the area, and donated it to Nature Conservancy in 1978. The Conservancy was not in a position to manage the preserve, and the cumulative impact from an increasing number of visitors was taking its toll. John B. Dewitt, the Executive Director of Save the Redwoods League, had been a regular visitor to the Bennett for many years. He could see how the site was being degraded and foresaw irreversible damage was on the verge of happening. Although the mission of the League is to protect redwoods (Sequoia sempervirens) and not junipers, Dewitt convinced his Board of Directors that the League should acquire the property and take on the responsibility for the protection of the Bennett. Nature Conservancy transferred title to the League in 1987. The following year the League hired a summer resident steward to manage the visitation and repair previous impacts. The caretaker camped nearby.

In 2018, the Bennett was threatened by the Donnell Fire, a wildfire which advanced to within a half-mile (.8 km) of the site. A sustained effort by firefighters on the ground and in the air prevented the fire from advancing further and saved the tree.

The Bennett Juniper property is now owned and managed by Mother Lode Land Trust (MLLT). the League donated the Bennett Juniper property to MLLT in November 2022.

== See also ==
- List of individual trees
- List of oldest trees

== Sources ==
- Glock, Waldo S., "Observations on the Western Juniper", Madroño 4, No. 1 (1937): 21-28. California Botanical Society.
