= Sierra Nevada upper montane forest =

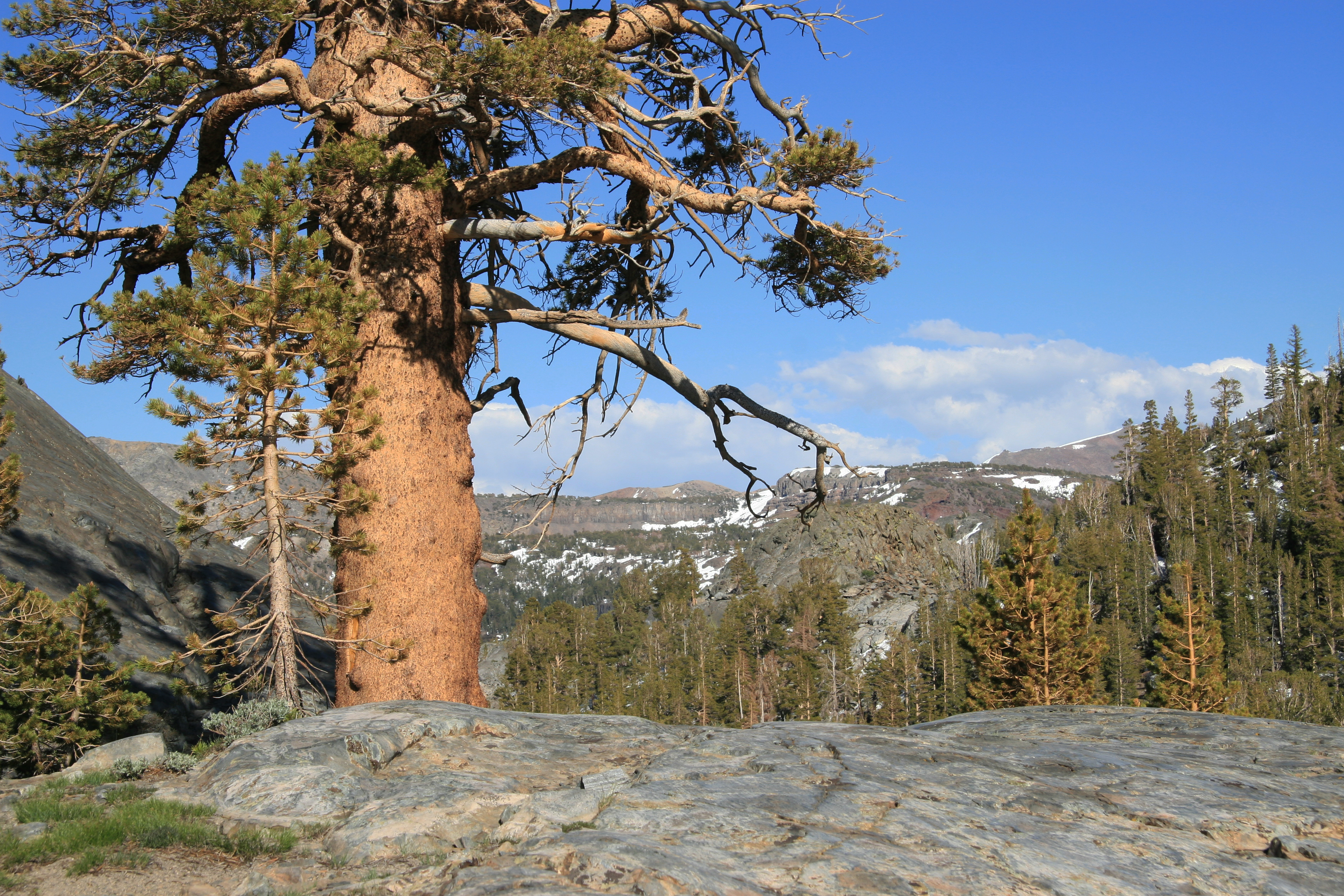
Upper montane forest in the Ansel Adams Wilderness

The Sierra Nevada upper montane forest is a vegetation type found below the treeline in the United States Sierra Nevada range. It is generally located above the mixed coniferous forest and below the alpine zone. Overstory trees are typically cone shaped to shed the snow.

Characteristic trees including lodgepole pine (Pinus contorta subsp. murrayana ), Jeffrey pine (Pinus jeffreyi), western white pine (Pinus monticola) California red fir (Abies magnifica), and Sierra juniper (Juniperus grandis), and typical understory trees and shrubs such as huckleberry oak (Quercus vaccinifolia) and red heather (Phyllodoce breweri). Montane chaparral can occur in areas with recent fires or with high exposure to wind. In the northern Sierra, quaking aspen occur in this ecoregion.

== Environment ==
On the western slopes of the Sierra Nevada range, upper montane vegetation can be found at elevations from 5,500 to 7,500 feet (1,700 to 2,300 m) in the northern part of the range, 6,500 to 8,000 feet (2,000 to 2,400 m) in the central part, and 8,000 to 10,000 feet (2,400 to 3,000 m) in the southern part. On the eastern slopes, it is at higher elevations. Precipitation in areas of upper montane forest vegetation type is 35 to 65 feet (11 to 20 m), mostly as snowfall. Summer high temperatures range from 73 to 85 °F (23 to 29 °C), and winter lows are below 26 °F (−3 °C). Growing season is about four months because of long-lasting, deep snow.

Rock types in this ecoregion are typically granitic dating from the Mesozoic or volcanic dating from the Tertiary.

== Gallery ==
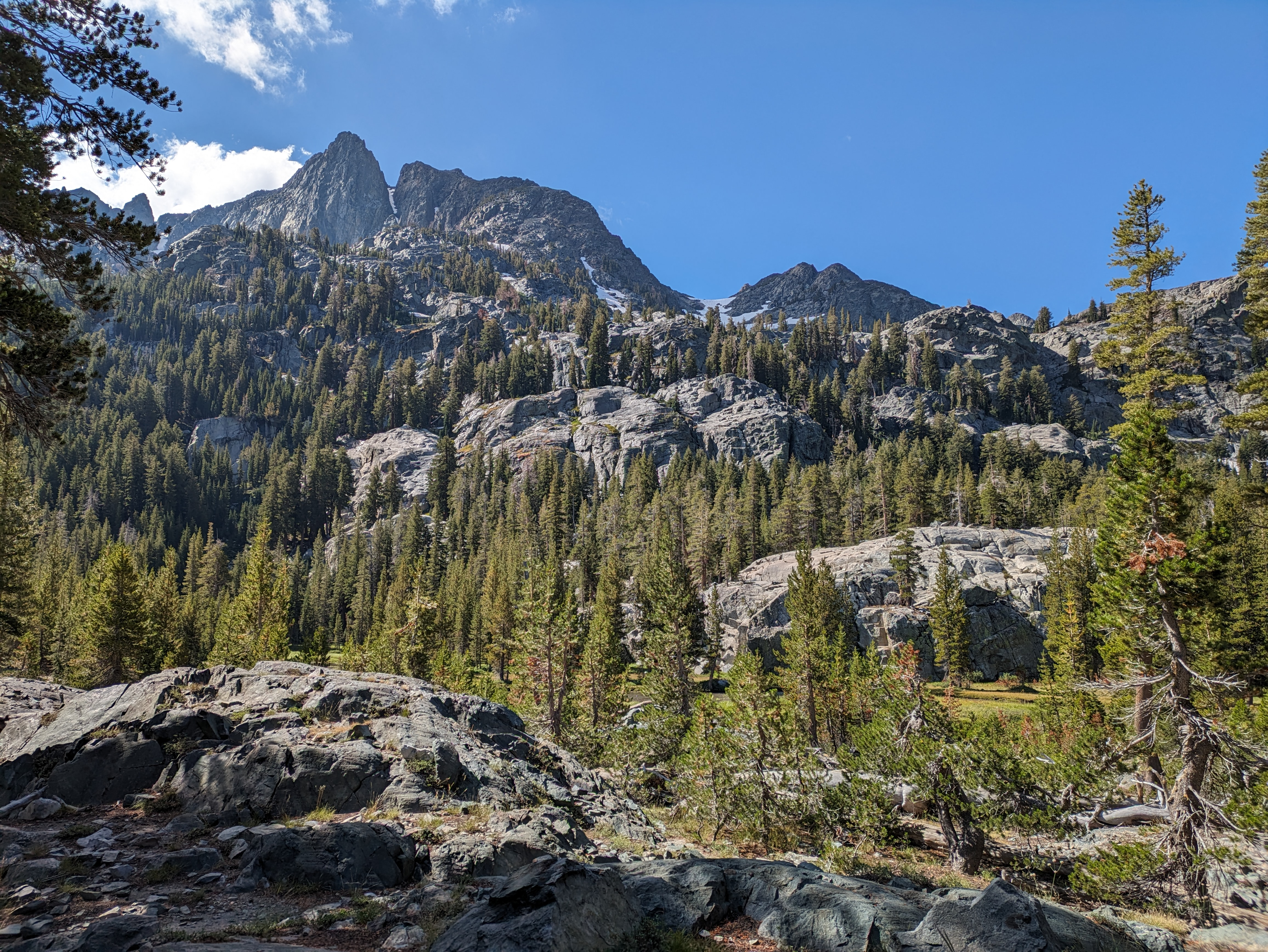
Volcanic Ridge from the north, Ansel Adams Wilderness, California

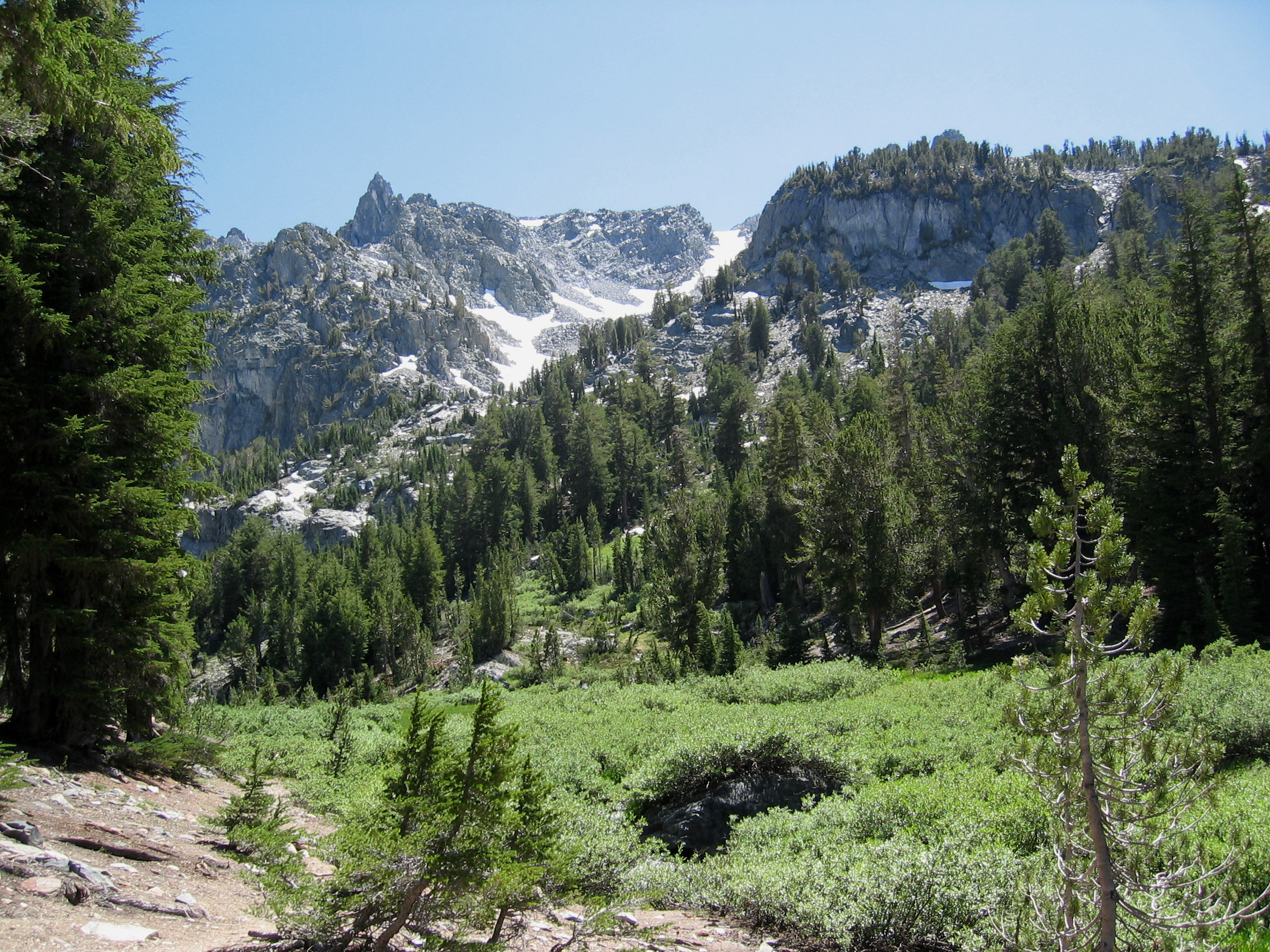
Mammoth Crest from Sky Meadows (3060m) John Muir Wilderness, California.

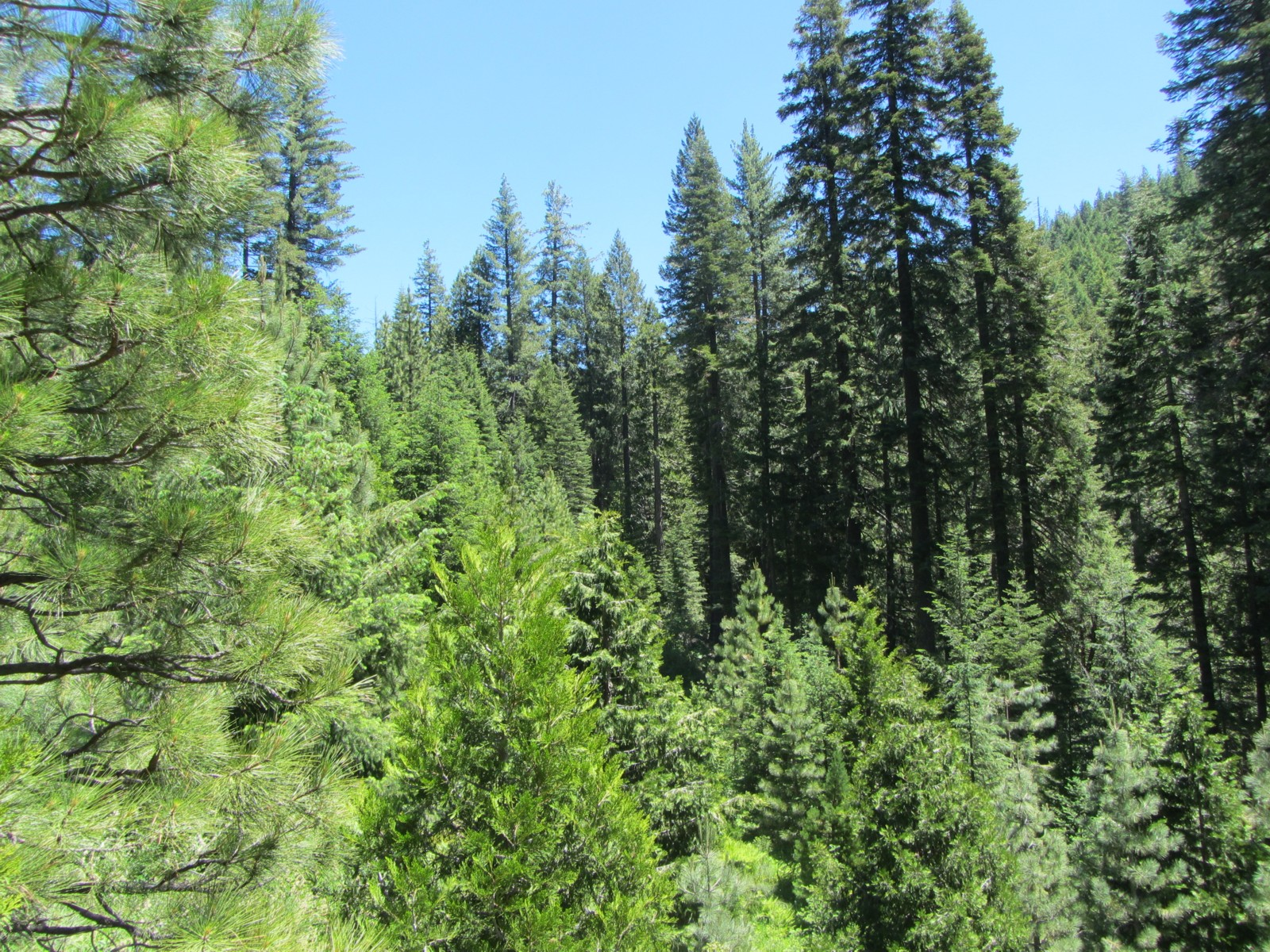
Forest in Placer County, Sierra Nevada, Tahoe National Forest, California.

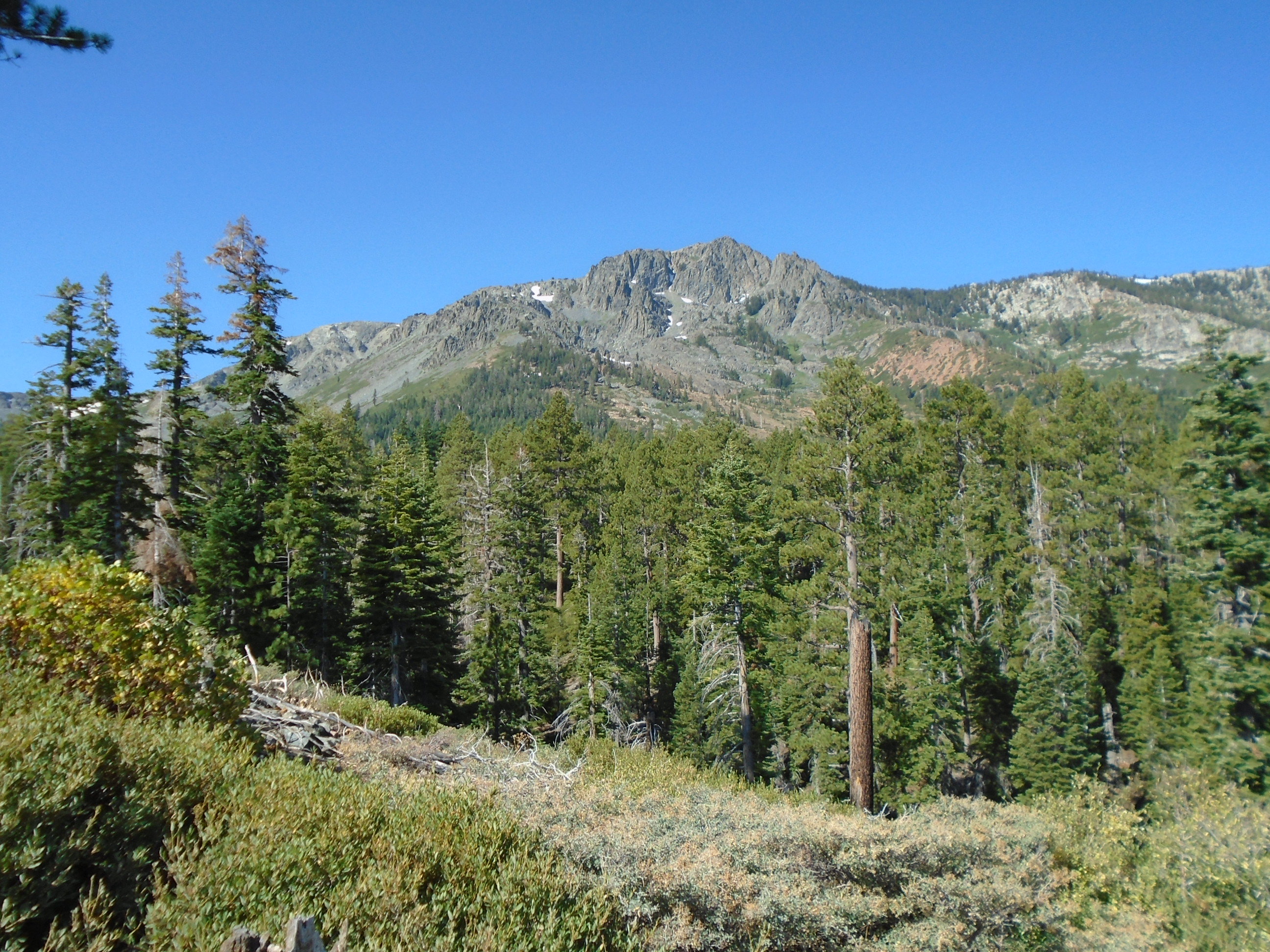
Forest in Mount Tallac Trail, Desolation Wilderness, Eldorado National Forest, California.
