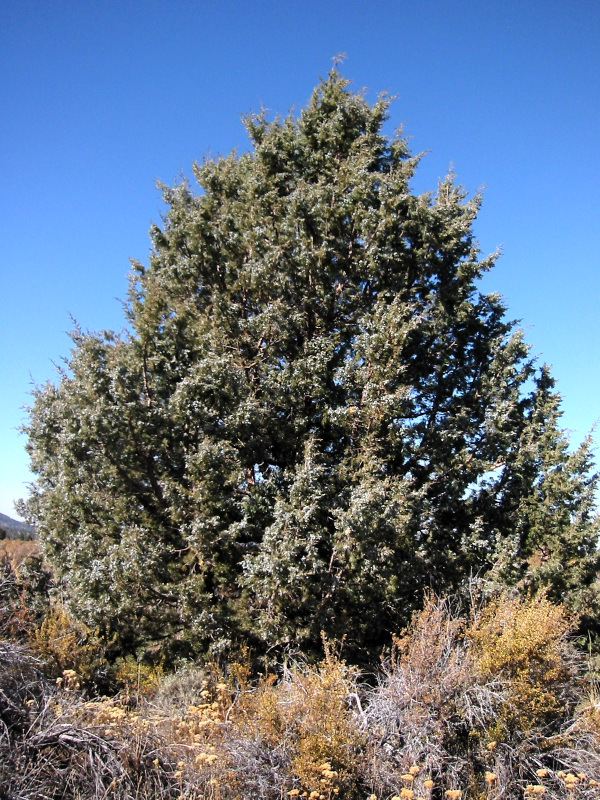
- At Lava Beds National Monument

Conservation status
- Least Concern (IUCN 3.1)

Scientific classification
- Kingdom: Plantae
- Clade: Tracheophytes
- Clade: Gymnosperms
- Division: Pinophyta
- Class: Pinopsida
- Order: Cupressales
- Family: Cupressaceae
- Genus: Juniperus
- Species: J. occidentalis

Binomial name
- Juniperus occidentalis Hook.
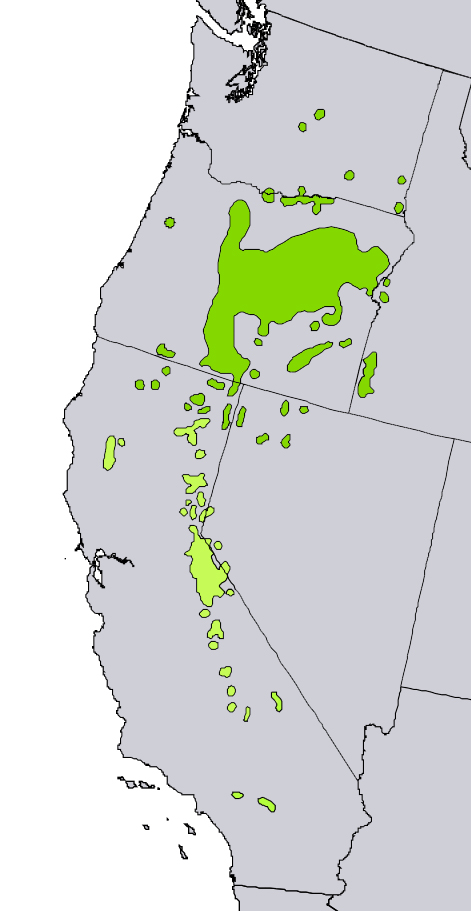
- Natural range in dark green (light green is J. grandis)

= Juniperus occidentalis =

Species of tree in North America

Juniperus occidentalis, known as the western juniper, is a shrub or tree native to the Western United States, growing in mountains at altitudes of 800–3,000 meters (2,600–9,800 ft) and rarely down to 100 m (330 ft). It is listed as Least Concern on the IUCN Red List because it is a widespread species with an increasing population.

== Description ==
Juniperus occidentalis is a shrub or small tree 4–15 meters (13–49 ft) tall. Exceptionally tall specimens can be found in the John Day area of Oregon in excess of 26–28 m (85–92 ft) tall.

The shoots are of moderate thickness among junipers, at 1–1.6 millimeters (1/32–1/16 in) diameter. The juvenile leaves (on young seedlings only) are needle-like and 5–10 mm (3/16–13/32 in) long. Arranged in opposite decussate pairs or whorls of three, the adult leaves are scale-like, 1–2 mm long (5 mm on lead shoots) and 1–1.5 mm broad. The cones are berry-like, 5–10 mm in diameter, blue-brown with a whitish waxy bloom, and mature in about 18 months. The male cones are 2–4 mm long and shed their pollen in early spring. The plants are about half monoecious (with both sexes on the same plant) and half dioecious (producing cones of only one sex).

The cones contain 1–3 seeds, the majority of which germinate in springtime. In Oregon, where most of the species resides, seeds germinate in April and the foliage emerges in June. Seed dispersal is conducted by water runoff, gravity, and animals.

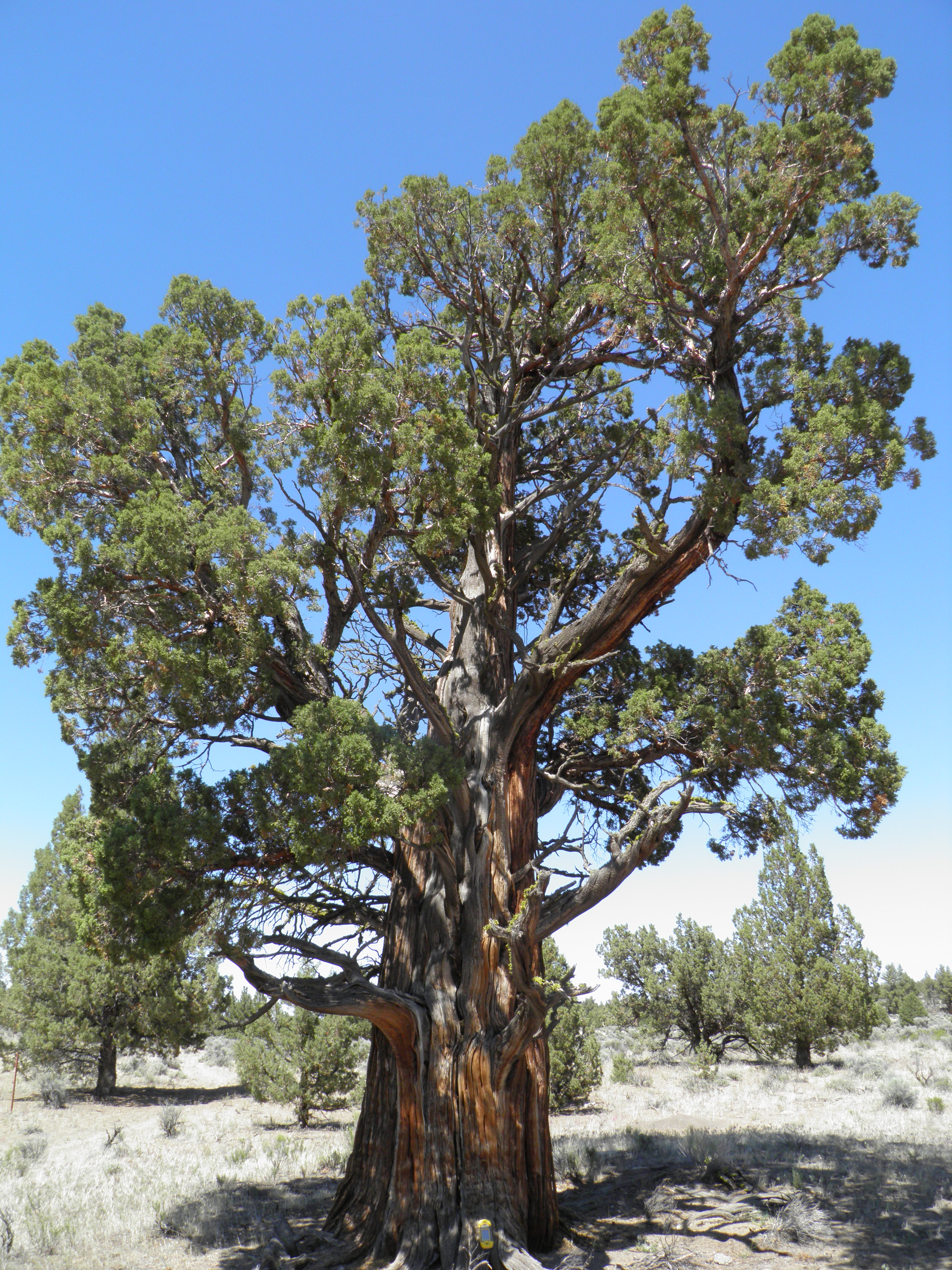
Form

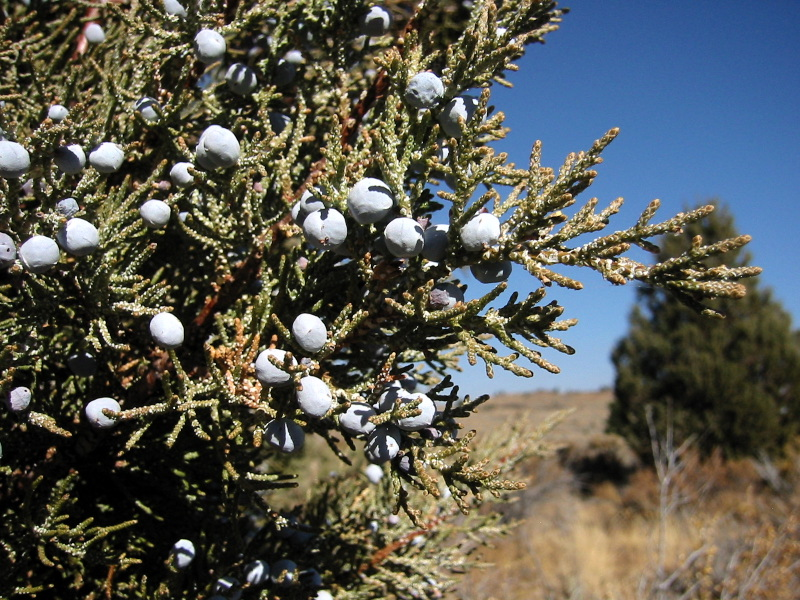
Berry-like female cones

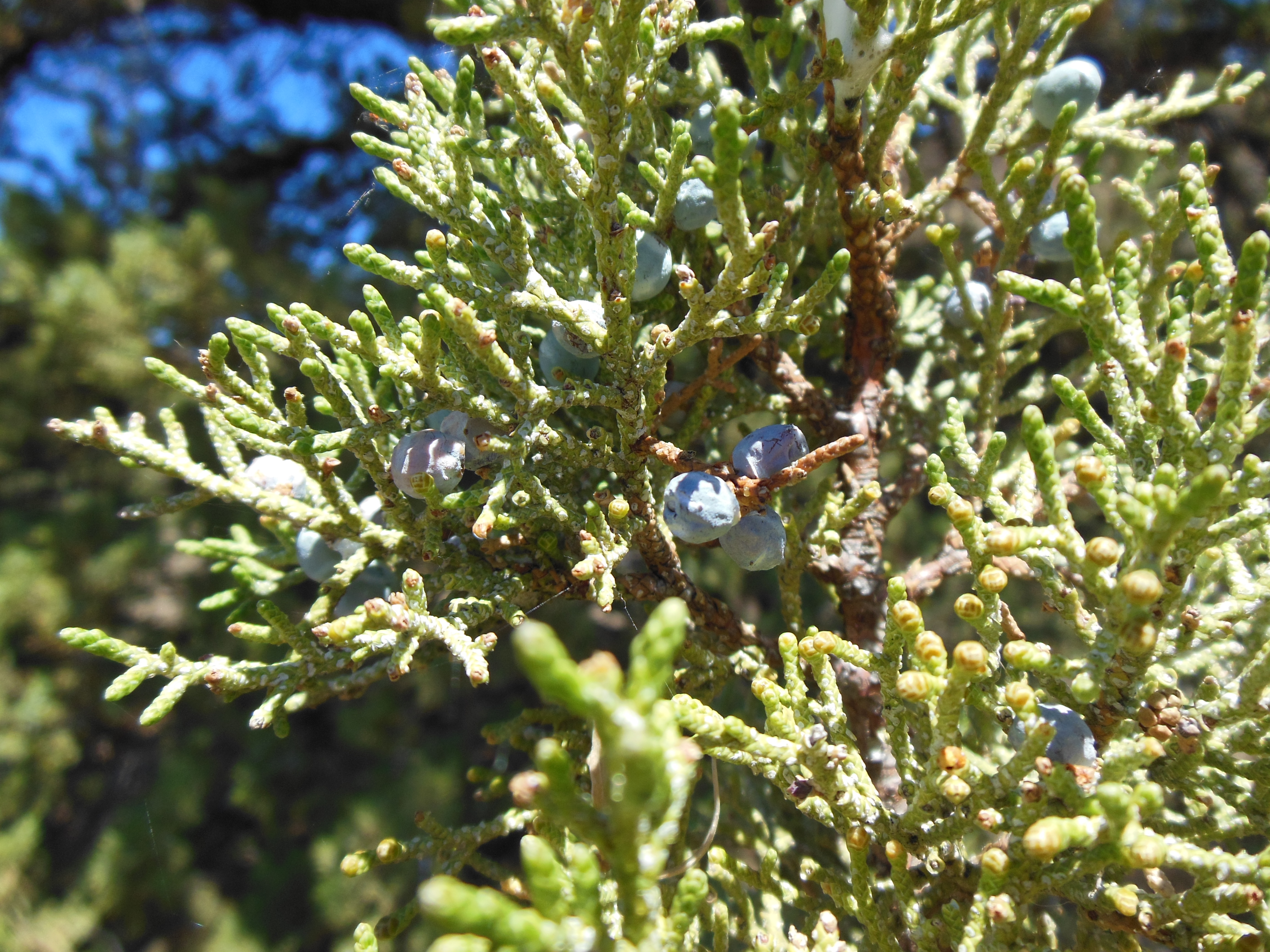
Leaves and cones

== Taxonomy ==
Further to the south, Juniperus grandis (the Sierra juniper) is sometimes treated as a variety of J. occidentalis (as J. occidentalis var. australis). J. grandis is 12–26 m (39–85 ft) tall with a trunk up to 3 m (10 ft) in diameter. The cones are 5–9 mm (3/16–11/32 in) wide. Most plants are dioecious, but about 5–10% are monoecious. The two plants are also chemically distinct. J. grandis can be found in California and westernmost Nevada, south of 40° 30' N latitude in the Sierra Nevada and San Bernardino Mountains. The oldest and largest specimen of J. grandis is 26 m (85 ft) tall and 3.88 m (12 ft 9 in) wide, perhaps 3,000 years old, and located in California's Stanislaus National Forest.

=== Names ===
Common names in English for this species include "western juniper", "sierra juniper", "western red cedar", and "yellow cedar". In the United States it is also occasionally called "pencil wood", likely for a common use. In the Klamath language this tree is called q'eeLo.

== Distribution and habitat ==
J. occidentalis can be found in the Western United States—specifically southeast Washington, eastern and central Oregon, southwest Idaho, northeastern California and extreme northwest Nevada, north of 40° 30' N latitude, east of the Cascade Range.

It usually occurs on dry, rocky sites where there is less competition from larger species like ponderosa pine and coast Douglas-fir. Annual precipitation can be as low as 20 centimetres (7 7/8 in). In very exposed positions at high altitude, it can assume a krummholz habit, growing low to the ground even when mature with a wide trunk. Hybrids with J. osteosperma are occasionally found.

In the John Day area of Oregon, it competes for sunlight among ponderosa pines at the bottom of some deep side canyons. However, it more commonly reaches 4–15 m (13–49 ft) with a bushier growth habit on open and barren ground.

== Ecology ==
The cones are an important food for several birds, including American robin, Clark's nutcracker, phainopepla and cedar waxwing; these digest the fleshy cone scales and disperse the seeds in their droppings.

The plants often bear galls caused by the juniper tip midge, Oligotrophus betheli. These are violet-purple fading to brown, 1–2 cm (3/8–13/16 in) in diameter, with dense modified spreading scale-leaves 6–10 mm (1/4–3/8 in) long and 2–3 mm broad at the base.

=== Fire ecology ===
In the past two decades, sagebrush steppe ecosystems have witnessed an expansion of juniper throughout the western U.S. This alteration of vegetation change can be associated with the decreased fire frequency, overgrazing of livestock, and an alteration of climate that transformed into a more wet and mild climate.

Fire scar data was collected and dated to display the expansion of western juniper. It started between 1875 and 1885, with a pinnacle rate of development between approximately 1905 and 1924.

Since the 1990s use of prescribed fires to control expansion of the species has increased. The results of increased prescription fires show a positive effect on plant communities.

== Uses ==
Like other junipers, J. occidentalis produces a crop of cones called a juniper berry. While original European gins used berries from J. communis, several distilleries—particularly in Bend, Oregon—have used local western juniper to flavor their gin.

While not common as a lumber source, Oregon State University has sponsored research into the use of western juniper for commercial applications such as sign posts and guard rails. Western juniper lumber is noted for its durability and high compression strength.
