= Fire Station No. 6 (Atlanta) =

- U.S. Historic district – Contributing property
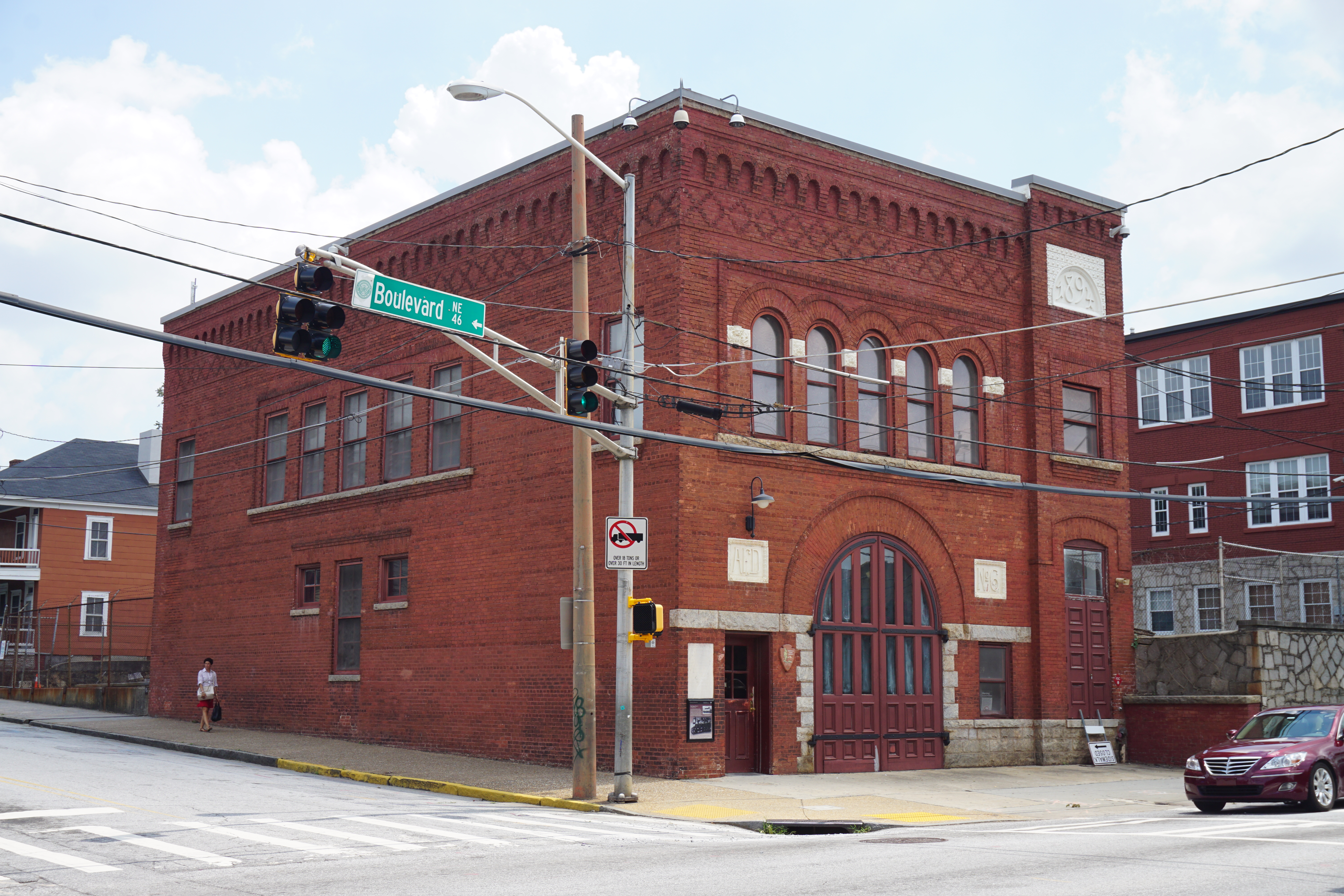
- Fire Station No. 6 (2016)

- Location within Atlanta Location within Georgia Location within the United States
- Location: 39 Boulevard; Atlanta, Georgia, United States
- Coordinates: 33°45′19″N 84°22′19″W
- Built: 1894
- Architect: Bruce & Morgan
- Architectural style: Romanesque Revival
- Part of: Martin Luther King Jr. National Historical Park (ID74000677)
- Added to NRHP: May 2, 1974

Fire Station No. 6 is a historic fire station in Atlanta, Georgia, United States. Built in 1894 with designs by Bruce & Morgan, the building is the oldest freestanding fire station in the city. Located in the Sweet Auburn neighborhood, the building is a contributing property in the Martin Luther King Jr. National Historical Park.

== History ==
The fire station was designed by the architectural firm Bruce & Morgan and built in 1894. The building, a two-story brick structure, was built in the Romanesque Revival style. Located at the intersection of Boulevard and Auburn Avenue in the Sweet Auburn neighborhood, the station was the first one in Atlanta to hire African American firefighters. The station would continue to serve the neighborhood for several decades, and by 1986, it was the oldest operating fire station in the city. In 1991, the station closed, and in 1995, it was renovated and converted to a museum on the history of desegregation in the Atlanta Fire Department. Among the items in the museum's collection are two of the station's original brass firepoles and a 1927 American LaFrance fire engine. Today, the building is the oldest freestanding fire station in the city. The building is a contributing property of the Martin Luther King Jr. National Historical Park and is located next to Our Lady of Lourdes Catholic Church.
