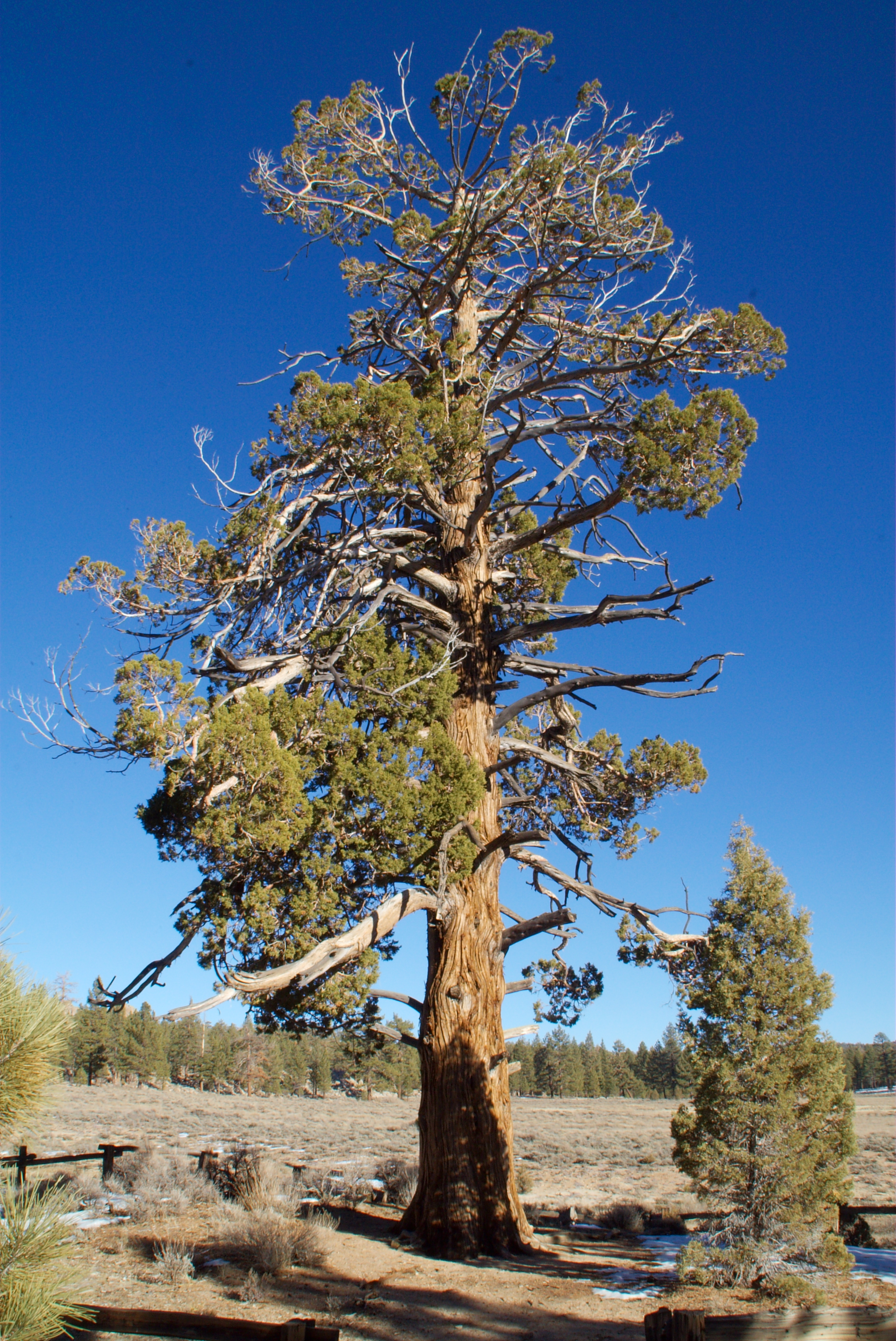

Scientific classification
- Kingdom: Plantae
- Clade: Tracheophytes
- Clade: Gymnosperms
- Division: Pinophyta
- Class: Pinopsida
- Order: Cupressales
- Family: Cupressaceae
- Genus: Juniperus
- Species: J. grandis

Binomial name
- Juniperus grandis R.P.Adams
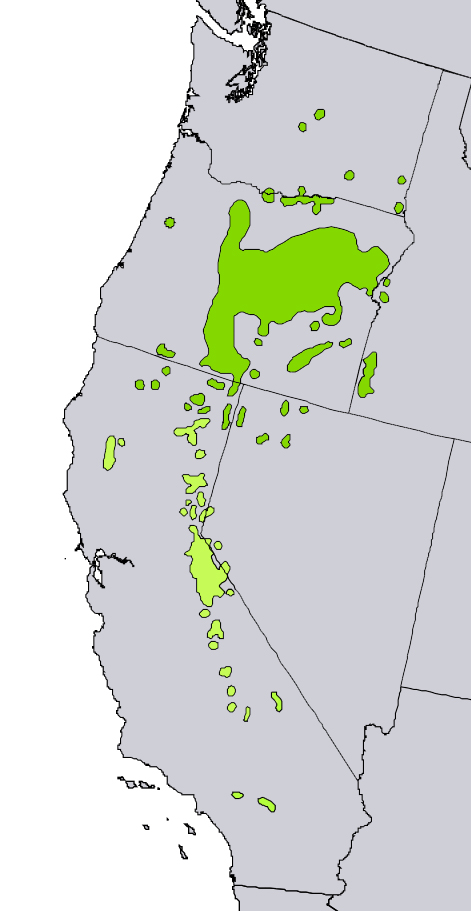
- Natural range in light green (dark green is Juniperus occidentalis)

Synonyms
- Juniperus occidentalis var. australis (Vasek) A.H. Holmgren & N.H. Holmgren

= Juniperus grandis =

Species of conifer

Juniperus grandis, known as Sierra juniper, Sierra western juniper, and western juniper, is a tree or tall shrub that is endemic to the Western United States. It is sometimes considered a variety or subspecies of Juniperus occidentalis, which is also known as western juniper.

== Description ==
Juniperus grandis is a medium-sized tree, growing to 12–26 metres (39–85 feet) tall. It has a stout trunk with red-brown bark, growing up to 3 m (10 ft) in diameter.

The whorled leaves are scale-like and closely appressed. Most plants are dioecious, but about 5–10% are monoecious.

Its fleshy and berry-like cones are 5–9 millimetres (3/16–3/8 inch) in diameter. Its pollination period is May and June. The seeds are wingless.

Based on dendrochronological evidence from the 2,675-year-old Scofield Juniper, Sierra junipers are the fourth longest-lived tree species after the Great Basin bristlecone pine, alerce and giant sequoia.

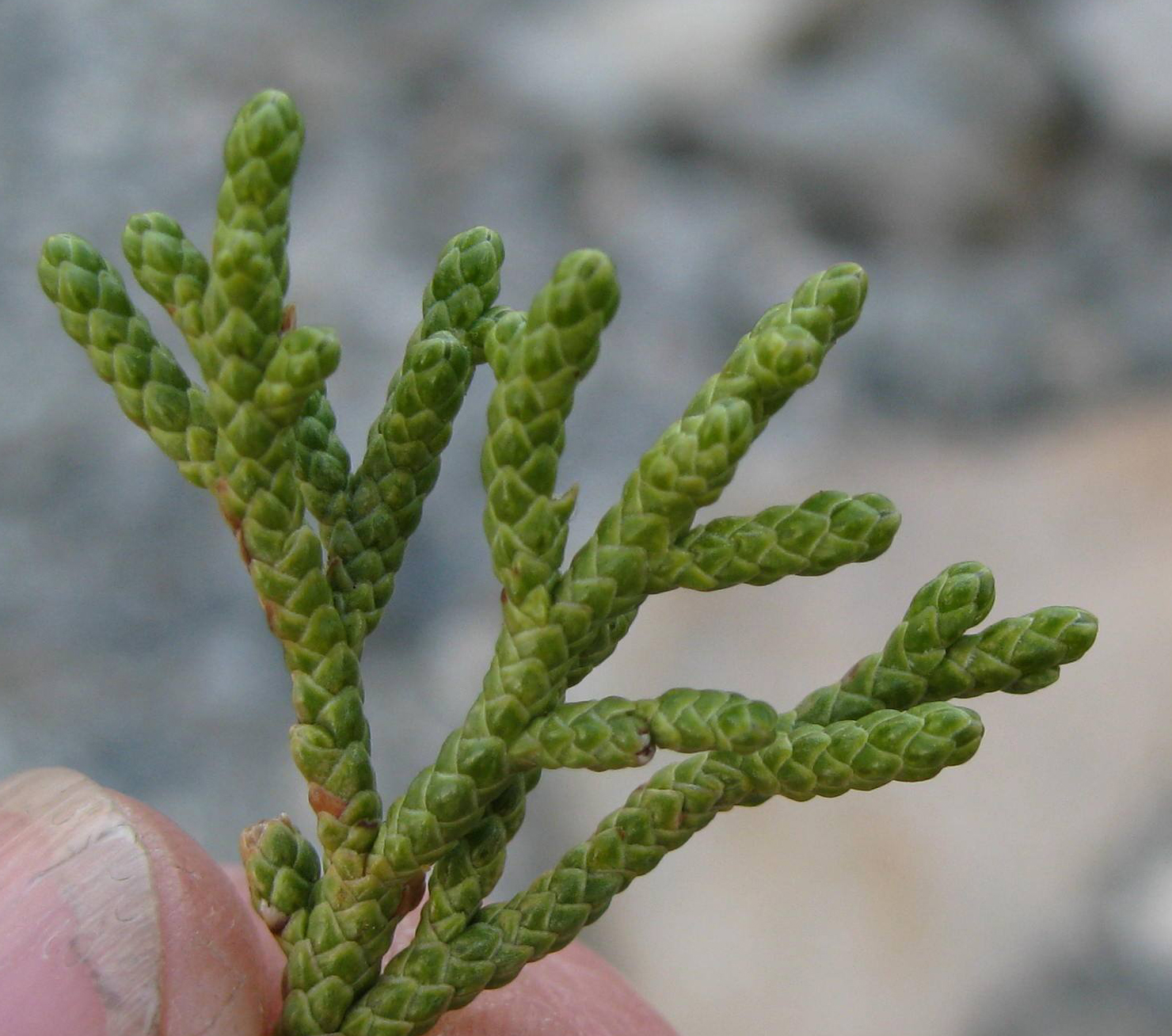
Leaves

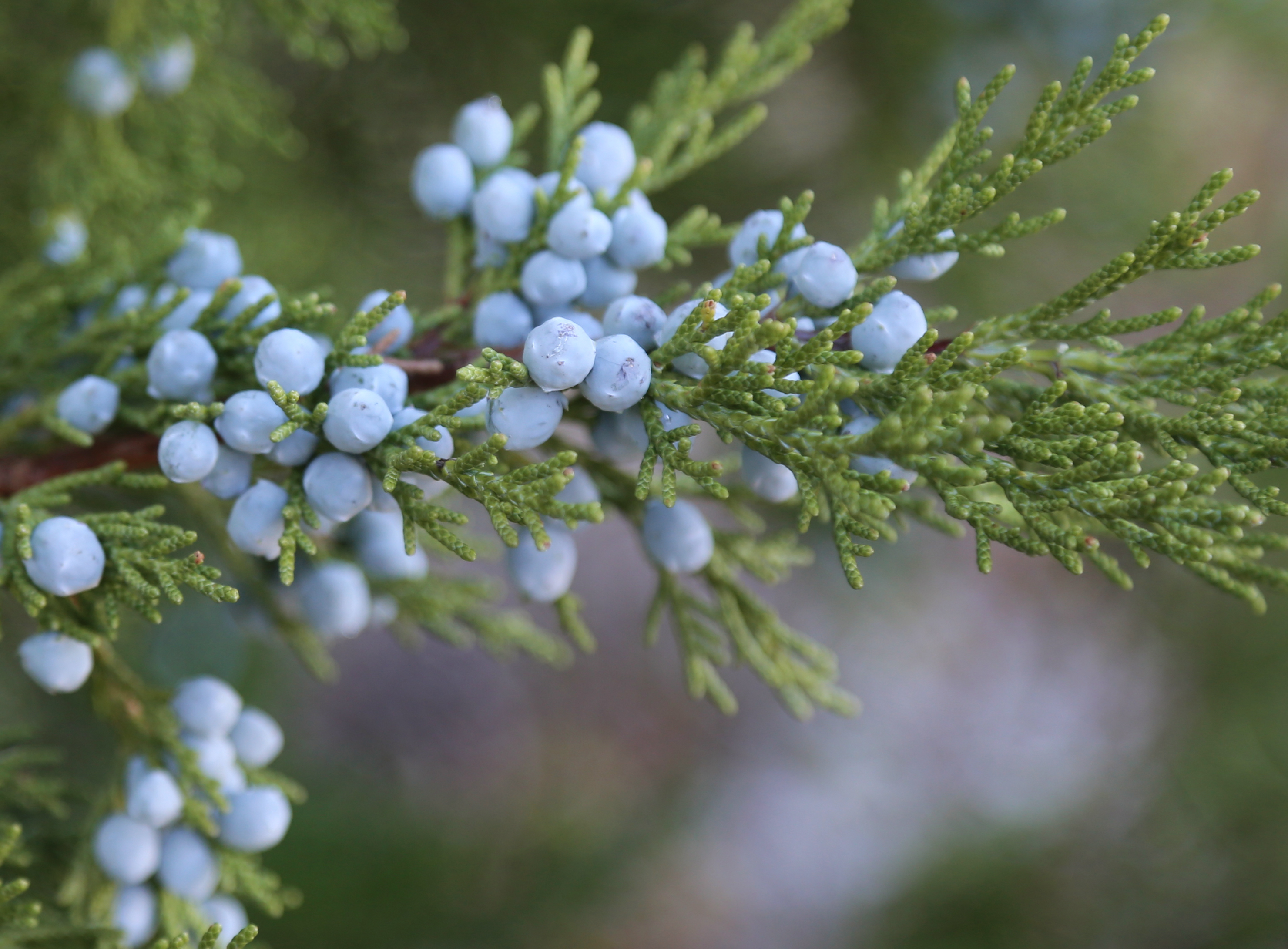
Berry-like cones

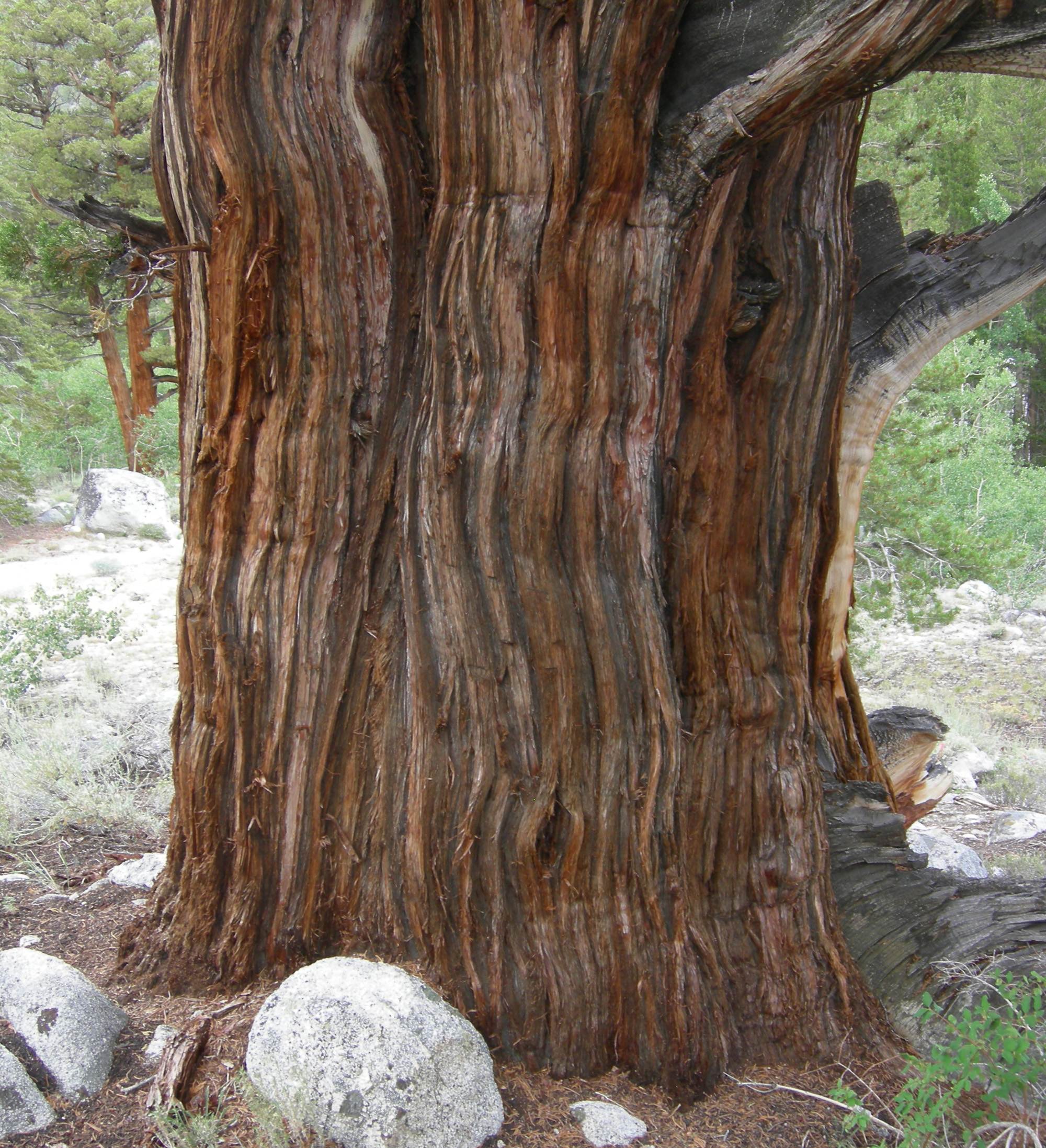
Bark

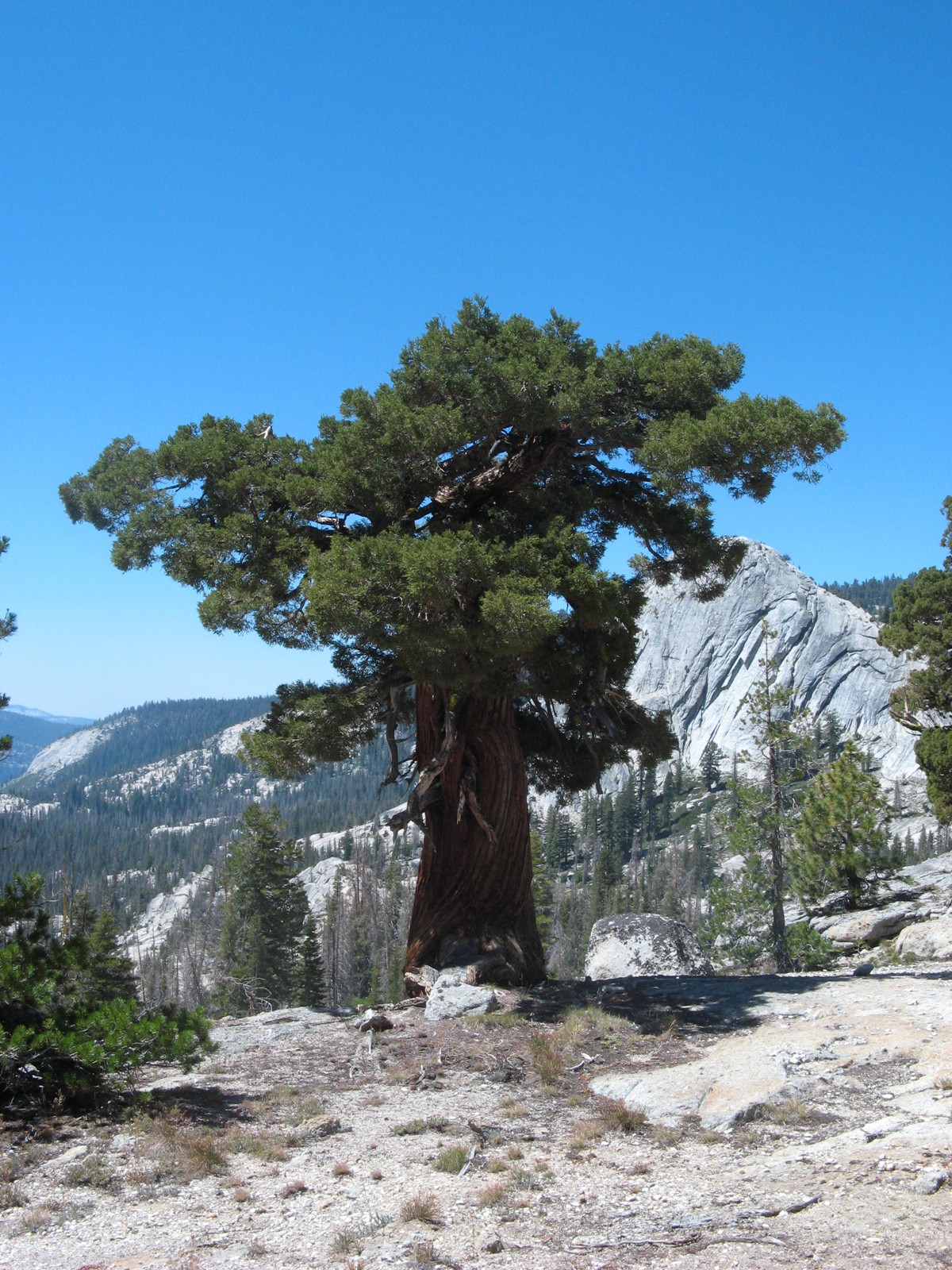
Mature form

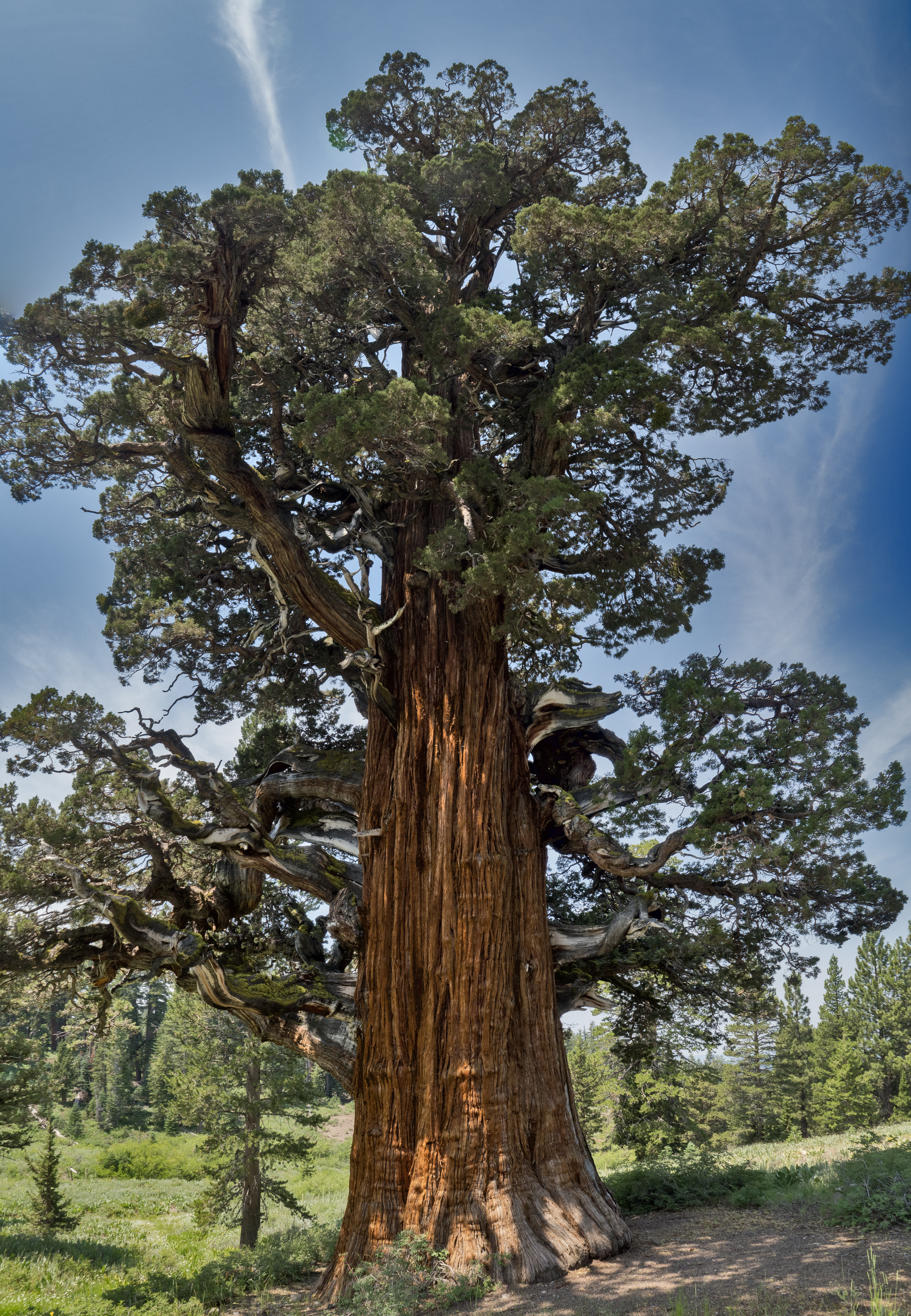
Bennett Juniper, the largest juniper

Mature tree in Lake Tahoe Basin Management Unit

== Distribution and habitat ==
Juniperus grandis is native to the Sierra Nevada in eastern California and western Nevada; and the White and Inyo Mountains, San Gabriel and San Bernardino Mountains, and higher elevations of Mojave Desert mountains, in Southern California.

It is found in exposed, dry, rocky slopes, flats, pinyon–juniper woodland, and temperate coniferous forest habitats, including the Sierra Nevada upper montane forest and Sierra Nevada subalpine zone ecoregions. It grows at elevations of 100–3,100 m (330–10,170 ft).
