= Martin Luther King Jr. National Historical Park =

National Historical Park of the United States

- Martin Luther King Jr. National Historical Park and Preservation District
- U.S. National Register of Historic Places
- U.S. National Historic Landmark District
- U.S. National Historic Site
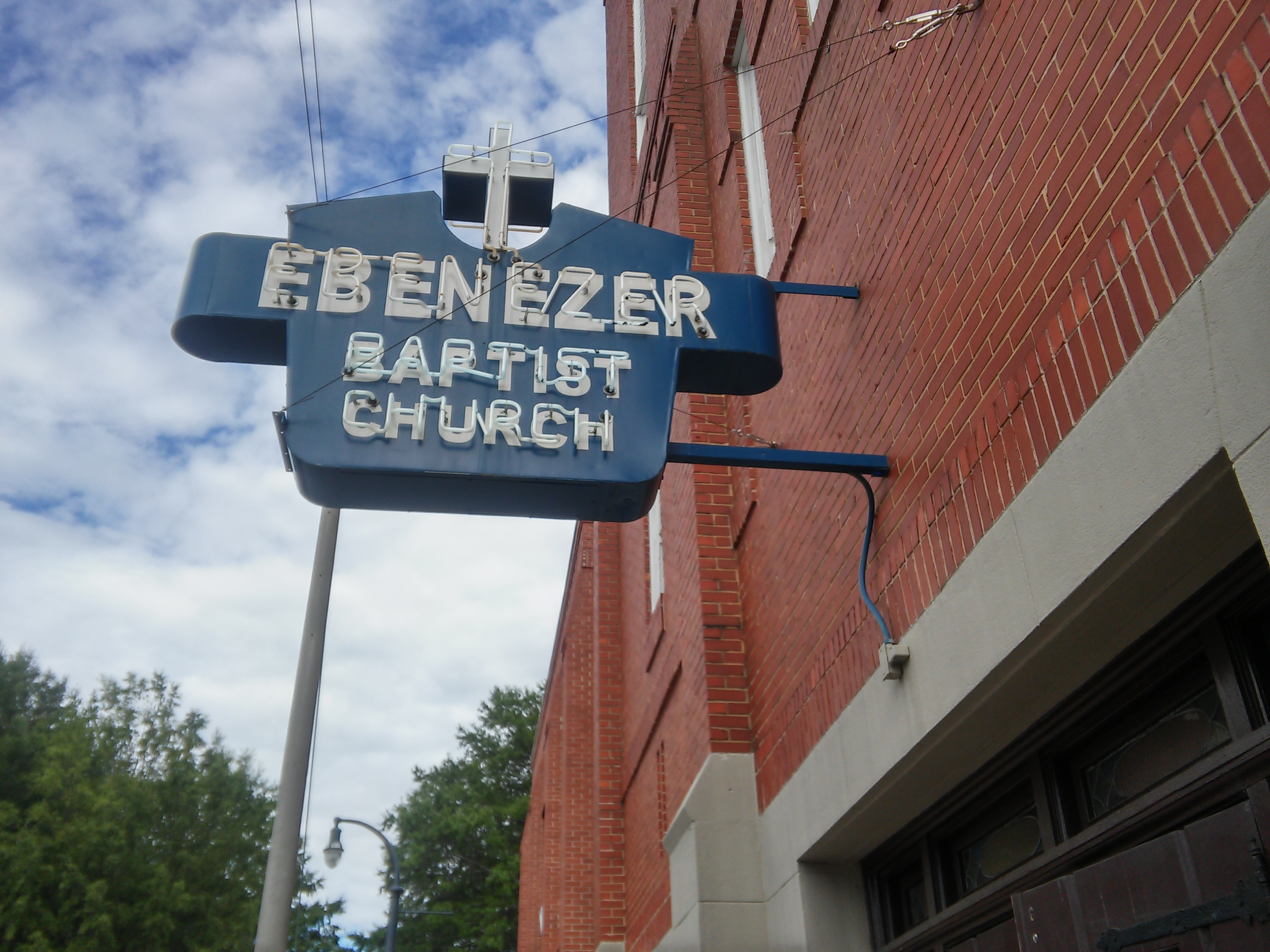
- The exterior sign of Ebenezer Baptist Church facing Auburn Avenue

- Location within Atlanta Location within Georgia Location within the United States
- Location: Roughly bounded by Courtland, Randolph, Chamberlain Sts. and Irwin Ave. (original) and Roughly bounded by Freedom Pkwy., John Wesley Dobbs Ave., Decatur St., Southern RR tracks, and I-75/85 (increase), Atlanta, Georgia
- Coordinates: 33°45′18″N 84°22′20″W
- Area: 34.47 acres (13.95 ha); 13.04 acres (5.28 ha) federal
- Built: 1929
- Architect: Multiple
- Architectural style: Late 19th and early 20th century American movements, Modern movement
- Visitation: 647,349 (2025)
- Website: Martin Luther King Jr. National Historical Park
- NRHP reference No.: 74000677, 80000435, 00000741

Significant dates
- Added to NRHP: May 2, 1974 (original); June 12, 2001 (increase)
- Designated NHLD: May 5, 1977
- Designated NHS: October 10, 1980

The Martin Luther King Jr. National Historical Park covers about 35 acres (0.14 km^{2}) and includes several sites in Atlanta, Georgia related to the life and work of civil rights leader Martin Luther King Jr. Within the park are his boyhood home and Ebenezer Baptist Church – the church where King was baptized and both he and his father, Martin Luther King Sr., were pastors – as well as the outdoor memorial tombs of King and his wife, civil rights activist Coretta Scott King.

The park is administered by the National Park Service and has a visitor center and museum.

== History ==
These places, critical to the interpretation of the life of Martin Luther King Jr. and his legacy as a leader of the American civil rights movement, were originally included in the National Historic Site or National Historic Landmark listings first established on October 10, 1980. The site was expanded and designated as a national historical park through a bipartisan bill long championed by John Lewis and signed on January 8, 2018, by President Donald Trump.

In total, the buildings included in the site make up 35 acres (0.14 km^{2}). The visitor center contains a museum that chronicles the American Civil Rights Movement and the path of Martin Luther King Jr. The King Center for Nonviolent Social Change includes the burial place of King, and his wife, activist Coretta Scott King. An 1894 firehouse (Fire Station No. 6) served the Sweet Auburn community until 1991, and now contains a gift shop and an exhibit on desegregation in the Atlanta Fire Department. The "I Have a Dream" International World Peace Rose Garden, and a memorial tribute to Mohandas K. Gandhi are part of the site, as is the "International Civil Rights Walk of Fame" which commemorates some of the courageous pioneers who worked for social justice.

In 2019, the National Park Foundation purchased the Life Home of Dr. Martin Luther King Jr. on Sunset Avenue, where the family moved in 1965, from the estate of Coretta Scott King and transferred it to the National Park Service for restoration before it is opened to the public as an expansion of the National Historic Park.

Annual events celebrating Martin Luther King Jr. Day in January typically draw large crowds. Speakers have included presidents of the United States, national and local politicians, and civil rights leaders. Remembrances are also held during Black History Month (February), and on the anniversary of King's April 4, 1968, assassination in Memphis, Tennessee.

== Preservation ==
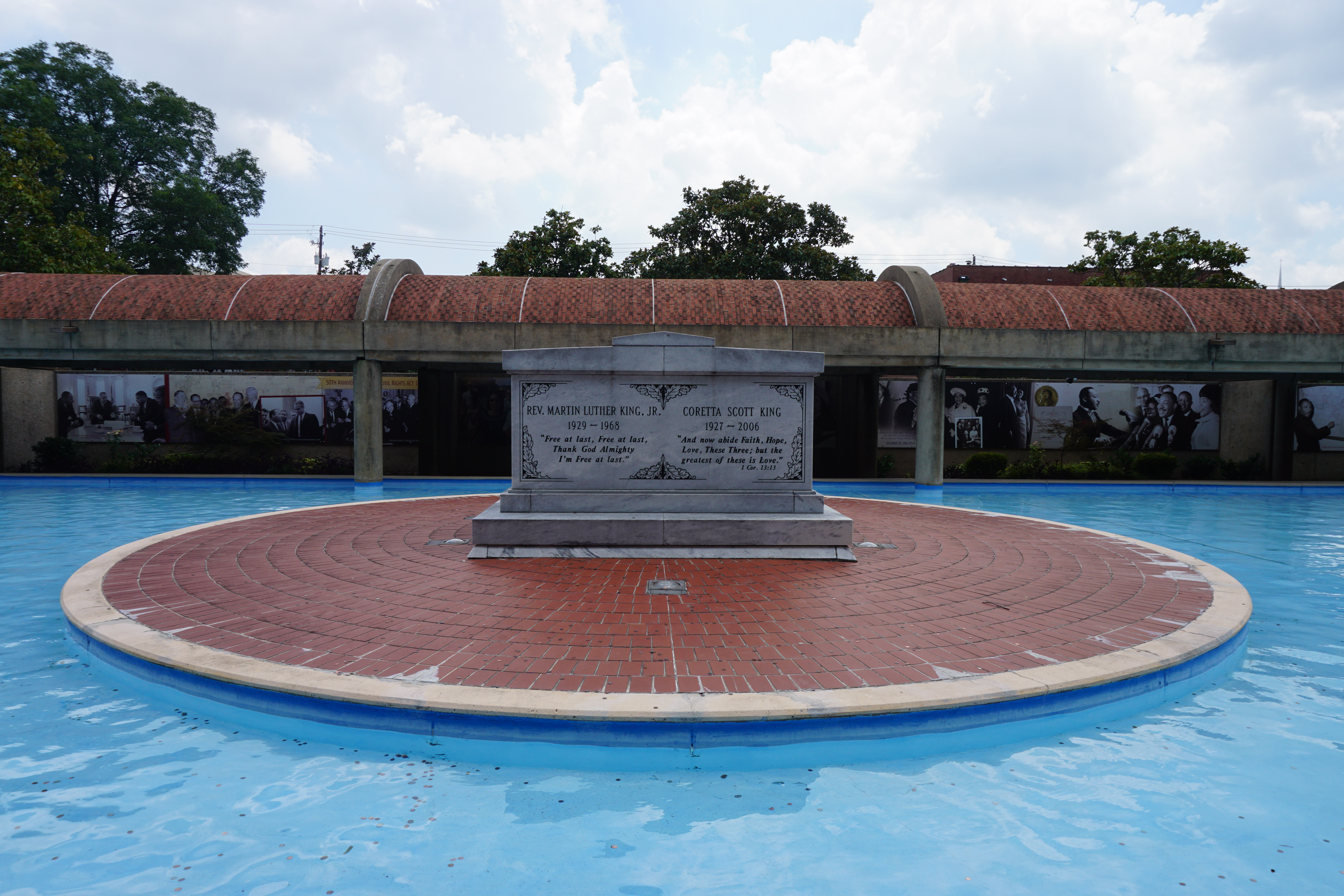
Doctor King and Mrs. King's outdoor granite mausoleum crypts

The Martin Luther King Jr. Historic District, an area bounded roughly by Irwin, Randolph, Edgewood, Jackson, and Auburn avenues, was listed on the U.S. National Register of Historic Places on May 2, 1974. The district included Ebenezer Baptist Church, King's granite memorial tomb, King's birthplace, shotgun row houses, Victorian houses, the Atlanta Baptist Preparatory Institute site, Our Lady of Lourdes Catholic Church, Fire Station No. 6, and the Triangle Building at the intersection of Old Wheat Street and Auburn Avenue.

Much of the area was designated as a National Historic Landmark district on May 5, 1977. The Trust for Public Land purchased 5 single-family homes along Auburn Avenue in the late 1970s, the same block Martin Luther King Jr. grew up on. The Trust for Public Land purchased more than a dozen properties over the next 20 years to create a parking lot as well as a pedestrian greenway to link the King district to the Jimmy Carter Presidential Center. In 2008, The Trust for Public Land acquired one of the remaining historic properties in the neighborhood, on the corner of Auburn Avenue.

By U.S. Congressional legislation, the site with associated buildings and gardens was authorized as a national historic site on October 10, 1980; it is administered by the National Park Service (NPS). A 22.4-acre (9.1 ha) area including 35 contributing properties was covered, including 22 previously included in the NRHP historic district. The area covered in the NRHP designation was enlarged on June 12, 2001. In 2018, it was redesignated as a national historical park, adding Prince Hall Masonic Temple to the protected area.

== Martin Luther King Jr.'s Birth Home ==
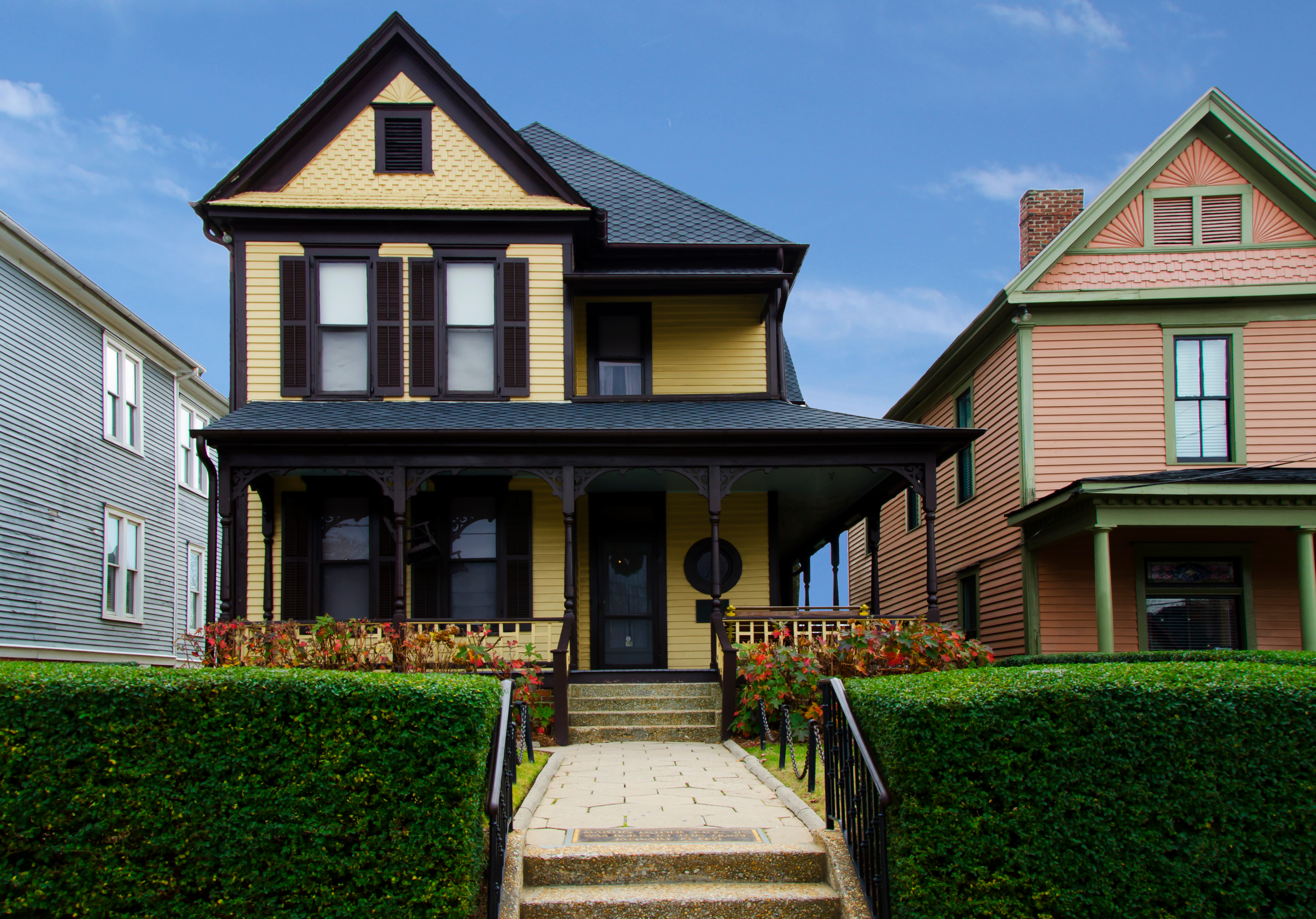
King's boyhood home

The King Birth Home is located at 501 Auburn Avenue in the Sweet Auburn Historic District. Built in 1895, it sits about a block east of Ebenezer Baptist Church. King's maternal grandparents, the Rev. Adam Daniel (A. D.) Williams, who was pastor of the Ebenezer Baptist Church, and his wife, Jennie Williams, bought the house for $3,500 in 1909. In 1926, when King's father married Alberta Williams, the couple moved into the house, where King Jr. was born in 1929.

The King family lived in the house until 1941. It was then converted into a two-family dwelling. The Rev. A. D. Williams King, King Jr's brother, lived on the second floor in the 1950s and early 1960s.

The first level includes the front porch, parlor, study, dining room, kitchen, laundry, bedroom and a bathroom. The second level includes four bedrooms and a bathroom. The visitor center offers free tours of the house led by National Park Service rangers, but with limited availability.

== The King Center ==
In 1968, after King's death, Coretta Scott King founded the Martin Luther King Jr. Center for Nonviolent Social Change (a.k.a. the King Center). Since 1981, the center has been housed in a building that is part of the King complex located on Auburn Avenue adjacent to Ebenezer Baptist Church.

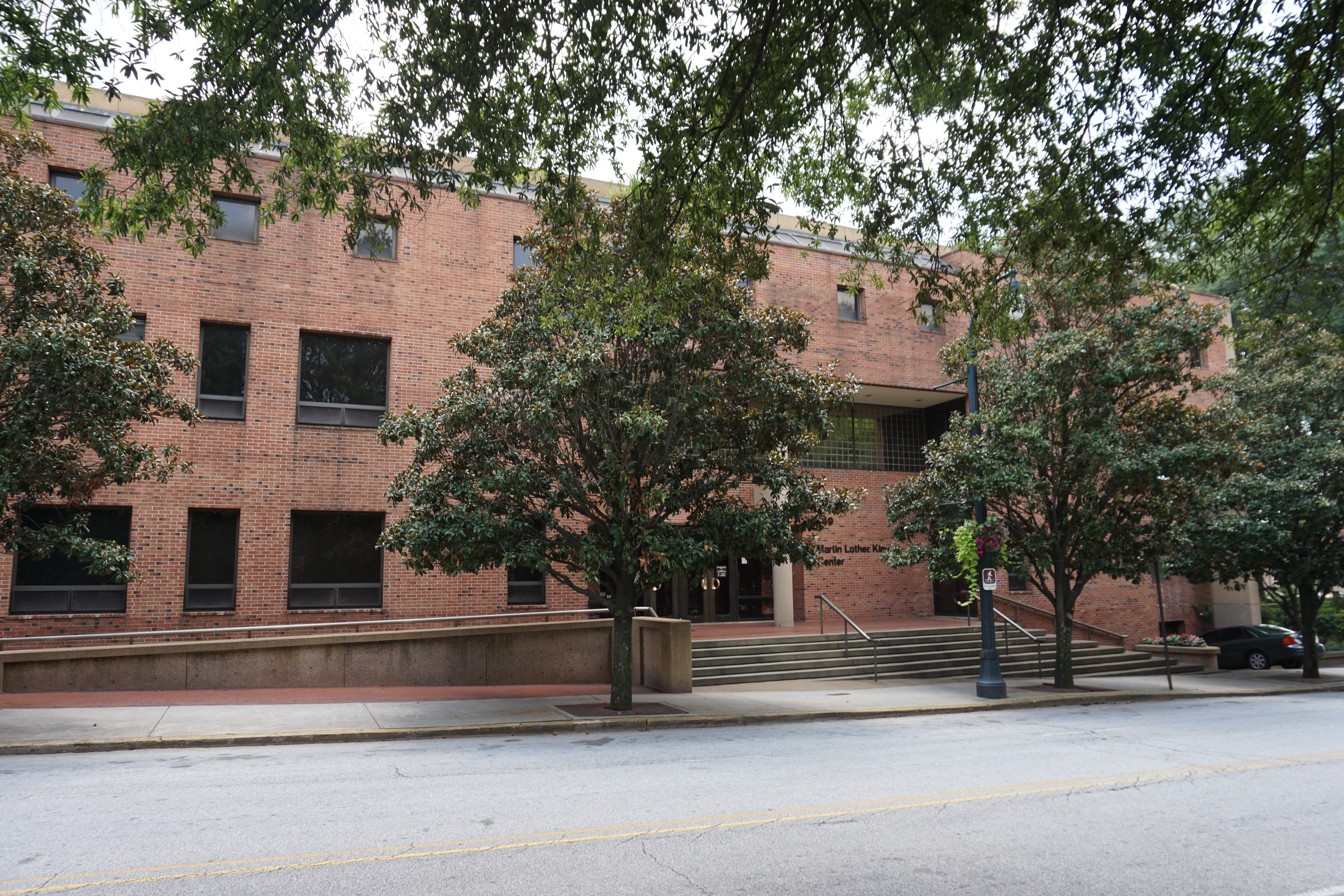
The King Center in 2016, close to the Ebenezer Baptist Church, at the Martin Luther King Jr. National Historic Site.

In 1977, a memorial tomb was dedicated to King. His remains were moved to the tomb, on a plaza between the center and the church. King's gravesite and a reflecting pool are located next to Freedom Hall. After her death, Mrs. King was interred with her husband on February 7, 2006. An eternal flame is located nearby.

Freedom Hall at 449 Auburn Avenue features exhibits about Dr. and Mrs. King, Mahatma Gandhi and American activist Rosa Parks. It hosts special events and programs associated with civil rights and social justice. It contains a Grand Foyer, large theater/conference auditorium, bookstore and resource center, and various works of art from across the globe. The Grand Foyer features art from Africa and Georgia. The paneling lining the staircase is from the sapeli tree, which grows in Nigeria.

In 1990, Behold, a statue honoring Martin Luther King Jr., was dedicated near Ebenezer Baptist Church.

As of 2006, the King Center is a privately owned inholding within the authorized boundaries of the park. The King family has debated among themselves as to whether they should sell it to the National Park Service to ensure preservation.

== Visitor center ==
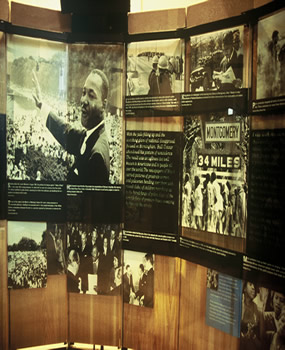
Courage to Lead exhibit at the visitor center

The visitor center at 450 Auburn Avenue was built in 1996 and features the multimedia exhibit Courage To Lead, which follows the parallel paths of King and the civil rights movement. Visitors can also walk down a stylized "Freedom Road". The Children of Courage exhibit, geared towards children, tells the story of the children of the civil rights movement with a challenge to our youth today. Video programs are presented on a continuing basis and there is a staffed information desk.

== Gandhi statue ==
The statue of Mohandas Gandhi was dedicated in 1998. It is one of the few statues at the site and helps give the global context and political inspiration for King and other civil rights leaders in the U.S. The statue stands 6'4". Ideas for honoring Gandhi in Atlanta started as early as 1992, before settling on a life-size statue that was donated by the government of India with collaboration with various local, state and national governments and organizations.

== International Civil Rights Walk of Fame ==
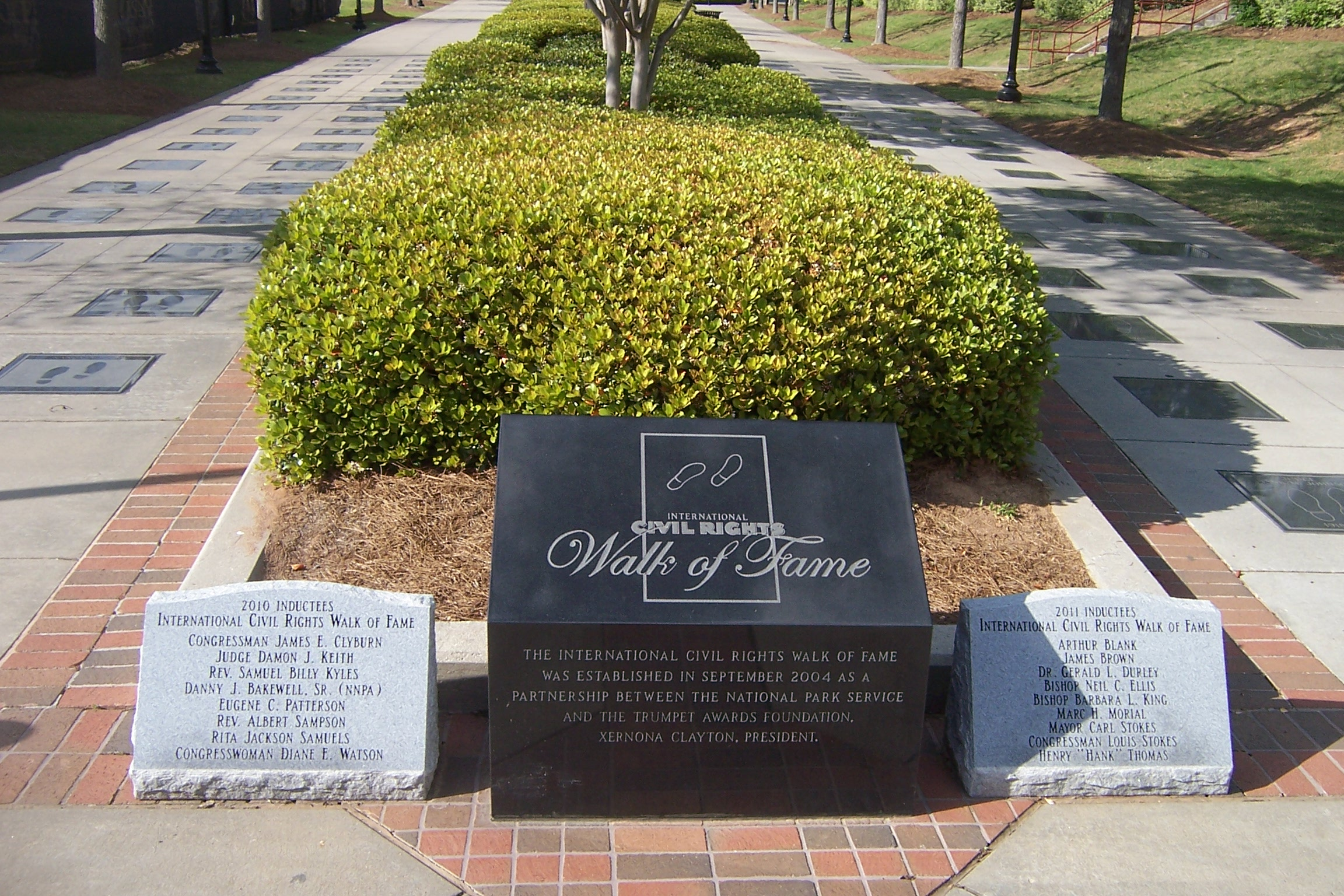
Walk of Fame

The International Civil Rights Walk of Fame was created in 2004 and honors some of the participants in the Civil Rights Movement. The walk along the Promenade, includes footsteps, marked in granite and bronze. According to the National Park Service, the Walk of Fame was created to "pay homage to the "brave warriors" of justice who sacrificed and struggled to make equality a reality for all." The new addition to the area is expected to enhance the historic value of the area, enrich cultural heritage, and augment tourist attractions.

The Walk of Fame was started by Xernona Clayton and run in partnership with a foundation she started the same year, The Trumpet Awards Foundation.

== Prince Hall ==
Located at 332 Auburn Avenue, the Prince Hall Masonic Temple is where the Southern Christian Leadership Conference (SCLC) established its initial headquarters in 1957. This historic and distinguished civil rights organization was co-founded by King, who also served as its first president. Owned by the Most Worshipful Prince Hall Grand Lodge of Georgia, the building was included within the authorized boundary of the park in 2018.

== Photo gallery ==
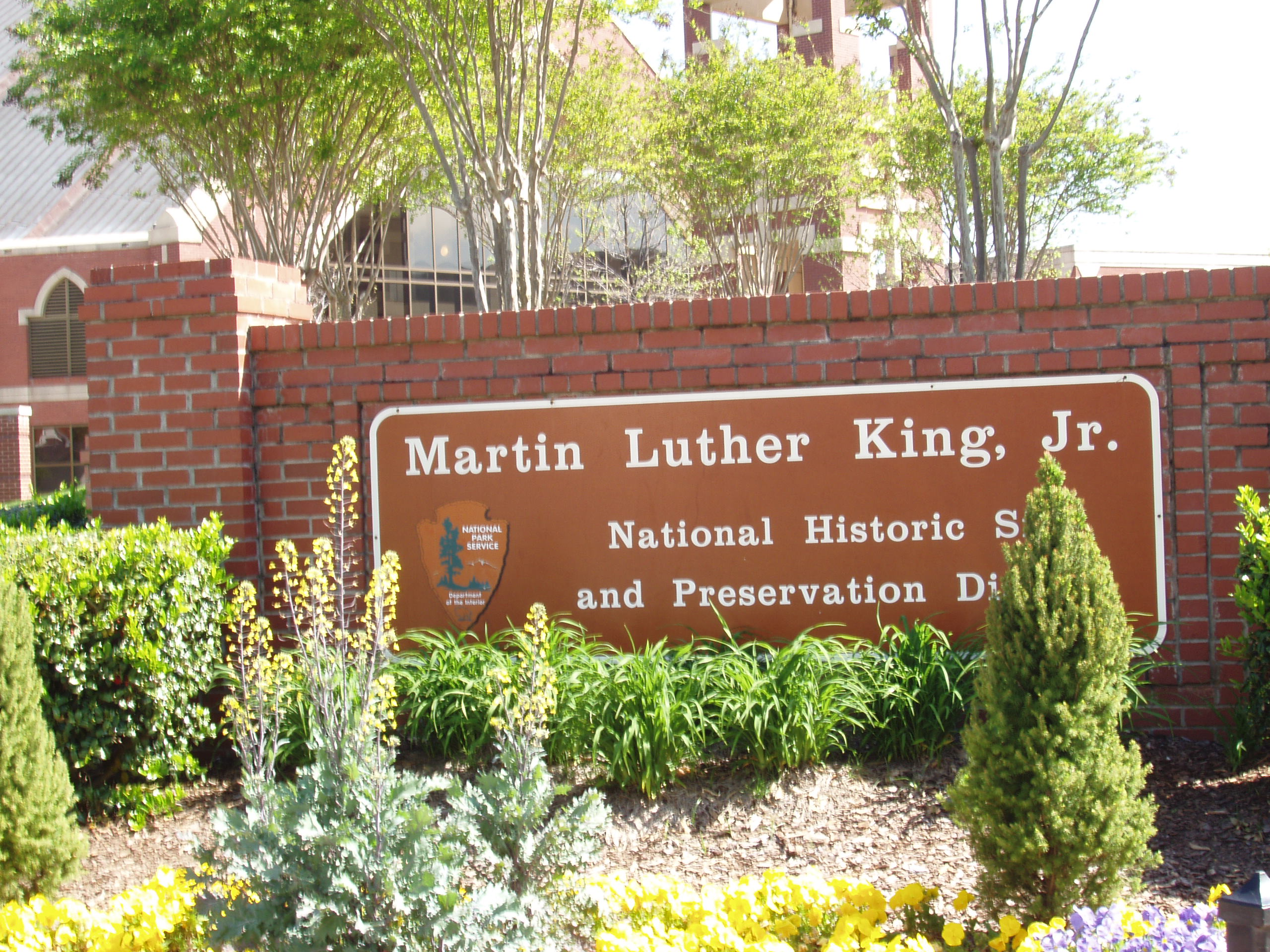
The Martin Luther King Jr. National Historical Park honors the life of King

Shotgun houses on Auburn Ave. directly across from King's boyhood home

Late 19th/Early 20th century homes on Auburn Ave. in the Martin Luther King Jr. Historic District

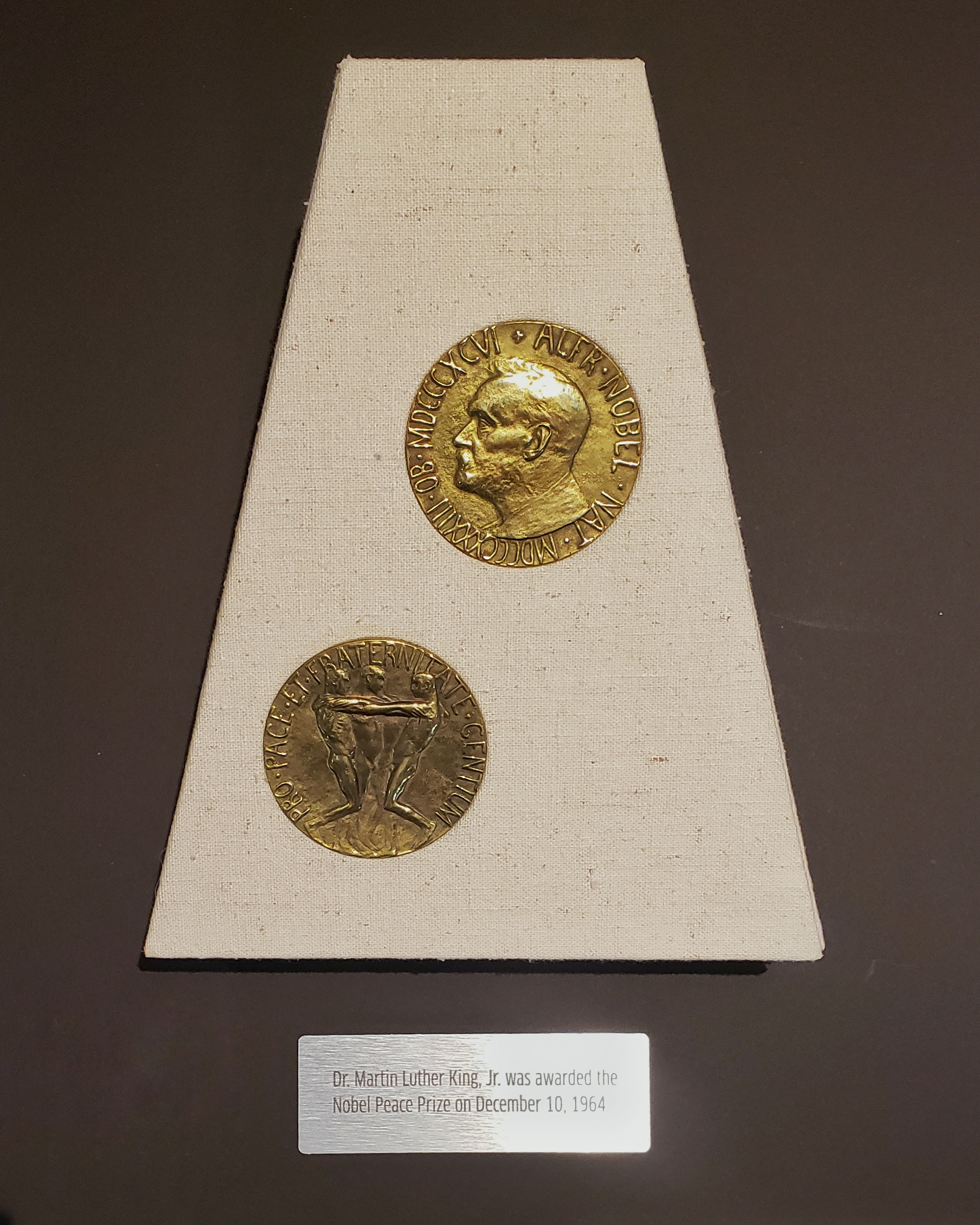
Nobel Peace Prize awarded to King in 1964

== Reception ==
As of 2026, U.S. News & World Report rated the park the #2 best thing to see in Atlanta.

== See also ==
- List of memorials to Martin Luther King Jr.
- List of National Historic Landmarks in Georgia
- National Register of Historic Places listings in Fulton County, Georgia
- List of areas in the United States National Park System § National historical parks
- Auburn Avenue Research Library on African American Culture and History
