= Atlanta Fire Rescue Department =

Fire rescue department of Atlanta, Georgia, U.S.

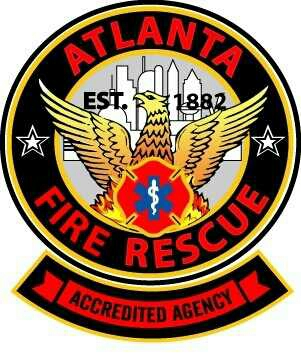

Operational area
- Country: United States
- State: Georgia
- City: Atlanta

Agency overview
- Annual calls: 87,320 (2014)
- Employees: 1,125 (2015)
- Annual budget: $144,419,459 (2024)
- Staffing: Career
- Fire chief: Roderick M. Smith
- Mayor of Atlanta responsible: Andre Dickens
- EMS level: ALS and BLS
- IAFF: 134

Facilities and equipment
- Battalions: 7
- Stations: 35
- Engines: 35
- Trucks: 17
- Squads: 2
- USAR: 2
- Airport crash: 10
- Rescue boats: 4

Website
- www.atlantafirerescue.com
- IAFF website

The Atlanta Fire Rescue Department is the fire department of the City of Atlanta and provides fire protection and first responder emergency medical services to the city of Atlanta, Georgia. The department is responsible for an area of 132.6 square miles (343 km^{2}) with over 519,000 residents. As of January 21, 2021, the Fire Chief is Roderick M. Smith.

== History ==
Officially started in March 25, 1951, as the Atlanta Fire Company No. 1, the Atlanta Fire Rescue Department dates its history back to February 1848, when the city council ordered residents to keep fire buckets in their houses.

== Stations and apparatus ==
The Atlanta Fire Rescue Department currently operates out of 34 fire stations, located throughout the city of Atlanta, organized into 7 Battalions, including an Airport Battalion commanding 5 Fire Stations that serve the Hartsfield-Jackson Airport. Below is a list of all of the fire station locations in the city.

Fire Station Number	Neighborhood	Engine Company	Truck Company	Special Unit	Chief Units	Battalion
1	Castleberry Hill	Engine 1*	Tiller Truck 1	Decon. Unit 1, Air Unit 7, Air Shuttle Unit	Division Chief Unit 1	3
2	Lakewood Heights	Engine 2*	Tiller Truck 2	Decon. Unit 2, Air Bag Unit 2		1
3	North Buckhead	Engine 3		Mobile Command Unit		6
5	Westside	Engine 5*			Battalion Chief Unit 4	4
4	Old Fourth Ward	Engine 6*		Squad 4		5
7	West End	Engine 7*		EMS-2*		4
8	Hills Park	Engine 8			Battalion Chief Unit 2	2
9	Adamsville	Engine 9*				4
10	Grant Park	Engine 10	Tiller Truck 10		Battalion Chief Unit 5	5
11	Atlantic Station	Engine 11	Tower 11	Mini-Pumper 11, Swift Water/Dive Rescue Unit		3
12	Edgewood	Engine 12	Tiller Truck 12			5
13	East Atlanta	Engine 13*		Mass Decon Unit		5
14	Oakland City	Engine 14	Tiller Truck 14			1
15	Midtown	Engine 15*	Tiller Truck 15	FAST 15	Battalion Chief Unit 3	3
16	Washington Park	Engine 16*	Tiller Truck 16			2
17	Westview	Engine 17*		GSAR 61 Collapse Rig		4
18	Kirkwood	Engine 18				5
19	Virginia-Highland	Engine 19				3
20	Capitol View Manor	Engine 20				1
21	Buckhead Forest	Engine 21*	Tiller Truck 21	Air Bag Unit 21, G.S.A.R. Unit 6	Battalion Chief Unit 6	6
22	Grove Park	Engine 22				2
23	Berkeley Park	Engine 23*		Mini-Pumper 23		3
24	Hartsfield–Jackson Airport	Engine 24 (ARFF)	Tiller Truck 47	ARFF 1, ARFF 2, Squad 24, Mini pump 51, med 4		7
25	Cascade Heights	Engine 25	Truck 25			4
26	Westminster	Engine 26*	Truck 26			6
27	Chastain Park	Engine 27		Hose Tender 27		6
28	Riverside	Engine 28		Foam 28,		2
29	Piedmont Heights	Engine 29	Truck 29			6
30	Glenrose Heights	Engine 30*			Battalion Chief Unit 1	1
31	Ben Hill	Engine 31	Truck 31			4
32	Hartsfield–Jackson Airport	Engine 32 (ARFF)		Med 1, ARFF 3, ARFF4, Mini Pump 44		7
33	Hartsfield–Jackson Airport			ARFF 5, ARFF 6, EMS 3*, Foam 1, Foam Tanker 7, Med 5, reserve ambu		7
34	Poole Creek	Engine 34		Mobile Ambulance Bus 1, antique light truck		1
35	Hartsfield–Jackson Airport	Engine 35 (ARFF)		Med. Unit 2, ARFF 7, ARFF 8, ARFF Reserve	Battalion Chief Unit 7	7
38	Brookview Heights	Engine 38*	Tiller Truck 38			2
40	Hartsfield–Jackson Airport	Engine 40 (ARFF)	Truck 41 (ARFF Quint)	Med 3, ARFF 9, ARFF 10, Mini Pump 50, Stair Unit 48, Hazmat 2		7

=== Former stations ===
- Fire Station No. 6, a contributing property of the NRHP-listed Martin Luther King Jr. National Historical Park
- Fire Station No. 11, NRHP-listed

== Notable incidents ==
=== Great Atlanta fire ===
The Great Atlanta fire of 1917 broke out in the Old Fourth Ward around 12:30 pm on May 21, 1917. At the time of the fire, the department had simple horse-drawn fire apparatus and the city's fire hydrants were running with low pressure. It is unclear just how the fire started, but it was fueled by hot temperatures and strong winds. After nearly 10 hours, 300 acres (120 ha) had burned, destroying 1,900 structures and displacing over 10,000 people. Damages were estimated at $5 million, ($126 million when adjusted for inflation).

=== Winecoff Hotel fire ===
The Winecoff Hotel fire, which occurred on December 7, 1946, was the deadliest hotel fire in United States history, killing 119 hotel occupants, including the hotel's owners. The Winecoff Hotel had been advertised as "absolutely fireproof." While the hotel's steel structure was indeed protected against the effects of fire, the hotel's interior finishes were combustible, and the building's exit arrangements consisted of a single stairway serving all fifteen floors. All of the hotel's occupants above the fire's origin on the third floor were trapped, and the fire's survivors either were rescued from upper-story windows or jumped into nets held by firemen.

=== Fire Station No. 16 ===
During the civil rights movement, members of the African-American community pressured the Mayor and City Council of Atlanta to integrate the city's fire department. In 1962, Mayor Ivan Allen Jr. authorized the first hiring of sixteen African American firemen. On April 1, 1963, after completing training, they were housed at Fire Station No. 16, as stations were not yet integrated. Located in 1048 Simpson Rd. (now Joseph E. Boone Blvd.), the station was built upon the former property of Theodore "Tiger" Flowers, the world's first African American middleweight champion. Continuing the efforts to diversify the fire department, Mayor Maynard Jackson ordered the hiring of seven African-American women to serve as firefighters in 1977.

=== Bluffton University bus accident ===
The Bluffton University bus accident was an automobile crash that occurred during the early morning hours of March 2, 2007, on Interstate 75 in Atlanta. A chartered motorcoach was carrying 33 members of the Bluffton University baseball team when at about 5:38 am EST, the bus rolled off of an overpass killing seven and injuring 29 others. The Atlanta Fire Rescue Department was the primary agency on scene for the crash.

== See also ==
- Atlanta Public Safety Training Center
