= Inholding =

Privately owned enclave surrounded by public land

An inholding is privately owned land inside the boundary of a national park, national forest, state park, or similar publicly owned, protected area. In-holdings result from private ownership of lands predating the designation of the park or forest area, or the expansion of the park area to encompass the privately owned property. In the United States, the main causes of inholdings is that all of the Federal land-management agencies were formed over a century after the government sold and issued land grants to private citizens to fund the administration of the United States. When the park system was formed, many of these now-called "inholdings" had been in private ownership for generations and not available for sale when the park was formed. Over the last several decades, conservation groups have lobbied the United States Congress to acquire private residences especially within designated wilderness areas, either by direct purchase or via land exchange which trades the inholding for other federal lands located outside of national parks or wilderness areas.

== Rights and regulations ==
Generally, owners of inholdings are allowed to use their properties in a manner similar to other private property owners in their state. However, they may be subject to additional federal and agency-specific regulations regarding access to their homes and use of their lands by their Federal agency neighbors.

Under the Wilderness Act (1964), the designated area cannot include the privately owned property within the border. Under the Act, federal agencies have an obligation to provide property owners "adequate access" across public lands should their property lie within the designated wilderness boundary. As such, many public agencies have allowed limited use roads to be built in wilderness areas. Under the Eastern Wilderness Act, public agencies are allowed to seize wilderness inholdings if the owner of the inholding manages their land in a manner "incompatible with management of such area as wilderness".

== Notable examples ==
- Adirondack Park, New York is notable among parks in the United States for about 52 percent of its area being privately owned inholdings
- Broad Channel, Queens
- The state of Wyoming owns many inholdings in Grand Teton National Park, Wyoming
- The King Center in Martin Luther King Jr. National Historical Park, Atlanta, Georgia
- Moose, Wyoming
- Native inholdings in Tongass National Forest, Alaska
