= Historic mills of the Atlanta area =

There were several historic mills around the metro Atlanta area, for which many of its current-day roads are still named. Most of the mills date back to the 1820s and 1830s, and were built along the area's many streams. The locations of many of these mills are shown on a map of 1875 showing U. S. military operations around Atlanta in 1864. This map is now located in the U. S. Library of Congress but can be seen on the webpage linked here.

== Akers Mill ==
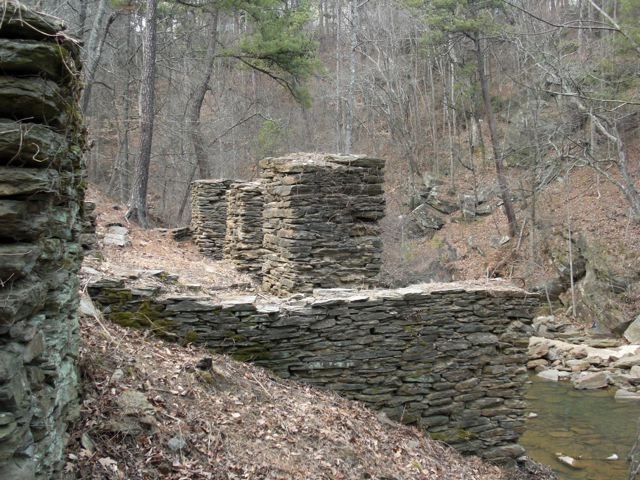
The ruins of Akers Mill

Akers Mill was located on Rottenwood Creek near Vinings. Located within the modern Cumberland/Galleria area, Akers Mill Road runs west from Powers Ferry Road at Interstate 285, immediately north of the Chattahoochee River, then turns south on Cumberland Boulevard, then departs west again after one "block", crossing Interstate 75 and then Cobb Parkway, and forming the southern boundary of the Cumberland Mall property.

== Anderson Mill ==
Near Austell.

== Arnold Mill ==
Arnold Mill, Georgia was located in southeastern Cherokee County, Georgia, east of Woodstock, Georgia. Arnold Mill Road runs east from Main Street (former Georgia 5) in the exact center of downtown Woodstock to meet Hickory Flat Highway (Georgia 140), which continues as Arnold Mill Road southeast through Milton to Crabapple between Roswell and Alpharetta. West of Main Street in Woodstock, it becomes Towne Lake Parkway. The name is associated with an Arnold Mill post office named for Givens W. Arnold, located on present-day Arnold Mill Road near the Little River, which is also the dividing line between Cherokee County and Fulton County. It is unclear whether the Arnold family operated a mill.

== Autrey Mill ==
Sometimes misspelled "Autry" (as in Gene Autry), Autrey Mill Road is along Johns Creek off Old Alabama Road about 2 miles from Medlock Bridge Road in the city of Johns Creek, Georgia, as is the Autrey Mill Nature Preserve and Heritage Center.

== Barnes Mill ==
Barnes Mill Road is just east-northeast of Marietta. Its eastern terminus is at Georgia 120 (Roswell Road) and ascends Blackjack Mountain. The road was severed by Interstate 75.

== Black's Mill ==
Black's Mill Road is named for a small grist mill that was once in Dawsonville, Georgia and was owned and operated by Noah and Sarah Black.

== Blake's Mill ==
This antebellum mill was owned and operated by John Blake (1798–1854) and was located on Shallowford Road near I-85, northeast of Atlanta in DeKalb County.

== Brick Mill ==
Near Canton.

== Brown's Mill ==
The ruins are gone, but the site is located southeast of Atlanta at Georgia Highway 42 and the South River.

== Brandon Mill ==
Near Sandy Springs.

== Cobb's Mill ==
Just east of the Atlanta city limits at 1510 Key Rd. at Intrenchment Creek Water Plant stood a grist mill operated by William Cobb, a DeKalb County pioneer. The mill was a notable landmark in the movement of Confederate forces to the field of the Battle of Atlanta, fought July 22, 1864.

== Cochran Mill ==
Located in Southwest Fulton County in Chattahoochee Hills.

== Collier Mill ==
Located right of Collier Road in Buckhead along Tanyard Creek, the Collier's grist mill was at the center of a key Civil War battle, the Battle of Peachtree Creek. It was located on the lands of Andrew Jackson Collier. Bronze markers in Tanyard Creek Park and old millstones and markers at the corner of Redland Drive and Collier Rd. recall this history.

== Connolly's Grist Mill ==
Located on one of the three main branches of Utoy Creek that flow North West from East Point, Thomas Connolly established a grist mill to serve his local plantation and the surrounding community in 1850. Confederate Troops of Cleburnes Division, Hardees Corps were entrenched overlooking the mill. The mill was destroyed several times by flood and rebuilt until 1910 when it was destroyed by the US Sanitary Commission to prevent the spread of mosquitoes and malaria and flu after the epidemics in 1910-1919. The mill pond still exists and is a scenic site along the former Chattahoochee, now Connolly Drive in East Point, GA.

== Connolly Saw Mill ==
Established in 1850 by Thomas Connolly, located at the juncture of three tributaries of South Utoy Creek, A large dam supported a saw mill to meet lumber needs in the Utoy and East Point Areas of Fulton County. The Dam site was destroyed in 1963 with the construction of the GA Hwy 166 Lakewood Freeway. The Millpond prevented the direct assault of the US XXIII Corps during August 1864 along South Utoy Creek.

== Durand's Mill ==
Durand's Mill was a water-powered sawmill and factory operated in the 1860s by Samuel A. Durand (1822–1891), and later by Fredrick A. Williams (1817–1883). Williams' name designated the old road now known as Briarcliff and Williams Mill Road. Later, J.F. Wallace (1840–1902) succeeded Williams. His name was given to Wallace Station, a former stop on the Seaboard Railroad, and the road to Emory University where it joins Clifton Road. Federal 4th Corps troops crossed the South Fork of Peachtree Creek at Durand's Mill on July 20, 1864 during their advance upon Atlanta.

== Evans Mill ==
Near Lithonia.

== Henderson Mill ==
Located near Henderson Creek, one-tenth of a mile south of Midvale Road, in unincorporated DeKalb County, and named for Greenville Henderson (1792–1869).

== Herrings Mill ==
Situated on the North Fork of Utoy Creek, the Grist mill was in operation in 1850. Union troops of the US XIV Corps, Johnson's Division, crossed the mill pond on August 3, 1864, in an attempt to break the Confederate defenses at Utoy Creek, GA. The Herring House was used as a headquarters by General Sherman on August 3–4, 1864.

== Houston Mill ==
In 1876, the Houston Mill was built on the south fork of Peachtree Creek in Decatur, and used to grind corn (maize) into cornmeal. It was owned by Major Washington Jackson Houston, who in 1900 converted it into the first hydroelectric power plant in DeKalb County, and formed the Decatur Light, Power and Water Company.

Located above the confluence of Peavine Creek and South Fork Peachtree Creek, the dam itself still remains, and the remnants of the millrace are still visible along the creek in Emory University's Hahn Woods park.

== Howell's Mills ==
Howell's Mill was located near Atlanta. Named after Clark Howell, it was located on Peachtree Creek. Its original site was located just west of where the road bearing its name, Howell Mill Road, crosses the creek.

There were actually several Howell's Mills. In addition to the most well-known mill on Peachtree Creek, the Howell family established two other mills on Nancy Creek to the northwest. The mill located south of West Paces Ferry Road and Nancy Creek was known as 'Charley Howell's Mill', after Charles Augustus Howell (born Nov. 1845), one of Clark Howell's sons. It is now the site of the Hardin Construction Company.

The Atlanta Humane Society is located on Howell Mill Road, leading one former morning show host on a local radio station to call it "Howlllllll" Mill Road when doing their pet of the week segments.

== Johnston's Mill ==
Johnston's Mill was owned by William Johnston (1789–1855) and was a landmark of Federal military operations in the summer of 1864. It was on Briarwood Road between Buford Highway and I-85 on the North Fork of Peachtree Creek.

== Lee's Mill ==
Between Fayetteville and Tyrone on the Flint River. The road runs from the intersection with GA 92 in Fayetteville (New Hope Road is the continuation of the thoroughfare) to Sandy Creek Road outside of Tyrone. A roundabout was recently added midway along the road due to the construction of Veteran's Parkway. It is cited on the 1864 Civil War Military Atlas.

South of the Hartsfield-Jackson International Airport, and near the towns of Forest Park and Riverdale, is another mill named Lee's Mill. It was built during the Civil War by the father of pioneer W.J. Lee. The mill would be named after W.J. Lee, who was also the county surveyor, and would own the mill afterwards. Lee's Mill operated since then, until 1933 after the death of W.J. Lee.

Floods by the Flint River, and nearby tributaries such as Sullivan Creek and Mud Creek, erode what is left of Lee's Mill's ruins. Luck Stone, a Virginia-based company, owns the land at Lee's Mill. Lee's Mill can be accessed via Lee's Mill Road, in northern unincorporated Clayton County, and the mill is located by the Flint River and Sullivan Creek.

== Mason Mill ==
Mason Mill was a flour mill built by Ezekiel Mason before the Civil War in the 1850s, and located east of Atlanta on the bank of Burnt Fork Creek close to its merger with the south fork of Peachtree Creek near Decatur. Mason Mill Road meets Clairmont Road near this point. Built by slaves, the sluice or flume for the mill ran back to Clairmont Lake.

In 1906 the property was sold to the City of Decatur, and Mason Mill became a part of the Decatur Waterworks, a complex system supplying drinking water to the City until 1947.

== Moore's Mill ==
Moore's Mill was established along Peachtree Creek in 1828 by Thomas Moore. A Civil War battle took place here on July 19, 1864.

== Mundy's Mill ==
Mundy's Mill was located between Jonesboro and Fayetteville.

== Pace's Mill ==
Pace's Mill belonged to Hardy Pace, one of Atlanta's founders. Located in what is now Vinings (formerly Paces), Paces Mill Road is a small spur route off of the much busier Paces Ferry Road.

== Paper Mill ==
The Marietta Paper Mill was built on the banks of Sope Creek as part of an industrial complex, near where it ends into the Chattahoochee River. The original structures which housed the Marietta Paper Mills were incorporated in 1859. The mills were burned by a detachment of Gen. Kenner Garrard's cavalry division on July 5, 1864. It was rebuilt after the war, the mill burned in 1870. It was restored in 1871, and it operated until 1902. Its ruins are still there, protected by the Chattahoochee River National Recreation Area. Located in Cobb County, it is accessible via two-lane Paper Mill Road, which connects to nearby Johnson Ferry Road. In the west, the road briefly combines with Terrell Mill Road just before ending at Lower Roswell Road as Old Paper Mill Road. Paper Mill Road was carried over Sope Creek by a covered bridge, which was burned by arson in the late 1960s.

== Pickett's Mill ==
Pickett's Mill was located near Dallas in Paulding County. It was the site of the Battle of Pickett's Mill during the Civil War.

== Poole's Mill ==
Located in the extreme northwest of Forsyth County, 10-acres in size, Poole's Mill Park's main attraction is the covered bridge over the swift moving Settendown Creek near the center of the thickly forested park. The bridge was built in 1901, and the park is on the National Historic Registry.

== Queen Mill ==
Queen Mill (or Queen's Mill) was opposite Fulton County Airport between Mableton Parkway and Interstate 20. Present day Queen Mill Road is named for the historic mill.

== Rex Mill ==
Located in Clayton County, it was originally built and known as Hollingsworth Mill. Isaiah Hollingsworth built the mill and it is recorded in the U.S. Official Civil War Military Atlas (Map Book). The mill is still standing and is located off Georgia Highway 42 on Rex Road. The mill witnessed the passing of a Division of U.S. General Sherman's Federal Army on November 16, 1864. A popular place known as “Tuckers Cabin” was located within eye site of the mill.

== Rock Mill ==
Near Alpharetta.

== Rope Mill ==
Near Woodstock, Georgia.

== Roswell Mill ==
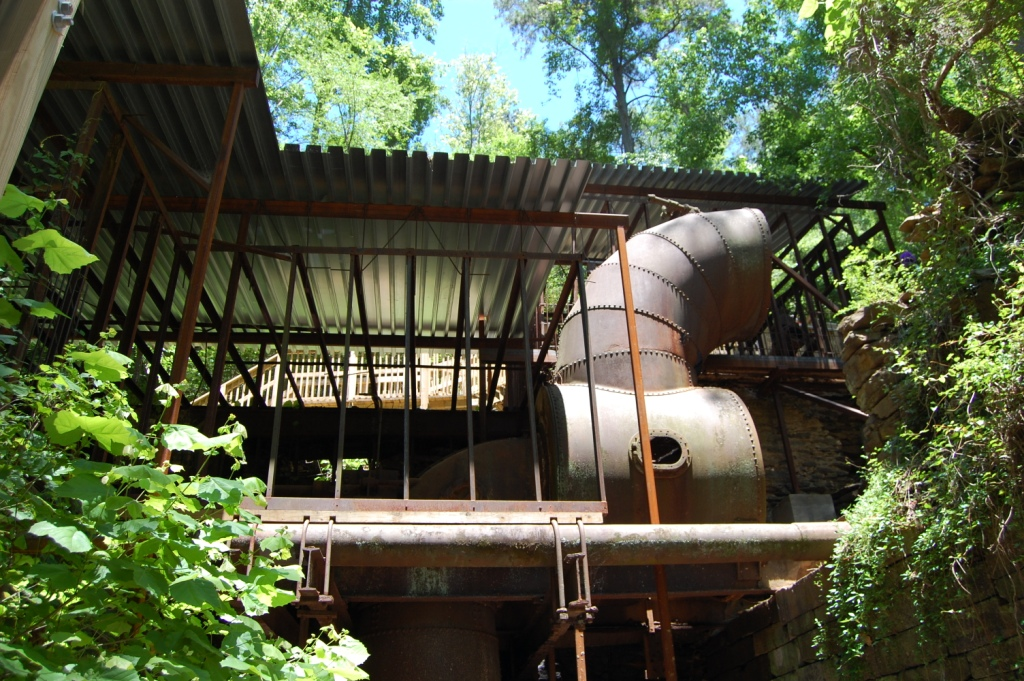
Roswell Mill ruins, May 2009.

Roswell Mill was a cluster of mills located in Fulton County near Vickery Creek in Roswell, Georgia, north of Atlanta. The mills were best known for producing finished textiles from raw materials grown on nearby plantations, and the group was "the largest cotton mill in north Georgia" at its height. The mill grew steadily, at one point producing wool and flour in addition to cotton textiles. This diversification progressed through several phases of ownership well into the 20th century, and the mill continued producing textiles until its eventual shutdown of operations in 1975.

== Sewell Mill ==
Sewell Mill was located on Sewell Mill Creek, a tributary of Sope Creek. Sewell Mill Road is also located entirely in Cobb County, and runs from Georgia 120 (Roswell Road) east of Marietta, northeastward to Johnson Ferry Road. Old Sewell Road also exists. The old ruins of Sewell Mill can still be seen on a property along Sewell Mill Road, just east of Murdock Road.

== Scott Mill ==
Near Canton, Georgia.

== Starr's Mill ==
The property that became Starr's Mill was owned by Hananiah Gilcoat who built the first mill here before his death in 1825. This site, on Whitewater Creek south of Fayetteville, was less than a mile from the boundary between Creek Indian lands and the State of Georgia. Hilliard Starr, who owned the mill from 1866 until 1879, gave the site its current name. After the first two log structures burned, William T. Glower built the current building in 1907. This mill operated until 1959, using a water-powered turbine, instead of a wheel, to grind corn and operate a sawmill. The Starr's Mill site also included a cotton gin and a dynamo that produced electricity for nearby Senoia.

== Terrell's Mill ==
Terrell's Mill was located on the Flint River in Clayton County south of the Atlanta Airport. Terrell's Mill Road is on the Atlanta area maps; however, the mill is no longer there. The mill stone was turned by a water turbine. The mill was built by John Calhoun Terrell and his son Francis Leonard about 1870. The mill was operated the last time around 1942 by Lowell S. Terrell, F. L.'s son. Besides the grist mill, F. L. Terrell operated a saw mill, a syrup mill, a cotton gin, a country store, a farm, and served as justice of the peace. John C. Terrell built his mill about 1858 which was located on the Flint River approximately where the present Delta Air Lines Jet Base is located at the Atlanta Airport. This mill was later known as Stark's Mill on the property of Stark's Dairy. John C. Terrell moved from Pike County Georgia before 1858 to build a mill for Alexander Lynn Huie north of Pineridge Road in Forest Park on Jesters (Murcheons) Creek. He married Alexander's daughter, Sarah Elizabeth Huie, in 1858 soon after building Huie's mill and stayed in the area to raise 5 sons and 5 daughters.

Another Terrell Mill was located in north Atlanta and has no known relationship to the one in Clayton County. Terrell Mill Road runs from Cobb Parkway, northeast under I-75, then gradually curving north to cross Powers Ferry Road and the east end of Delk Road, before ending at Lower Roswell Road. While the name ends at this point, the four-lane divided roadway (an arterial road) continues straight northeast on Lower Roswell Rd. That road was "broken," forcing drivers to make a turn in order to continue on the same road. Just south of there, Terrell Mill Park is located on the southwest side of the road, where it is now concurrent for a short distance with the original Paper Mill Road. The northernmost section of Old Paper Mill Road (the westernmost section of Paper Mill Rd.), north to Lower Roswell Rd., was originally a quarter-mile-long street named Terrell Mill Drive, and Google Maps still identify it as such. In the late 2000s, this section was widened along its eastern side to add an extra lane, which continues up Lower Roswell Rd. to Old Canton Road, bypassing the traffic light there altogether. This section of both roads is now six lanes: three northbound, two southbound, and a center left-turn lane.

Southwest of Powers Ferry Road, the road is also five lanes with a center left-turn lane, while to the north it has a landscaped road median typical of other county roads widened in the 1980s and 1990s. In order to squeeze through an underpass below I-75, it narrows to four lanes and has a steep dip that often floods during thunderstorms as it collects water from both the road and the highway, and from the downslope to nearby Rottenwood Creek. As part of the Northwest Corridor HOV/BRT project, an exit/entrance to and from the reversible HOT lanes was constructed here. Like Northside Drive to the south, the freeway here was built with a landscaped median (where it otherwise has a low median wall), so that it could later accommodate ramps to access future HOV lanes.

Delk Road (Georgia 280 west of I-75) was extended from Powers Ferry Road to Terrell Mill Road in 1986. This intersection was rebuilt in the 2000s. Also in the 1980s, the first Home Depot store was located at Terrell Mill Rd. and Cobb Parkway in Marietta Plaza (originally a Treasure Island, now a Burlington Coat Factory), while its first headquarters was in a nearby office park on Terrell Mill Rd.

== Terry's Mill ==
Terry's Mill was owned and operated by Tom Terry (1823–1861) on Sugar Creek. The grist mill stood 800 yards downstream on Glenwood Ave. just east of I-20. It is cited in military annals recording the movements of Walker's and Bate's divisions of Hardee's corps to the Battle of Atlanta of July 22, 1864. His brother Thomas Terry operated a mill located at Lakewood Park, (future site of the Southeaster Fairgrounds). This large pond fed off the South River and created today's lake at Lakewood Park. Thomas Terry and his wife are buried on Lakewood Avenue at Southbend Park.

== Tilly Mill ==
Tilly Mill Road is located in DeKalb County, in the city of Dunwoody. The road bisects the land on which the mill was located, owned and operated by the Tilly family in the early 20th century. The name also describes the residential district which now occupies the land.

== Tribble Mill ==
The 700-acre forested Tribble Mill Park is located in Gwinnett County, near Sugarloaf Parkway between Lawrenceville and Snellville, Georgia. The mill that gives Tribble Mill its name ran on a river on the property from the 1830s until the 1950s. The land was privately owned up until the 1990s. Ozora Lake is the centerpiece of Tribble Mill Park, offering fishing and boating. The park's 2.8-mile paved trail winds nearly level elevation around the lake. Multiple lots in the park offer free parking and easy access to the trail. The park is dog-friendly (leashes are required), with dog pick-up stations dotting the trail's length.

== Tucker Mill ==
The Old Tucker Mill is an antebellum-era structure located in historic downtown Tucker, Georgia. It is currently operated as an antique store, at 4290 Railroad Avenue.

The Old Tucker Mill housed a corn mill and a sawmill at the turn of the 20th century. It's one of the oldest buildings still standing in Tucker.

== White's Mill ==
In Atlanta. The mill was founded by John White in Dekalb county, and subsequently run by his sons. The facilities included a lumber mill as well as a grist mill located on what is now known as White's Mill Road, between Interstate 20 and Flat Shoals Road east of Atlanta. John White is buried at a small cemetery on Candler Road just south of I-20.

The Mill additionally had a cotton gin attached as a part of the family complex, and continued in operation until the mid 1900s. During the Civil War the mill served to supply large size timber to the Confederacy. One of John's sons, William Coker White, who was a lieutenant in the 42nd Georgia C.S.A. (Dekalb Rangers) along with his brother Nicolas, came home early in the war to help oversee this aspect of the operation. According to family oral tradition, the lumber was then hauled over to the Chattahoochee River by wagon (to Aderhold's Ferry near present-day Six Flags) and floated down to Columbus, Georgia where the larger timbers were used in the construction of armored gunboat frames. (Note that one of William's sons (James Wesley) married one of the Aderhold girls, Alzie.) Quite naturally when Gen. William T. Sherman burned the city of Atlanta, he also found it advisable to burn much of the manufacturing infrastructure in the surrounding areas such as Dekalb County, including White's mill. After the war William Coker and his brother John Wesley rebuilt and continued to run the mill complex together. The economic circumstances after the war however, were such that all the members of the extended White families (John White had 16 children and each of these had their own households) could not rely upon the mill complex for support. Thus the family split up, with a number of White families (including William Coker White) moving as a group west of Atlanta to Haralson County, Georgia. William is buried in Pleasant Grove Church Cemetery in Haralson County along with a number of other members of the White family. John White is buried next to his second wife Nancy Mapp Wells and beside a cenotaph for his first wife Hetty Layfield.

== Wilkerson Mill ==
Located on private property on the grounds of Wilkerson Mill Gardens, on Little Bear Creek in the City of Chattahoochee Hills.

== Williams Mill ==
This mill was on the south fork of Peachtree Creek as the Williams Mill Road is today's Briarcliff Road, which used to continue southwesterly from where it crossed Ponce de Leon Avenue. A remnant of the old road name still exists that intersects North Highland Avenue just south of North Avenue near the Carter Center. The mill was operated by furniture maker and sawmill operator Frederick A. Williams (1817–1883), son of Ammi Williams. It was purchased by Sam Durand before the Civil War, and military maps labeled it Durand's Mill on Williams Mill Road. It was last known as Wallace's Mill.

== Wilsons Mill ==
Operated by Judge Wilson on a tributary of North Utoy Creek, the grist mill supported the Wilson Plantation and local farmers. Established in 1858 it was in operation during the Civil War and Union Troops were encamped adjacent to the mill in August 1864.

== Willis Mill ==
This mill was on a tributary of South Utoy Creek, established in 1830 in Land Lot 200 of then Dekalb County, now Fulton. Joseph Willis was the miller and ground corn into meal and grits for early settlers in the Utoy Post Office Community CIRCA 1822. Customers included Dekalb County's first Physician Dr William Gilbert, and his Brother Dr Joshua Gilbert, the White family, Childress Family, Bryant Family, Head Family. The mill was the dividing line between the Union XXIII Army Corps and the Confederates of Bates Division during the siege of Atlanta in August 1864.

Near East Point, GA.

== See also ==
- Historic bridges of the Atlanta area
- Historic ferries of the Atlanta area
