= 2009 Southeastern United States floods =

Natural disaster in the United States

2009 Southeast United States floods
Meteorological history
- Duration: September 15–23, 2009

Overall effects
- Fatalities: 10
- Damage: At least $500 million
- Areas affected: Northern Georgia, Tennessee, Alabama, Mississippi and Arkansas

The September 2009 Southeastern United States floods were a group of floods that affected several counties throughout northern Georgia, Tennessee, Alabama, Mississippi, and Arkansas. The worst flooding occurred across the Atlanta metropolitan area. Continuous rain, spawned by moisture pulled from the Gulf of Mexico, fell faster than the local watersheds could drain the runoff.

Initial damages from around the state were estimated at $250 million. On September 26, Georgia Insurance Commissioner John Oxendine raised the estimated cost to $500 million with the potential for it to rise. Some 20,000 homes, businesses and other buildings received major damage and 17 Georgia counties received Federal Disaster Declarations. The flood is blamed for at least ten deaths.

The floods were historic, breaking records that went back more than a century in some locations. The Chattahoochee River, the largest river in the region, measured water levels at a 500-year flood level.

== Beginnings ==
The floods occurred not long after the end of the 2006–2008 Southeastern United States drought. Rain began falling on the Atlanta area on September 15, 2009, with the National Weather Service (NWS) reporting only 0.04 inches that day at the Hartsfield–Jackson Atlanta International Airport. Additional rain fell throughout the week, with only a trace amount recorded for September 18. However, a large rain event began to inundate the area on September 19. The official NWS monitoring station at the Atlanta airport recorded 3.70 inches (94 mm) of rainfall from daybreak to 8pm (more than doubling the previous record for rainfall on that date), while outlying monitoring stations recorded 5 inches (130 mm) of rainfall in a 13-hour period. Flooding began in one neighborhood that day, with the remainder of the area placed under a flash flood watch for the rest of the weekend.

== Effects ==
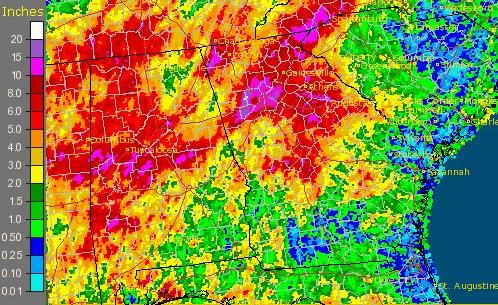
NOAA rainfall map for one-week period ending September 23, 2009

Hundreds of people were rescued by boat from their homes, and at least ten people died, mostly in their cars by driving where water crossed the road, which motorists were repeatedly warned against on local radio and TV. The American Red Cross started emergency shelters in each county affected by the floods. Most Atlanta area school districts were closed September 21 due to floodwaters and road closures which made school bus routes longer and more dangerous.

=== Chattahoochee River ===
The Chattahoochee rose to the highest levels since the Buford Dam was built. Water levels along the river rose over the 0.2 percent chance exceedence (500-year) flood at the gage location. The River reached its second-highest level ever in Vinings at Paces Ferry Road, and would have surpassed its 1916 record were it not for the impoundment built in the 1950s. Along the river in both Vinings and Roswell, a one percent chance exceedence (100-year flood) level was measured.

Peachtree Creek, a tributary of the Chattahoochee, topped its stream gauge and the bridge itself at Northside Drive, but remained just below its 1916 record. However, Nancy Creek–another Chattahoochee River tributary–did reach a record level, destroying the Peachtree-Dunwoody Road bridge (which would reopen on March 23, 2010).

The western side of the Interstate 285 beltway crosses the Chattahoochee River. This section of the interstate was completely underwater for several days. Many of the roller coasters and rides at Six Flags Over Georgia were partly underwater, with at least 80% of Great American Scream Machine submerged by the Chattahoochee River.

Located along the Chattahoochee River in west Atlanta, the R.M. Clayton sewage treatment plant, the largest in the Southeastern U.S., was swamped with four feet of water as the river rose by twelve additional feet. Millions of gallons of untreated sewage were released into the rising waters. Other plants in Cobb and Gwinnett counties experienced similar spills. A Kellogg Company food plant, also located near the Chattahoochee, was flooded, resulting in the closure of the plant and a subsequent national shortage of frozen waffles.

=== Lake Lanier and Lake Allatoona ===
Lake Lanier rose quickly, while Lake Allatoona soared to more than ten feet or three meters over full pool, using its flood reserve capacity for the first time after years of the 2006–2009 Southeastern U.S. drought. Lake Allatoona reached its highest level since 1990.

=== Sweetwater Creek ===
On Monday, September 21, Sweetwater Creek rose to its highest level ever recorded. On September 22, The United States Geological Survey measured the greatest flow ever recorded on Sweetwater Creek, at 28,000 cubic feet per second (790 m^{3}/s). The flooding from the creek was met with water from the swollen Chattahoochee River, which blocked Interstate 20 west of Atlanta for two days. Many homes and businesses in the area were completely submerged.

=== Cherokee County ===
Interstate 575 was heavily blocked by Noonday Creek, which also blocked several other roads including Georgia State Route 92. The Little River also caused major problems in the same area, blocking the original parallel route of Georgia 5 (which was replaced by I-575 in the 1980s), and Arnold Mill Road, north and east of Woodstock. Commuters trying to get back home to Cherokee county found it took hours due to the numerous road closures and unmarked detours, extending the September 21, 2009 rush hour until after 9:00pm as people sat in gridlocked traffic.

=== Cobb County ===
Kennesaw State University in Cobb County received significant flooding on several parts of campus including the east parking deck. Several buildings and dormitories along Campus Loop Drive were flooded from a nearby creek and lake. Water rushing into the Social Science building reportedly rose up to the bottom of the hand-rail of the first floor stairs. Classes were cancelled at 1:00pm on Monday, September 21 for the remainder of the day and again on September 22 and 23 while damage was assessed and clean-up began.

Pope High School was surrounded by water, which receded in time to let the students leave. Clarkdale Elementary School was flooded to the roof. Students were evacuated early September 21, while waters were ankle-deep. The Cobb County School District, wary of rising waters, let middle school students leave before elementary and high schools. Though because of heavy rainfall in Legacy Park subdivision, 3 buses had to return to Awtrey Middle School. Powder Springs Park and parts of Brownsville Road were completely submerged by floodwaters.

=== City of Atlanta ===
Inside the city limits of Atlanta, several neighborhoods were underwater, including Peachtree Hills. The Downtown Connector, a section where Interstate 75 and Interstate 85 run concurrent with each other and one of Georgia's busiest expressways, was submerged by the floodwaters. Several cars were swept into the water before police could redirect traffic.

== Appalachian Mountains landslides ==
As a result of the flooding rains, many parts of the southern Appalachian Mountains became saturated, causing a number of landslides and rockslides, including one in October 2009 on Interstate 40 in the Great Smoky Mountains of North Carolina that closed the highway for several months.

Another rockslide occurred on U.S. Route 64 in Tennessee in November 2009. This section, known as the Ocoee Scenic Byway, was closed for several months. The rockslide was captured in a dramatic video which aired on many television news outlets.

A rockslide also occurred in February 2010 on U.S. Route 129. It closed the section known as "The Dragon", along the Tennessee/North Carolina border, until summer.

== Government response ==
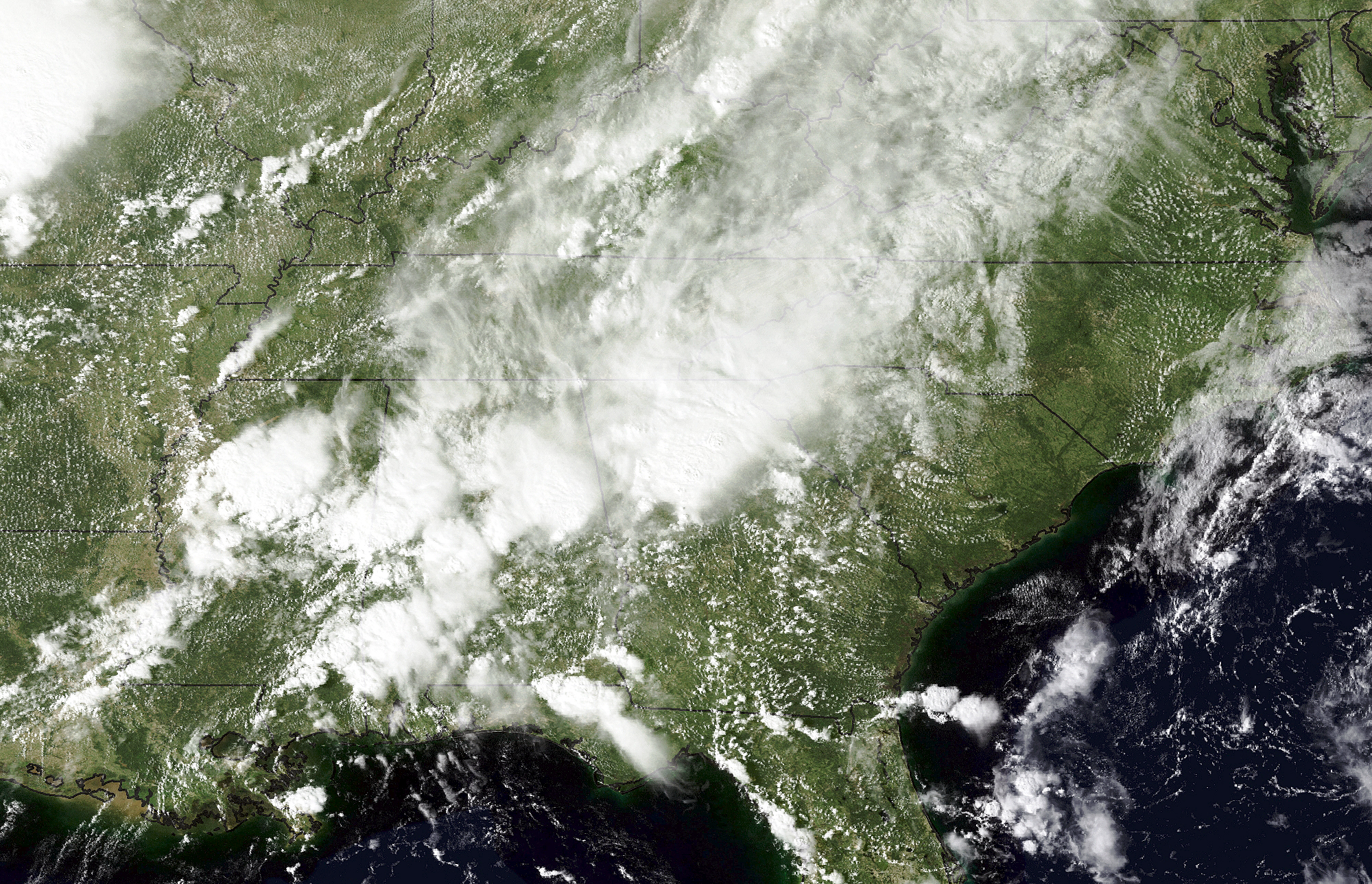
Storms on September 21 were responsible for flooding over the South Eastern United States

The governor of Georgia, Sonny Perdue, declared a state of emergency, and requested a disaster declaration from the U.S. government for 17 counties in Georgia. The counties were Bartow, Carroll, Cherokee, Cobb, Coweta, DeKalb, Douglas, Fulton, Gwinnett, Heard, Newton, Paulding, and Rockdale counties around Metro Atlanta, Catoosa, Chattooga, and Walker counties in far northwest Georgia and Stephens County in northeast Georgia. While state military assets, including elements of the Georgia National Guard and the Georgia State Defense Force, were placed on a heightened state of alert immediately following Governor Perdue's declaration, there were no reports that any military personnel were fielded in significant numbers.

Beginning on September 24, President Barack Obama approved a Federal disaster declaration for all 17 Georgia counties as requested by Governor Perdue.

In the wake of these floods, the Georgia Emergency Management Agency worked to increase flood preparedness in Georgia through its Ready Georgia campaign.

== See also ==
- January 2013 Southeastern United States floods
- July 2013 Southeastern United States floods
