= Paces, Atlanta =

Neighborhood of Atlanta, Georgia

Coordinates: 33.8474°N 84.446°W

Paces is a neighborhood of Atlanta, US. It is part of the Buckhead district and is located in the far northwest corner of the city. Paces is bounded on the northwest by the Chattahoochee River, which is also the Cobb/Fulton county line. Just across the river in Cobb is the unincorporated community of Vinings, which was originally known as Paces after founder Hardy Pace, who operated Pace's Ferry. Cumberland is also located on the other side of the river. It is perhaps Atlanta's most affluent neighborhood, with many houses selling in the US$5–$7 million range, and some for more than $20 million.

== History ==
At the southern end of Paces where Peachtree Creek flows into the Chattachoochee was the Creek Indian settlement of Standing Peachtree, the closest Indian settlement to what became Atlanta.

== Geography ==
The main road through the community is Paces Ferry, which runs northwestward from West Paces Ferry Road (which in turn continues west to a dead-end after Ridgewood Rd). Northside Parkway is another major road through the area, carrying U.S. 41 and State Route 3, and becoming Cobb Parkway across the river in Cumberland. This runs along the northeast edge of Paces, in that part being a frontage road along Interstate 75, which divides Paces from the rest of Buckhead aside from the Underwood Hills, Margaret Mitchell, and Pleasant Hill neighborhoods which are also West of I-75. West Wesley Road runs South of the center of Paces, and Paces continues almost until where Ridgewood Rd meets Moore's Mill Road in Bolton, though stops slightly before that at the bridge across Cross Creek. It is also bordered by Nancy Creek on the Southeast.

== Notable resident ==
In 2007 Tyler Perry bought a 17-acre (6.9 ha) estate in Paces at 4110 Paces Ferry Road NW. However, it was sold a few years after.
