= Mount Wilkinson =

Mountain in United States of America

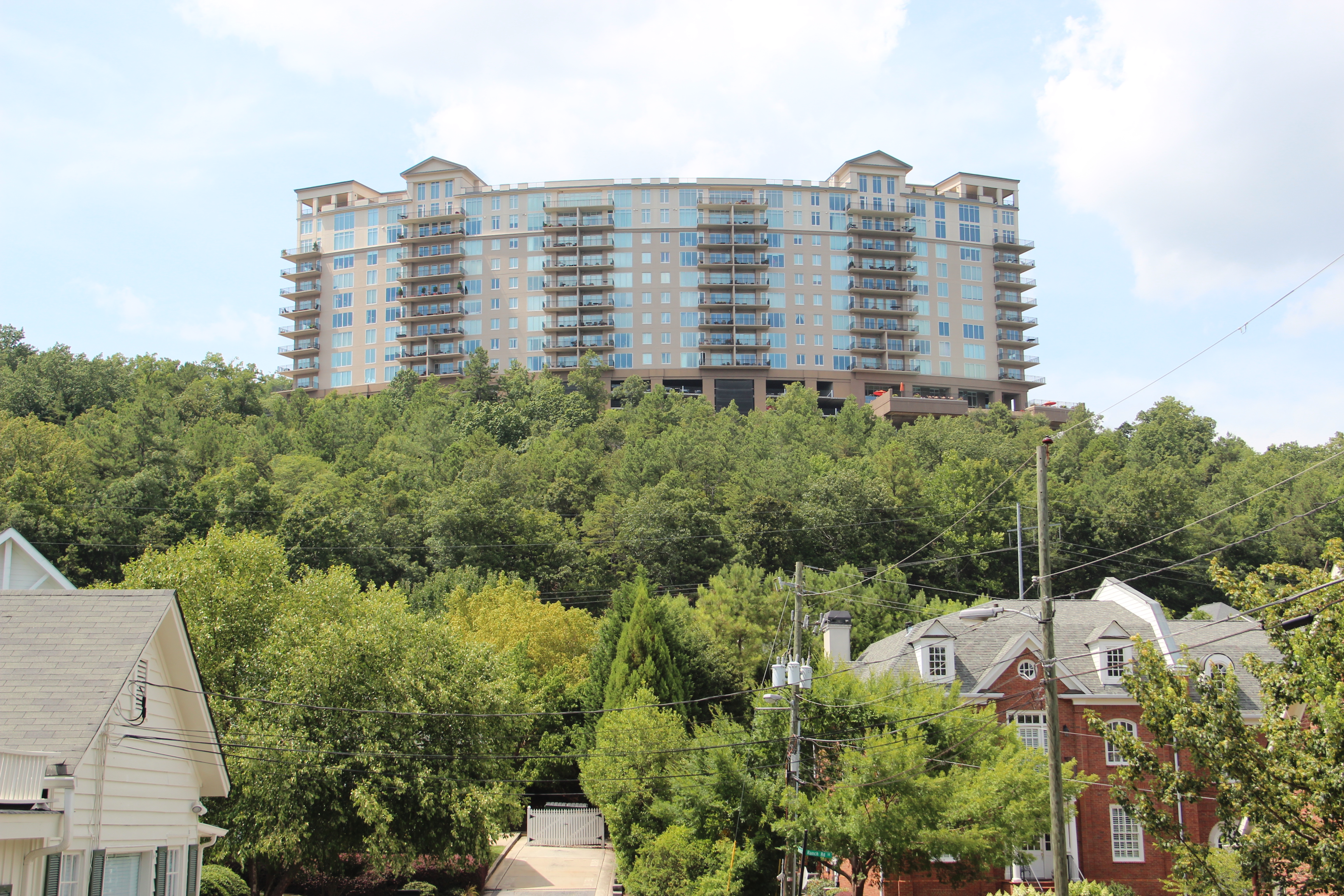
- Mount Wilkinson in 2015

Highest point
- Elevation: 1,165 ft (355 m)
- Coordinates: 33°52′11″N 84°28′06″W

Geography
- Location within Georgia
- Location: Cobb County, Georgia, U.S.
- Parent range: Appalachian Mountains
- Topo map: USGS Northwest Atlanta

Mount Wilkinson is a low mountain immediately north-northwest of and directly overlooking downtown Vinings, in southeast Cobb County, Georgia, USA. Although it rises significantly from the surrounding terrain, it is actually at or slightly below the average elevation for the region, as it is in the Chattahoochee River valley. Formerly called Signal Mountain, today it is commonly known as Vinings Mountain.

It is said that in 1864, U.S. Army General William T. Sherman got his first look at the church spires of Atlanta from the summit of Vinings Mountain.

The mountain, left only partly forested, is now topped with high-rise office towers, part of the Cumberland/Galleria edge city of metro Atlanta. Among these buildings lies a small, private cemetery in which Hardy Pace (1785–1864), a founder of Vinings and operator of Pace's Ferry, is buried.

== Namesake ==
Mount Wilkinson was named in honor of Mell B. Wilkinson, co-founder and first president of the Atlanta Scout Council. The mountain was once the location of the Bert Adams Scout Camp (now located near Covington, Georgia).

The Atlanta Rotary Club contributed one half of the $5,000 cost of the mountain and the other half was quickly made up by smaller gifts.

The camp also included land that was sold to build the present day Cumberland Mall and surrounding office complexes and apartments. Streets in the immediate vicinity are still named for the camp (e.g. Bert Adams Road) and the mountain (e.g. Mt. Wilkinson Parkway).
