= Bert Adams Scout Reservation =

Summer camp in north Georgia (U.S. State) operated by the Boy Scouts of America

Bert Adams Scout Camp
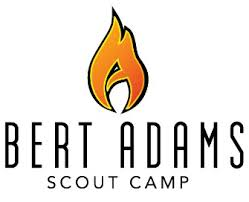
- Bert Adams Scout Camp logo
- Owner: Atlanta Area Council
- Location: Covington, Georgia
- Coordinates: 33.477504°N 83.851953°W
- Camp size: 1,300-acre (5.3 km^{2})
- Founded: June 11, 1927
- Website www.campbertadams.org

Bert Adams Scout Camp is a long-term overnight camp owned and operated by the Atlanta Area Council of the Boy Scouts of America. Bert Adams is located south of Covington, Georgia, situated on Lake Bulow Campbell; the camp is one of three major BSA summer camps in the Atlanta Area Council. The camp is named after Albert S. "Bert" Adams, a "beloved leader in the city of Atlanta", and the president of what was then called the "Atlanta Council of the Boy Scouts", during the 1920s.

Bert Adams has consistently been listed as one of the best scout camps in the United States by Boys Life and Scouting Magazines.

== History ==
=== Camp Friendly ===
Early proposals for a new summer camp in the council began as early as summer of 1916, however, the United States entry into World War I delayed any potential progress on these proposals. After the war concluded, one of the original proposers of a new summer camp, Mr. Roland Shine, directed a temporary summer camp, Camp Friendly, which acted as a placeholder until a new permanent camp could be established. After some time, though "successful as a summer event", Camp Friendly, did not fully meet the needs and goals of the council, and was cancelled after its 1922 season.

=== First Permanent Camp ===
==== Construction ====
After the closing of Camp Friendly, a representative of the council and advocator for the building of a new summer camp, Richard Darby, began the search for a location for a permanent camp. The property he settled upon was located in Vinings, about 11 miles (17.7 Kilometers) north of Atlanta. The plats the site was located on then were then purchased one by one by Albert "Bert" Adams (the president of the Atlanta Area Council, and the later namesake of the camp) and the Adams-Cates Realty Company, and began the building of the camp. After the land purchase was completed, sporadic and unorganized construction of the camp began shortly after. A dam was constructed on a creek running through the property, with the resulting 1.3 acre lake being named after Richard Darby, in recognition of his work in championing the idea of building a new camp. Though parts of the camp were still being built at the time, the core of the camp began welcoming scouts in the autumn of 1925.

Much to the sadness of the council and Scouters throughout Central and North Georgia, Albert "Bert" Adams died in December 1926, before the construction on the camp could be completed. Shortly thereafter, Chairman Law of the Atlanta Area Council Executive Board proposed that the new camp, once completed, be named in his honor. The proposal was approved by the Council Executive Board unanimously.

Due to Adams' death, financial troubles early on, and the slow and relatively unorganized rate of construction, the completion of the building of the camp missed its summer of 1926 deadline. A large campaign in order to raise the remaining $75,000 1926 USD (the equivalent of $1.08 Million USD in 2018), began in February 1927. The campaign was hugely successful and its goal was met on April 3 of that same year. On April 3, 1927, a groundbreaking ceremony for what would become the main structure of the camp, a 60 x 100 foot (~19 x 33 meters) dining hall, was conducted by the son of Albert Adams, Life Scout Albert S. Adams Jr.

==== Dedication ====
On June 11, 1927, the camp was officially dedicated and opening with a grand opening ceremony. Many of the general public from cities throughout the Atlanta area were in attendance. Among guests of particular note would include, Governor Clifford Walker, Atlanta Mayor I.N. Ragsdale, and Chief Scout Executive James E. West. In his address, West indicated that Atlanta was one of only a few councils at that time to own any overnight camping facilities.

==== Relocation ====
The camp continued operation at that site for 33 years, until 1960, when a new larger site was found, and moved to.

=== Current Permanent Camp ===
Following the 1960 summer season, with the original camp facilities growing old and falling to disrepair, a new site was chosen just south of Covington, Georgia. This site has been the location of the camp since that time. The current camp has received multiple commendations and awards from various scouting magazines for its layout, events, camp staff, and facilities.

==== 2018 Accident ====
On June 25, 2018, a severe weather storm came into the camp. Elijah Knight (14 at the time), went to his tent with two of his friends, seeking shelter from the storm. Minutes later, a tree came crashing down on their tent, crushing Knight. The other two boys escaped unharmed. Knight was found dead just minutes after.

== Climate ==
=== Weather ===
Climate data for Covington, Georgia
Month	Jan	Feb	Mar	Apr	May	Jun	Jul	Aug	Sep	Oct	Nov	Dec	Year
Record high °F (°C)	81 (27)	88 (31)	90 (32)	95 (35)	100 (38)	105 (41)	110 (43)	105 (41)	103 (39)	98 (37)	87 (31)	79 (26)	110 (43)
Mean daily maximum °F (°C)	52.8 (11.6)	57.3 (14.1)	65.7 (18.7)	73.6 (23.1)	81.1 (27.3)	87.5 (30.8)	90.0 (32.2)	88.8 (31.6)	83.3 (28.5)	73.5 (23.1)	64.4 (18.0)	54.7 (12.6)	72.7 (22.6)
Daily mean °F (°C)	42.4 (5.8)	46.3 (7.9)	53.6 (12.0)	61.1 (16.2)	69.4 (20.8)	76.9 (24.9)	79.9 (26.6)	79.2 (26.2)	73.1 (22.8)	62.5 (16.9)	53.1 (11.7)	44.5 (6.9)	61.8 (16.6)
Mean daily minimum °F (°C)	32.0 (0.0)	35.4 (1.9)	41.5 (5.3)	48.6 (9.2)	57.7 (14.3)	66.3 (19.1)	69.8 (21.0)	69.5 (20.8)	62.9 (17.2)	51.4 (10.8)	41.8 (5.4)	34.2 (1.2)	50.9 (10.5)
Record low °F (°C)	−7 (−22)	−10 (−23)	9 (−13)	24 (−4)	31 (−1)	44 (7)	52 (11)	51 (11)	34 (1)	23 (−5)	5 (−15)	0 (−18)	−10 (−23)
Average precipitation inches (mm)	4.20 (107)	4.72 (120)	4.84 (123)	3.19 (81)	3.21 (82)	4.23 (107)	4.48 (114)	4.22 (107)	4.07 (103)	3.26 (83)	3.93 (100)	4.07 (103)	48.42 (1,230)

Due to the camp's location in the North Georgia region of the American South, the camp often sees moderate to severe weather. This particularly includes thunderstorms and rain. In order to counter this, the council has several safety precautions and campwide alarms in place in an attempt to prevent incident.

In June 2018, there was an incident where a Scout was killed as a result of a tree falling on the Scout's tent after severe storm force winds pushed the tree down.

=== Fauna ===
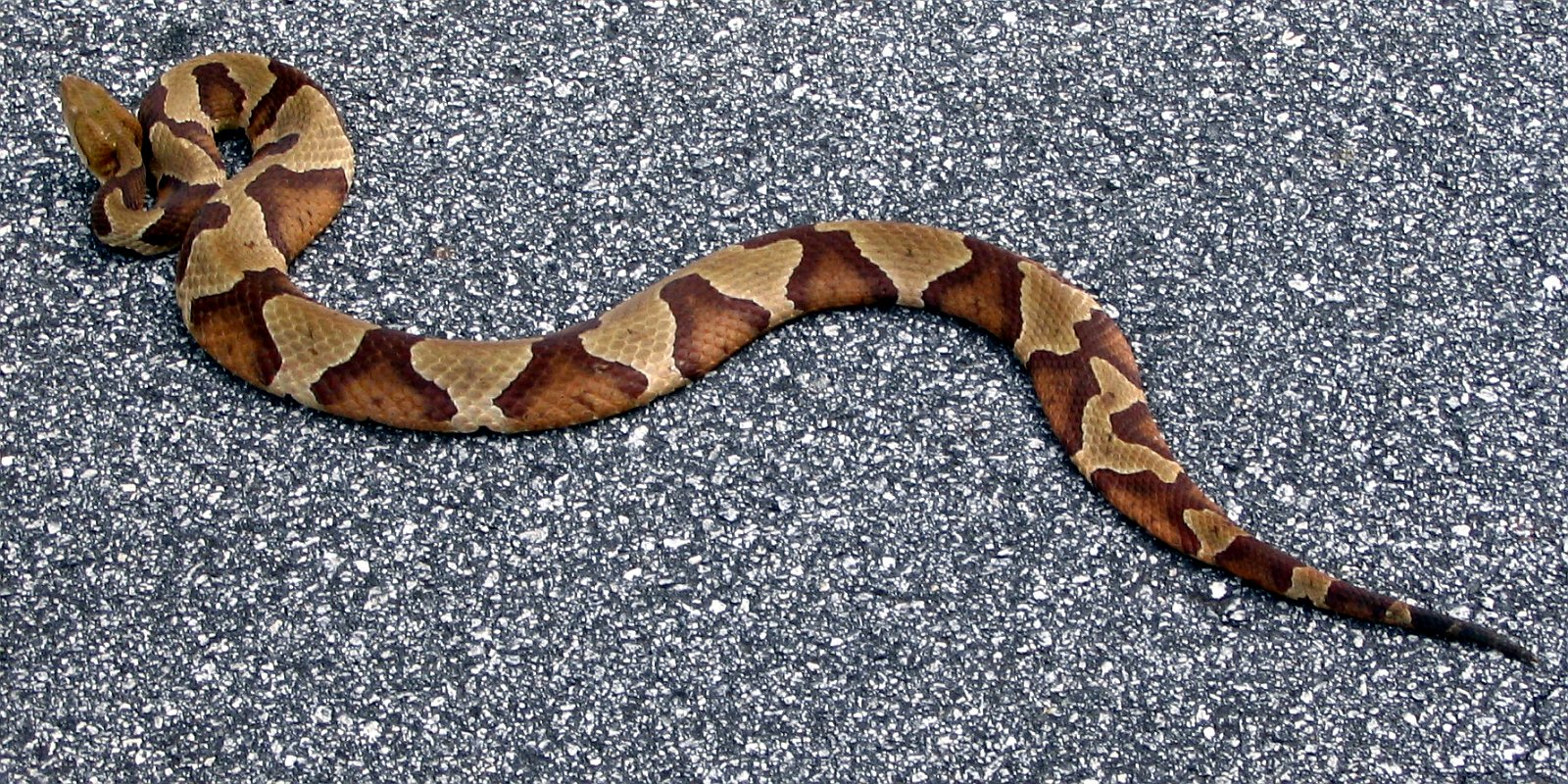
An American Copperhead (this picture taken particularly at the entrance to the camp)

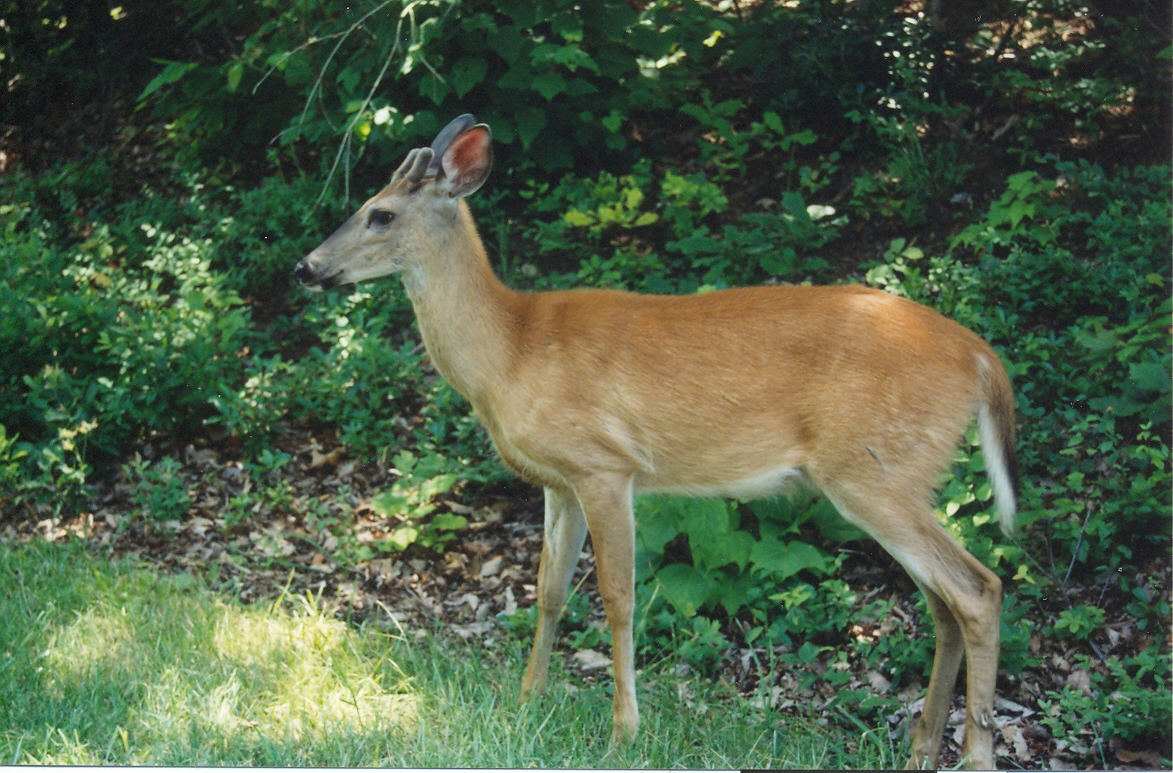
White Tailed Deer, similar to those found in and near the camp

The camp is a native home to many of the same animals that are native to both Central and North Georgia. In the case of land animals, this includes, but is not limited to: Black Bear, White Tailed Deer, and American Copperhead. Deer are particularly prevalent, and can be found once or twice in any given week. In addition, the lake, Lake Bulow Campbell is home to several species of freshwater fish. Fishing is allowed on a catch-and-release practice.

== Links ==
- "Bert Adams Scout Camp | Atlanta Area Council | 92". www.campbertadams.org.
