= Fort Daniel =

Fort in Georgia, built 1813

- Location within Metro Atlanta Location within Georgia Location within the United States
- 34.046920°N 83.933860°W
- Location: Gwinnett County, Georgia, United States

History
- Built: 1813

Site notes
- Discovered: 2007

Fort Daniel was a fort in Georgia, United States. Located on Hog Mountain in modern-day Gwinnett County, the fort was built in 1813, during the War of 1812, to protect settlers in the state's western regions from attacks. Archaeologists excavated its site in 2007.

== History ==
In 1798, Indian agent Benjamin Hawkins established a boundary line in north Georgia that marked the border for Cherokee hunting grounds. Multiple forts were erected along this "Hawkins Line" in order to protect white settlers of the region. One such fort existed at Hog Mountain, near the headwaters of the Apalachee River and at the southern point of this line. While little is known about this early station, by 1813, General Allen Daniel Jr. of the Georgia Militia ordered the fort at Hog Mountain to be rebuilt. Fort Daniel, presumably named in the general's honor, was constructed that year as part of defenses against attacks from Native American during the War of 1812. The same month that orders had been given to rebuild the fort at Hog Mountain, Lieutenant George Rockingham Gilmer (who would later serve as Governor of Georgia) was ordered to construct a fort at the confluence of Peachtree Creek and the Chattahoochee River in the Native American town of Standing Peachtree (the modern-day location of Buckhead). This fort, variously known as Fort Peachtree and Fort Gilmer, was connected to Fort Daniel via a road that today makes up a part of Peachtree Street, a major thoroughfare in modern Atlanta.

In 2002, a Georgia historical marker for the fort was erected along Georgia State Route 124 near Lawrenceville, Georgia. In 2007, the site of the fort was relocated by the Gwinnett Archaeological Research Society, who proceeded to excavate the site. By 2011, excavations had yielded numerous artifacts, such as ceramics and nails, as well as fort features such as the wall trench for a stockade and evidence of blockhouses.
