= Lake Bulow Campbell =

- Location within Georgia Location within the United States
- Location: 9.15 Miles (14.72 kilometers) South of Covington, Georgia
- Coordinates: 33°27′52″N 83°52′08″W
- Type: Reservoir
- Etymology: J. Bulow Campbell
- Part of: Bert Adams Scout Reservation
- Primary outflows: An unnamed tributary creek of the Yellow River
- Basin countries: United States
- Managing agency: Boy Scouts of America Atlanta Area Council
- Surface elevation: 584 ft (178 m)
- Islands: 2 (Both Unnamed)

Lake Bulow Campbell is an artificial reservoir, 9.1 miles south of Covington, Georgia, United States. The lake is the primary body of water for BSA Atlanta Area Council's Bert Adams Scout Reservation. The stoppage of the flow of water that creates the reservoir is created by Bert Adams Dam. The lake provides a space for swimming, kayaking, small boat sailing, and canoeing for those staying at the camp. The lake's surrounding woods also provide many hiking trails that are available to both campers and non-camper visitors. The lake is also home to several species of freshwater fish and aquatic fauna, and hosts a large amount of fishing on a catch-and-release basis.

== J. Bulow Campbell ==
J. Bulow Campbell (1870–1940) was a businessman, philanthropist, and an early supporter of the building of Bert Adams Scout Reservation. He is attributed as the namesake of Lake Bulow Campbell.

Campbell was born on December 15, 1870. He founded and headed the Campbell Coal Company, an Atlanta area based company that delivered both ice and coal. Campbell also served as a director of The Coca-Cola Company (similar to many of the early supporters of Boy Scouts in the Atlanta Area) and the Trust Company of Georgia. He also was a member of the Atlanta Rotary Club (also similarly to many early supporters of Boy Scouts in Atlanta). In the 1920s, he acted as a major advocate for the construction for a new permanent summer camp for Boy Scouts in the Atlanta Area Council. This advocation aided in the ultimate building of the Bert Adams Scout Reservation. For this advocation, and other work he completed in the early attempts to build the camp, in 1960, when the camp moved to its current location south of Covington, Georgia, the new reservoir lake that was constructed was named after Campbell.

== Recreation ==
Lake Bulow Campbell's primary use is that of recreation for campers and visitors to Bert Adams Scout Reservation. The lake is often used for swimming, sailing, canoeing, kayaking, and fishing, for campers and visitors. Trained members of the aquatics staff of the camp act as lifeguards for those using the lake for recreation.
