= Standing Peachtree =

Neighborhood of Atlanta, Georgia

Coordinates: 33°49′40″N 84°27′13″W

Standing Peachtree (Creek: Pvkanv-huere) was a Muscogee village and the closest Indian settlement to what is now the Buckhead area of Atlanta, Georgia. It was located where Peachtree Creek flows into the Chattahoochee River, in today's Paces neighborhood. It was located in the borderlands of the Cherokee and Muscogee nations. It is referred to in several documents dating as far back as 1782.

== Etymology ==
Standing Peachtree's name is an accurate preservation of its native Muscogee Indian name, Pakanahuili (Pvkanv-huere).

Some sources claim that "peachtree" is a corruption of "pitch tree", a supposed reference to pine trees from which pitch could be obtained. However, there is no evidence for the "pitch tree" name from before the 20th century, while "Standing Peachtree" can be traced back to the 18th century.

== Peachtree Street ==
Standing Peachtree was the end of the Muscogee Peachtree Trail, which ran from near Toccoa to just south of what is now Piedmont Hospital in Buckhead. (A marker now stands there at the corner of Peachtree St. and Palisades Rd.) At this junction the path split. One branch went to Standing Peachtree (Pace's Ferry and Moore's Mill roads were built along this path). The other branch ran southwards towards what is now Five Points in Downtown Atlanta. Thus, much of Atlanta's main street, Peachtree Street follows the earlier Indian path.

== Fort Peachtree ==
Fort Peachtree was built here in 1812. Later known as Fort Gilmer, it was connected to Fort Daniel at Hog Mountain in what is now Gwinnett County, by a path which came to be known as Old Peachtree Road. The Muskogee ceded the land that is now Metro Atlanta in 1821 as part of a series of coerced treaties that systematically removed tribal nations from Georgia. Standing Peachtree thus ceased its role as tribal trading post. It was established as the first post office in the newly established DeKalb County, preceding Decatur (the area would later become part of Fulton County). Montgomery's Ferry (later DeFoor's Ferry) across the river opened at Standing Peachtree in 1837 and the area soon became better known by that name. The post office closed in 1842.
