= January 2013 Southeastern United States floods =

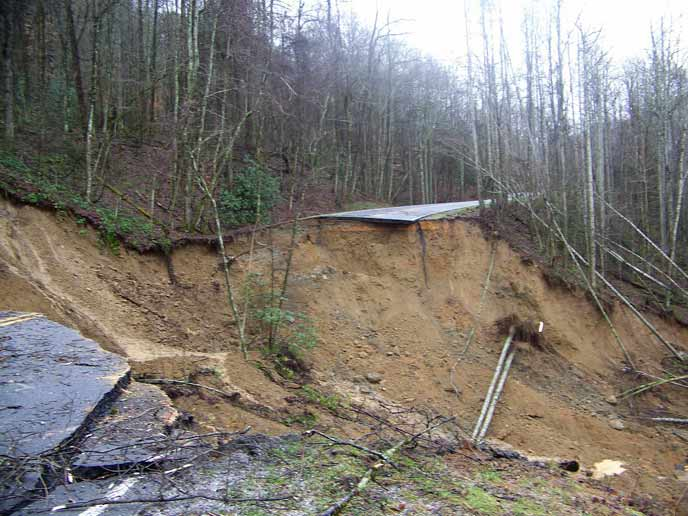
Newfound Gap Road landslide January 16, 2013

The January 2013 Southeastern United States floods occurred from January 14 to 17 and resulted in mudslides and washouts throughout the southern Appalachian Mountains region. At the height of the flooding, 50 roads were declared impassable in Greene County, Tennessee alone. A similar storm system brought more flooding rain to the region from January 27 to 31.

== Closure of U.S. Route 441 ==
As a result of the heavy rainfall, a January 16 landslide claimed a 200-feet section of U.S. Route 441 (known locally as "Newfound Gap Road") in Great Smoky Mountains National Park in North Carolina. The road, which crosses Newfound Gap at the Tennessee state line, was closed until April 15.

== See also ==
- 2009 Southeastern United States floods, which caused major rockslides in the southern Appalachians
- July 2013 Southeastern United States floods
