= July 2013 Southeastern United States floods =

2013 Southeastern United States floods
- Date: July 2–6, 2013
- Location: Florida Panhandle, Alabama, central Kentucky, Middle Tennessee, east and southeast Mississippi, North Georgia, Upstate South Carolina, western North Carolina
- Deaths: 1 (due to high winds)

The 2013 Southeastern United States floods were ongoing flooding across the southeastern U.S. Flash floods began on the morning of July 2 and continued through Independence Day and into the next day. The hardest-hit areas as of Friday afternoon are the Florida Panhandle, northwest Alabama and the area around Columbus, Mississippi. A plume of tropical moisture caused heavy rain to train over the same areas, for more than 36 hours in some cases, leading to flash flooding.

The system also caused sporadic damaging winds and one tornado in Destin, Florida.

== Beginnings ==
A dip in the jet stream over the Plains states brought a continuous flow of tropical air from the Gulf of Mexico and East Pacific into the southeastern United States. Meanwhile, a large ridge of high pressure over the Western United States combined with another in the North Atlantic Ocean to block the pattern on July 2. By the morning of July 3, heavy rains were falling over western Georgia and the Atlanta metropolitan area along with the Florida Panhandle. On July 4, the low pressure retrograded to southwest Missouri, allowing another band of heavy rain to develop over northwest Alabama and Middle Tennessee. The following day, heavy showers and rainbands developed across Alabama, eastern Mississippi and the Florida panhandle.

== Impacts ==
=== Georgia ===
Several inches of rain fell across north and west Georgia on July 3, leading to flash flooding and washing out roads in parts of the Atlanta metropolitan area. Water briefly covered the road at the intersection of Interstate 75 and 285. Creeks ran out of their banks in some areas of North Georgia, causing many roads to be shut down overnight.

=== Florida ===
Heavy rainfall in excess of 10 inches led to severe flash flooding over the Florida Panhandle. Homes were inundated and roads were washed out in Bay and Washington counties, including Panama City, and evacuations were required in some areas. Also, strong winds caused rip currents on the coast that caught several swimmers off guard, leading to dozens of water rescues along the Florida gulf coast. On July 5, a waterspout came ashore as a tornado in Destin, causing minimal damage.

=== Alabama ===
Minor street flooding was reported in the Birmingham area on the evening of July 3. Flash floods occurred across northwestern Alabama, including the Huntsville area, on July 4. Many roads throughout Huntsville and Madison were flooded and closed. Severe flooding was reported in Hartselle as well, where authorities closed a portion of State Route 36 and several side streets. Flash flooding and mudslides were reported in Winston County. In addition, heavy winds blew down trees in extreme southeastern Alabama on Thursday afternoon. Several towns across Alabama cancelled or postponed Independence Day festivities due to the rain and flooding.

On July 5, heavy rains once again formed over West Alabama. Street flooding was reported in Tuscaloosa. That evening, extremely heavy rainfall once again led to widespread flooding across northwest Alabama. Significant flash flooding affected Haleyville and covered sections of State Route 13 in the town with over one foot of water. Roads were also shut down due to floodwaters in Brilliant.

=== North Carolina ===
Floods were reported in the Asheville area on both July 3 and 4. Several roads were closed. Flash floods also occurred in the southwestern part of the state on July 4. Flash flooding struck Asheboro during the evening of July 5.

=== Mississippi ===
During the early morning hours of July 5, flash flooding closed roads and inundated homes in Wayne County in the far southeast portion of the state. Dozens of homes were evacuated due to rising waters. Heavy rains fell on the afternoon of July 5, producing floods that covered 40 streets and closed several county roads in and around Columbus.

=== South Carolina ===
Flash flooding prompted several road closures around Greenville on July 4. One person was killed in Gaffney due to high winds from flood-producing thunderstorms.

=== Kentucky ===
Heavy rains over central Kentucky caused flash flooding on July 4. During the afternoon and evening, rural roads were inundated with floodwaters.

Rains redeveloped on July 5, leading to flooding in downtown Campbellsville.

Heavy rains once again fell on July 6, causing severe flash flooding in the Frankfort area. Homes and businesses were inundated, and numerous roads were submerged. Later in the morning, flooding spread to the Cincinnati metropolitan area with many creeks and small rivers running out of their banks.

=== Tennessee ===
The heavy rain on July 5 caused street flooding in the Nashville metropolitan area. Minor flooding also affected Montgomery County in the late evening hours. Another flash flood event occurred in the Mount Juliet area (east of Nashville) in early August.

=== Virginia ===
Life-threatening flooding also occurred in Roanoke, Virginia on July 10 and 11.

== See also ==
- January 2013 Southeastern United States floods
- 2009 Southeastern United States floods
