= Skirmish at Pace's Ferry =

Military engagement in the American Civil War

Coordinates: 33°51′32.37″N 84°27′15.75″W

- Part of the American Civil War
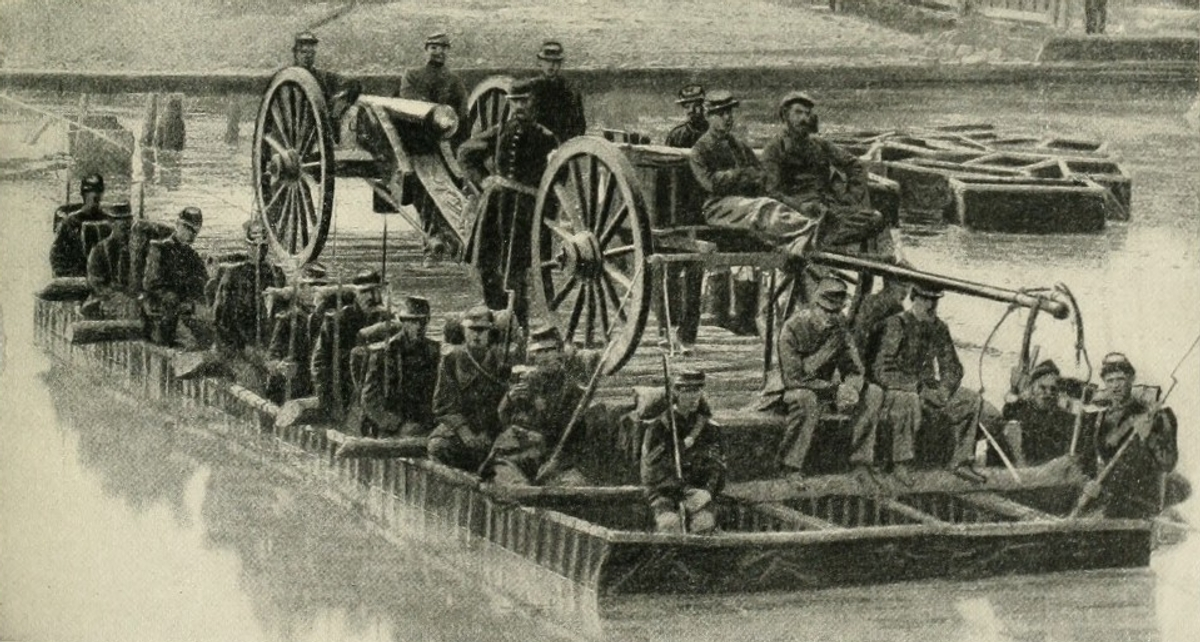
- Union artillery and infantry cross the Chattahoochee River in a canvas pontoon boat
| Date | July 5, 1864 |
| Location | Pace's Ferry, near Atlanta, Georgia |
| Result | Union victory |

Belligerents
| United States (Union) | CSA (Confederacy) |

Commanders and leaders
| Oliver O. Howard | |

The Skirmish at Pace's Ferry was an engagement fought on July 5, 1864, near Pace's Ferry, Atlanta, Georgia, during the Atlanta campaign of the American Civil War. Union troops of Maj. Gen. Oliver O. Howard seized a key pontoon bridge over the Chattahoochee River, enabling Federal troops to continue their offensive to capture the important rail and supply center of Atlanta.

Union Maj. Gen. William T. Sherman's army had steadily advanced towards Atlanta in the spring and summer of 1864, fighting a series of battles against the Confederate Army of Joseph E. Johnston. Sherman continually flanked the Confederate positions and slipped ever closer to his goal. Howard's IV Corps pursued the retreating Confederates along the Western & Atlantic Railroad, with General Thomas J. Wood's division in the lead. They encountered very little resistance until the head of column reached Vining's Station. From that point, a road led to the east toward Atlanta, crossing the Chattahoochee River at Pace's Ferry, where the Confederates had constructed a pontoon bridge over the deep and swift flowing river. Wood's skirmishers encountered a brigade of dismounted cavalry, which had its front covered by rail barricades along a ridge at right angles to the road, a quarter mile from the railroad station. Wood quickly drove the Confederates from these barricades and pushed on to the river. Despite Confederate efforts to destroy the bridge to prevent it from falling into enemy hands, Wood's men arrived in time to save the greater part of the bridge. Confederate attempts to burn the structure had failed, and mooring ropes had been cut on the Confederate side so that the pontoon bridge drifted in the river.

Not seeing a suitable opportunity to attack the strong Confederate positions across the Chattahoochee, Howard ordered his corps into camp on high ground facing the river and awaited the arrival of Federal pontoons. July 10, Stanley's and Wood's divisions moved to near the mouth of Sope Creek, in support of General John Schofield, who had crossed the river at that point (north of Pace's Ferry) and outflanked the Confederates. On July 11, at 5 p.m. Gen. Howard received "orders to secure the heights opposite Powers' Ferry, on the south side of the Chattahoochee, to protect the laying of a bridge at that point. Stanley's division fulfilled these instructions the next morning at daylight, passing the river at Schofield's bridge."
