= Hardy Pace =

American ferryman, miller, and settler

- Born: July 10, 1785; Anson County, North Carolina
- Died: December 5, 1864 (aged 79); Milledgeville, Georgia
- Occupations: Ferryman, miller
- Known for: Namesake of Pace's Ferry, Battle of Pace's Ferry, and Pace's Ferry Road in Atlanta

Hardy Pace (July 10, 1785 – December 5, 1864) was an American ferryman, miller, and early settler of Atlanta, Georgia. He is the namesake of Pace's Ferry, an important ferry in the 19th century; and all iterations of Paces Ferry Road in north Atlanta.

== Early life and ferry ==
Pace was born in 1785 in Anson County, North Carolina to Stephen Pace and Catherine Gatewood Buchanan. Hardy Pace is the Descendent of Richard Pace of Jamestown, Virginia. In 1809, he moved to north Georgia. The area he settled is known today as Vinings, Georgia, but at the time was known as (Pace's) Crossroads and, later, Paces (now a neighborhood of Buckhead). By the 1830s, Pace had established a ferry service on the Chattahoochee River which connected north Georgia and Chattanooga. His ferry business was highly successful, and Pace became a significant landowner in the Vinings area, accumulating 10,000 acres by some estimates. He also expanded into other businesses, including a gristmill (Pace's Mill), farm, and tavern, and owned more than 20 slaves. Pace married Lucy Kirksey (1786 – 1842) and they had five children: Karen, Parenthia, Catherine Gatewood, Solomon, and Bushrod.

== Civil War and the Pace House ==
On July 5, 1864, Pace's ferry was the site of a Civil War battle and Union victory. Following the battle, Union General William T. Sherman and his troops spent 11 days in the Vinings area preparing for the Battle of Atlanta. During this time, General Oliver O. Howard set up his headquarters in Pace's home. The home was once believed to have also served as a hospital for wounded soldiers following the Battle of Atlanta, but this theory is now disputed.

Union soldiers burned down Pace's home following their occupation. Only a set of granite stairs survived the fire. Pace's son, Solomon, rebuilt the home in the same location some time in the late 1860s or early 1870s, after returning to the Vinings area. The home still stands and is maintained by the Vinings Historic Preservation Society. Following renovations in the late 1990s, the home is now used for special events. In 2009, it was added to the National Register of Historic Places.

== Death and legacy ==
When Union troops occupied Pace's home, he and his family fled to Milledgeville, Georgia. Pace died several months later in December 1864. An unverified legend suggests that Pace died of wounds received while defending his home with a shotgun from Union soldiers. He is buried in the Pace family cemetery at the top of Mount Wilkinson, in Vinings.

Several streets in the Atlanta area are named for Hardy Pace, including Paces Ferry Road and Paces Mill Road. A bronze statue of Pace, sculpted by artist Hilarie Johnston, was erected in an office building on Paces Ferry Road in 1987.
