= Ready Georgia =

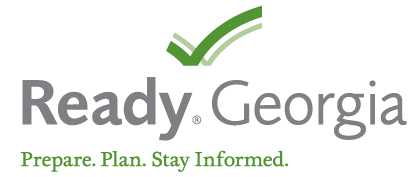
- Founded: January 2008
- Type: Public Awareness
- Purpose: Disaster Preparedness
- Location: Atlanta, Georgia
- Region served: The State of Georgia
- Owner: GEMA
- Key people: Charley English, Director of Homeland Security for GEMA
- Website: Ready Georgia

Ready Georgia is a statewide emergency preparedness campaign in the U.S. state of Georgia instituted by the Georgia Emergency Management Agency (GEMA) and Governor Sonny Perdue in conjunction with the national Ready America campaign sponsored by the Federal Emergency Management Agency (FEMA). Ready Georgia is supported by The Ad Council, local volunteer organizations, and corporate partnerships.

== Mission ==
Governor Sonny Perdue, GEMA/OHS director Charley English, Ready Kids mascot Rex the mountain lion, and Georgia elementary school students pose during Ready Georgia's official launch at the state capital building.

GEMA created the Ready Georgia campaign in response to survey data revealing that nearly 80 percent of Georgia residents had not taken even the most basic steps towards being prepared for the wide range of natural and man-made disasters that threaten the state. Ready Georgia intends to "promote a preparedness and prevention culture" in Georgia through public education and outreach. The campaign specifically encourages residents to be prepared so they can safely oversee their own evacuation and maintain self-sufficiency for a full three days after an emergency.

== Education and outreach ==
One of Ready Georgia's primary concerns is ensuring that individuals and households have an adequately stocked ready kit, which is essential in maintaining awareness and self-sufficiency in the wake of a disaster. Through a partnership with the Home Depot corporation, Ready Georgia has been able to put on statewide workshops that teach children about disaster preparedness. Utilizing its Web site, Ready Georgia has also been able to provide a tool that can assist users in calculating exactly how much food and water they will need for their own kits. Notable Georgians such as Atlanta Falcons fullback Ovie Mughelli, NASCAR Sprint Cup driver David Ragan, and former Atlanta Braves outfielder Jeff Francoeur participated by creating profiles on Ready Georgia's Web site letting Georgians know what is in their ready kits.

Georgia's 5th graders were able to enter a Ready Georgia art and essay contest, for which they were asked to submit work demonstrating how they are their families would prepare for a variety of disasters. The winners received their own ready kits from Home Depot, as well as personal and school recognition on Ready Georgia's Web site.

In 2009, Ready Georgia was able to provide Georgia residents with 200 NOAA weather radio receivers at no cost and many more at a reduced price, in an effort to acknowledge and address the fact that economically disadvantaged citizens face greater challenges in the face of a disaster and are often unprepared.

Ready Georgia has additionally sought to address the economic impact of disasters through the development of materials stressing the importance of proper business continuity planning to Georgia-based businesses. This is especially critical in the Atlanta metro area, which is home to the fourth most Fortune 500 company headquarters among all cities in America.

== Emergencies addressed since inception ==
In September 2009, Georgia experienced significant flooding, resulting in a state of emergency being declared for 17 counties. Awareness and preparation are critical elements of an effective response to flooding, which often necessitates evacuation and cuts off access to supplies of food and clean water. The importance of flood insurance in mitigating the social and economic damage caused by flooding is another awareness and preparedness issue for anyone facing the prospect of flooding; Ready Georgia has sought to address all of these issues.

H1N1 influenza, known commonly as "swine flu", has been a health issue of public concern since early 2009, and was declared a pandemic by the World Health Organization. The Georgia Department of Community Health Division of Public Health and the Georgia Emergency Management Agency have used the Ready Georgia campaign to disseminate preparedness information to Georgians.
