= Georgia Township Act =

The Georgia Township Act is a bill introduced in January 2007 in the Georgia General Assembly, which would for the first time create "townships" in the US state of Georgia.

== Overview ==
It would give unincorporated areas of at least 500 acres (approximately two square kilometers or 0.8 square miles) the power to regulate zoning and other land use, and to levy a maximum annual property tax of a half-mill (0.5‰), managed by a board of supervisors selected in nonpartisan elections in odd-numbered years. All other services and laws would remain the responsibility of the county.

The bill would also require a population density of 200 persons per square mile (77 persons/km^{2}), or one person per 3.2 acres), and that at least 10% of the included area be zoned or used for non-residential purposes. It would also allow for the contracting of public utilities and public services, though the bill which passed the state senate added the exception of cable TV. Local legislation would be required to create a township or convert it to a municipality. A referendum would also be required, as well for the township to be annexed by a municipality. Deannexation by a township could be done by a vote of the board of supervisors if a landowner makes such a request, but it may not bring the township below the minimum requirements. Annexation may not be done solely down the length of a right of way, such as to make an annexation contiguous.

An additional requirement added to the final senate bill requires the township to notify the county of any requests for rezoning or new subdivisions, or proposed changes in the land use plan or regulations and ordinances. The county has ten business days to respond with its opinions and concerns and any proposed solutions, which must be made part of the township's public record and must be considered by the board prior to making a final decision. The township's final decision must then be forwarded back to the county. This procedure also applies to adjoining municipalities and townships, but not to other counties. It also applies in reciprocal, with adjoining cities or the county notifying the township of changes which might affect it. A township may be in more than one county. Counties may create special service districts at the request of a township.

While the bill explicitly states that a "township" would not be a municipality, the definitions set forth in the law make it nearly identical in function to villages or hamlets in some other states, including neighboring North Carolina and Florida, where they are the lowest level of a three-tiered system of municipalities. One major factor in this comparison is that, unlike most minor civil divisions, the proposed areas would be very small in size, and together would not cover the entire or even a large part of a county. The other major factor is that, like any municipality, they would not be subject to involuntary annexation by nearby cities (which for several decades have been the only type of municipality allowed under the Georgia State Constitution). The township designation may therefore be in order to avoid a broader and hence more complicated and politically charged overhaul of local government classifications in the state.

=== Basis ===
The idea grew from dissatisfaction in several places with county governments, which have often allowed excessive or disorganized land development. While larger unincorporated communities like Dunwoody are still pressing for cityhood, others such as Vinings and Tucker (all in metro Atlanta) and St. Simons Island would have another option under the bill, which is intended as a compromise for those who want more local control, but not the significantly higher taxes incurred by having to provide state-required city services.

== Legislative history ==
The Georgia Senate bill (SB 89), also has an accompanying resolution (SR 130) which would provide for the constitutional amendment necessary to allow for such a change. If passed in a November 2008 referendum, it would have been effective on the first day of 2009. The bill was introduced by David Adelman of Decatur, and was also sponsored by senators Chip Pearson, Dan Weber, Tim Golden, Doug Stoner, and J. Powell of the 42nd, 51st, 40th, 8th, 6th, and 23rd districts, respectively.

The senate passed the bill, 43–10, on March 27, the 30th and last business day ("crossover day") of the current session for bills to pass at least one house and cross over to the other for consideration that year. The passed bill creates a new chapter 93 under title 36 of the OCGA. Another bill (HB 651) would have made several changes, including allowing county superior courts to approve townships, but did not pass. That bill would have amended chapter 31 (also under title 36) instead.

Ultimately, the original bill (along with one to incorporate Dunwoody) failed to gain passage before the end of the session, but was likely to be reintroduced in 2008. Also considered in the 2007 Georgia General Assembly were bills to allow counties to object to the annexation of cities, though it is unclear whether this would apply to annexations by the proposed townships. Currently, a county may only object to the first annexation of its area by a city which is only in an adjacent county. There is no formal process for blocking an annexation however.
