= Arnold Mill, Georgia =

Unincorporated community in Georgia, U.S.

Coordinates: 34.1175977°N 84.3879820°W

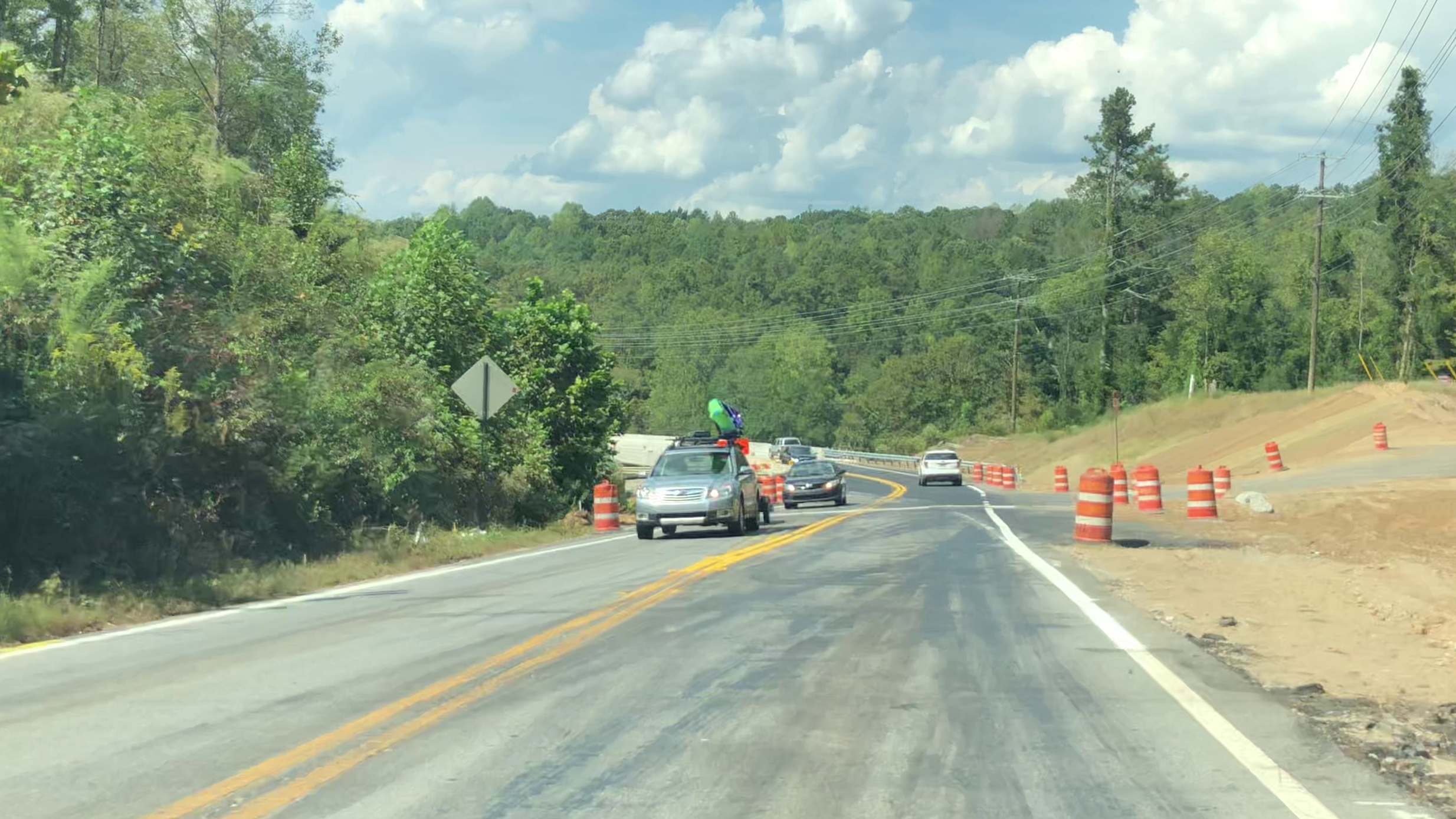
Georgia State Route 140 in Arnold Mill

Arnold Mill is an unincorporated community in Fulton County, in the U.S. state of Georgia. It is included in article about Historic mills of the Atlanta area.

== History ==
A variant name is "Arnold". A post office called Arnold was established in 1883, and remained in operation until 1903. The community was named after Givens White Arnold, a pioneer citizen.
