= Decatur Waterworks =

- U.S. National Register of Historic Places
- U.S. Historic district
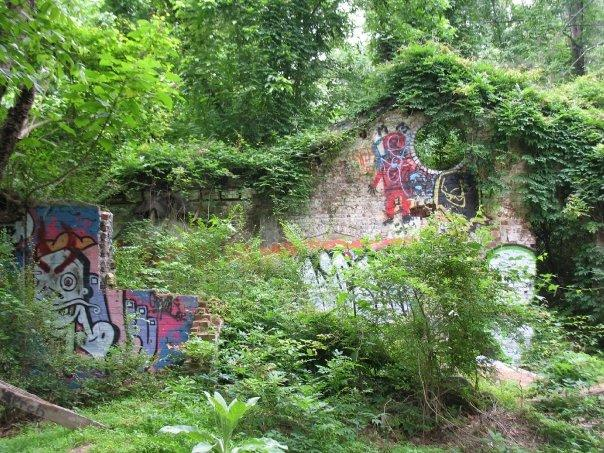
- Part of the Decatur Water Works

- Location within Atlanta Location within Georgia Location within the United States
- Location: 1400 McConnell Dr., Mason Mill Park, Decatur, Georgia
- Coordinates: 33°48′28″N 84°18′8″W
- Area: 42 acres (17 ha)
- Built: 1906
- NRHP reference No.: 06000123
- Added to NRHP: March 15, 2006

The Decatur Waterworks was a facility that obtained drinking water for the city of Decatur, Georgia, from the local Peachtree Creek and Burnt Fork Creek. Completed in 1907 and abandoned since the 1940s, the Waterworks have fallen into disrepair and are covered with graffiti. The Decatur Waterworks are in Mason Mill Park, near the city of Decatur.

== Historical designation ==
On March 15, 2006, the Decatur Waterworks was added to the National Register of Historic Places, due to its former industrial significance as a water works, its political importance as Works Progress Administration (WPA) project, and its use as a public park.

== History of the Decatur Water Works ==
Near Decatur Georgia, before the Civil War, in the 1850s, Ezekiel Mason built a flour mill on the bank of Burnt Fork Creek near where it flows into the south fork of Peachtree Creek. This is the mill from which Mason Mill Road and Mason Mill Park derive their names. After the deaths of Mr. Mason and his wife in the late 19th century the land was transferred to J. A. Mason, relationship unknown. The provenance of the property becomes unclear at that point as the DeKalb Historical Society notes show that the J. A. Mason sold the property to the City of Decatur, but Decatur City Council Minutes refer to the property as the "Tallery property", and an option was exercised with C. H. Talley for the purchase of land in October 1906. In any case, records show that a waterworks construction project was completed on the property by December 1907.

By 1939, the Decatur Water Works consisted of two aeration and solid removal tanks, two storage tanks, an office building and two dams, one dam on South Peachtree Creek and one on Burnt Fork Creek. The remains of all of these structures can still be seen today and are often referred as ‘the old Decatur Water Works’.

The Decatur Water Works supplied water to the city until the 1940s. Its use as a public park began in the 1930s when a Works Progress Administration (WPA) project built a number of recreational amenities on the site. These amenities included granite benches, cooking grills, tables and a stone bridge over Burnt Fork Creek. These things also can be seen today. The stone bridge is part of the new trail that has been recently constructed in the park. The WPA also built a stacked stone fountain that remains and can be seen very near the stone bridge.

By 1941 it was apparent the 1.8 million US gallons (6,800 m^{3}) of water per day produced by the water works was no longer enough to satisfy the growing needs of Decatur. The property was leased to DeKalb County, which operated the water works and sold the water to Decatur. DeKalb used revenue from the facility to fund a county-wide treatment plant in the Dunwoody area that uses water from the Chattahoochee River. Initially called the Laurel Plant, it is now called the Scott Candler Plant after the county commissioner who led the development process.

During World War II the Decatur Water Works was used as the exclusive water supply for the Naval Air Station that is now Peachtree DeKalb Airport and an Army Hospital in the area. The property was declared off limits for civilian use and was not used for any recreational purpose or as a civilian water supply during the war. At the end of the war the water works land was returned to the City of Decatur and continued to be operated and maintained by the county as a backup for the new water system. The park area was not maintained and was not used by the public.

For a time the office building at the water works was used for storage by the county. In 1951 a bond issue to finance development of the land was voted down. The water works fell into disuse and disrepair. By the mid-1960s the lakes had begun to fill with silt and there were complaints of flooding from local residents who lived in the adjacent neighborhoods that were built in the 1950s and 1960s. In about 1965 the dams were dynamited and the reservoirs drained.

== Present day ==
In 1988 the county worked with local resident groups to make a development plan for Mason Mill Park that included the water works land, but the plan was never funded. In 2006 the Decatur Water Works was declared a historic site. A second plan was developed in 2008 and, with partial funding from the PATH Foundation, is being implemented.
