= Nancy Creek (Atlanta) =

Stream in Georgia, United States

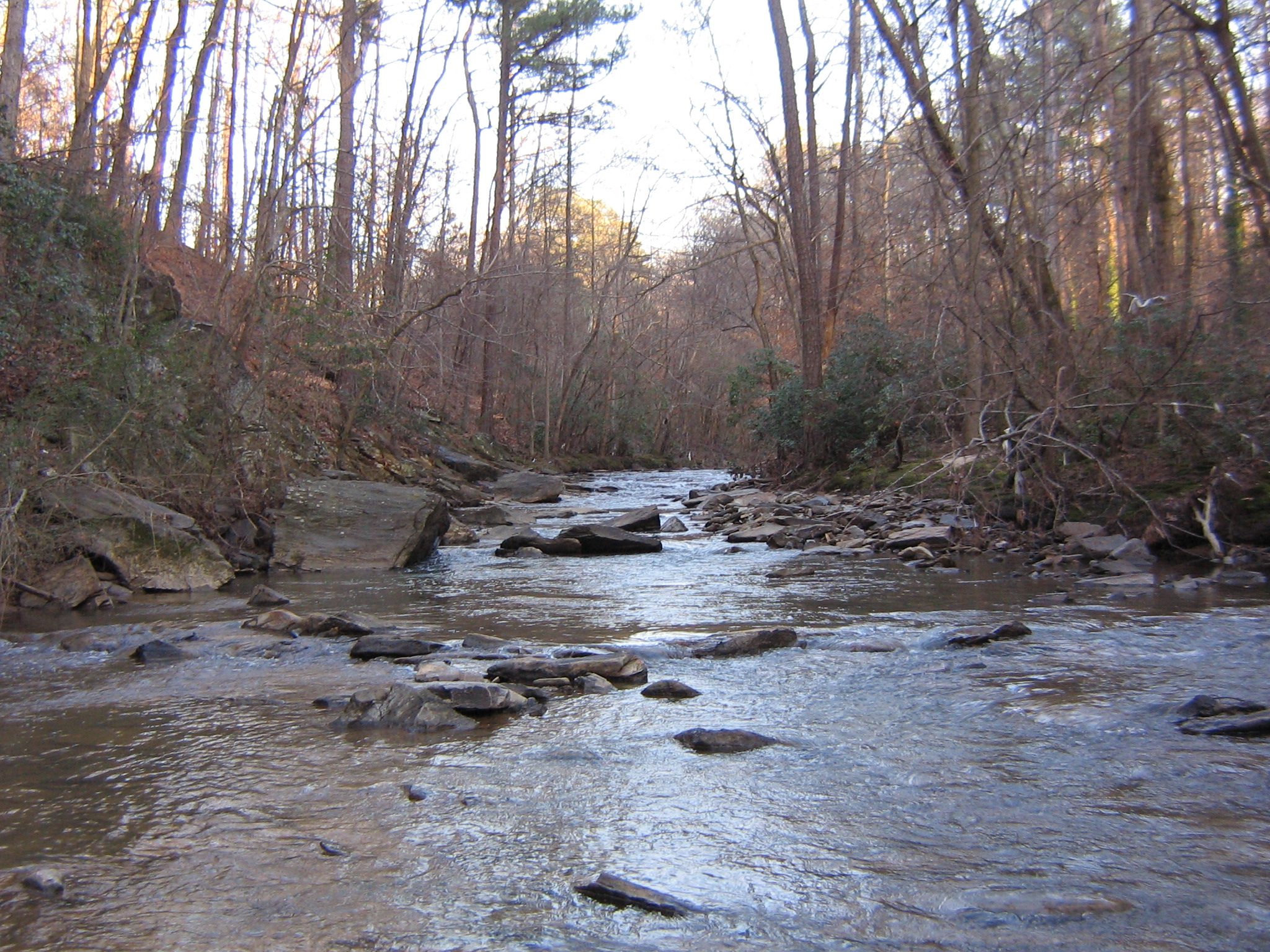
Nancy Creek by Murphey Candler Park

Nancy Creek is a 16.3-mile-long (26.2 km) stream in northern Atlanta, Georgia, United States. It begins in far northern DeKalb County, just north of Chamblee, and flows southwestward into Fulton County, through the far southeast corner of Sandy Springs, then through the Buckhead area of Atlanta. It empties into Peachtree Creek, which then flows into the Chattahoochee River, south of Vinings and Paces. The Chattahoochee eventually joins with the Flint River to create the Apalachicola River, which flows into the Gulf of Mexico. The North Fork Nancy Creek is a major tributary, while Little Nancy Creek tends to run low or dry. Other tributaries include Bubbling Creek which originates in Chamblee, Perimeter Creek which originates in Dunwoody and Silver Creek which includes the 38-acre Silver Lake and Little Silver Lake.

Since 1994, Nancy Creek has had a USGS stream gauge in the Paces neighborhood of Atlanta at West Wesley Road (NANG1, 33°50′18″N 84°26′22″W), with NWS flood stage being 12.0 feet (3.7 m) at that point. The drainage basin above it is 37.7 square miles (98 km^{2}). Since 2003, there is another gauge further upstream in Buckhead at Rickenbacker Drive (NCKG1, 33°52′09″N 84°22′44″W). The basin at that point is 26.6 square miles (69 km^{2}), above an elevation of 810 feet (250 m), with a flood stage of 11.0 feet (3.4 m). Records of manual observations actually go back to 1961 at both sites (which are considered to be "at Atlanta"), but the latter gauge (often called "at Buckhead" to avoid ambiguity) appears to be the officially-used one.

== Flooding ==
Especially due to excessive urbanization, Nancy Creek often floods. Prior to September 2009, the most recent was in July 2005, with it reaching 12.9 feet (3.9 m) after the outer rain bands of Hurricane Dennis passed by. This was just after Hurricane Cindy caused it to flood as well, though neither event was considered major.

Hurricane Ivan and Hurricane Frances caused record-high floods less than a year earlier in September 2004. Those massive rains caused a sewer pipe to collapse into the creek due to major erosion, spilling sewage into the creek. The creek reached 15.26 feet (4.65 m) late on September 16, its second-highest ever. While this only lasted a few hours, several residents had to be rescued and evacuated by boat.

Some of the worst flooding ever recorded on Nancy Creek occurred in September 2009 as a result of the 2009 Atlanta floods. It severely damaged the bridge at Peachtree Dunwoody Road, washing out the main center support beam. The bridge was closed for six months until an entirely new two-lane replacement bridge reopened on March 23, 2010. The Emergency Repair Program of the Federal Highway Administration funded 100% of the $1 million cost.

On the evening of September 21, the creek reached 14.69 feet (4.48 m) at Rickenbacker Drive, where it began to overflow the bridge. This falls in fourth place, behind the 1973 record of 15.50 feet (4.72 m) set on December 1. It also reached 18.70 feet (5.70 m) at West Wesley Road, in second place behind the 2004 flood, when it reached 21.34 feet (6.50 m) on September 17.

== Fish life ==
=== Sport fish ===
- Largemouth Bass
  - Micropterus salmoides
- Spotted Bass
  - Micropterus punctulatus
- Bluegill
  - Lepomis macrochirus
- Redbreast Sunfish
  - Lepomis auritus
- Green Sunfish
  - Lepomis cyanellus
- Snail Bullhead
  - Ameiurus brunneus
- Warmouth
  - Lepomis gulosus
- Shadow bass
  - Ambloplites ariommus

=== Other fish ===
- Creek Chub
- Red Shiner
- Silverjaw Shiner
- White Sucker
- Alabama Hog Sucker
- Mosquitofish

== Fishing ==
The best times of day and year for fishing in these areas are late spring to mid-fall in the afternoon to evening. During the winter, the fish of Nancy Creek are significantly less active due to the great drop in temperature of the water. Popular techniques for fishing in Nancy Creek include fly fishing, as well as fishing with a spinning outfit.

== Toponymy ==
The origin of the name "Nancy Creek" is unclear. The name most likely honors a Native American Indian woman named Nancy.

Atlanta Constitution Wednesday January 31, 1883. "The widow of John L. Evans, late of this county, is living stout and hearty. She is now 85 years old. She is the mother of 11 children, 57 grandchildren and 93 great grandchildren. Her maiden name was Nancy Baugh. She was a sister of the late William Baugh of Gwinnett County and came to what later became Fulton County in 1818, and settled with her husband on Nancy Creek in this county when the Indians were here. This creek was named for her. Mrs. Evins, the mother of J.C. Evins of this city, is still living at the old homestead settled 65 years ago. Who can beat that for an old inhabitant." *Nancy Evans died November 1883 and is buried in an unmarked grave in the cemetery of the church bearing her name. *Garrett's Necrology
