= Akers Mill =

Flour mills in Georgia, United States

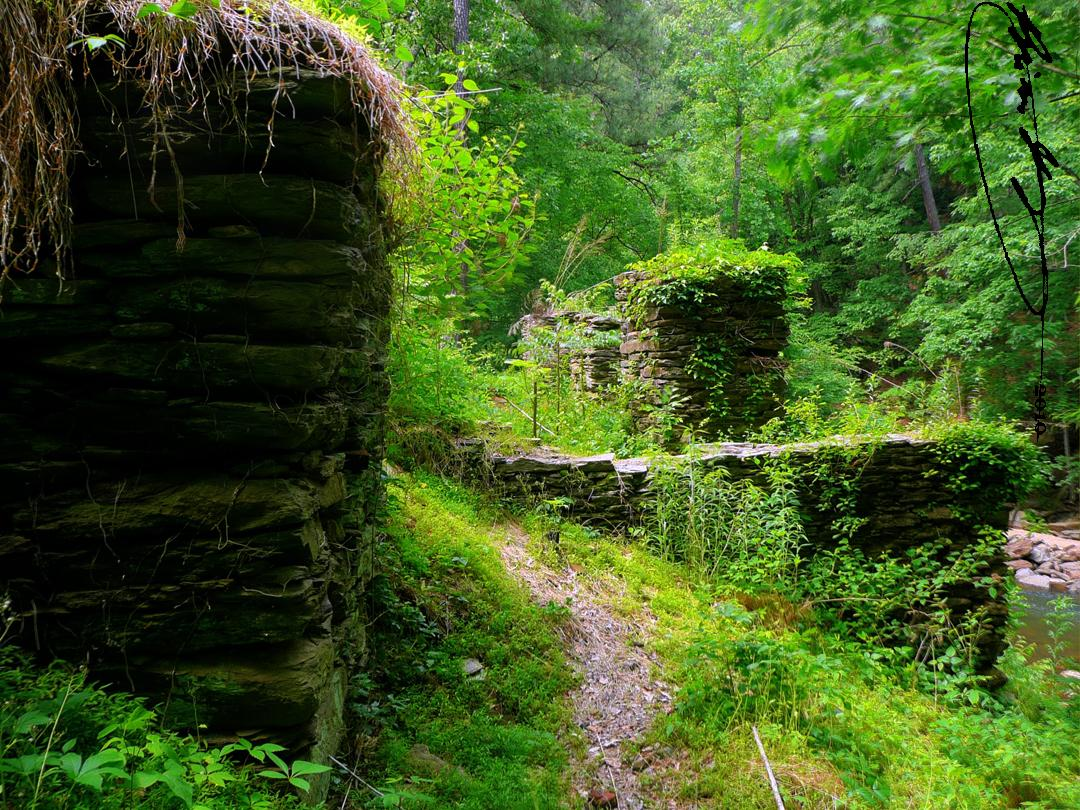
- Ruined foundation flagstones of Akers Mill
- Interactive map of Akers Mill
- Location: Cobb County, Georgia, United States
- Nearest city: Smyrna, Georgia
- Elevation: 813 ft (248 m)

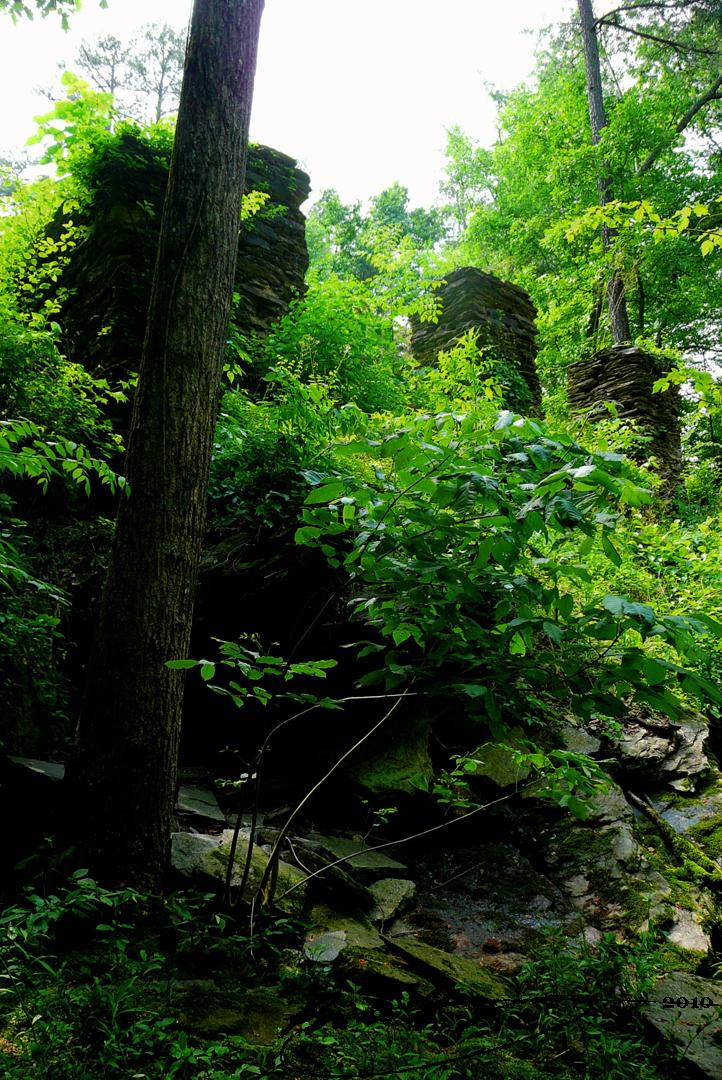
Ruins of Akers Mill in Spring 2010

Akers Mill was a complex of at least two 19th-century mills along Rottenwood Creek in Cobb County, Georgia, United States. The gristmill built into the bank overlooking the creek, with six terraces each acting as an individual floor in the mill operation. The mills developed shortly before the Civil War, were sold to the Akers family in 1873 and in turn were utilized for the production of flour and meal for their Atlanta area grocery stores. The Akers Brothers cut out and graded new roads to the mill and also farmed the nearby land. Additionally, they employed about 60 people and constructed housing in a small village south of the mills.

== Production ==
The gristmill's location on the banks of the creek allowed it to take advantage of its natural water power. Rottenwood Creek's flow reached 720 cfm (cubic feet per minute) during that time. On March 25, 1880, an article in the Marietta Journal reported, Akers Mill had installed a new process of milling that increased from 39 pounds (18 kg) to 43 pounds (20 kg) the amount of flour extracted from a bushel of wheat. Additionally, they were able to provide a finer grade of flour for consumption. The flour mill was capable of producing 200 barrels (196 pounds (89 kg) each) of flour daily, while the corn mill could produce 1,500 bushels of cornmeal in the same period. The flour mill was powered by a 36-inch (91 cm) turbine, supplemented by an 80-horsepower engine in the event water was scarce. Also, the 1880 U.S. Census records indicate the first mill's turbine was under a 23-foot (7.0 m) head and the second mill's was below a 26-foot (7.9 m) head.

== Present ==
Akers Mill underwent bankruptcy in 1879. The mill closed in 1889 with "liabilities of $100,000 and assets about the same." As the Atlanta area grew, the forgotten gristmill became derelict; and on August 15, 1978, its remnants were protected by the U.S. National Park Service, as part of the Chattahoochee River National Recreation Area.

In early 1990s, an archaeological survey investigation was done on the area as part of the Kennedy Parkway Project. The intact terraces and deposits allowed the archaeological study to address the internal technological structure of the mill, a historical dimension rarely recovered archeologically, since technological equipment was normally removed from mill buildings prior to their demolition or collapse. A limited recovery was done on an area of the site that could not be saved; however it seemed to be part of a domestic situation, rather than for primary industrial use. Currently, the terraces and the old flagstone foundations remain standing near the Rottenwood Creek Multi-Use Trail on the waterway.

The modern suburban edge city of Cumberland has developed nearby, and Akers Mill Road remains its namesake but now intersects with Cumberland Boulevard on the hill above, to the northwest.

The ruins are located at GPS coordinates 33°53′11.09″N 84°27′12.12″W.
