= Northside Drive =

Road in Atlanta, Georgia, United States

Northside Drive is a road in Atlanta which begins on Whitehall Street in Castleberry Hill just north of Interstate 20 (I-20), and ends by abruptly turning right near the Chattahoochee River in Sandy Springs near Riverwood High School, at which point it becomes Heards Ferry Road. Parts of the road are designated as US 19/US 29/US 41/SR 3.

== Route description ==
Its southern endpoint is located just east of Morehouse College, then travels north from there, passing by Mercedes-Benz Stadium. Next, it passes by the west side of Georgia Tech, followed by the Atlanta IKEA. After crossing I-75 at an interchange which was the site of the Bluffton University bus accident in 2007. This interchange has also been the site of many other accidents. Northside Drive then passes North Atlanta High School's current location (as opposed to its new location, which is on Northside Parkway), before splitting between US 41/SR 3 (Northside Parkway) to the west and Northside Drive to the east. It then crosses West Pace's Ferry Road. After this intersection, Blackland Road splits off from the east, and the road then intersects with Mount Paran Road; near this intersection is Holy Spirit Preparatory School. At I-285, Northside Drive forms an unusual interchange, with the road splitting off to the right to form New Northside Drive, a one-way street. New Northside Drive then joins back together with Northside Drive at a four-way intersection with Riveredge Lane, just before it ends by a sharp right turn to avoid the Chattahoochee River.

== Redevelopment ==
In 2013, it was announced that $2 billion would be spent on rejuvenating a 5-mile-long (8.0 km) section of Northside Drive south of I-75, much of which will go to the new Falcons stadium.

== See also ==
- Transportation in Atlanta
