= Rottenwood Creek =

Stream in Cobb County, Georgia, U.S.

Coordinates: 33°52′35″N 84°26′53″W

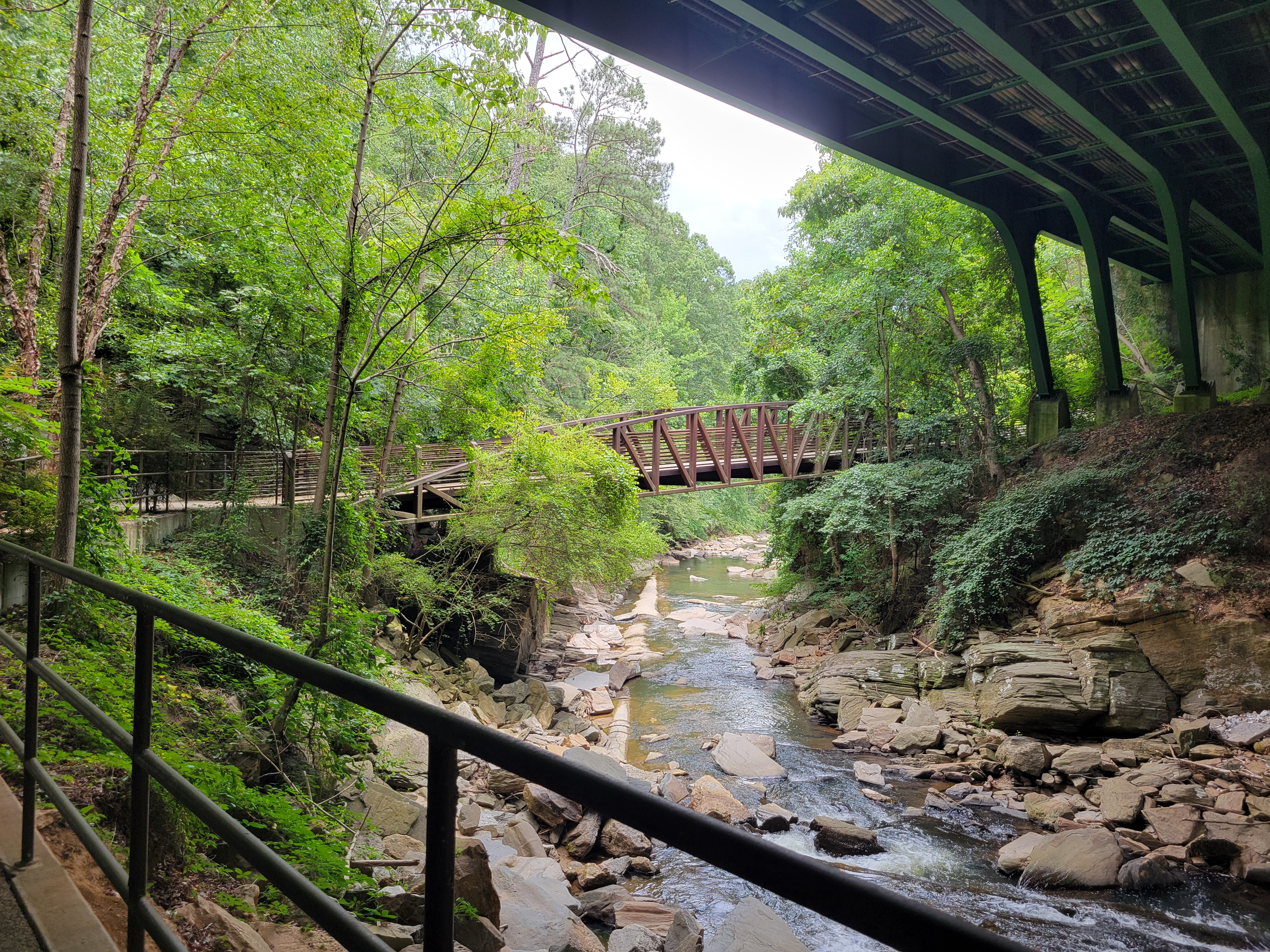
Rottenwood Creek Trail bridge over Rottenwood Creek

Rottenwood Creek (also spelled "Rotten Wood Creek") is a stream in Cobb County in the U.S. state of Georgia. It is a tributary to the Chattahoochee River.

Rottenwood Creek was named for Rotten Wood, a local Cherokee Native American.
