= Peachtree Creek =

Stream in Georgia, US

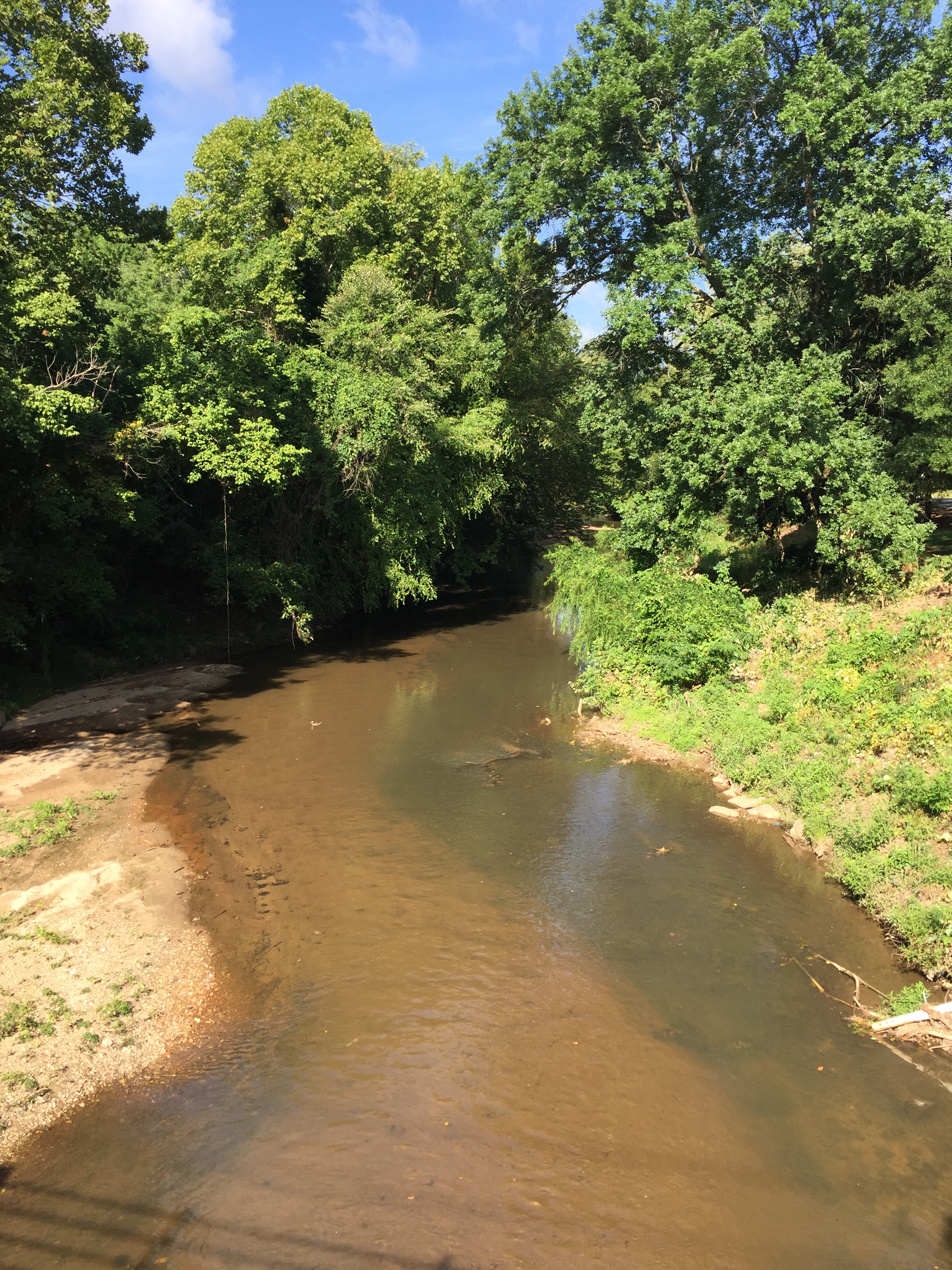
Peachtree Creek in 2016

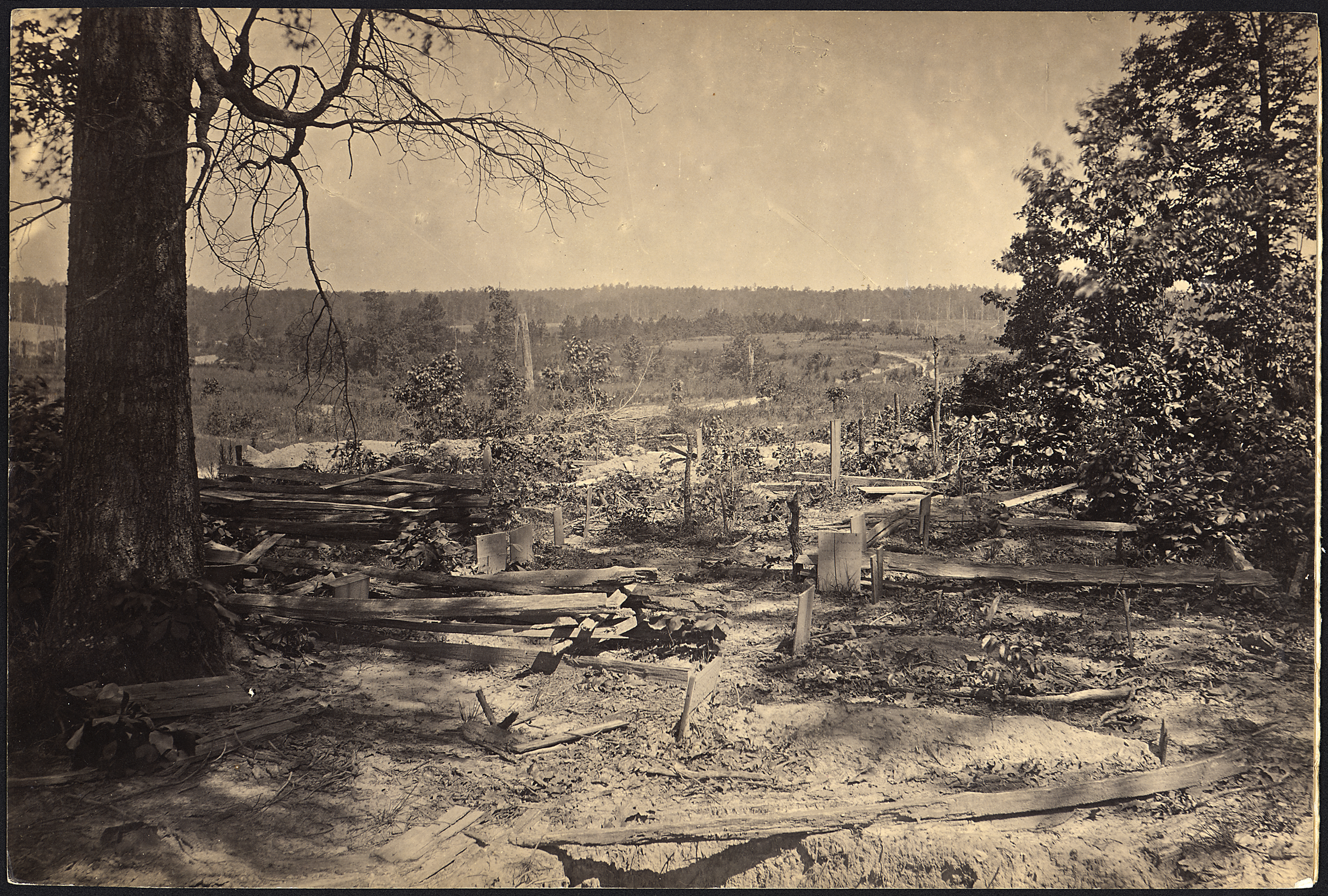
As a battlefield

Peachtree Creek is a major stream in Atlanta. It flows for 7.5 miles (12.1 km) almost due west into the Chattahoochee River just south of Vinings.

Peachtree Creek is an important part of the area history. Fort Peachtree was built near the creek and the Chattahoochee River to guard against the Cherokee, who were in the Cherokee County territory northwest of the river.

Depiction of the Battle of Peachtree Creek by Adolph Metzner

During the American Civil War, the Battle of Peachtree Creek was a major battle of the Atlanta campaign. Pace's Ferry was built across the river near the creek, and Paces Ferry Road still runs roughly parallel to the creek. Another street, Peachtree Battle Avenue, runs in a similar fashion. Because it is usually called just Peachtree Battle (even by GDOT on its overpass of Interstate 75), that part of Buckhead is often called the same, which in turn gave rise to a local play called Peachtree Battle.

Its two major tributaries are the North Fork Peachtree Creek and the South Fork Peachtree Creek. The northern fork begins at the edge of Gwinnett County and flows 13.5 miles (21.7 km) southwest, almost perfectly parallel to Interstate 85 through DeKalb County. It ends at its confluence with the southern fork, next to where the highway meets Georgia 400. The southern fork, 15.4 miles (24.8 km) long, begins in Tucker and flows south then west, passing through Clarkston, then crossing under part of the Stone Mountain Freeway and quickly back again, west (inside) of the Perimeter. It then flows twice through the northern part of the campus of Emory University and its Wesley Woods section. The southern edge of its basin borders the Eastern Continental Divide, including Peavine Creek (which ends next to WAGA-TV) and its tributary Lullwater Creek, which originates in the Lake Claire neighborhood of Atlanta and drains Fernbank Forest and the Druid Hills Golf Club north of Ponce de Leon Avenue. Other major nearby creeks in Atlanta include Nancy Creek (which flows into Peachtree Creek just before the Chattahoochee River), and Proctor Creek (which flows directly into the Chattahoochee).

== Streamflow and flooding ==
Since 1912, the stream gauge on Peachtree Creek (AANG1) has been located where it crosses Northside Drive just east of Interstate 75, just northwest of the Brookwood Split (where Interstate 85 leaves 75). It is located at 33°49′10″N 84°24′28″W, at 764 feet (233 m) above mean sea level. A 1-inch (25 mm) rainfall puts approximately 1.5 billion gallons or almost 6 billion liters into the watershed, by USGS calculations. That watershed (above the gauge only) is 86.8 square miles (225 km^{2}). There is also water quality monitoring equipment there, all transmitted to GOES weather satellites and back down to the USGS in real time. Prior to this current system, daily flow and water quality sampling were done as far back as 1958 and 1959, respectively. Records for this site are maintained by the USGS Georgia Water Science Center.

Flood stage is 17.0 feet (5.2 m) depth, and due to the heavy urbanization in the area, it often reaches above this mark during heavy storms. Peachtree Creek suffered massive flooding after Hurricane Frances and Hurricane Ivan in September 2004. Late on September 16, 2004, it reached a stage of 22.63 feet (6.90 m), a flow of 14,200 cubic feet (106,223 gallons) or 402 cubic meters (402,100 liters) per second, and a width of 450 feet (140 m), its highest official flood record ever, which actually washed away its gauge. The creek was about ten times its normal width, three times its normal speed, and 300 times its normal flow.

The worst flood ever occurred in 1919, when on January 29 (1/29) or December 9 (12/9) it reached a flow of about 21,000 cubic feet (160,000 gallons) or 600 cubic meters (600,000 liters) per second, and a stage of 25.80 feet (7.86 m).

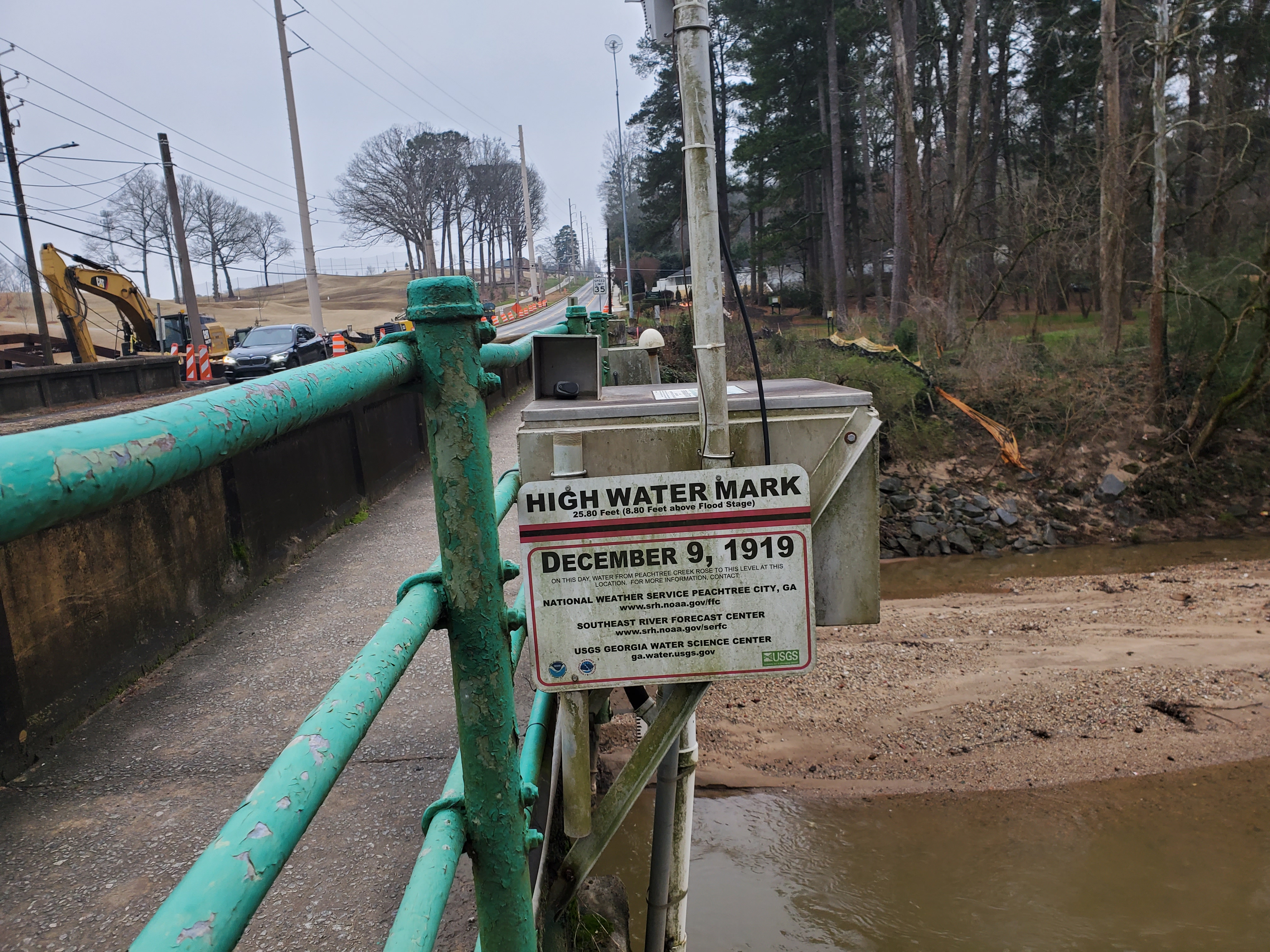
Peachtree Creek flood level from 1919

Another flood occurred in 1912 just above the 2004 event, and another in 1915 just below it. (Prior to the 1940s, there are no records for depth.) Base flow for the stream is about 67 cubic feet (1.9 m^{3}) per second, and a depth of about 3 feet (0.9 m).

The 2009 Atlanta floods set new records for most streams in the area, and Peachtree Creek at Northside Drive came a close second place, reaching a height of 23.89 feet (7.28 m) on September 21, 2009, at 9:15 pm, and causing water to flow over the bridge. The North Fork reached a record of 18.07 feet (5.51 m) at 7:15pm, topping the previous record of 17.70 feet (5.39 m) in September 2004. The South Fork reached its third-highest ever at 15.21 feet (4.64 m) 5:45pm, the record being a flood that brought it to 16.35 feet (4.98 m) on March 16, 1976.

The other stream gauges are SPJG1 on the South Fork "near Atlanta" at Johnson Road since April 2003, and NPBG1 also "near Atlanta" on the North Fork at Buford Highway since May 2003, with another (NFPG1) on the North Fork further up "near Doraville" at Graves Road since June 2001.

== Peachtree Creek Greenway ==
In October 2017, future plans were released for the Peachtree Creek Greenway that will run along Peachtree Creek. Construction on the first section of the Greenway began in late 2018 in Brookhaven. The goal of the greenway is to provide residents with close-to-home and close-to-work access to bicycle and pedestrian trails, serve transportation and recreation needs, and help encourage quality of life and sustainable economic growth. The trail will connect the cities of Atlanta, Brookhaven, Chamblee and Doraville.
