= Atlanta Area Council =

Boy Scouts of America local council

Atlanta Area Council (#092)
- Owner: Scouting America
- Headquarters: 1800 Circle 75 Parkway, SE Atlanta, GA 30339
- Country: United States
- Founded: 1916; 110 years ago
- Membership: 30,000 youth est.
- President: Joseph Blanco
- Council Commissioner: Brett DeVore
- Scout Executive: Tracy Techau
- Website scoutingatl.org

The Atlanta Area Council is a local council of Scouting America. It serves 13 northern Georgia counties: Carroll, Cherokee, Clayton, Cobb, DeKalb, Douglas, Fulton, Gwinnett, Haralson, Newton, Paulding, Pickens, and Rockdale.

== Organization ==
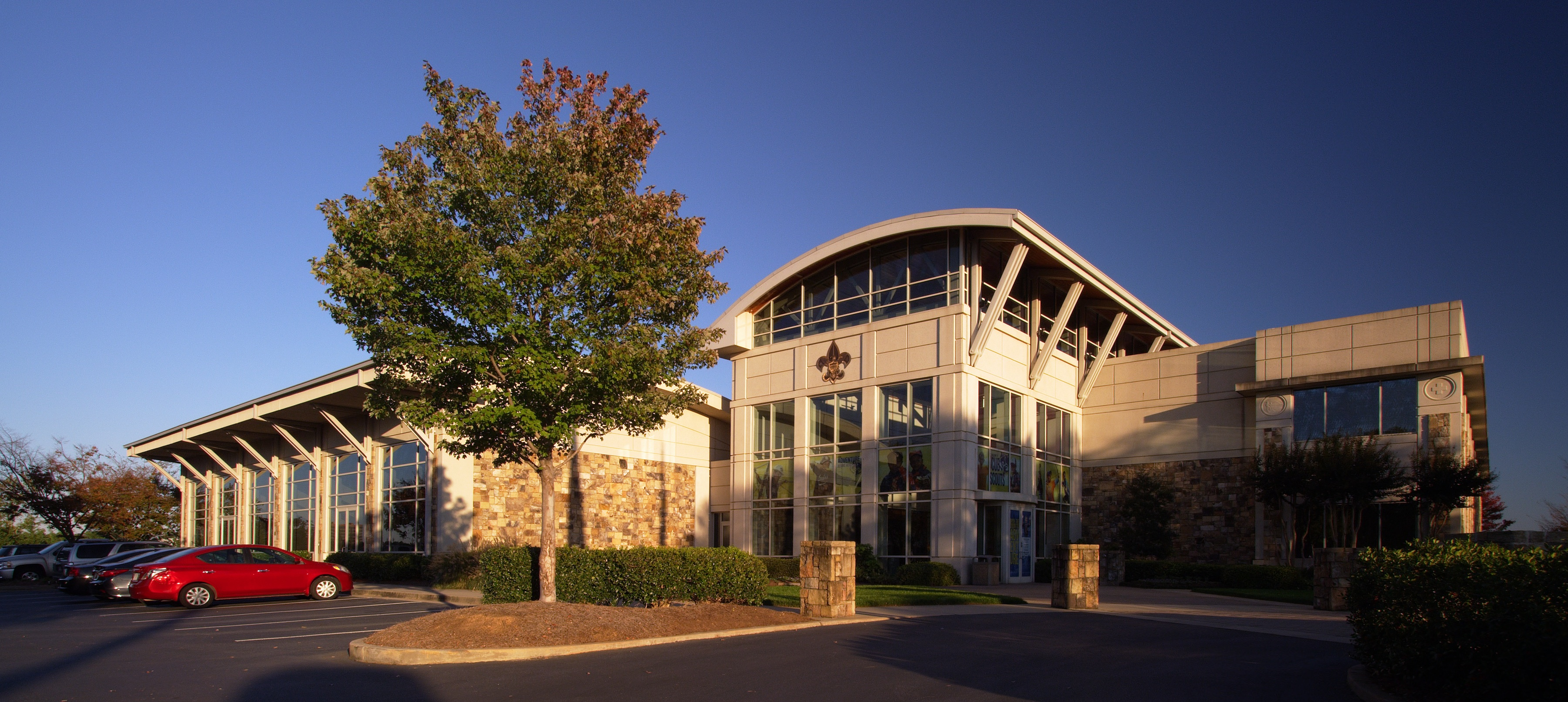
Headquarters of the Atlanta Area Council, Scouting America

The council is divided into districts:

- Appalachian Trail District
- Button Gwinnett District
- Foothills District
- Hightower Trail District
- Indian Springs District
- Northern Ridge District
- Phoenix District
- Picketts Mill District
- Silver Comet District
- Soapstone Ridge District
- Southwest Atlanta District
- Southern Crescent District
- Yellow River District

== History ==
The council was known as the Atlanta Council from 1915 to 1939, and as the Polaris Council in the 1950s.

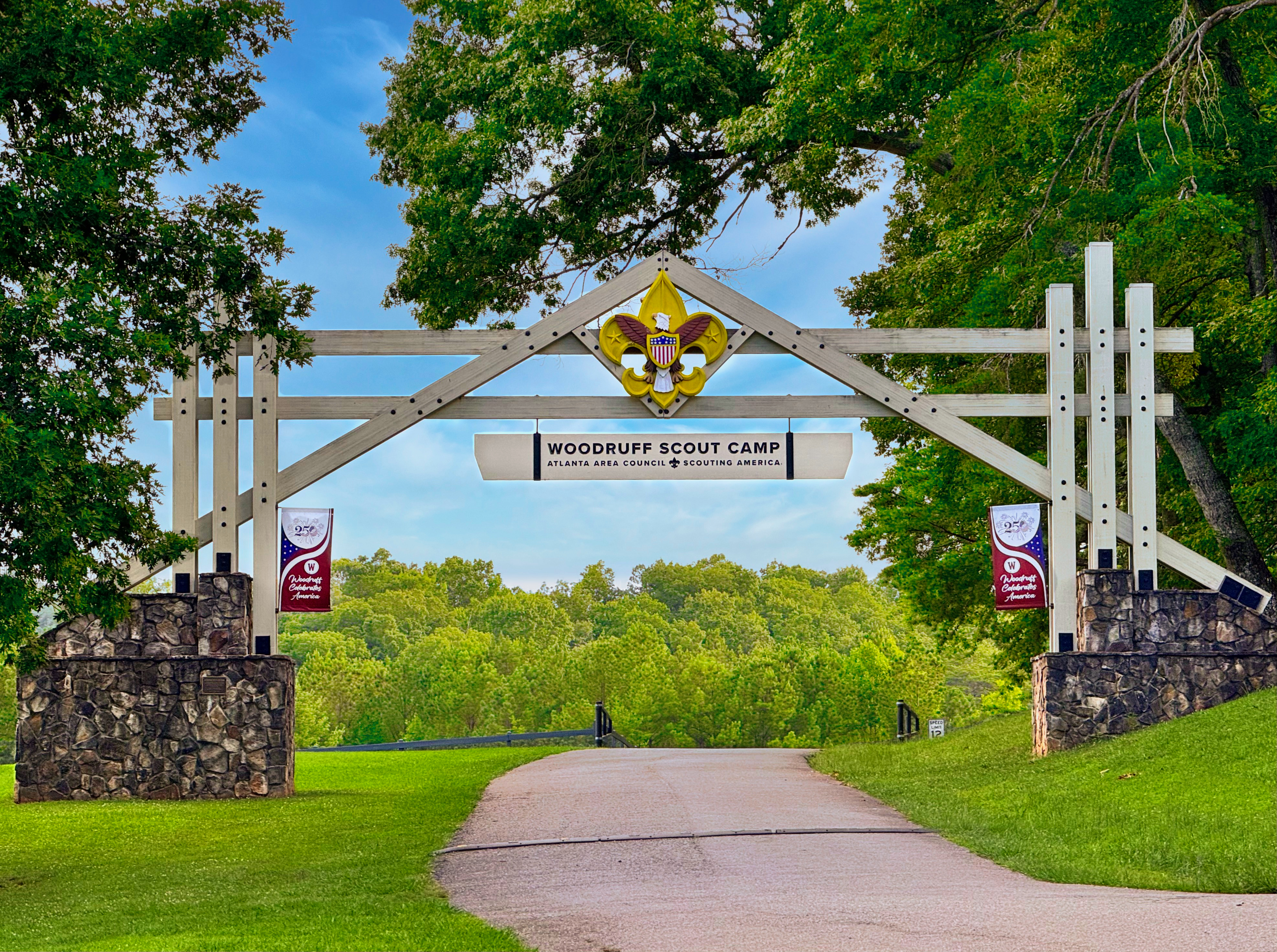
Robert W. Woodruff Scout Camp near Blairsville, Georgia

== Camps ==
- Bert Adams Scout Camp
- Robert W. Woodruff Scout Camp
- Allatoona Aquatics Base

== Order of the Arrow ==
Egwa Tawa Dee Lodge is the Order of the Arrow lodge that serves the Atlanta Area Council. It was chartered in 1938 as Broad-Winged-Hawk #129. Egwa Tawa Dee is translated from "equa tawadi", the Cherokee language for the lodge's totem, the broad-winged hawk whose literal translation is "big hawk"; for ease of pronunciation, it was spelled out as "Egwa Tawa Dee" to aid in pronunciation.

The lodge is divided into 12 chapters. Current chapters include Achewon Woapalanne, Echota, Etowah, Kennesaw, Nagatamen, Lowanne Nimat, Osten Nokose, Silepl Ilaonëtu, Tella Qualla Boundary, Thennethlofkee, Wesadicha and Wvhvlv en Hvresse. Past chapters include Awi-uska, Sagahattee, and South Fulton and collegiate OA chapters at the Georgia Institute of Technology and at Southern Polytechnic State University (now the Marietta Campus of Kennesaw State University).

== See also ==
- Scouting in Georgia (U.S. state)
