= Vinings, Georgia =

- Unincorporated community Census-designated place
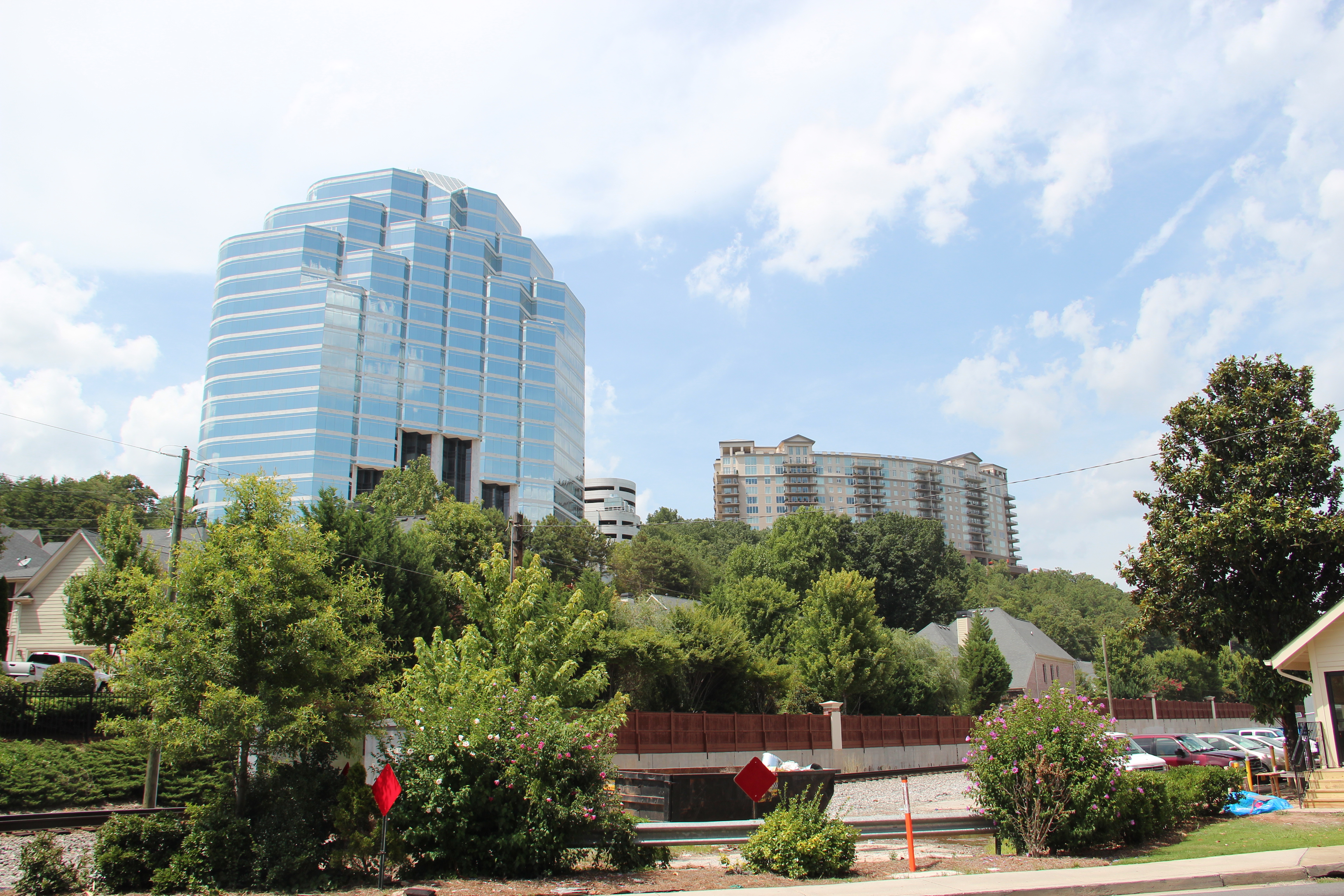
- High rises on Mount Wilkinson

- Location in Cobb County and the state of Georgia

- Location in Metro Atlanta
- Coordinates: 33°51′58.9″N 84°27′57.85″W
- Country: United States
- State: Georgia
- County: Cobb

Area
  - Total: 3.23 sq mi (8.37 km^{2})
  - Land: 3.13 sq mi (8.10 km^{2})
  - Water: 0.10 sq mi (0.27 km^{2})
- Elevation: 915 ft (279 m)

Population (2020)
  - Total: 12,581
  - Density: 4,024/sq mi (1,553.8/km^{2})
- Time zone: UTC-5 (Eastern (EST))
  - Summer (DST): UTC-4 (EDT)
- ZIP code: 30339
- Area codes: 770/678/470
- FIPS code: 13-79612
- GNIS feature ID: 0356615
- Website: http://www.vinings.com/

Vinings is an unincorporated community and census-designated place (CDP) in Cobb County, Georgia, United States that runs along the Chattahoochee River bank across from Buckhead. As of the 2020 census, the CDP had a total population of 12,581. Located next to the affluent Paces section of Buckhead in northwest Atlanta, Vinings is known for its historic sites, shopping districts, proximity to local freeways and The Battery, and nearby nature areas. The United States Postal Service assigns "Atlanta" to the ZIP Code (30339) that includes Vinings (area of Cobb County between Interstate 285 and the Chattahoochee River).

== History ==
Early on, Vinings was known as Crossroads, and then Paces, after Hardy Pace, circa 1830. He operated Pace's Ferry across the Chattahoochee River, in this area between Atlanta, Buckhead, and Smyrna. Paces Ferry Road is still the main east–west road through Vinings. The Western and Atlantic Railroad laid rail tracks from Chattanooga, Tennessee to Atlanta in the 1840s. Vinings became a construction station for the railroad, and was inadvertently named for William H. Vining, as he worked on the railroad construction of "Vining's Bridge" laying tracks in the area. The railroad is still state-owned as it was from the beginning, and is now leased to CSX.

The Union Army occupied the Vinings area during Sherman's Atlanta campaign of the American Civil War in 1864 and the subsequent March to the Sea. Pace's home, which had been used as a hospital for Union troops, was destroyed in the process. Vinings recovered after the war, as Governor Brown leased the railroad to Vinings to bring passengers to the springs and pavilions built to encourage a respite from the reconstruction of Atlanta. Vinings was officially recognized as a community in 1904, the same year the one-lane bridge was constructed across the Chattahoochee River. The town was never incorporated, though it had been discussed whether it should become a "township".

The Vinings Historic Preservation Society seeks to keep the town's history alive.

== Geography ==
Vinings is located at 33°51′58.9″N 84°27′57.85″W. According to the United States Census Bureau, the CDP has a total area of 3.3 square miles (8.5 km^{2}), of which 3.2 square miles (8.3 km^{2}) is land and 0.1 square miles (0.26 km^{2}), or 3.34%, is water.

== Demographics ==
Historical population
Census	Pop.	Note	%±
1990	7,417		—
2000	9,677		30.5%
2010	9,734		0.6%
2020	12,581		29.2%
U.S. Decennial Census; 1850-1870 1870-1880; 1890-1910 1920-1930; 1940 1950 1960; 1970 1980 1990; 2000 2010 2020

Vinings was first listed as a CDP in the 1990 U.S. census.

=== Racial and ethnic composition ===
Vinings, Georgia – Racial and ethnic composition Note: the US Census treats Hispanic/Latino as an ethnic category. This table excludes Latinos from the racial categories and assigns them to a separate category. Hispanics/Latinos may be of any race.
Race / Ethnicity (NH = Non-Hispanic)	Pop 2000	Pop 2010	Pop 2020	% 2000	% 2010	% 2020
White alone (NH)	7,805	5,913	6,459	80.66%	60.75%	51.34%
Black or African American alone (NH)	1,155	2,679	4,049	11.94%	27.52%	32.18%
Native American or Alaska Native alone (NH)	17	12	13	0.18%	0.12%	0.10%
Asian alone (NH)	357	402	689	3.69%	4.13%	5.48%
Native Hawaiian or Pacific Islander alone (NH)	2	6	3	0.02%	0.06%	0.02%
Other race alone (NH)	15	38	62	0.16%	0.39%	0.49%
Mixed race or Multiracial (NH)	107	182	476	1.11%	1.87%	3.78%
Hispanic or Latino (any race)	219	502	830	2.26%	5.16%	6.60%
Total	9,677	9,734	12,581	100.00%	100.00%	100.00%

=== 2020 census ===
As of the 2020 census, Vinings had a population of 12,581. The median age was 35.4 years. 12.2% of residents were under the age of 18 and 14.6% of residents were 65 years of age or older. For every 100 females there were 84.7 males, and for every 100 females age 18 and over there were 83.1 males age 18 and over.

100.0% of residents lived in urban areas, while 0.0% lived in rural areas.

There were 7,106 households in Vinings, of which 14.1% had children under the age of 18 living in them. Of all households, 26.7% were married-couple households, 26.4% were households with a male householder and no spouse or partner present, and 39.3% were households with a female householder and no spouse or partner present. About 47.9% of all households were made up of individuals and 8.0% had someone living alone who was 65 years of age or older.

There were 7,869 housing units, of which 9.7% were vacant. The homeowner vacancy rate was 2.8% and the rental vacancy rate was 9.8%.

=== 2000 census ===
As of the census of 2000, there were 9,677 people, 5,227 households, and 1,740 families residing in the CDP. The population density was 3,039.2 inhabitants per square mile (1,173.4/km^{2}). There were 5,670 housing units at an average density of 1,780.8 per square mile (687.6/km^{2}). The racial makeup of the CDP was 81.97% White, 12.09% African American, 0.19% Native American, 3.69% Asian, 0.03% Pacific Islander, 0.83% from other races, and 1.21% from two or more races. Hispanic or Latino of any race were 2.26% of the population.

There were 5,227 households, out of which 11.5% had children under the age of 18 living with them, 26.3% were married couples living together, 5.2% had a female householder with no husband present, and 66.7% were non-families. 43.3% of all households were made up of individuals, and 2.4% had someone living alone who was 65 years of age or older. The average household size was 1.84 and the average family size was 2.61.

In the CDP, the population was spread out, with 10.8% under the age of 18, 15.5% from 18 to 24, 50.9% from 25 to 44, 16.6% from 45 to 64, and 6.1% who were 65 years of age or older. The median age was 30 years. For every 100 females, there were 92.5 males. For every 100 females age 18 and over, there were 91.8 males.

The median income for a household in the CDP was $88,876, and the median income for a family was $105,121. Males had a median income of $78,685 versus $46,315 for females. The per capita income for the CDP was $61,068. About 3.3% of families and 5.2% of the population were below the poverty line, including 4.1% of those under age 18 and 3.9% of those age 65 or over.

== Government ==
Vinings is unincorporated, and is therefore under the jurisdiction of Cobb's county commission and other public services. After the success of Sandy Springs, there was discussion and at least one public meeting on whether the town should also incorporate as a "city" (the only type of municipality in Georgia). With residents evenly split, there was no consensus, and the idea was shelved mainly due to concerns about potential property tax increases.

However, some expressed optimism that the Georgia Township Act might allow it to become a "township", equivalent in function to a village in many other U.S. states. This would allow it control of zoning and other land uses (the major dispute with the county), and as written would cap additional property taxes at a half mill (0.5 per mille, or 50¢ per $1000 annually). As of 2013, the bill has not been reintroduced in the Georgia General Assembly.

The proposed boundaries were Interstate 285 along the northwest side, Interstate 75 at the northeast end, the Chattahoochee River on the southeast side, and Atlanta Road (old US 41 until Cobb Parkway was built in the 1950s) at the southwest end.

== Economy ==
The Atlanta Journal-Constitution stated that The Home Depot is headquartered in Vinings.

== Education ==
Vinings residents attend schools in the Cobb County School District. Most residents are zoned to Teasley Elementary School, while some are zoned to Nickajack Elementary School. All residents are zoned to Campbell Middle School and Campbell High School.
