= Pace's Ferry =

Ferry across the Chattahoochee River

Coordinates: 33°51′32.37″N 84°27′15.75″W

Through much of the 19th century, Pace's Ferry was a ferry across the Chattahoochee River near Atlanta. Started in the early 1830s near Peachtree Creek, it was run by Hardy Pace, one of the city's founders.

During the Atlanta campaign of the American Civil War, the Battle of Pace's Ferry was fought July 5, 1864.

== See also ==
- Historic ferries of the Atlanta area
- List of crossings of the Chattahoochee River
