= Demographics of Atlanta =

- Population pyramid of Atlanta in 2021
- Population: 498,715 (2020)

Atlanta is the capital and largest city in the state of Georgia. It ranks as the 36th-most populous city in the United States, and the eighth-most populous in the southeastern region. 2020 census results varied dramatically with previous Census Bureau estimates, counting a record 498,715 residents. Atlanta is the core city of the eighth most populous United States metropolitan area at 6,104,803 (est. 2020), with a combined statistical area of 6,930,423. For the first time since the 1960 Census, the 2020 Census revealed Atlanta is no longer majority African American. Atlanta has strongly increased in diversity in recent decades and is projected to continue.

== City of Atlanta ==
=== History ===
Atlanta's population grew steadily during the first 100 years of the city's existence, and peaked in 1970 at around 496,000. However, from 1970 to 2000, the city lost over 100,000 residents, a decrease of around 16 percent. During the same time, the metro area gained over three million people, cutting the city's share of the metro population in half, from over 25 percent in 1970 to around 12 percent in 2000. However, the city's population bottomed out in 1990 at around 394,000, and it has been increasing every year since then, reaching 420,003 residents in 2010. The population count increased more in the 2020 census to 498,715, surpassing the 1970 population.

Historical populations
Census	City	Region
1850	2,572	N/A
1860	9,554	N/A
1870	21,789	N/A
1880	37,409	N/A
1890	65,533	N/A
1900	89,872	419,375
1910	154,839	522,442
1920	200,616	622,283
1930	270,366	715,391
1940	302,288	820,579
1950	331,314	997,666
1960	487,455	1,312,474
1970	496,973	1,763,626
1980	425,022	2,233,324
1990	394,017	2,959,950
2000	416,474	4,112,198
2010	420,003	5,268,860
2020	498,715	6,089,815
*Estimates; Region: Combined Statistical Area (CSA)

=== Racial and ethnic composition ===
Atlanta city, Georgia – Racial and ethnic composition Note: the US Census treats Hispanic/Latino as an ethnic category. This table excludes Latinos from the racial categories and assigns them to a separate category. Hispanics/Latinos may be of any race.
Race / Ethnicity (NH = Non-Hispanic)	Pop 1980	Pop 1990	Pop 2000	Pop 2010	Pop 2020	% 1980	% 1990	% 2000	% 2010	% 2020
White alone (NH)	135,735	119,266	130,222	152,377	192,148	31.94%	30.27%	31.27%	36.28%	38.53%
Black or African American alone (NH)	280,608	263,107	254,062	224,316	233,018	66.02%	66.78%	61.00%	53.41%	46.72%
Native American or Alaska Native alone (NH)	600	511	594	754	767	0.14%	0.13%	0.14%	0.18%	0.15%
Asian alone (NH)	1,932	3,425	7,949	13,098	22,208	0.45%	0.87%	1.91%	3.12%	4.45%
Native Hawaiian or Pacific Islander alone (NH)	x	x	131	115	171	x	x	0.03%	0.03%	0.03%
Other race alone (NH)	397	183	630	739	2,493	0.09%	0.05%	0.15%	0.18%	0.50%
Mixed race or Multiracial (NH)	x	x	4,166	6,789	17,922	x	x	1.00%	1.62%	3.59%
Hispanic or Latino (any race)	5,750	7,525	18,720	21,815	29,988	1.35%	1.91%	4.49%	5.19%	6.01%
Total	425,022	394,017	416,474	420,003	498,715	100.00%	100.00%	100.00%	100.00%	100.00%

Once the nation's fourth largest black-majority city, Atlanta fell below 50% non-Hispanic African American in the 2020 census. The non-Hispanic African-American population has the largest percentage decline in the city since the 2000 census. The strongest growth of African Americans in the Atlanta area is in the surrounding suburbs. In 2020, at least 87% of the African American population in the Atlanta area lived outside the city.

The non-Hispanic White alone population of the city of Atlanta has grown significantly since 2000. Between 2000 and 2020, Atlanta's non-Hispanic White population had increased by 61,296 people while the black population declined by 21,044. The non-Hispanic White percentage increased from 31.3% in 2000, to 36.3% in 2010, to 38.5% in 2020. Since 2000, Atlanta demographics have drastically changed due to an influx of Whites into gentrifying intown neighborhoods, such as East Atlanta and the Old Fourth Ward, coupled with a stronger movement of blacks into surrounding suburbs, especially in Clayton County and DeKalb County, an influx of Asians and Hispanics moving into the city, combined with increased identification as mixed race and more children born in interracial marriages.

The city of Atlanta is becoming more diverse in the 21st century. The city long consisted overwhelmingly of non-Hispanic blacks and non-Hispanic Whites; those groups made up 92.1% of the city in 1990, but by 2020 their proportion had shrunk to 85.3%. Atlanta's Hispanic population increased 11,268 from 2000 to 2020, and in 2020 the city was 6.0% Hispanic. The Asian American population increased by 14,259 and in 2020 Asian Americans made up 4.5% of the city.

==== Income ====
In 2022, the median income for a household in Atlanta was $77,655. Also in 2022, 17.7% of the population lived below the poverty line which is down from 21.8% in 2010. Since 2000, poverty in most of Atlanta's suburbs is growing faster than in the city.

=== Sexual orientation and marital status ===
The city of Atlanta has one of the highest LGBT populations per capita in the nation. It ranked third of all major cities, behind San Francisco and slightly behind Seattle, with 12.8% of the city's total population recognizing themselves as gay, lesbian, or bisexual.

According to a 2024 Chamber of Commerce report, Atlanta is fourth in the nation for single-person households (44.5%). Within the past 10 years, the number of people living alone has increased by almost 5 million. Nearly half of those single-person households manifested during the pandemic. Compared to pre-pandemic (2019) rates, 2.4 million more people are living alone in 2024. Atlanta ranked 3rd in the nation for the most women living alone (29%) and 10th for men (24%).

=== Born out-of-state and foreign-born ===
In the city of Atlanta, Ga. 53% of residents were born in Georgia, 19.1% elsewhere in the South, 18.6% outside the South and 8.0% in a foreign country. Although the foreign-born population in the city itself is low among large US cities and even compared to Atlanta's own metro area, it is high compared to other nearby Southern cities. For example, in Macon, Georgia, 7.1% were US-born outside the South and 3.0% foreign-born, and in Birmingham, Alabama only 7.7% were US-born outside the South and 3.2% foreign-born.

=== Homelessness ===
According to a 2024 report, an estimated 3,000 people are dealing with chronic homelessness in Atlanta. Of that 3,000, about 1,000 do not stay in homeless shelters. Around 75% of the homeless population in the city are men and 86% self-identify as African American.

=== By county ===
Circa 2024, of the Atlanta residents, 491,711 of them lived in Fulton County and 28,292 of them lived in DeKalb County.

==== Race and ethnicity by neighborhood ====
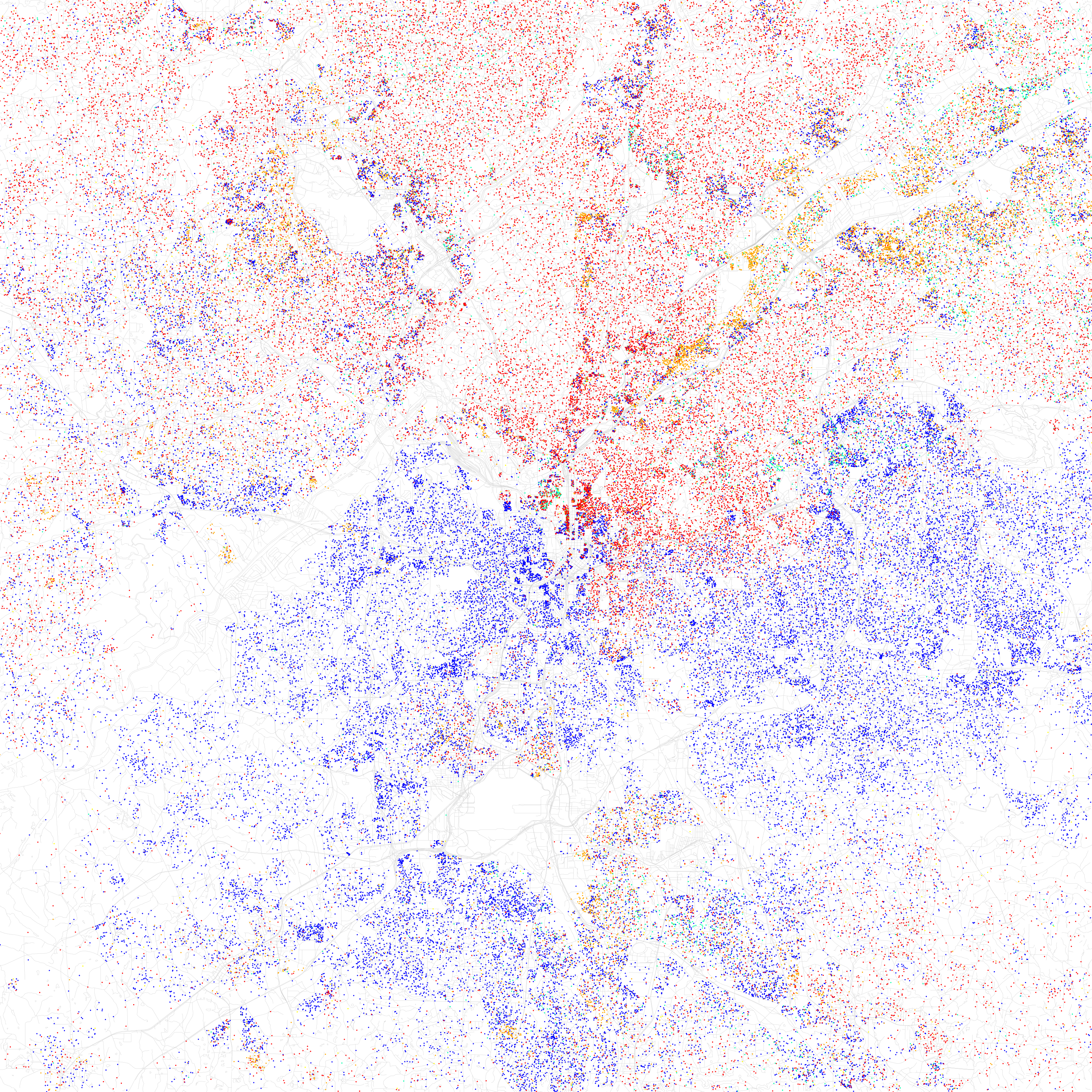
2010 map of race and ethnicity in Atlanta white black Hispanic (of any race) Asian

2010 census figures for Atlanta's 25 neighborhood planning units reveal several key facts about Atlanta's neighborhoods:

- 60% of the city's area consists of predominantly black neighborhoods: together, Northwest, Southwest, and Southeast Atlanta are 92% black
- there are some areas that are predominantly white, notably Buckhead and Northeast Atlanta (NPUs F and N) which are on average 80% white
- most of the fastest growing areas are central: Downtown (25.9%), Midtown, West Midtown, close-in east side neighborhoods (NPU N) (18.4%)
- the Ben Hill area at the southwest Perimeter is also growing quickly (up 5,452 people, 45.8%)
- population loss in areas of Northwest Atlanta (avg. -24.1%) and Southeast Atlanta (-20.5%), as well as some parts of Southwest Atlanta

Neighborhood Planning Unit (NPU)	Major neighborhoods	2010 pop.	2000 pop.	Growth %	White	Black	Asian	All other	Hispanic	Source
Downtown/Midtown
M	Downtown, Old Fourth Ward, Sweet Auburn, Castleberry Hill	26,886	21,359	25.9%	34.1%	56.1%	4.9%	4.9%	4.8%	
E	Midtown, Georgia Tech, Atlantic Station, Loring Heights, Brookwood Hills	42,121	34,461	22.2%	65.4%	17.4%	12.6%	4.6%	4.9%	
Buckhead
A	Paces, Margaret Mitchell, Mt. Paran/Northside, Chastain Park	11,687	11,300	3.4%	91.7%	3.2%	3.5%	1.7%	2.3%	
B	Buckhead Village, North Buckhead, Lindbergh, Pine Hills, Peachtree Heights, Garden Hills	47,292	38,645	22.4%	75.5%	12.3%	5.3%	6.8%	9.5%	
C	Collier Hills, Peachtree Battle, Arden/Habersham, SW Buckhead (W of Northside, S of Wesley)	18,122	16,199	11.9%	83.5%	8.4%	3.2%	4.9%	6.0%	
Northwest
G	West Highlands, Carey Park	8,381	11,632	-27.9%	3.3%	94.2%	0.5%	2.1%	1.9%	
J	Grove Park, Center Hill	12,533	17,085	-26.6%	1.9%	96.4%	0.1%	1.7%	1.3%	
K	Bankhead, Washington Park, Mozley Park, Hunter Hills	9,399	11,997	-21.7%	9.1%	88.5%	0.4%	2.0%	1.9%	
L	English Avenue, Vine City, (The Bluff)	6,148	7,316	-16.0%	6.1%	89.1%	1.0%	3.8%	2.8%	
Border Buckhead/West Midtown/Northwest
D	Whittier Mill Village, Riverside, Bolton, Underwood Hills, Huff Rd in W Midtown, Berkeley Park	10,690	8,690	23.0%	59.2%	23.9%	4.5%	12.4%	15.7%	
Northeast / East
F	Virginia-Highland, Morningside/Lenox Park	23,641	20,890	13.2%	79.6%	10.0%	3.3%	7.2%	9.7%	
N	Inman Park, Candler Park, Poncey-Highland, Reynoldstown, Cabbagetown, Lake Claire	17,389	14,688	18.4%	79.9%	13.2%	2.7%	4.2%	4.2%	
O	Edgewood, Kirkwood, East Lake	13,886	14,724	-5.7%	36.9%	58.7%	1.4%	3.0%	2.5%	
W	Grant Park, East Atlanta, Ormewood Park, Benteen Park	19,233	20,054	-4.1%	54.8%	38.0%	1.7%	5.5%	6.5%	
Southwest
H	Adamsville, areas S of I-20, W of I-285, N of Cascade Rd	14,049	17,274	-18.7%	2.1%	92.3%	0.2%	5.4%	6.2%	
I	Collier Heights, Peyton Forest, Cascade Heights	20,741	21,500	-3.5%	2.2%	94.1%	0.1%	3.6%	4.2%	
P	Ben Hill, (SW Atlanta W of I-285)	17,363	11,911	45.8%	1.9%	95.0%	0.6%	2.5%	1.9%	
Q	Midwest Cascade, Regency Trace	1,770	1,024	72.9%	1.5%	96.5%	1.0%	1.0%	0.6%	
R	Adams Park, Campbellton Road, Greenbriar	16,452	16,679	-1.4%	1.4%	96.8%	0.1%	1.6%	1.4%	
S	Oakland City, Venetian Hills, Cascade Avenue/Road, Fort McPherson	10,204	12,396	-17.7%	4.0%	93.8%	0.2%	2.0%	1.2%	
T	West End, Westview, Atlanta University Center, Ashview Heights	16,280	20,095	-19.0%	2.3%	94.5%	0.4%	2.9%	2.3%	
V	Capitol Gateway, Summerhill, Peoplestown, Mechanicsville, Pittsburgh, Adair Park	14,198	15,825	-10.3%	6.3%	89.3%	1.3%	3.1%	2.5%	
X	Capitol View, Capitol View Manor, Sylvan Hills, Hammond Park, Perkerson	12,398	14,999	-17.3%	10.5%	83.2%	0.7%	5.6%	5.8%	
Southeast
Y	South Atlanta, Lakewood Heights, Chosewood Park	11,111	12,472	-10.9%	14.3%	80.6%	0.4%	4.7%	9.2%	
Z	Thomasville Heights, Glenrose Park, Southern Jonesboro Rd Corridor	18,050	24,210	-25.4%	3.1%	92.8%	0.4%	3.7%	4.2%	

===== Major shifts from 2000 to 2010 =====
Rise in white population:

- In NPU W (East Atlanta, Grant Park, Ormewood Park, Benteen Park), the black population went from 57.6% to 38.0%, and the white proportion rose from 36.5% to 54.8%
- In NPU O (Edgewood, Kirkwood, East Lake area), the black population went from 86.2% to 58.7%, and the white proportion rose from 11.3% to 36.9%.
- In NPU L (English Avenue, Vine City), the black proportion of the population went down from 97.5% to 89.1%, while the white proportion rose from 1.3% to 6.1%. Note that there many infill residential units were added in the King Plow Arts Center area, which falls under English Avenue but which in character is an extension of the Marietta Street Artery and West Midtown.
- In NPU D, stretching from West Midtown along the border of Buckhead and northwestern Atlanta, westward towards the river, the white proportion rose from 49.3% to 59.2% with the black proportion dropping from 36.5% to 23.9%

Increasing black population:

- In NPU X (Metropolitan Parkway corridor), the black proportion of the population rose from 59.5% to 83.2%, while the White, Asian and Hispanic proportion dropped about three percentage points each.
- NPU B (central Buckhead) became more diverse, with the white proportion dropping from 82.8% to 75.5%, the black proportion rising from 5.9% to 12.3%, and the Asian proportion from 3.1% to 5.3%

=== Daytime population ===
According to a 2000 daytime population estimate by the Census Bureau, over 250,000 more people commuted to Atlanta on any given workday, boosting the city's estimated daytime population to 676,431. This is an increase of 62.4% over Atlanta's resident population, making it the largest gain in daytime population in the country among cities with fewer than 500,000 residents.

=== Timeline ===
1850 - 2,572

- City limits a circle with radius of 1 mile (3.14 mi^{2})

1860 - 9,554

- 1866 city limits enlarged to a radius of 1.5 miles (7 mi^{2})

1870 - 21,789

1880 - 37,409

- had eclipsed Savannah to become Georgia's largest city
- 1889 city limits enlarged to a radius of 1.75 miles, Inman Park also annexed. (9.6 mi^{2})

1890 - 65,533

- 1894 annexation of West End (adding 1.0 mi^{2} for a total of 11 mi^{2})

1900 - 89,872, including 2500 persons of foreign birth and 35,900 of African descent.

- 1909: annexation of Edgewood, Reynoldstown, East Atlanta, Copenhill and part of Druid Hills

1910 - 154,839 (metro 522,442)

- 1910: annexation of 5.5 mi^{2} to the north and west and 3.2 mi^{2} to the southwest and south including Oakland City

1920 - 200,616 (metro 622,283)

1930 - 270,688 (metro 715,391)

1940 - 302,288 (metro 820,579)

1950 - 331,314 (metro 997,666)

- 1952: annexation of 80 mi^{2} in Buckhead, Adams Park, Southwest Atlanta & Lakewood, adding 100,000 people (total city area 130 mi^{2})

1960 - 487,455 (metro 1,312,474)

1970 - 496,973 (metro 1,763,626)

1980 - 425,022 (metro 2,233,324)

1990 - 394,017 (metro 2,959,950)

2000 - 416,474 (metro 4,112,198)

2010 - 420,003 (metro 5,268,860)

2020 - 498,715 (metro 6,089,815)

- Highest population in the history of Atlanta

=== Projections ===
Atlanta is projected to have a population of around 590,000 people by 2030. However, this projection assumes Atlanta garners only seven percent of the metro's growth during that period. If the city were to capture ten percent of metro Atlanta's growth, it would reach a population of 660,000 people by 2030. Also Atlanta is expected to become much more diverse. For many decades Atlanta was largely made up of Blacks and Whites. However, Hispanics and Asians are expected to make up a more notable percentage of the total population by 2050.

=== Languages ===
Spanish is the second most common language spoken in Atlanta.

=== Place of birth ===
Most of Atlanta's immigrants were born in Mexico.

== Ancestries ==
Ancestry by origin	Number as of 2022	%
American	17,838	

== Metro Atlanta ==
The metro area's Hispanic population more than doubled from 268,851 in 2000 to 730,470 in 2020, and now makes up 12.0% of the region's population while Blacks have declined to 33.2%. These immigrant communities have altered the economic, cultural, and religious landscape of metro Atlanta. The Asian American population in the metro makes up 6.5% of the region's population per the 2020 census. Gwinnett County has become one of the most diverse counties in the nation.

Race, ethnicity, or foreign-born status	Pop. 2010	% of total 2010	Pop. 2000^{[A]}	% of total 2000	absolute change 2000-2010^{[B]}	% change 2000-2010^{[B]}
Total	5,268,860		4,112,198			
White only	2,920,480	55.4%	2,589,888	63.0%	330,592	12.8%
Non-Hispanic white only	2,671,757	50.7%	2,447,856	59.5%	223,901	9.1%
Black only	1,707,913	32.4%	1,189,179	28.9%	518,734	43.6%
Asian only and Pacific Islander only	356,956	4.9%	137,640	3.3%	119,316	86.7%
Asian Indian	178,980	1.5%	37,162	0.9%	41,818	112.5%
Korean	93,870	0.8%	22,317	0.5%	21,553	96.6%
Chinese	67,660	0.7%	22,564	0.5%	15,096	66.9%
Vietnamese	56,554	0.7%	23,996	0.6%	12,558	52.3%
Hispanic or Latino of any race	547,400	10.4%	268,851	6.5%	278,549	103.6%
Mexican	314,351	6.0%	165,109	4.0%	149,242	90.4%
Puerto Rican	93,337	0.8%	19,358	0.5%	23,979	123.9%
Cuban	47,648	0.3%	9,206	0.2%	8,442	91.7%
Colombian	42,500	0.3%	8,500	0.1%	33,000	91.7%
Foreign-born	716,434	13.6%	424,519	10.3%	291,915	68.8%

^{A} Atlanta MSA in 2000 did not include Butts, Dawson, Haralson, Heard, Jasper, Lamar, Meriwether, and Pike counties, whose population totalled in 2000: 135,783; in 2010: 156,368 (2.96% of total new 28-county metro)
^{B} Compares the larger 28-county Atlanta-Sandy Springs-Marietta MSA 2010 with a smaller 20-county Atlanta MSA 2000; however the 8 new counties represent less than 3% of the larger 28-county metro.
Source: for race and Hispanic population, U.S. Census Bureau 2010 and 2000 census; for foreign-born population: US Census Bureau 2010 and 2000 American Community Surveys; Immigrants in 2010 Metropolitan America, Brookings Institution

=== Race and ethnicity ===
The 2010 census counted 5,268,860 people in the 28-county metropolitan area. This was an increase of 1,020,879 since 2000, the second largest growth of any U.S. metropolitan area behind that of Houston. This represented a proportional increase of 24.0%, again second-highest (after Houston) among the ten largest metropolitan areas of the United States.

White Americans made up 55.4% of metro Atlanta's population, a relative decrease from 63.0% ten years earlier, but still an absolute increase of over 330,000 people. Non-Hispanic whites dropped from 59.5% to 50.7% of the metro's population, increasing by about 224,000 people.

Black Americans are the largest racial minority with 32.4% of the population, up from 28.9% in 2000. The city of Atlanta has long been regarded as a "black mecca" for its role as a center of black education, political power, wealth, and culture. From 2000 to 2010, the geographic disbursement of blacks in Metro Atlanta changed radically. Long concentrated in the city of Atlanta and DeKalb County, the black population there dropped while over half a million African Americans settled across other parts of the metro area, including approximately 112,000 in Gwinnett County, 71,000 in Fulton outside Atlanta, 58,000 in Cobb, 50,000 in Clayton, 34,000 in Douglas, and 27,000 each in Newton and Rockdale Counties.

Year	Black pop. in City of Atlanta	Black pop. in DeKalb County	Total black pop. Atlanta + DeKalb	Total black pop. Metro Atlanta	Proportion of black pop. in Atlanta + DeKalb
2000	255,689	361,111	616,800	1,189,179	51.9%
2010	226,894	375,697	602,591	1,707,913	35.2%

Hispanic Americans are the fastest growing ethnic group. At 10.4% of the metro's population in 2010, versus only 6.5% in 2000, the metro's Hispanic population increased an astounding 103.6%, or 278,459 people, in ten years. Major Hispanic groups include 314,351 Mexicans, 43,337 Puerto Ricans and 17,648 Cubans. All of those groups' populations increased by over 90% in the ten-year period. Of the metro's 279,000-person increase in the Hispanic population from 2000 to 2010, 98,000 came in Gwinnett County, 37,000 in Cobb, 25,000 in Fulton (all but 3,000 outside the city of Atlanta), 20,000 in Hall, and 15,000 in DeKalb County. The Hispanic population is heavily concentrated in the northeastern section of the Atlanta metropolitan Area.

The Asian American population also increased rapidly from 2000 to 2010. There were 256,956 Asian Americans in the metro area in 2010, making up 4.9% of the population. This represented an 87% increase over 2000. The largest Asian groups are 78,980 Indians, 43,870 Koreans, 37,660 Chinese and 36,554 Vietnamese.

Atlanta has Georgia's largest Bosnian American population with approximately 10,000 in the metro area, mainly in Gwinnett County and DeKalb County

The most common reported ancestries in Atlanta were English, American, German, Irish, Italian, Scottish, African, French, Polish, Russian and Dutch.

109,023 Italians live in the Atlanta area.

There is a small Romani community in Atlanta.

There is a substantial Mexican population in Atlanta. Mexicans are concentrated in Gwinnett County.

Jamaicans are concentrated in Stone Mountain, Decatur, Lithonia, Lawrenceville and Snellville.

Ethiopians and Eritreans are present in Atlanta.

There is a small Japanese community in the metro Atlanta area.

There is a Brazilian community in the metro Atlanta area. Brazilians are concentrated in Marietta, Sandy Springs and Alpharetta.

There is a Nigerian community in Atlanta. Nigerians are concentrated in DeKalb and Gwinnett counties.

There is an Iranian presence in Atlanta. Cobb County is home to the largest population of Iranians in Atlanta.

About 9,400 Cubans live in the Atlanta area. Approximately 4,900 were born in Cuba. DeKalb County has the largest Cuban population in Atlanta.

Haitians are present in Atlanta.

There is a Pakistani community in metro Atlanta.

There is an Indian community in Atlanta.

=== Foreign-born population ===
Metro Atlanta is increasingly international, with its 716,434 foreign-born residents in 2010, a 69% increase versus 2000. This was the fourth largest rate of growth among the nation's top 100 metros, after Baltimore, Orlando and Las Vegas. The foreign-born proportion of the population went up from 10.3% to 13.6%, and Atlanta moved up from 14th to 12th in ranking of US metro areas with the largest immigrant population by sheer numbers. Still, its 13.6% proportion of immigrants is only the 29th highest of the nation's top 100 metros.

Metro Atlanta's immigrants are more suburban than most other cities'. Out of the top 100 US metros, Atlanta has the 11th highest ratio of the foreign-born living in the suburbs and not in the core city. Atlanta does not have single centers of ethnic groups such as a Koreatown, but rather areas such as the Buford Highway Corridor in DeKalb County and parts of Gwinnett County are commercial centers for multiple ethnic communities.

In 1990 Greater Atlanta had the largest Japanese population in the Southeast United States. The Consulate General of Japan in Atlanta estimated that, during that year, 3,500 to 4,000 Japanese lived in Greater Atlanta. Of the metropolitan areas in the Southeast United States, in 1990 Greater Atlanta had the most extensive education network for Japanese nationals.

8% of the foreign born population in Atlanta is black. Cobb County has the largest Haitian population. Nigerians are concentrated in DeKalb County.

3.2 percent of immigrants in Atlanta were born in Jamaica and are Jamaican.

In the Atlanta-Sandy Springs- Marietta, GA area the African foreign born population came from Nigeria, Ethiopia, Ghana, Kenya, Liberia, South Africa, Somalia, Cameroon Sierra Leone and Togo.

There is an Eritrean community in Atlanta.

=== Religion ===
Religion in Atlanta, while historically centered around Protestant Christianity, now involves many faiths as a result of the city and metro area's increasingly international population. While Protestant Christianity still maintains a strong presence in the city (63%), in recent decades Catholicism has gained a strong foothold due to migration patterns. Metro Atlanta also has a considerable number of ethnic Christian congregations, including Korean and Indian churches. Large non-Christian faiths are present in the form of Islam, Judaism, and Hinduism. Overall, there are over 1,000 places of worship within Atlanta.

=== Language ===
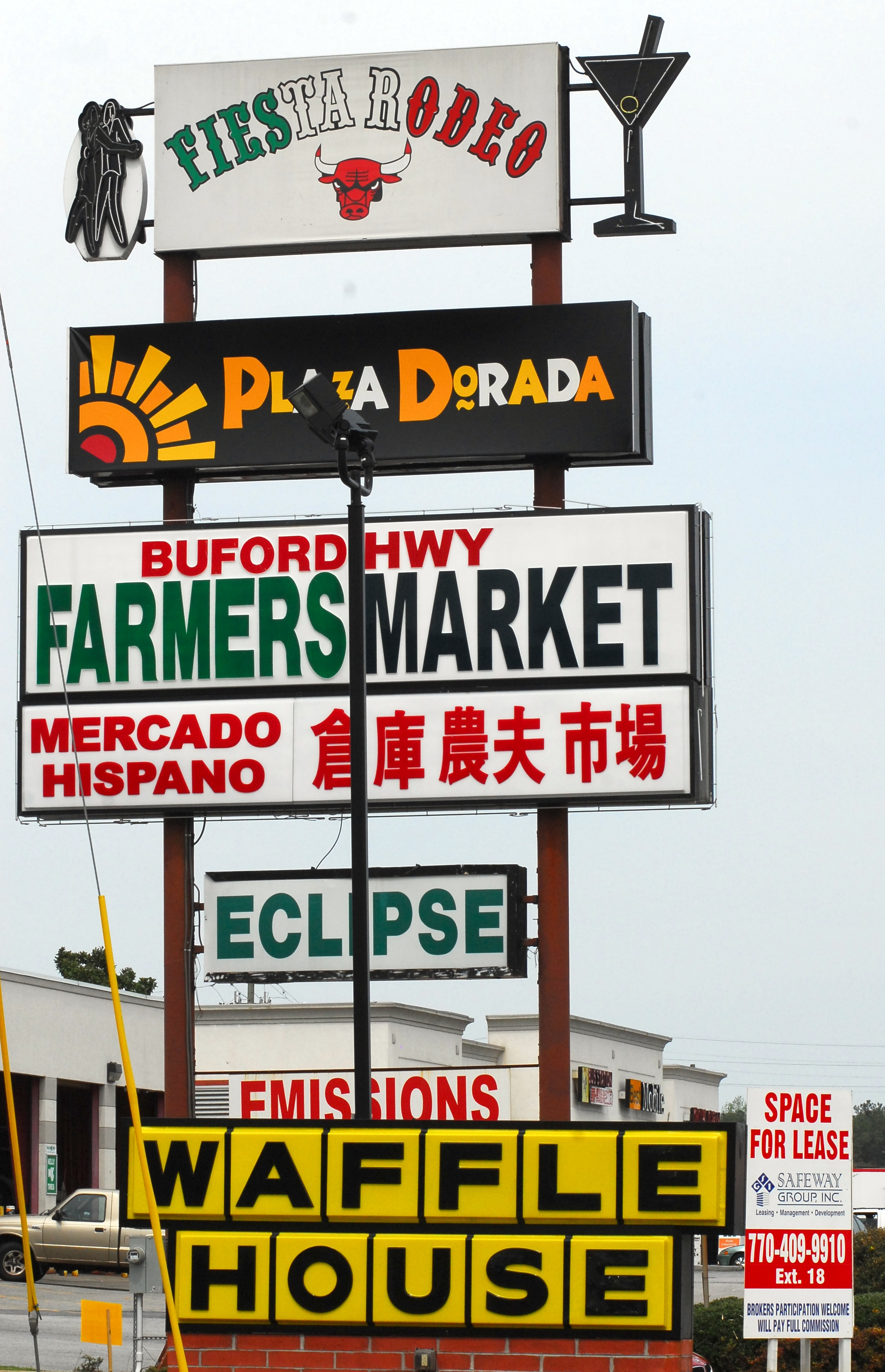
Signs in English, Spanish and Chinese along Buford Highway in Metro Atlanta

In 2008, approximately 83.3% of the population five years and older spoke only English at home, which is roughly 4,125,000 people. Over 436,000 people (8.8%) spoke Spanish at home, making Metro Atlanta the 15th highest number of Spanish speakers among American metropolitan areas (MSAs). Over 193,000 people (3.9%) spoke other Indo-European languages at home. People who speak an Asian language at home numbered over 137,000 and made up 2.8% of the population.
