= Peachtree Park =

- Peachtree Highlands–Peachtree Park Historic District
- U.S. National Register of Historic Places
- U.S. Historic district
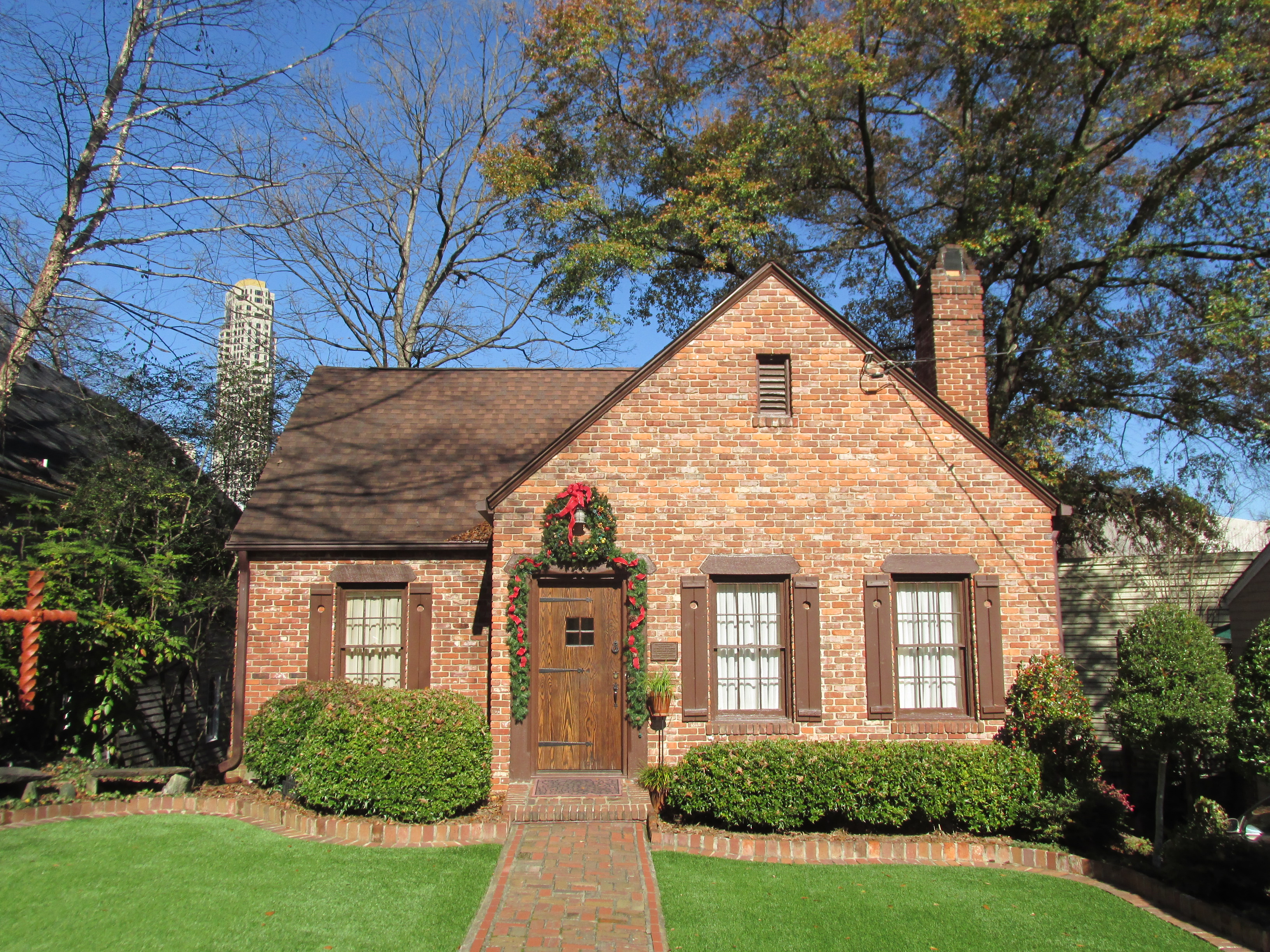
- A house on Highland Drive

- Location within Atlanta Location within Georgia Location within the United States
- Location: Roughly bounded by Piedmont & Peachtree Rds., GA 400 & MARTA N-S line., Atlanta, Georgia
- Coordinates: 33.84167°N 84.36639°W
- Area: 200 acres (81 ha)
- Architect: O.B. Jacobs, et al.
- Architectural style: Late 19th And 20th Century Revivals, Bungalow/Craftsman
- NRHP reference No.: 08000325
- Added to NRHP: April 25, 2008

Peachtree Park is a neighborhood in the Buckhead Community of Atlanta, Georgia.

It is bounded by:

- Peachtree Road and North Buckhead on the northwest
- Georgia 400 and Lenox Square and Pine Hills on the east
- MARTA north-south rail line and the Miami Circle design district of Lindbergh/Morosgo on the southeast
- Piedmont Road and Buckhead Village and Garden Hills on the west

== Historic district ==
The neighborhood is roughly contiguous with the Peachtree Highlands-Peachtree Park Historic District, listed on the National Register of Historic Places.

The district is significant for a collection of architectural styles from 1921–1957 and for community planning and development. Styles include Colonial Revival, Craftsman, and English Vernacular revival.

The district was listed on April 25, 2008 (listing number 08000325) and is larger than its predecessor, the Peachtree Highlands Historic District (listed 1986), which it superseded.

== Government ==
Peachtree Park is part of Neighborhood planning unit (NPU) B.
