= Lindbergh, Atlanta =

Human settlement in Atlanta, Georgia, United States of America

Coordinates: 33.825°N 84.365°W

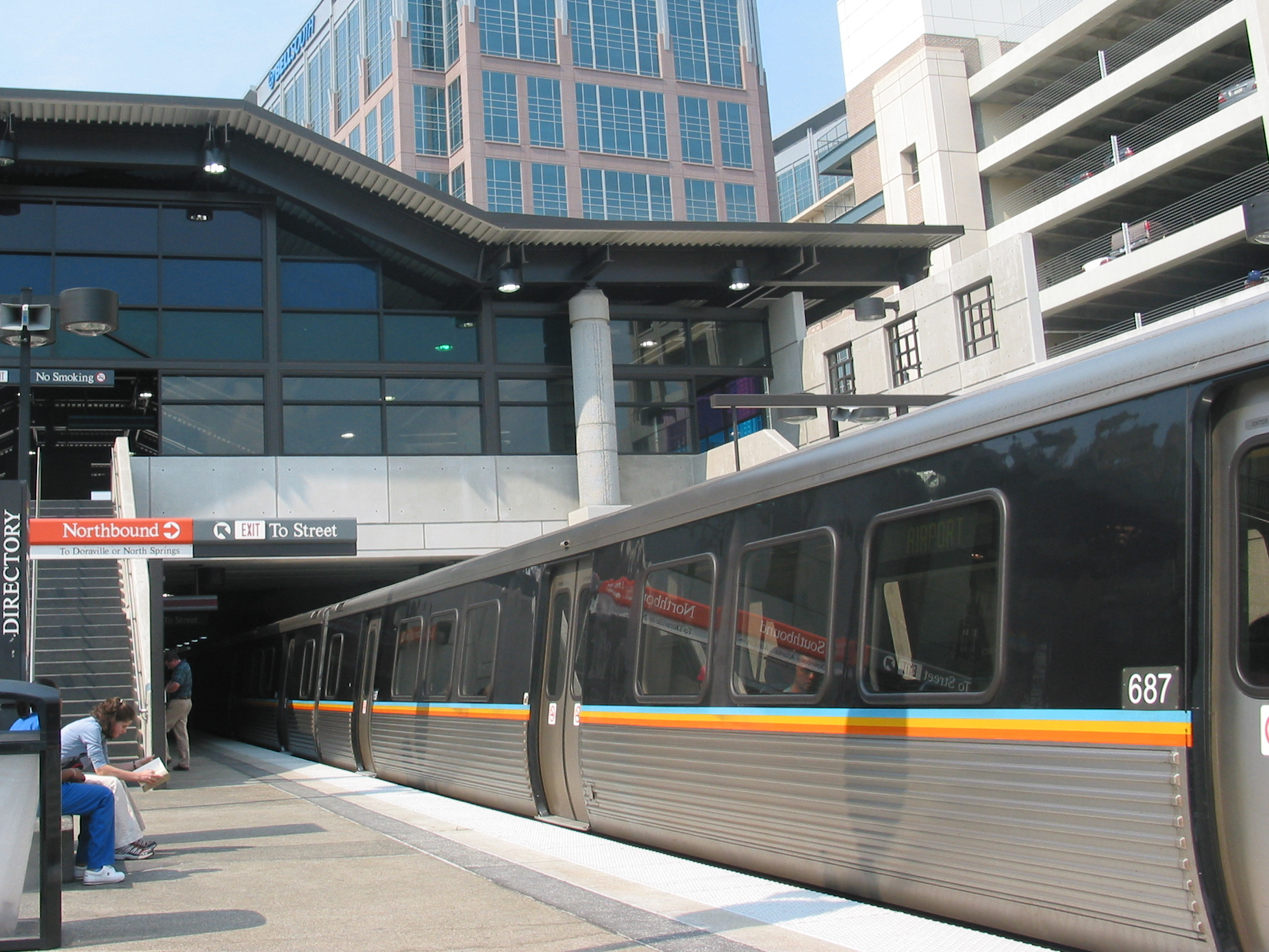
Lindbergh Center MARTA subway station with one of the two AT&T Towers in the background

Lindbergh, officially Lindbergh/Morosgo, is a neighborhood in the Buckhead district of Atlanta, Georgia. Most of the neighborhood consists of multi-use development combining retail, office and residential space.

== Geography ==
Lindbergh is bordered on the northwest by a freight railroad line, across which lie the Peachtree Park, Garden Hills, and Peachtree Hills neighborhoods. The eastern border is Georgia 400 and Pine Hills. The Armour industrial area is to the southwest, and to the southeast is I-85 and Lindridge/Martin Manor.

== History ==
A lake known as Mooney's Lake was originally located in Lindbergh, on the east side of Piedmont Road. Deuward S. Mooney developed it into a recreation center in 1920. It had two spring water pools, a lake for swimming and canoeing, horseback riding, miniature golf, and a railroad. Food was sold at the pavilion, and there was dancing to jukebox music. The pavilion burned down in the 1950s and subsequently went out of business.

In 1958, Mooney's Lake was drained and the developers Jordan, Davis and Carter built the Broadview Shopping Center (later "Lindbergh Plaza mall"). By 1963, the center housed about 30 retail stores, including a two-level K-mart as well as the Great Southeast Music Hall, where in the 1970s prominent artists played, such as Billy Joel, Nitty Gritty Dirt Band, Sex Pistols, and B. B. King. During this time, the Georgia Department of Transportation was acquiring land for what is now Georgia Route 400 freeway, and so the surrounding land had a network of dirt roads, one of which was located where Sidney Marcus Boulevard is today and which connected Buford Highway to Lindbergh Drive.

In the late 1990s, planning began between MARTA, the city, developers, and BellSouth to build a town center for the neighborhood in the area surrounding the MARTA station and renovate Lindbergh Plaza shopping mall. Lindbergh City Center opened in phases starting in 2003, while Lindbergh Plaza's renovation won the Atlanta Business Chronicle's 2006 "Mixed-Use Deal of the Year" award.

== Transportation ==
Lindbergh serves as a transportation hub, both in terms of roads and transit. Georgia 400 reaches its terminus at I-85. The Lindbergh MARTA station is a hub for MARTA buses, and is also a terminus of the Georgia Bus Company "jitneys" (minibuses) that ply Buford Highway. Lindbergh Center's function as a transit hub may strengthen, as it has been identified as a northern terminus of a Beltline corridor light rail route, as well as a possible northern terminus for a rail line to Emory University along the Clifton Corridor.

PATH400 is a multi-use trail that passes through the eastern portion of Lindbergh.
