= Lindridge (disambiguation) =

Lindridge may refer to:

- Lindridge, a village in Worcestershire, England
- Lindridge/Martin Manor a town in Atlanta, Georgia, USA
- Lindridge House a country house in Devon, England
