= List of diplomatic missions in Georgia =

List of diplomatic missions in Georgia may refer to:

- List of diplomatic missions in Georgia (country)
- List of diplomatic missions in Atlanta
