= Buckhead Forest =

Neighborhood of Atlanta, Georgia

Coordinates: 33.845631°N 84.376547°W

Buckhead Forest is a neighborhood of 165 homes in the Buckhead district of Atlanta, Georgia.

It is bounded by:

- Peachtree Road and Buckhead Village on the southeast
- Roswell Road and South Tuxedo Park on the west
- Piedmont Road and North Buckhead on the northeast

== Government ==
Buckhead Forest is part of NPU B.
