= Relay Bike Share =

Atlanta public bicycle sharing system

Overview
- Locale: Buckhead; Downtown; Eastside; Midtown; West Midtown
- Transit type: Bicycle sharing system
- Number of stations: 75
- Website: relaybikeshare.com

Operation
- Began operation: June 9, 2016; 10 years ago
- Ended operation: December 2022; 3 years ago
- Operator: CycleHop
- Number of vehicles: 500 bikes

Relay Bike Share was a public bicycle sharing system located in Atlanta, Georgia.

== History ==
Launched in June 2016 by the City of Atlanta, the system ran year-round. Relay Bike Share expanded in November 2016 from 10 to 22 stations and extended the service area to include Midtown Atlanta. In the summer of 2017, three new hubs were launched in Buckhead.

As of 2017, there were over 500 bicycles, and 65 stations within the Atlanta area.

In September 2019, The Atlanta Journal-Constitution reported that Relay rental numbers significantly dropped from 11,000-12,000 rides a month in May to 2018, to 2,321 in August 2019, as other micromobility companies entered Atlanta.

Relay was discontinued in December 2022, when Relay Bike Share and the City of Atlanta agreed to terminate their contract.

== Coverage area and expansion ==
Most of the stations were in Midtown and Downtown. However, three new stations were added in Buckhead in 2017.

== See also ==
- Cycling in Atlanta
- Cycling infrastructure
- PATH Foundation
