= Georgia State Route 237 =

Highway in Georgia

State Route 237
- Piedmont Road NE
- SR 237 highlighted in red

Route information
- Maintained by GDOT
- Length: 3.2 mi (5.1 km)
- Existed: 1946–present

Major junctions
- South end: Piedmont Road NE in Midtown Atlanta
- I-85 south / SR 13 south in Midtown Atlanta; SR 236 in Buckhead; SR 141 in Buckhead; SR 141 Conn. in North Buckhead
- North end: US 19 / SR 9 in North Buckhead

Location
- Country: United States
- State: Georgia
- Counties: Fulton

Highway system
- Georgia State Highway System; Interstate; US; State; Special
← SR 236	→ SR 238

State Route 237 (SR 237) is a 3.2-mile-long (5.1 km) state highway located entirely within the city limits of Atlanta in the U.S. state of Georgia. Its path is entirely within Fulton County.

== Route description ==
SR 237 begins just south of SR 13 (Buford Highway) in Midtown Atlanta, where the road continues to the south as Piedmont Road. It immediately crosses under, but does not intersect Buford Highway and Interstate 85 (I-85).

There is no interchange with I-85. However, there are ramps to southbound Buford Highway from southbound Piedmont Road as well as a ramp from northbound Buford Highway to northbound Piedmont Road; there is no access to I-85.

North of I-85, the road crosses over a CSX Transportation rail line. It heads north and northwest to SR 141 (Peachtree Road SW). The highway heads northwest to meet its northern terminus, an intersection with US 19/SR 9 (Roswell Road) in North Buckhead. SR 237 is known as Piedmont Road NE for its entire length.

No section of SR 237 is part of the National Highway System, a system of routes determined to be the most important for the nation's economy, mobility and defense.

== History ==
SR 237 was established at the latest by 1946 along an alignment that started at US 23, which traveled on Cheshire Bridge Road and a southern continuation of Piedmont Road NE at that time. This is just south of the current southern terminus. SR 237 headed north along Piedmont Road NE as it does today. In 1967, US 23 was moved farther to the east. However, it is not clear whether the portion of SR 237 between the former US 23 segment and its current southern terminus was decommissioned at this time.

== Major intersections ==
The entire route is in Fulton County.

Location	mi	km	Destinations	Notes
Morningside/Lenox Park	0.0	0.0		Southern terminus; roadway continues as Piedmont Road NE, a former portion of SR 237.
Morningside/Lenox Park	0.1	0.16	SR 13 south	No access from SR 237 north to Buford/Spring Connector south
Buckhead	0.55	0.89	SR 236 east (Lindbergh Drive NE) – Tucker	Western terminus of SR 236
Buckhead	0.75	1.21	Morosgo Drive NE – Lindbergh Center station	
Buckhead	0.9	1.4	Sidney Marcus Boulevard to SR 400 north – Chamblee	
Buckhead	2.2	3.5	SR 141 (Peachtree Road NE) – Brookhaven	
North Buckhead	2.6	4.2	SR 141 Conn. east (Lenox Road) / Carson Lane – Buckhead	Western terminus of SR 141 Conn.
North Buckhead	3.2	5.1	US 19 / SR 9 (Roswell Road) – Atlanta, Roswell, Chastain Park	Northern terminus; roadway continues as Blackland Road NW.
1.000 mi = 1.609 km; 1.000 km = 0.621 mi: Incomplete access

== See also ==
- Transportation in Atlanta
