= Lindridge/Martin Manor =

Neighborhood of Atlanta, Georgia

- Lindridge–Martin Manor Historic District
- U.S. National Register of Historic Places
- U.S. Historic district
- Location within Atlanta
- Location: Approximately bounded by Lindridge Dr. NE, Melante Dr. NE, Cardova Dr. NE, Armand Ct. NE, and Armand Rd. NE
- Coordinates: 33.821146°N 84.357718°W
- Architect: John Wesley Cherry, et al.
- Architectural style: Colonial Revival; Other
- NRHP reference No.: 15000412
- Added to NRHP: July 14, 2015

Lindridge/Martin Manor is an intown neighborhood of Atlanta in Fulton County, Georgia. It consists mostly of the single-family homes located off Lindbergh Drive in between I-85 and Cheshire Bridge Road. In addition, it includes a small commercial area of three streets west of I-85 bounded by Peachtree Creek, Piedmont Road and the Southern railroad. The neighborhood's boundaries are I-85 on the northwest (except for the small area across I-85), Morningside-Lenox Park on the south, and North Druid Hills in unincorporated DeKalb County, Georgia on the east.

The neighborhood was added to the National Register of Historic Places in July 2015, as a result of a 2014 agreement between the Georgia Department of Transportation and local residents who were unhappy with the construction of a flyover at the Georgia 400/I-85 interchange.

== Government ==
The neighborhood is part of Neighborhood planning unit F. The neighborhood association is the Lindridge/Martin Manor Neighborhood Association (LMMNA). The LMMNA participates together with the neighboring North Druid Hills communities of LaVista Park and Woodland Hills in the Lindbergh LaVista Corridor Coalition (LLCC).

== Issues ==
In 2011, issues facing Lindridge/Martin Manor included:

- the planned Clifton Corridor transit line which passes through the neighborhood on its route from Lindbergh to Emory University
- traffic congestion in particular at the intersection of Cheshire Bridge Road and Lindbergh Road/LaVista Road

== See also ==
- National Register of Historic Places listings in Fulton County, Georgia
