= Berkeley Park, Atlanta =

Neighborhood of Atlanta, Georgia

Coordinates: 33.797805°N 84.411227°W

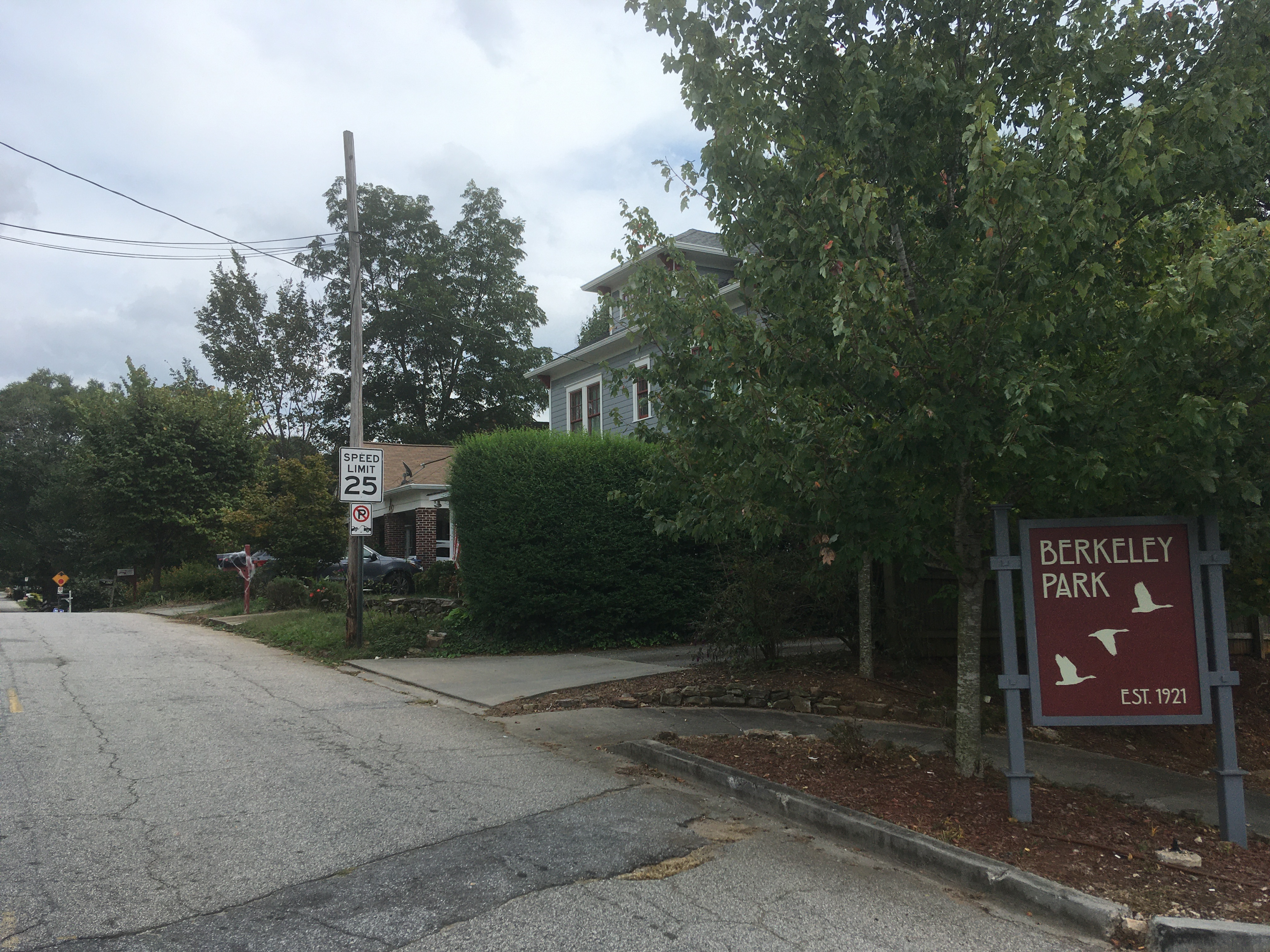

Berkeley Park is a neighborhood located in West Midtown Atlanta, Georgia, United States.

Berkeley Park was established in 1921, and for a time was considered a part of Underwood Hills. In 1996, Berkeley Park was again recognized as an official neighborhood in the city of Atlanta. The neighborhood boundaries of Berkeley Park are I-75 to the north, Northside Drive on the east, Howell Mill Road to the west and 17th Street to the south.

Some or all of the Berkeley Park area is listed as Berkeley Park Historic District on the National Register of Historic Places.
