= PATH400 =

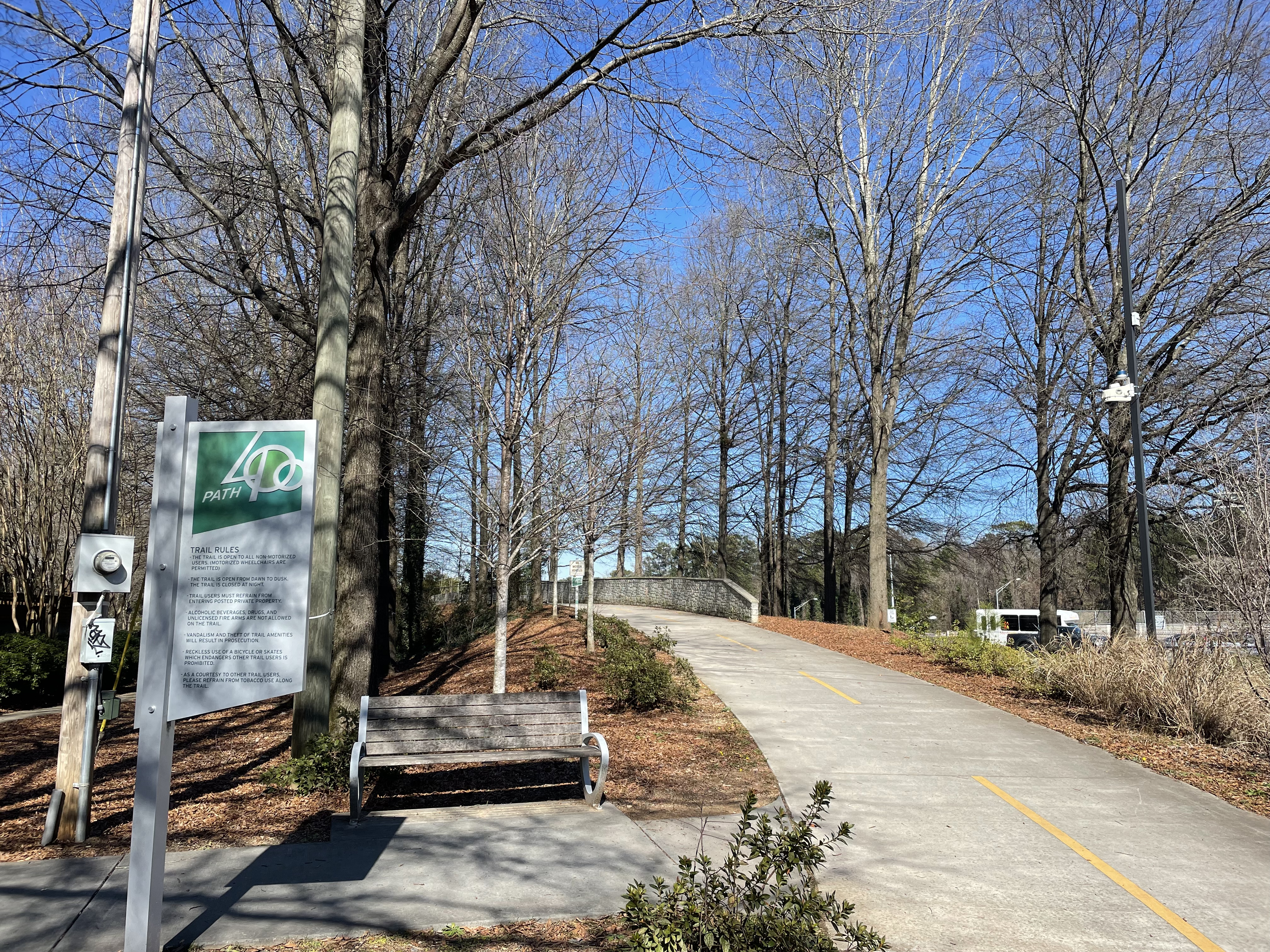
- Southern terminus of PATH400 at Lenox Road
- Length: 5.2 miles (8.4 km)
- Location: Atlanta, Georgia, USA
- Established: January 9, 2014; 12 years ago
- Trailheads: Dunwoody (north) to; Atlanta Beltline (south)
- Use: Cycling and pedestrians
- Season: Year round
- Surface: Asphalt
- Website: www.path400greenway.org

PATH400 is a multi-use trail under construction along the Georgia 400 freeway in Buckhead, Atlanta. Once complete, the trail will be approximately 5.2 miles (8.4 km) long, extending from Loridans Drive in Dunwoody, Georgia south to the Atlanta BeltLine’s Peachtree Creek spur trail. The trail will be 10–14 feet (3.0–4.3 m) wide and traverse the neighborhoods of North Buckhead, Peachtree Park and Lindmont LaVista. It is intended to be the "spine of Buckhead’s Trails and Greenways Subsystem, part of the Buckhead Collection, connecting parks, trails, schools and neighborhoods to the urban core of Buckhead and ultimately to the Atlanta BeltLine."

The PATH400 Trail is a partnership between Buckhead CID, Livable Buckhead and the PATH Foundation, and is estimated to cost $10 million. City and Federal funding of $12.66 million was approved at the end of 2017.

== Future expansion ==
=== Buckhead ===
In October 2019, the HUB404 Conservancy began fundraising to build a 9-acre park atop the Georgia State Route 400 to connect the PATH400 trail with Lenox Road and the MARTA Buckhead station. As of 2023, the Buckhead CID is continuing to secure public funds for the estimated $270 million project.

=== Dunwoody ===
Additional plans include connecting Dunwoody to the multi-use trail, with connections to trail networks along Peachtree Dunwoody Road, Hammon Drive, and Mount Vernon Highways.

=== Sandy Springs ===
On October 25, 2017, consultants presented early plans for an extension of the PATH400 to the city of Sandy Springs. In May 2024, Sandy Springs awarded a $20.1 million contract to extend the trail by 2.3 miles, to be built in two segments. The second segment which spans .5 miles (0.80 km) and is estimated to cost $15 million, remains unfunded.

=== Roswell ===
According to a staff memo to the council, Roswell is working with Sandy Springs to jointly submit support packages to GDOT. The city of Roswell has been considering expanding the trail northward to Roswell.

== Art ==
Colorful crosswalks and Star Wars themed chalk art have been displayed on the greenway.

== See also ==
- 10-Minute Walk
- Cycling infrastructure
- Smart Growth
- Walkability
