= Buckhead Business Association =

The Buckhead Business Association (BBA), founded in 1951, is a non-profit association in Atlanta that strives to create an informed business community in Buckhead. A group of independent Buckhead merchants founded the association.

According to the organization’s mission statement, the BBA provides “a positive and informed business environment for its members to achieve cultural, civic, social, economic, and business goals, and actively contribute to the vitality of the greater Buckhead community.” In the 1980s, the organization publicly supported an extension of Georgia State Route 400 through the Buckhead Community. The BBA bussed supporters to community meetings about the highway extension.

As of 2011, the organization had more than 600 members.
