= Henry Irby =

American settler and founder of Buckhead, Atlanta

- Born: January 26, 1807; York County, South Carolina U.S.
- Died: February 20, 1879 (aged 72); Buckhead, Atlanta, Georgia, U.S.
- Occupations: Farmer; Innkeeper
- Known for: Founder of Buckhead, Atlanta
- Spouse: Sardis Walraven
- Children: 2

Henry Irby (January 26, 1807 – February 20, 1879) was an American landowner and entrepreneur credited with founding the settlement that developed into Buckhead, a prominent neighborhood in Atlanta, Georgia. In 1838, he purchased property at a rural junction north of the city, established an inn and general store, and is traditionally associated with the origin of the name “Buckhead.”

== Biography ==
Henry Irby was born on January 26, 1807, in York County, South Carolina. In 1833, he married Sardis Walraven, and the couple had two sons. He relocated to Georgia in the 1830s during a period of expanding settlement. On December 18, 1838, Irby acquired 202½ acres at the current junction of Peachtree, Roswell, and West Paces Ferry Roads for $650. Soon afterward, he opened a combined inn and store, which became a central hub for commerce and community life, functioning as a marketplace for goods and a town square for gatherings. Irby retained ownership of the property and continued his business activities until his death on February 20, 1879.

== Origin of the name “Buckhead” ==
Local tradition holds that the name “Buckhead” originated when a hunter killed a large deer near Irby’s inn and displayed its head on a post or tree, creating a landmark for travelers and residents. Some accounts credit Irby with slaying the buck himself, while others attribute it to a neighboring hunter. The area gradually became known as “Buck’s Head,” which was later shortened to “Buckhead.”

== Legacy ==
Irby’s land acquisition and establishment of his inn and store were instrumental in transforming the location from a sparsely populated junction into a recognized settlement. The business acted as a marketplace and town square, supplying provisions and serving as a hub for residents and travelers. His name is commemorated in local geography, most notably through Irby Avenue, which passes through the Buckhead neighborhood near the site of his original property. In the 21st century, a residential high-rise called "The Irby" was developed at 65 Irby Avenue NW and honors him as the earliest documented settler and founder of the district. Buckhead has since grown into one of Atlanta’s leading residential, commercial, and cultural districts, with its origins tracing back to Irby’s 19th-century enterprises.
