= Margaret Mitchell (Atlanta neighborhood) =

Neighborhood of Atlanta, Georgia

Coordinates: 33.834594°N 84.435972°W

Margaret Mitchell is a neighborhood in the Buckhead Community, in the northwest part of the city of Atlanta, Georgia. It is bounded by Moores Mill Road on the south, I-75 on the east, and the Paces neighborhood on the west.

== History ==
The neighborhood was developed in the 1950s and was originally called Cherokee Forest.

== Neighborhood ==
Margaret Mitchell is mostly residential. Much of the northern part of the neighborhood is taken up by the Westminster Schools' campus.

== Government ==
Margaret Mitchell is part of NPU A.
