= List of diplomatic missions in Atlanta =

This is a list of diplomatic missions in Atlanta. Atlanta is home to 26 diplomatic missions, the seventh-highest concentration of diplomatic missions in the U.S. The following are countries which have established a resident consular presence in Atlanta. For other diplomatic missions in the United States, see list of diplomatic missions in the United States.

== Consulates ==
Country	Mission/Headed by	Address	Neighborhood
Argentina	Juan Manuel Navarro, Consul-General	245 Peachtree Center Avenue, Suite 2101	Peachtree Center
Bahamas	Anthony Donald Edward Moss, Consul-General	2970 Clairmont Road, Suite 690	Brookhaven
Belgium	Michel Gerebtzoff, Consul-General	230 Peachtree Street NW, Suite 2710	Peachtree Center
Brazil	Luis Claudio Villafane Gomes Santos, Consul-General	3500 Lenox Road, Suite 800	Buckhead
Canada	Rosaline Kwan, Consul-General	100 Colony Square, Suite 1700	Midtown
Colombia	Adriana Arias Castiblanco, Consul General	1117 Perimeter Center W Suite N401	Sandy Springs
Costa Rica	Karina Guardia Schoenfeld, Consul General	1870 The Exchange, Suite 100	Cumberland
Ecuador	Juan Veintimilla, Consul-General	3495 Piedmont Road, Building 12, Suite 105	Buckhead
El Salvador	Monica Altagracia Marin Cruz, Consul-General	6735 Peachtree Industrial Boulevard, Suite 150	Sandy Springs
France	Anne-Laure Desjonquères, Consul-General	3399 Peachtree Road NE, Suite 500	Buckhead
Germany	Melanie Moltmann, Consul-General	285 Peachtree Center Avenue NE, Marquis Two Tower, Suite 901	Peachtree Center
Greece	Theodoros Dimopoulos, Consul	3340 Peachtree Road NE, Suite 1670	Buckhead
Guatemala	Telma Leonor Borrayo Cabrera, Consul-General	192 Technology Parkway, Suite 150	Peachtree Corners
Haiti	Marie Orlyne Colas Rene, Consul-General	2911 Piedmont Road NE, Suite F	Buckhead
Honduras	Ada Evila Serrano Nunez, Consul General	2750 Buford Highway NE	Peachtree Corners
India	Swati Kulkarni, Consul-General	5549 Glenridge Drive NE	Sandy Springs
Ireland	Caoimhe Ní Chonchúir, Consul-General	3414 Peachtree Road NE, Suite 260	Buckhead
Israel	Anat Sultan-Dadon, Consul-General	1100 Spring Street NW, Suite 440	Midtown
Japan	Mio Maeda, Consul-General	3438 Peachtree Road NE, Phipps Tower Suite 850	Buckhead
South Korea	Sangpyo Suh, Consul-General	229 Peachtree Street NE, International Tower, Suite 2100	Peachtree Center
Mexico	Javier Diaz De Leon, Consul-General	1700 Chantilly Drive	Briarcliff
Netherlands	Jaap Veerman, Consul-General	1075 Peachtree Street NE, Suite 1550	Midtown
Nigeria	Amina Smaila, Consul-General	8060 Roswell Road	Sandy Springs
Peru	Jaime Sparks de las Casas, Consul-General	4360 Chamblee Dunwoody Road, Suite 580	Dunwoody
Switzerland	Urs Broennimann, Consul-General	1349 West Peachtree Street NE, Suite 1000	Midtown
United Kingdom	Rachel Galloway, Consul-General	133 Peachtree Street NE, Georgia-Pacific Tower, Suite 3400	Downtown

== Honorary consulates ==
- Barbados
- Belize
- Bolivia (vacant)
- Botswana (vacant)
- Chile
- Cyprus
- Czech Republic
- Estonia
- Finland
- Georgia
- Hungary
- Iceland
- Italy
- Jamaica
- Liberia
- Latvia
- Lithuania
- Mali
- Malta
- Mongolia (vacant)
- Netherlands
- New Zealand
- Nicaragua
- Philippines
- Poland
- Romania
- Sao Tome and Principe
- Senegal
- Sierra Leone
- Slovenia
- Sri Lanka (vacant)
- St. Kitts and Nevis
- Sweden
- Tanzania
- Thailand
- Turkey
- Uganda
- Ukraine
- Uzbekistan

== Representative office ==
- Taiwan, Economic and Cultural Office

== See also ==
- List of diplomatic missions of the United States
- List of diplomatic missions in the United States
