= Atlanta Speech School =

School in Atlanta, Georgia, United States

Location
- 3160 Northside Parkway, NW; Atlanta, Fulton County, Georgia 30327; United States; 33°50′28.96″N 84°25′19.73″W

Information
- School type: Private
- Founded: 1938
- Founder: Katherine "Kitty" Hamm
- Head of school: J. Comer Yates
- Accreditations: SACS/SAIS Georgia Accrediting Commission (GAC)
- Website: atlantaspeechschool.org

The Atlanta Speech School is a comprehensive language-based school in Atlanta, Georgia, founded in 1938. Its educational programs focus on literacy and language development, guided by the principle that literacy is a fundamental human right. The school’s Rollins Center for Language and Literacy advances this mission through professional development for educators in partner schools and preschools, as well as through Cox Campus, a free online learning platform offering coursework for educators, healthcare professionals, and community leaders supporting children from birth through age eight.

The four schools of the Atlanta Speech School are its elementary school for children with dyslexia, the Wardlaw School, as well as its three preschools, Katherine Hamm Center, Stepping Stones Preschool, and the Anne and Jim Kenan Preschool. The school's Learning Hub provides services in speech and language pathology, occupational therapy, audiology and academic instruction and intervention. These year-round academic and clinical services are available to the broader community, beyond enrollees of the school's four programs.

The Atlanta Speech School is accredited by the Southeast Association of Independent Schools.

== Wardlaw School ==
The Wardlaw School enrolls elementary-aged students with dyslexia. Using a collaborative teaching model, instructors provide individualized academic intervention and instruction tailored to each student’s language-based learning needs. The program is designed as a short-term educational placement, with the goal of preparing students to transition successfully to general education settings.

The Katherine Hamm Center offers auditory-verbal education for children ages 0 to 5 who are deaf or hard of hearing. The goal of auditory-verbal programs is to enable students to communicate using listening and oral language. Students enrolled in the Katherine Hamm Center use assisted listening devices such as cochlear implants and hearing aids and are prepared for mainstream classroom environments. The majority of students leaving the Hamm Center are mainstreamed into regular public and independent schools. The Katherine Hamm center is licensed by Bright from the Start, and is a member of OPTION schools.

== Stepping Stones ==
Stepping Stones Preschool is an integrated early childhood program serving children ages three to four with speech and language–related delays. Stepping Stones combines language-based instruction, speech-language intervention, and multisensory learning to address individual learning needs. Instruction is delivered by interdisciplinary teams that include a speech-language pathologist, learning disability specialist, occupational therapist, and teaching assistant. Stepping Stones Preschool is licensed by Bright from the Start.

== Anne and Jim Kenan Preschool ==
The Anne and Jim Kenan Preschool is an inclusive early childhood education program serving children ages two to five. Kenan was established more than fifty years ago to support the transition of students from the Atlanta Speech School’s Katherine Hamm Center who are deaf or hard of hearing into general education preschool and elementary settings. The program emphasizes spoken language development through an oral language–based instructional approach.

== Clinical and community programs ==
The Atlanta Speech School's Learning Hub provides communication and literacy education, serving clients ranging in age from infancy to late adulthood, including members of the metro Atlanta and the state of Georgia community, as well as Atlanta Speech School students.

=== Learning Hub ===
The Atlanta Speech School's Learning Hub provides evaluation and therapy for children and adults with speech, language, learning, and hearing challenges. The Hub, through its partnership with PENTA, serves as a referral source for Georgia's Universal Newborn Hearing Screening program and dispenses hearing aids for infants. Therapists in the clinic also provide services for area independent schools.

Therapy is available to treat persons with speech or language difficulties related to the following:

- Accent
- Aphasia
- Apraxia of Speech
- Articulation Disorders
- Auditory Processing Disorders
- Aural Habilitation/Auditory Training
- Cleft Palate
- Hearing Loss
- Phonological Disorders
- Phonological Processing Skills
- Spoken and Written Language Delays
- Stuttering
- Voice Disorders
- Word Retrieval/ Word Finding Difficulties

Services Provided:

- Diagnostic testing, evaluation and remediation
- Hearing evaluations, aural rehabilitation guidance
- Auditory Processing Disorder (APD) testing
- Hearing aid dispensing, programming and service
- Non-medical support prior to and following cochlear implantation

=== Occupational Therapy Services ===
The Hub's Occupational Therapy services support children who experience difficulties in sensory integration, gross and fine motor coordination, visual-motor and handwriting skills, visual perception, independent self care, and feeding skills.

Services Provided:

- Diagnostic evaluations
- Intervention services
- Parent/teacher consultation

=== Academic Services ===
The Hub offers individual intervention and tutoring for students age four through college-age needing assistance to achieve academic success. Educators use formal (standardized achievement) and non-formal (teacher-developed) assessment data to monitor progress. Upon request, instructors may consult with the student's teacher(s) or other professionals.

Academic Areas Served:

- Reading (decoding, comprehension, fluency)
- Written expression
- Language abilities
- Mathematics
- Organizational/Study skills

=== Rollins Center for Language & Literacy ===
The Rollins Center for Language & Literacy is the professional development arm of the Atlanta Speech School, focused on improving early language and literacy outcomes for children from birth through age eight. The Rollins Center partners with schools and early childhood programs to provide evidence-based training and coaching for educators and school leaders—individuals, whole schools and districts. Rollins efforts emphasize language-centered instruction, teacher-student relationships, early literacy development, and the application of research-informed practices in classroom settings. The Rollins Center scales its work through its Cox Campus, a free online learning platform offering coursework for educators, healthcare professionals, and community leaders. Cox Campus is funded through philanthropic investment.

== Financial aid ==
The Atlanta Speech School has never turned away a child in need of its services due to the family's financial constraints. The Katherine Hamm Center, Stepping Stones and Wardlaw scholarships are made possible by donors, including the fundraising efforts of the Atlanta Speech School Guild.
