= Underwood Hills, Atlanta =

Neighborhood of Atlanta, Georgia

Coordinates: 33.799°N 84.416°W

Underwood Hills is a neighborhood in Buckhead, Atlanta, Georgia, United States.

== History ==
The neighborhood was founded in 1902, when it was dubbed Northside Park, but construction in the area, in what at that point was the edge of the city, did not pick up steam until the 1920s. Many residents then were employed by the nearby Seaboard Coast Line Railroad. Building in the neighborhood continued through the post-World War II boom period. By the 1960s, construction of Interstate 75 through northwest Atlanta had removed some houses and turned the area into a residential island surrounded by the highway and major commercial corridors.
