= Buckhead Village =

Neighborhood of Atlanta, Georgia, United States

Coordinates: 33.83942°N 84.379869°W

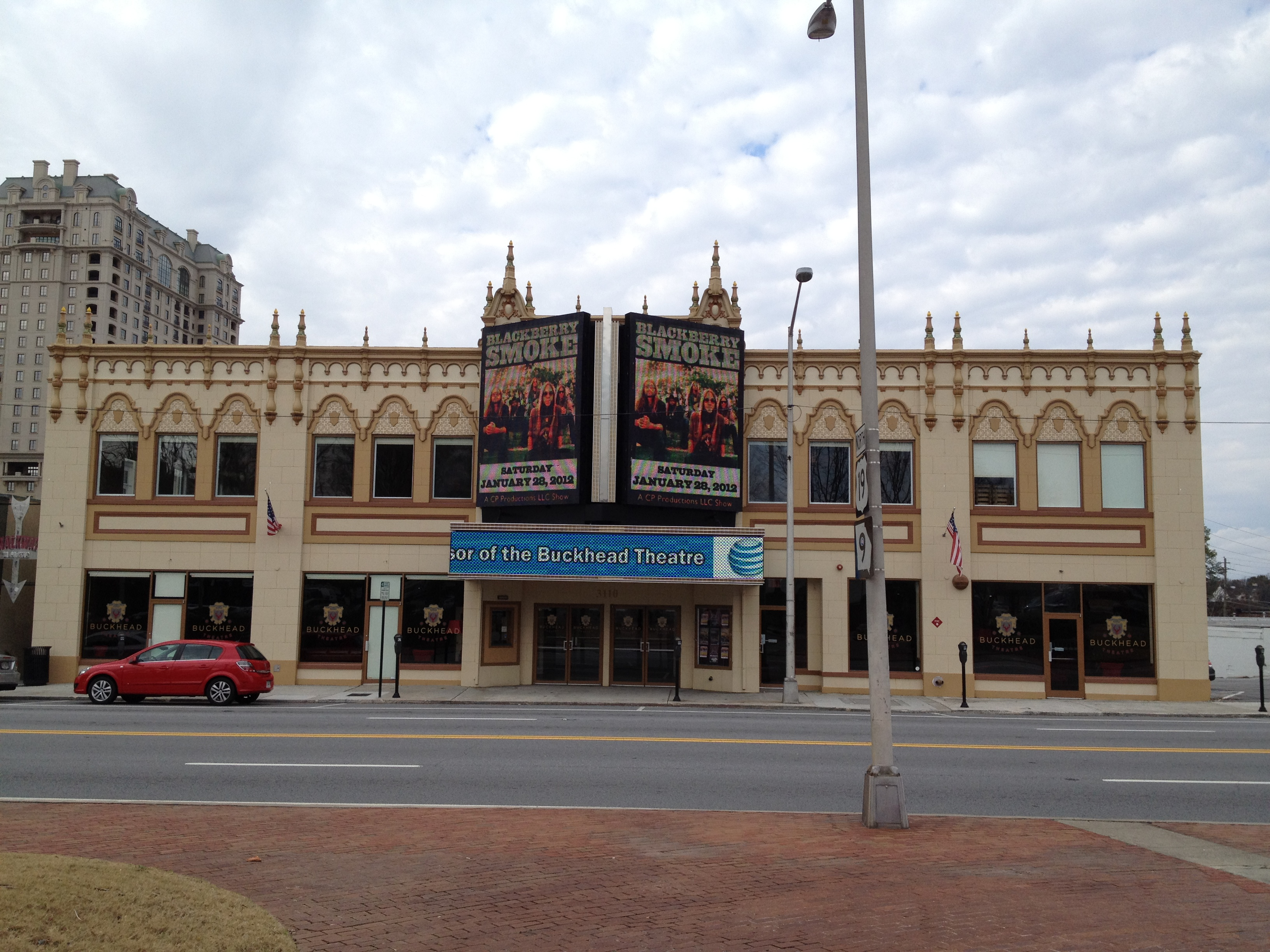
Buckhead Theatre

Buckhead Village is a neighborhood of Atlanta, Georgia, one of 42 neighborhoods in the larger Buckhead district and the community's historic business section. The Village is defined by the city as the area between Piedmont Road, Peachtree Road, and Pharr Road.

== Shopping ==
Alice + Olivia, Billy Reid, Bonobos, Brochu Walker, COS, Todd Patrick, Diptyque, Rails, Brown & Co Jewelers, jenni kayne, Le Labo, Vuori, Patek Philippe, rag & bone, Theory, Todd Snyder, Warby Parker, and Veronica Beard among others have physical retail spaces in Buckhead Village.

== Food & Beverage ==
Buckhead Village offers a number of food and beverage options including; Boba Craze, Brush Sushi, Carmel, Fadó Irish Pub & Restaurant, Fetch Park, Gypsy Kitchen, Le Bilboquet, Le Colonial, Saint Germain, Shake Shack, Taverna, The Southern Gentleman and Yeppa.

== Wellness ==
In addition to shopping and dining, BVD offers a number of wellness options; Barry's Bootcamp, F45 Training, FACED Facial Studio, Highland Yoga, Nail Muse, Savant Salon, Tend Dental, The Daily Pilates.

== History ==
In 1838, Henry Irby purchased 202.5 acres surrounding what is now Buckhead Village from Daniel Johnson for $650. Irby subsequently established a general store and tavern at the northwest corner of the Peachtree/Roswell/Paces Ferry intersection. The name "Buckhead" comes from a story that Irby killed a large buck deer and placed the head in a prominent location. Prior to this, the settlement had been called "Irbyville."

The surrounding area, which is now the larger Buckhead community, remained dominated by country estates until after World War I, when many of Atlanta's wealthy began building mansions among the area's rolling hills. The area that is now the Buckhead district was annexed by Atlanta in 1952, following an earlier attempt by Mayor William B. Hartsfield in 1946 that was voted down by residents. In 1956, an estate known as Joyeuse was chosen as the site for a major shopping center to be known as Lenox Square, starting the development of Peachtree Road as a major commercial, financial, and high-rise residential corridor.

To reverse a downturn in the Village during the 1980s, minimum parking spot requirements for bars were lifted, which quickly led to it becoming the most dense concentration of bars and clubs in the city. These establishments included BAR, World Bar, Lulu's Bait Shack, Mako's, Clarence Foster's, Tongue & Groove, Chaos and John Harvard's Brew House. By 1996, Buckhead Village nightlife was comparable to "Mardi Gras, complete with nightly arrests, puking in the streets and [drunk] college girls."

In the late 1990s illegal cruising on Peachtree Road became rampant, making crime harder to spot and the shortage of police officers more apparent. Violent crime increased, culminating with two murders on Super Bowl Sunday in 2000. Baltimore Ravens football player Ray Lewis was implicated in the murders which occurred after he left the Cobalt Club at 265 East Paces Ferry Road. Lewis pleaded guilty to misdemeanor obstructing justice charges and his two co-defendants were found not guilty.

Buckhead Alliance founder Robin Loudermilk claimed that there were at least ten murders during this period related to the nightlife in the Village. Beginning in 2000, residents sought to ameliorate this situation by taking measures to reduce the community's nightlife and re-establish a more residential character. The Buckhead Coalition and councilwoman Mary Norwood were instrumental in persuading the Atlanta City Council to pass an ordinance to close bars at 2:30 a.m., rather than 4 a.m., and liquor licenses were made more difficult to obtain. Eventually, most of the Buckhead Village nightlife area was acquired for the Streets of Buckhead multi-use project and many of the former bars and clubs were torn down in 2007.

== Charlie Loudermilk Park ==
In the triangle formed by Peachtree Road, and Roswell Road, is a pocket park known as Charlie Loudermilk Park, having been renamed from Triangle Park in 2009.

== Community organizations ==
The key organizations organizing neighborhoods businesses and residents and working for improvements are the Buckhead Community Improvement District (CID), the Buckhead Area Transportation Management Association (BATMA), the Buckhead Business Association (BBA) and Neighborhood Planning Unit (NPU) B. These organizations backed a new zoning ordinance that the Atlanta City Council adopted on October 4, 2010 that expanded the SPI-9 zoning area from a small area immediately around and southwest of the intersection of Peachtree and Paces Ferry, to cover a much larger commercial area west of Piedmont Ave. and north of Pharr Rd. The stated aim of the community organizations is to create in the Village a "walkable, urban community enriched with public art and parks, wide sidewalks, greenspace, transportation options, and outdoor dining, all designed to have international appeal." As of May 2011, there are plans for a $4 million streetscape program aims to improve the experience for pedestrians in the Village. The program is funded by private donations, CID funding, and a grant from the Woodruff Foundation. While the Streets of Buckhead project went on hold, other developments were moving forward around Peachtree Rd. and Roswell Rd, and so the CID will first improve pedestrian amenities around that area. Completion is targeted for mid-2012.
