= North Buckhead =

Human settlement in Atlanta, Georgia, United States of America

Coordinates: 33.865252°N 84.368863°W

North Buckhead is a neighborhood in the Buckhead district, at the northern edge of the city of Atlanta, Georgia, and is one of Atlanta's most affluent neighborhoods.

With a population of 8,270 (2010 census), it is also Atlanta's fourth most populous neighborhood, after Downtown, Midtown, and the Old Fourth Ward.

== Boundaries ==
It is bounded by:

- the city of Sandy Springs on the north
- Peachtree-Dunwoody Road the Brookhaven neighborhood of the city of Atlanta on the east
- the neighborhoods of Buckhead Forest, Lenox, and Peachtree Park on the south
- Roswell Road and the East Chastain Park neighborhood on the west

== History ==
The area contains Lakemoore (still standing on Emma Lane), the home of Wiley L. Moore (b. 1888), president of the Wofford Oil Company of Georgia.

The area became part of the city of Atlanta in 1950 and suburban development took place subsequently.

The Wieuca Inn stood where the Roswell-Wieuca shopping center now stands and was torn down in 1955.

== Government ==
North Buckhead is part of NPU B.
