= Pine Hills, Atlanta =

Neighborhood of Atlanta, Georgia

Coordinates: 33.837°N 84.352°W

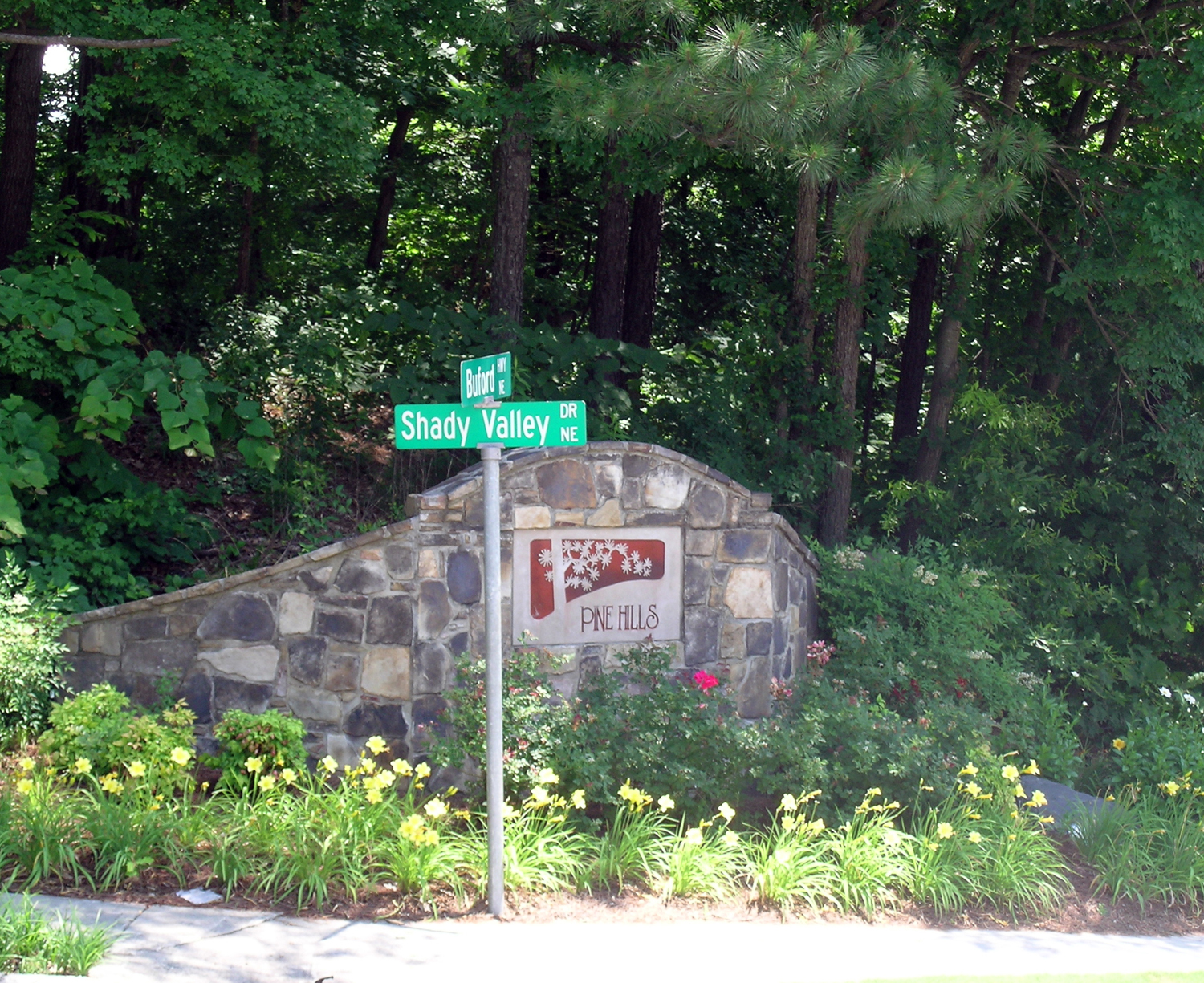
An entrance to Pine Hills

Pine Hills is a neighborhood of Atlanta, Georgia and also part of the Buckhead Community, located in north east Atlanta on the eastern part of Buckhead and southern part of Brookhaven. It is roughly bounded by Buford Highway to the south, the railway (alongside East Paces Ferry Road) to the north, Lenox Road to the west, and East Roxboro Road and Roxboro Road to the east. The western and central section of Pine Hills is in Fulton County and a smaller section to the east is in Dekalb County, east of a north-south line that roughly passes through the intersection of East Roxboro Road, Roxboro Road, and West Roxboro Road. The area includes part of the 30324 and 30329 postal zip codes.

== Geography ==
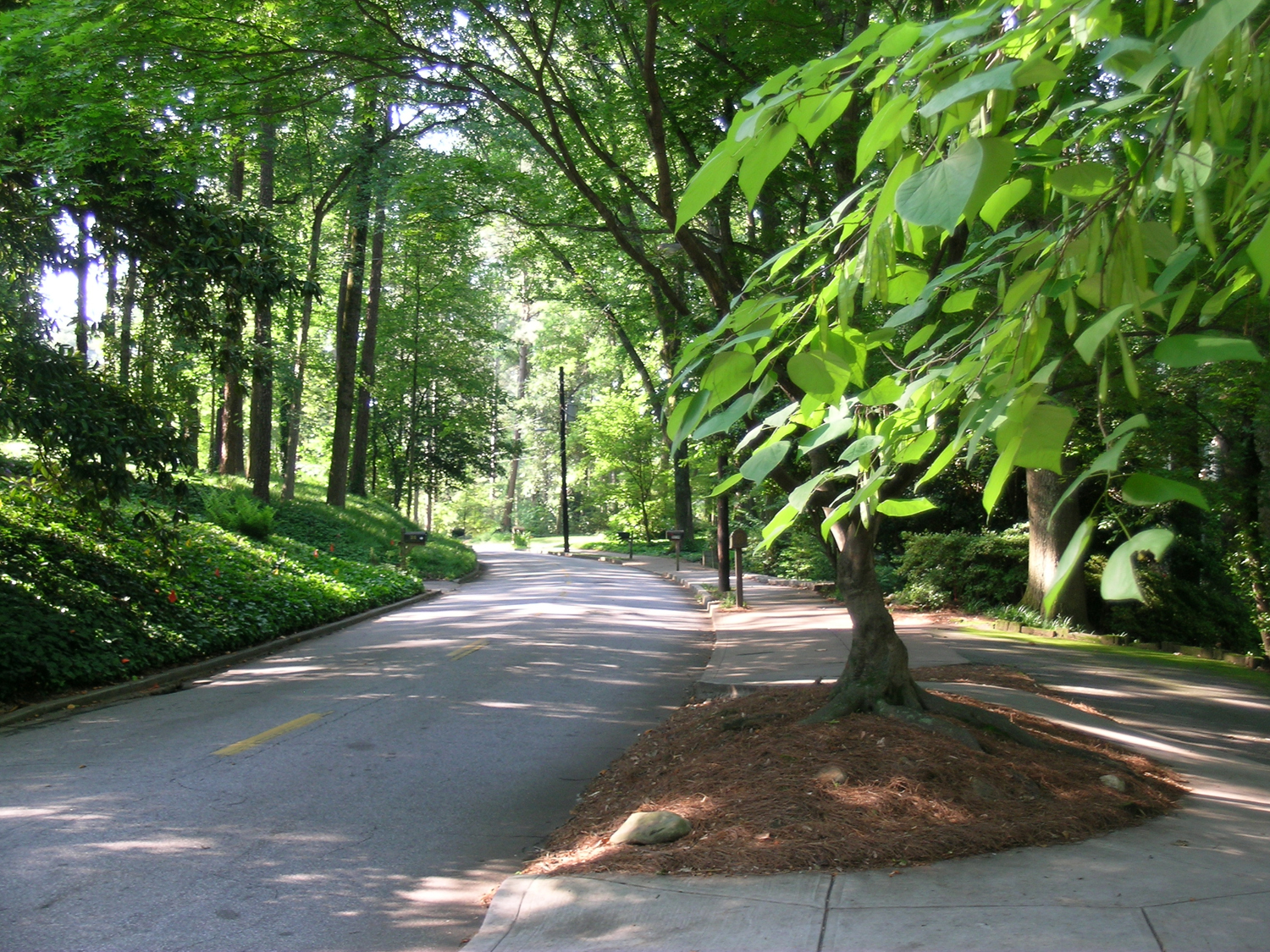
West Roxboro Road

The area has several creeks and small streams. Indian Creek runs south and joins Peachtree Creek (north fork) which runs through the southern edge of the area and is 40' wide at certain points. The area is hilly with some steep roads and driveways. Elevation varies by about 160 feet. The area has abundant plant life and trees such as oak, white and yellow pine, sycamore, beech, gum, poplar, and cherry. The surrounding area is a magnet for an abundant variety of wildlife, such as blue herons, pileated woodpeckers, Canada geese, mallards, kingfishers, beaver, muskrats, and raccoons, as well as occasional otters when the water is high.

== History ==
The Creek Indians lived in the surrounding area and ceded their claim to the lands in this area in the early 19th century. The land was surveyed and split into counties and districts. In 1821 the land lots were distributed by lottery. One of the early families lived on the hill east of Shady Valley Park and operated a sawmill on Peachtree Creek between 1857 and 1865. A corn and wheat mill on the north fork of Peachtree Creek was operated between 1885 and about 1910. The area was a quiet farming community until the early 20th century when Atlantans began moving out of the city to country estates, such as Roxborough Springs, the Standard Club (with golf course) and a riding academy in the Canter Road area. Further subdivisions were made in the 1930s. After World War II developers began dividing the rest of the area, building most of the homes that now exist.

== Neighboring amenities ==
This neighborhood contains Shady Valley Park, The Roxboro Valley Swim Club, and the Lenox Square shopping mall is adjacent to the north west corner of Pine Hills. Pine Hills is conveniently located near Interstate 85 and SR 400. Many of the homes in Pine Hills are of the Mid-Century Modern architectural style.

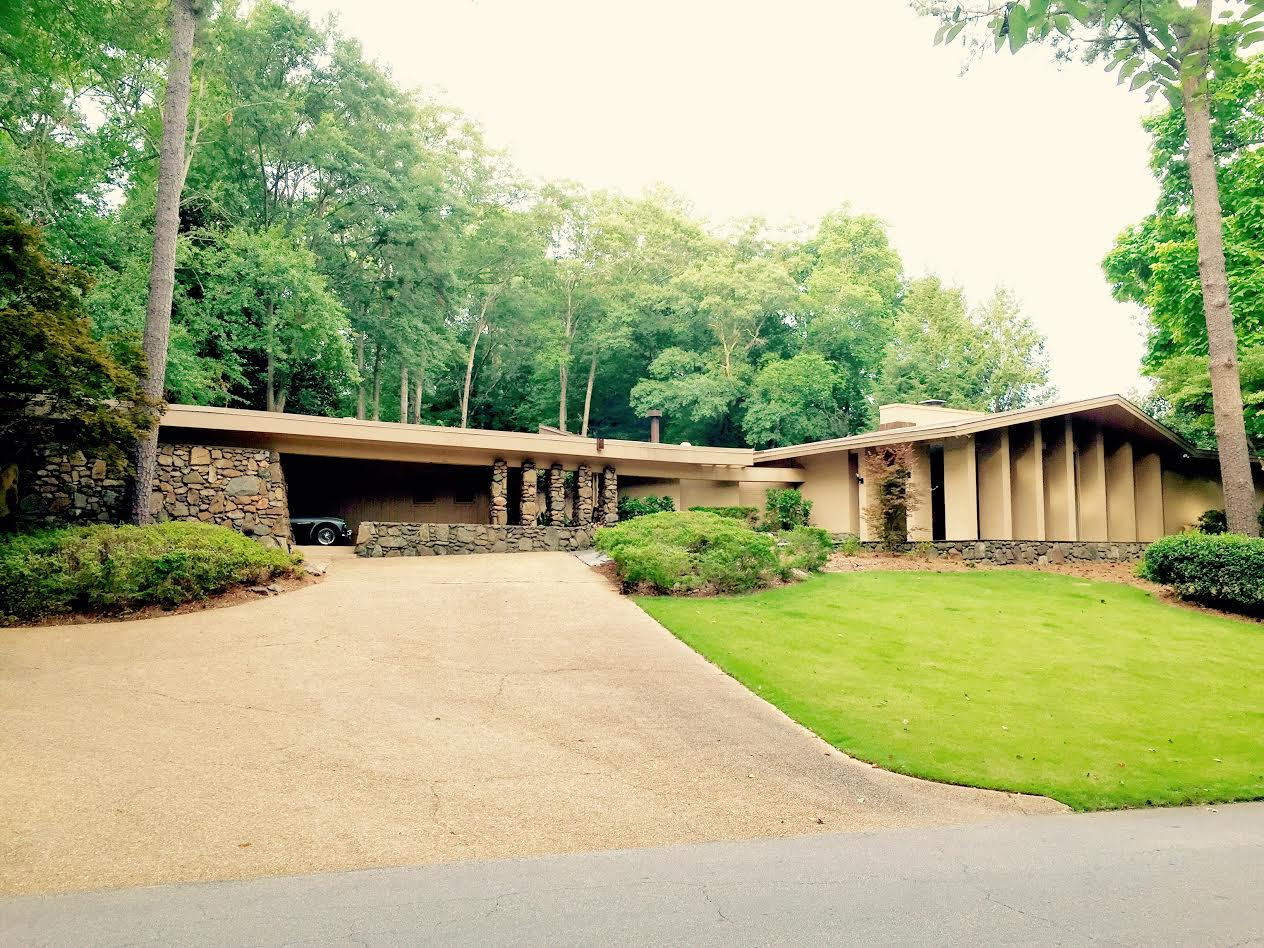
Single family mid-century modern house typical in Pine Hills
