= Excelsior Mill =

This page is intended to help distinguish between locations referred to as "Excelsior Mill" and may refer to:

- Cedarburg Wire and Nail Factory previously known as Excelsior Mill
- The Masquerade (Atlanta) previously known as DuPre Excelsior Mill
