= West Midtown =

Neighborhood of Atlanta, Georgia, US

Coordinates: 33.785917°N 84.411222°W

West Midtown, also known as Westside, is a colloquial area, comprising many historical neighborhoods located in Atlanta, Georgia. Once largely industrial, West Midtown is now the location of urban lofts, art galleries, live music venues, retail and restaurants.

== Nomenclature ==
West Midtown is directly west of Midtown Atlanta, hence that name. The name for the area is a matter of debate. The name "West Midtown" is used by the neighbors' association in Home Park, the largest constituent neighborhood, the West Midtown Business Association, and Westside Provisions, a privately run commercial district. The Atlanta Convention & Visitors Bureau uses West Midtown and defines the Westside as consisting of West Midtown and Atlantic Station.

Only "Westside" or "The Westside" is used by the Not for Tourists guide.

Creative Loafing has used both "West Midtown" and "Westside", but now uses "Westside" in its official neighborhood guide. The West Midtown Design District uses both terms. Google Maps does not mark the area with a neighborhood name.

== Geography ==
The borders of West Midtown are not defined officially by the city, as it encompasses several neighborhoods spread over multiple NPUs. Generally, though, West Midtown is bordered to the east by Midtown Atlanta and to the south by North Avenue. It starts with Georgia Tech on the south. It is bordered to the north by Buckhead, to the west by Marietta Boulevard and Marietta Road, and to the south on Hollowell Parkway. However, other sources define a larger area including parts of English Avenue and Bankhead, including the West Midtown Design District and The West Midtown Business Alliance.

=== Neighborhoods and historic districts ===
Neighborhoods usually included within West Midtown are:

- The western center of Martin Luther King BLVD adjacent to Clark Atlanta University and Marta's Ashby Station
- Adair Park
- Berkeley Park
- Blandtown
- The portion of English Avenue and around King Plow Arts Center
- The western portion of Home Park
- Knight Park/Howell Station
- Loring Heights
- Midtown West
- Marietta Street Artery
- Underwood Hills
- Westside Provisions
- Bolton
- Hills Park
- Riverside

Historic districts within West Midtown are:

- Howell Interlocking Historic District (railyards)
- King Plow/Railroad Historic District (proposed; includes the King Plow Arts Center and the Midtown West and Westside Provisions commercial districts)
- Means Street Historic District
- Southern Railway North Avenue Yards Historic District (now NorthYards business park)

Westside Provisions occupies buildings that include a former meat packing plant and is home to a large Room & Board furniture store, as well as Atlanta's second Anthropologie. The district includes Atlanta's two top Zagat-rated restaurants, Bacchanalia and the Quinones Room, as well as Ormsby's, a popular restaurant and bar featuring bocce ball courts. It also includes a gourmet market with sections for produce, cheese, and a bakery, additional restaurants, and high end home furnishings and apparel shops. The district is said to have "put West Midtown on the map."

== History ==
Much of Atlanta's industrial and Civil War history occurred in the area now known as West Midtown. Several buildings still in use today are located next to the historic Norfolk Southern rail lines General Sherman used when he invaded Atlanta in 1864. In 1881, the International Cotton Exposition was held at the north end of the corridor, for which the Exposition Cotton Mills were built. Mule-pulled trolleys brought workers starting in 1882, and these became electrified in 1894.

The Huff House, which stood on Huff Road, was the oldest house standing in the city when it was demolished in 1954.

Blandtown, located along Huff Road, was one of the first black settlements around Atlanta after the Civil War. The community went into decline in the 1950s, such that by the 1990s, the once-residential neighborhood was rezoned to strictly industrial usage.

The Marietta Street corridor continued as an industrial and warehouse area, though starting in the 1960s, the commercial strip along Marietta Street suffered with suburbanization. In the 1990s, several adaptive reuse projects were initiated (Hasting's Seed Company, The Carriage Works, King Plow Arts Center, and the Allied Warehouse), signaling the renaissance of the area.

== Economy ==
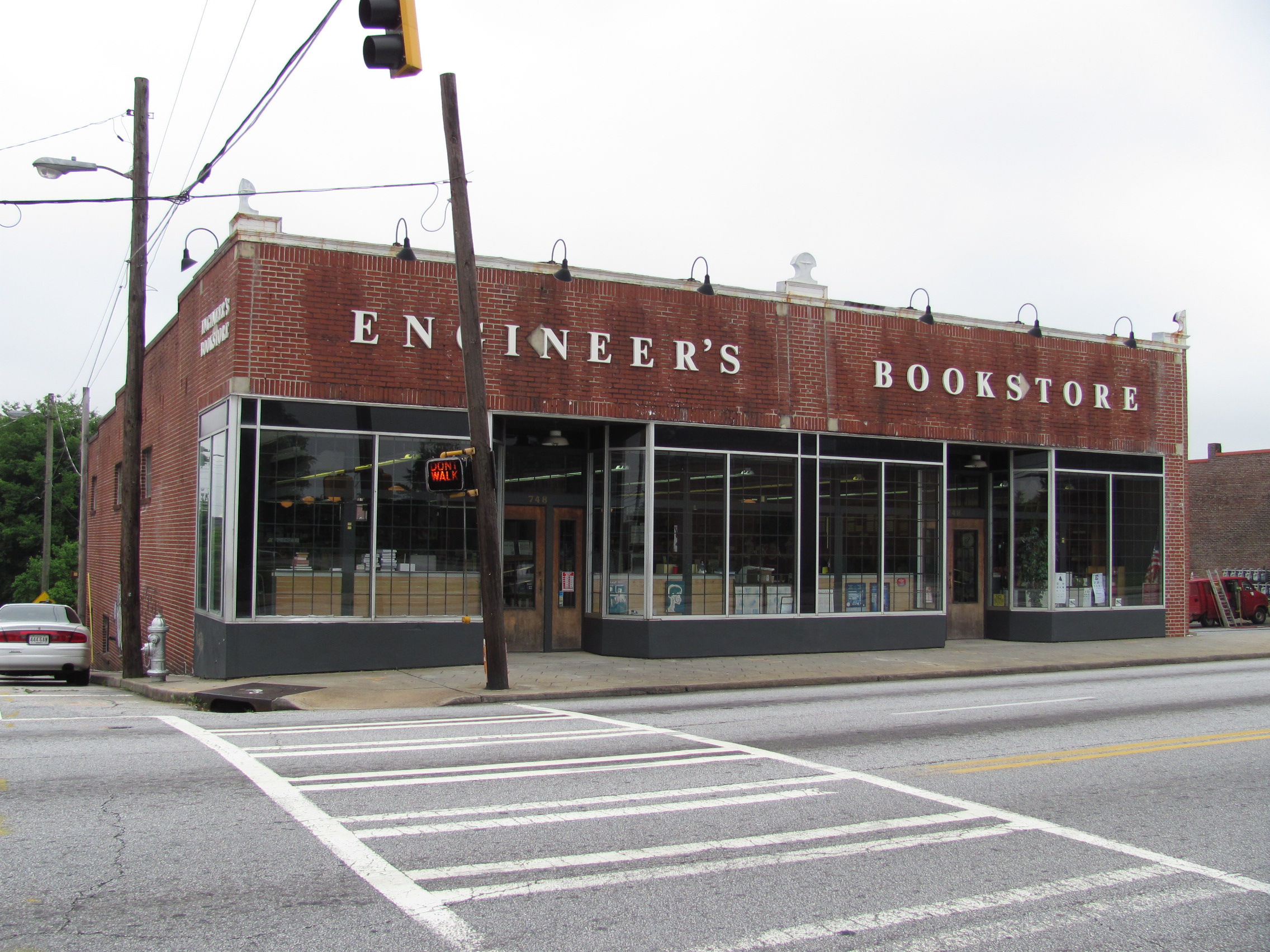
Engineer's Bookstore once served the many Georgia Tech students who inhabit West Midtown. The building has been nominated for inclusion in the Means Street Historic District.

Once a largely abandoned industrial area, West Midtown has seen large amounts of gentrification and infill, with an eclectic mix of new lofts, restaurants, shops, art galleries, salons and professional firms. The loft-style industrial feel of the neighborhood has been retained, as most of the new developments are restorations of once-neglected factories or warehouses that date back to the 1880s. West Midtown has become a popular location for the offices of high-tech companies seeking the open floor plans and loft office space, including the Atlanta offices of Facebook, located at Brickworks.

West Midtown is a popular stop for food lovers due to the fact that some of Atlanta's trendiest high-end restaurants are located in the district. Many of West Midtown's dining establishments have garnered national attention and favor with local foodies such as Bacchanalia, Abattoir, Miller Union, Bocado, and The Optimist, chef Ford Fry's seafood restaurant. In 2012, the Atlanta Food Truck Park opened in West Midtown at Howell Mill Road's intersection with I-75.

West Midtown's retail options, which includes Sid Mashburn, Ann Mashburn, Toscano & Sons Italian Market, Room & Board, Whipstitch Fabrics, Redefined Home, The Gear Revival, Anthropologie, Hop City Craft Beer and Wine, Wired and Fired, Lululemon Athletica, Verde Home and Free People, make the area a regional shopping destination. Huff Road forms a ribbon of wholesale and retail home furnishings stores in addition to residential complexes and restaurants.

== Arts and culture ==
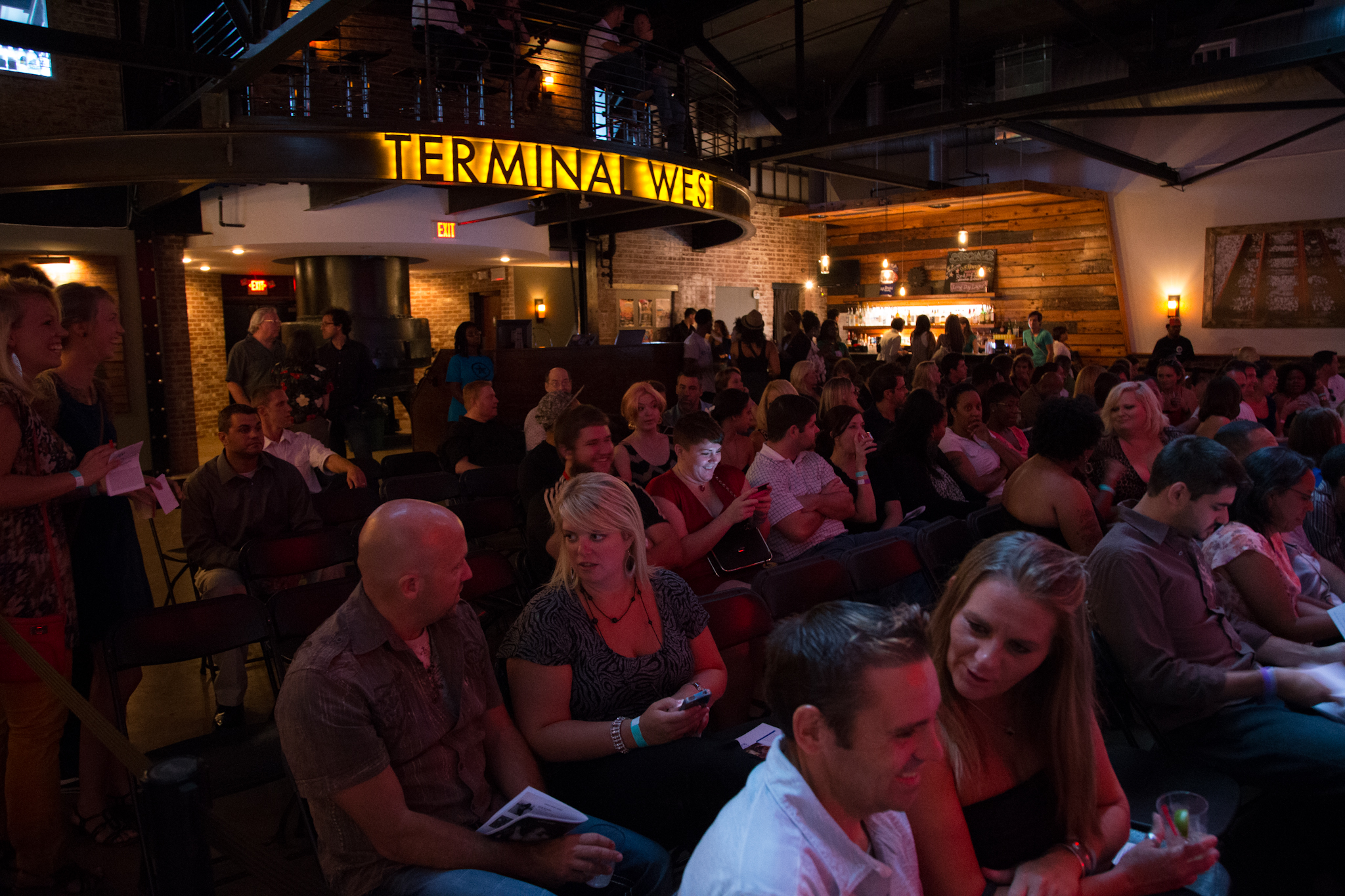
A show at Terminal West

West Midtown has an arts scene that rivals Midtown, Atlanta's premier arts district. However, unlike Midtown, which is focused more on classical art, West Midtown is home to an "ad hoc group of contemporary art galleries that have styled themselves as a more intellectual alternative." Prominent art galleries include Saltworks Gallery, which shows works by both local and international artists; the Sandler Hudson Gallery, which has represented contemporary artists since 1989; the Emily Amy Gallery, known for emerging artists from across the country; and the Jennifer Schwartz Gallery, known for fine art photography with regular rotating exhibitions. These art galleries sponsor a monthly art walk through the neighborhood known as the West Side Arts District Art Walk. the 3rd Saturday of every month.

West Midtown is home to three arts centers: the Goat Farm Arts Center, the Westside Cultural Arts Center and the King Plow Arts Center. Located in the neighborhood is the Atlanta Contemporary Art Center, a non-collecting contemporary art museum.

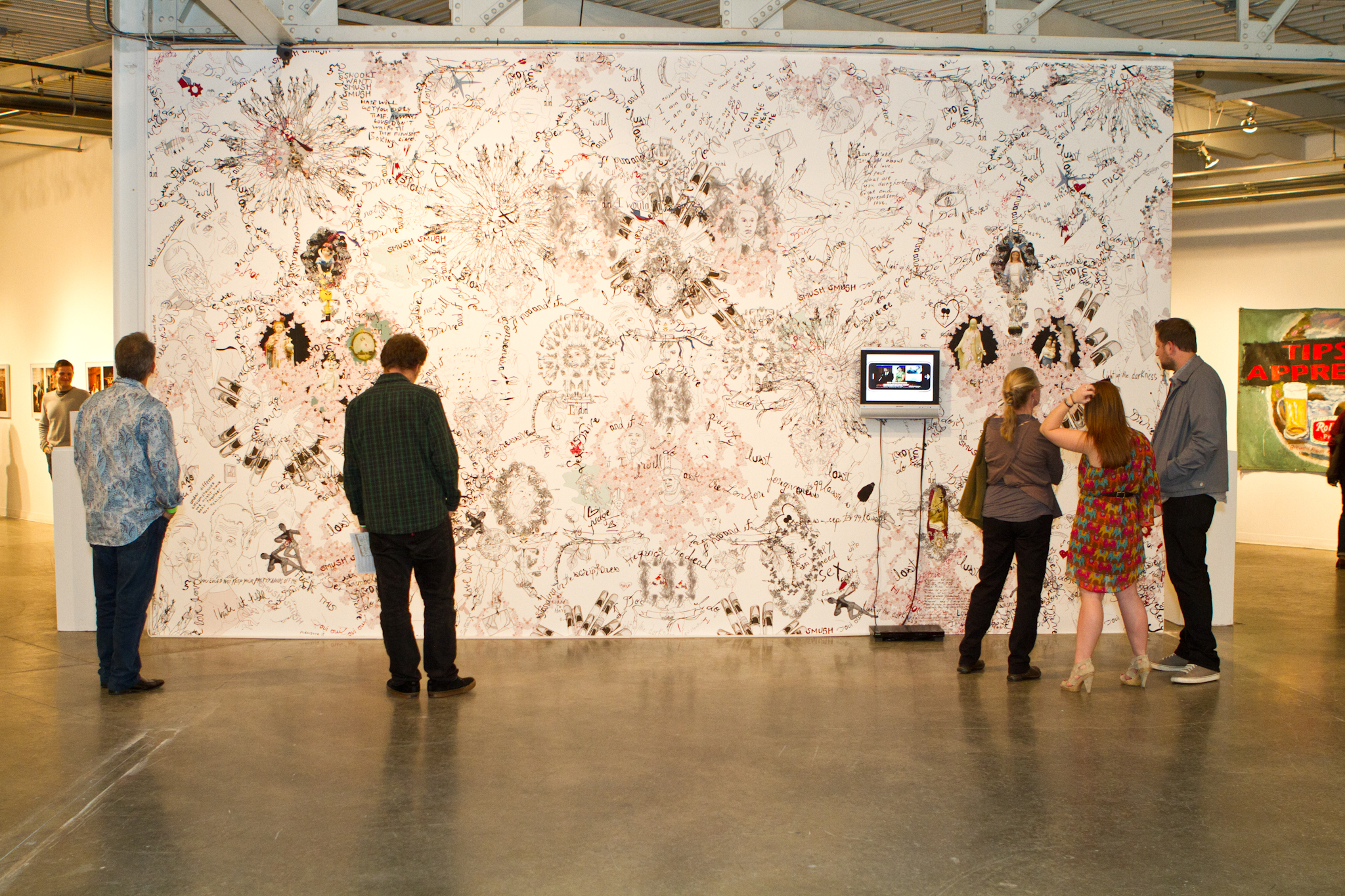
An exhibition at the Atlanta Contemporary Art Center

West Midtown is home to live music venues and drinking establishments. Terminal West, a 7,000-square foot music venue, is located in the King Plow Arts Center, a 100-year-old iron and steel foundry. The venue, which includes an outdoor roof deck overlooking historic train tracks, was recently chosen by Creative Loafing as Best New Music Venue for 2012. The Goat Farm Arts Center hosts music concerts. West Midtown is home to popular nightlife destinations, especially Ormsby's, a bar and restaurant featuring bocce ball courts, and Northside Tavern, a self-described "dive bar" that offers live Blues performances.

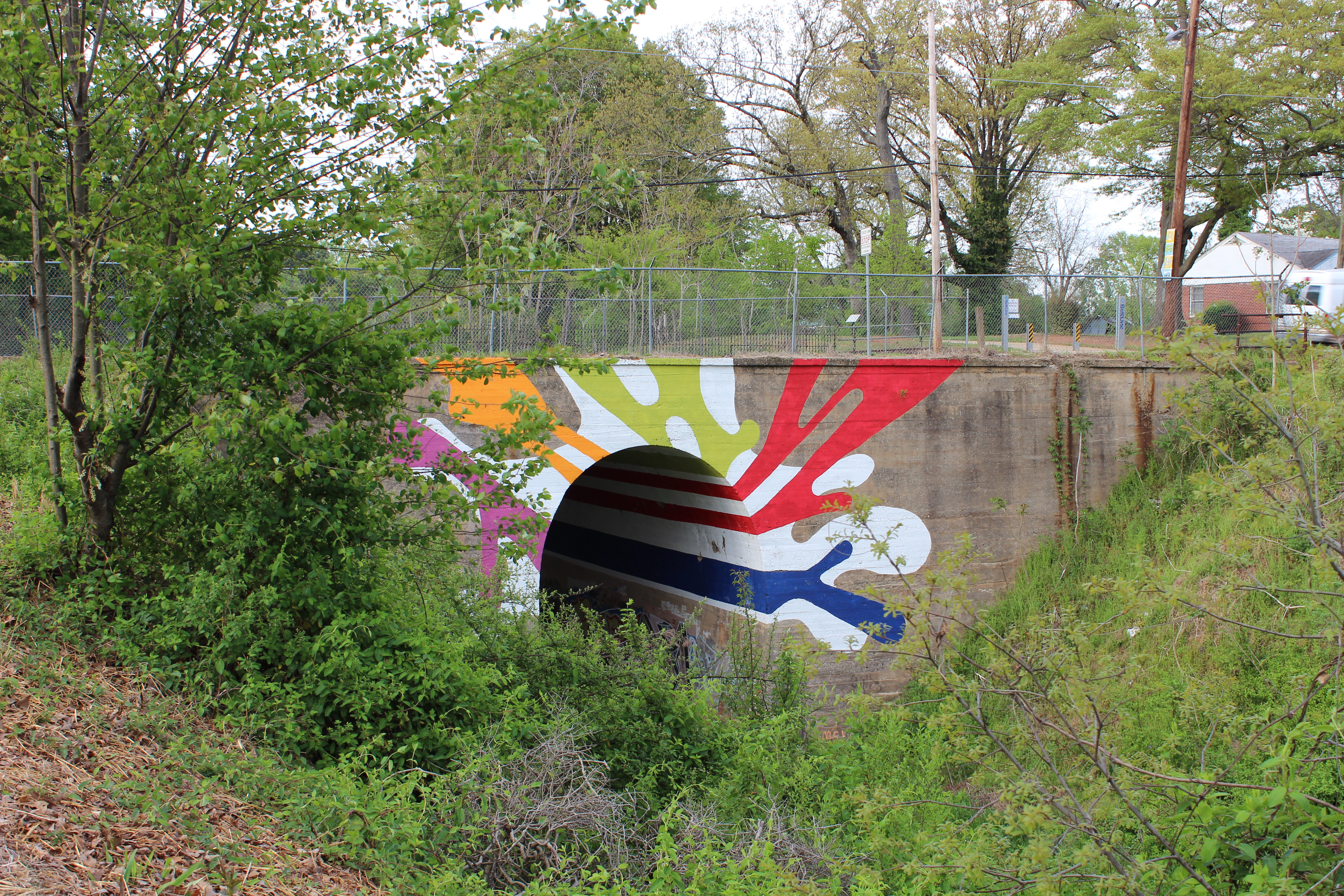
The Lucile Avenue Bridge on the Westside Beltline trail displays a piece of street art entitled "The Highball Artist" painted by Hadley Breckenridge, a local Atlanta artist.
