= Midtown West =

Midtown West may refer to:

- Midtown West (commercial development), a mixed-use commercial complex in West Midtown, Atlanta
- West Midtown, a district of Atlanta, Georgia
- West Midtown, Manhattan, New York
- Hell's Kitchen, Manhattan, New York
- Midtown West, a structure in the Akasaka, Minato, Tokyo development Tokyo Midtown

== See also ==
- Midtown (disambiguation)
