= King Plow/Railroad Historic District =

Coordinates: 33°47′N 84°25′W

The King Plow/Railroad Historic District is a proposed historic district in Midtown West, Atlanta, Georgia. Creation of the district was approved at the state level in 2001 but it has not yet received national certification.

The district would consist of:

- King Plow Arts Center
- Midtown West district, a mixed-use complex on 17 acres bounded by Howell Mill, Marietta, Brady and 10th. It consists of 16 historic buildings housing retail, restaurants, galleries and offices. Includes "The Brickworks" complex.
- the site of the Miller Union Stockyards
- Westside Provisions district, consisting of:
  - White Provisions, a former meatpacking plant
  - Westside Urban Market, on the site of the United Butchers Abattoir (slaughterhouse)
