= Huff House =

Coordinates: 33.7894°N 84.4259°W

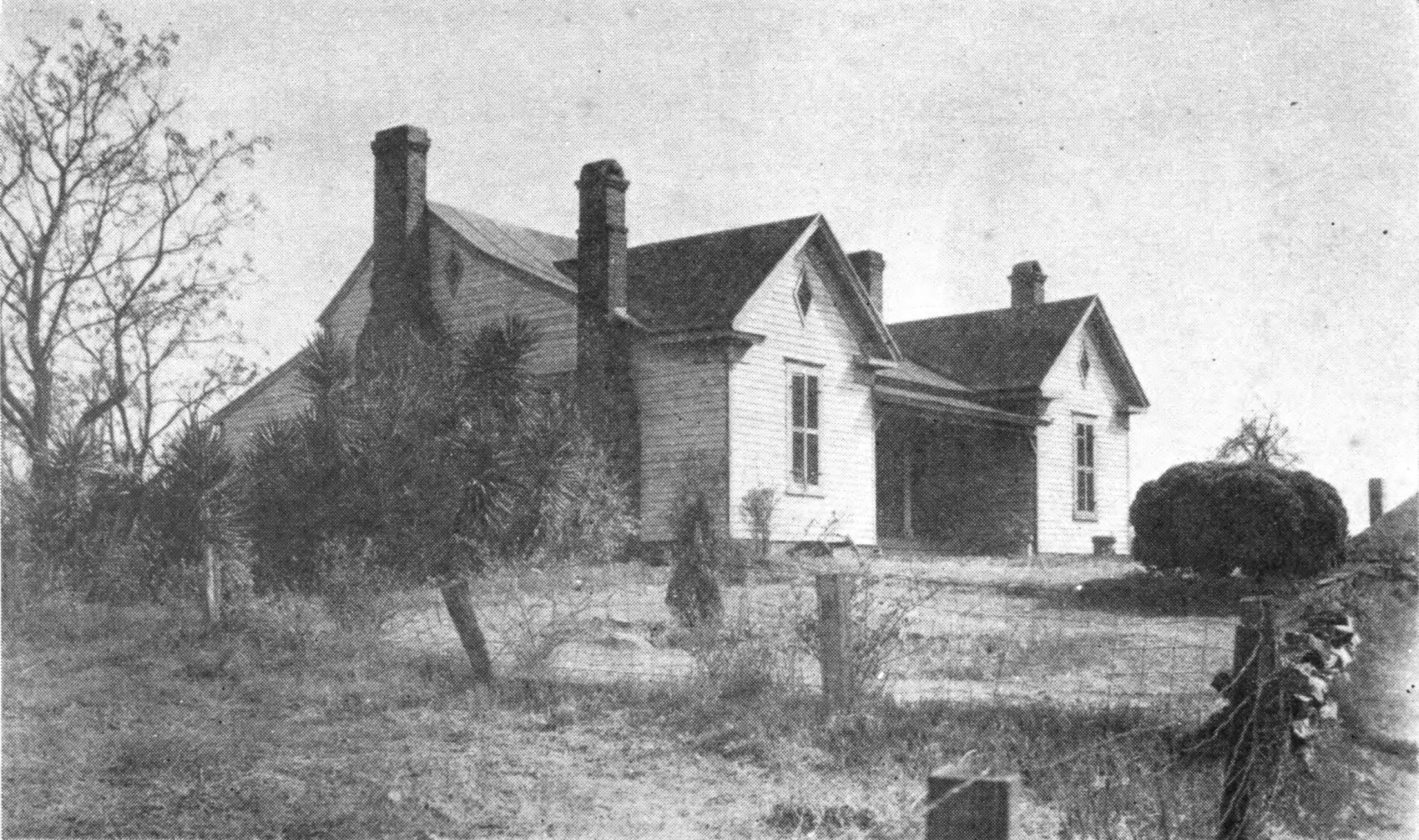
Photo of Huff House published in Sara Huff's 1937 book "My 80 Years in Atlanta"

The Huff House was for decades the oldest house in the city of Atlanta. It was located at the northeast corner of Huff Road and Ellsworth Industrial Avenue. at 1133 Huff Road NW (old numbering, 70 Huff Road NW) in Blandtown, part of what is today West Midtown, overlooking the site of the Battle of Peachtree Creek. It was the family home of Sara Huff, the author of the memoir My 80 Years in Atlanta. Jeremiah Huff built the house of pine and brick in 1854 or 1855 over the remnants of an 1830s log cabin. It was razed in 1954 to make way for the Rushton Toy Factory building. This was covered on the front page of the Atlanta paper at the time. Perennial Properties bought the factory site in 2006, demolished the factory in 2008, and the Apex West Midtown residential development is now located at the site.

Adorning the Huff House was some of the boxwood from the demolished Ponder House, which had stood in the Hemphill Avenue neighborhood. Atlanta historian Franklin Garrett characterized the house as one of the two finest residences in pre-Civil War Atlanta.
