= Howell Interlocking Historic District =

Historic district in Georgia, United States

- U.S. National Register of Historic Places
- U.S. Historic district
- Location within Atlanta Location within Georgia Location within the United States
- Location: Roughly centered on Howell Interlocking at Marietta, W. Marietta Sts., Howell Mill Rd. and Lowery Blvd.
- Coordinates: 33.784547°N 84.415694°W
- Area: 85 acres (34 ha)
- Built: 1889
- Architectural style: Romanesque
- NRHP reference No.: 03000676
- Added to NRHP: July 25, 2003

Howell Interlocking Historic District is the area in West Midtown, Atlanta where four railroad lines converge. It is adjacent to the Marietta Street Artery neighborhood, an area rich in industrial history, as an original industrial district built along Atlanta's first railway line (1837).

== See also ==
- Southern Railway North Avenue Yards Historic District
