= Murray Mill =

Murray Mill may mean:

- Murrays' Mills, in Manchester, England
- Murray's Mill or Murray Mill, another name for the E. Van Winkle Gin and Machine Works in Atlanta, Georgia, USA
