= DuPre Excelsior Mill =

Former manufacturing facility in Atlanta

Coordinates: 33°46′15″N 84°21′53″W

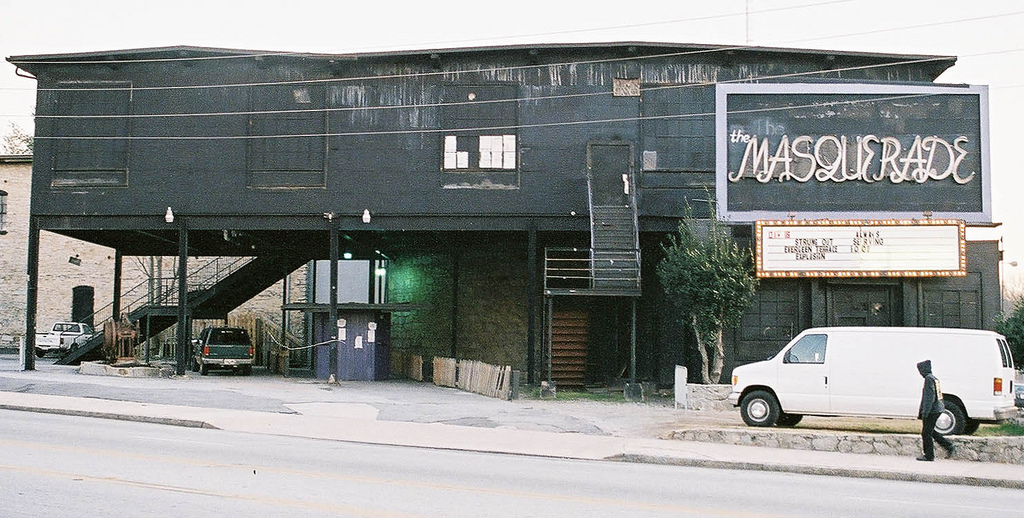
- The Masquerade, January 2006
- Interactive map of DuPre Excelsior Mill
- Former names: Du Pree Manufacturing Company Excelsior Factory, Standard Excelsior Works
- Location: 695 North Avenue; Atlanta, Georgia 30318

Construction
- Built: 1890 (or 1895 or 1905)

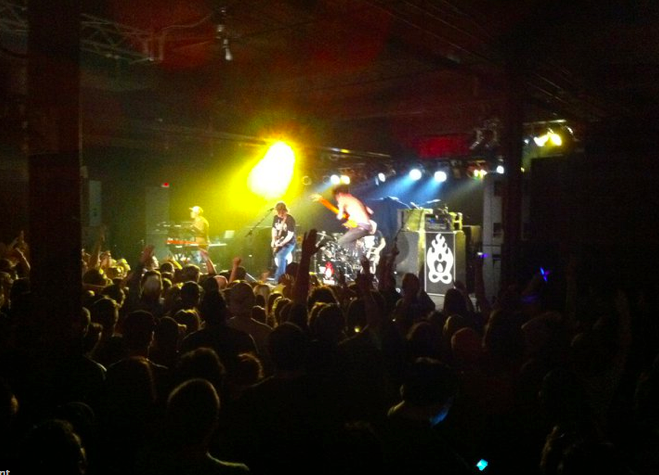
A concert at The Masquerade when it was located at the DuPre Mill

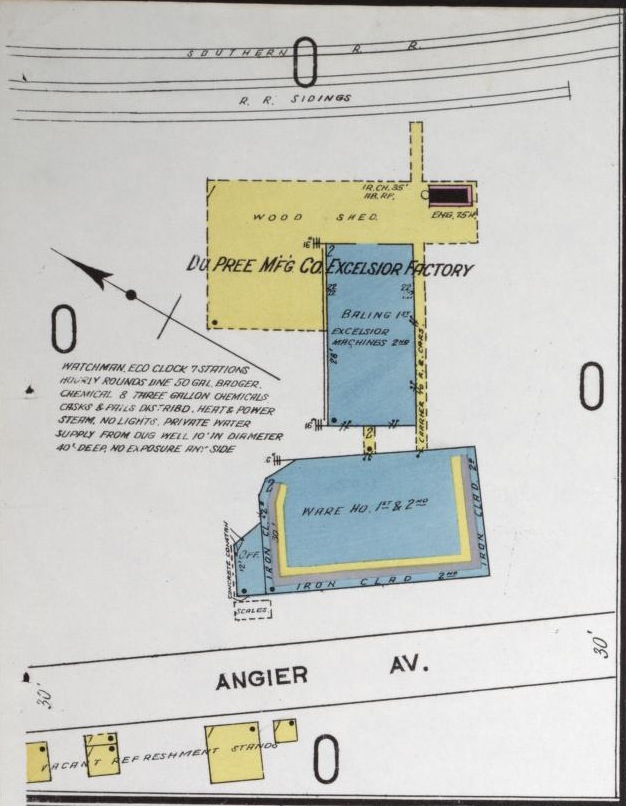
DuPree Mfrg. Co. Excelsior Factory on a 1911 Sanborn map

Located at 695 North Avenue in Atlanta, the Dupre Excelsior Mill (the actual name as of 1911 was "Du Pree Manufacturing Company Excelsior Factory") may have been built as early as 1890 by DuPre (also spelled Du Pree) Manufacturing Company. However, the mill fails to appear on Atlanta city maps in 1892 and 1899, which both show the property as vacant. The first possible reference to the mill exists in the report of the death of Hubert Neal on July 17, 1899. According to the report, his accident occurred at the Atlanta Excelsior Works, which may or may not be the same facility since at the time there were three excelsior factories in Atlanta. The earliest concrete confirmation of the mill seems to be three lawsuits filed against Dupre in 1907 for accidents that occurred at the facility. The mill does appear on the Sanborn-Perris fire insurance map of 1911 (section 250). At that time, the only road connecting it was Angier Street. It was noted to have been heated by steam power, no lighting, and a private water supply from a well 10 feet in diameter and 40 feet deep. A watchman made hourly rounds to seven stations.

The Post-depression era saw an expansion of the mill in the late 1930s and early 1940s. After World War II, the demand for excelsior was radically reduced. The introduction of foam rubber virtually eliminated the use of excelsior as stuffing material. Even so, the secondary packing material market continued for a short time. By the 1960s, the demand for excelsior was non-existent and the mill operated more as a storage facility than active production facility. By 1977, all the major mills in the Atlanta area had shut their doors.

In 1977–1978, the mill was converted over to a pizzeria and barrio. With a Wurlitzer Organ as part of the setting, the Excelsior Mill featured everything from movies to bands to Shakespearian plays over its decade-long run; the pizza and barrio house survived until 1989. The Excelsior Mill, in its later years, is fondly remembered by blues fans as the residence of blues legend Willie "Piano Red" Perryman and an in-house pipe organ. In September 1989, it closed for a time and subsequently re-opened as The Masquerade, becoming a well-known nightclub and concert venue.

After the owner sold the property for a mixed-use land development, now called North + Line, locals and preservationists obtained historic protection for the original buildings, which were to be included in the redevelopment as a restaurant. The Masquerade announced in late June 2016 that it would reopen in the Blandtown section of West Midtown at 1421 Fairmont Ave in late August, just a week after closing its historic mill location. However, this was thwarted by a lawsuit filed by a developer planning to build single-family homes across the street in the industrial area. In mid-September, a deal was reached to temporarily house the club in Kenny's Alley, the bottom level of Underground Atlanta, starting in late October, though the first concert wasn't held there until late November, just two days before Thanksgiving. The last show at the mill was on the 19th of that month.

On December 27, 2019, one wall of the building partially collapsed during construction. As of February 9, 2021, the collapsed wall was repaired and the new space almost ready for tenants.
