= Marietta Street Artery =

Neighborhood of Atlanta, Georgia

Coordinates: 33.774311°N 84.405998°W

Marietta Street Artery (formerly designated as "Bellwood") is an officially defined neighborhood of the city of Atlanta, Georgia, part of the West Midtown area of Atlanta, also known as the "Westside."

The neighborhood consists of Marietta Street and the city blocks immediately to the east and west of it, stretching from 8th Street NW on the north to North Avenue NW on the south. It is bordered by the neighborhoods of Home Park on the north, Georgia Tech on the east, downtown Atlanta on the south, and English Avenue on the west.

The neighborhood consists of many former industrial and warehouse properties which have been transformed into lofts, galleries, theaters, shops, restaurants, and coffee shops.

== History ==
The area began as an industrial area along the railroad line northwest from Atlanta even before the American Civil War — the Western and Atlantic Railroad line was completed in 1837. In 1881 the International Cotton Exposition was held at the north end of the corridor, for which the Exposition Cotton Mills were built. Mule-pulled trolleys brought workers starting in 1882, and these became electrified in 1894. The area continued as an industrial and warehouse area, though the commercial strip along Marietta Street suffered with suburbanization starting in the 1960s. In the 1990s, several adaptive reuse projects kicked off (Hasting's Seed Company, The Carriage Works, King Plow Arts Center, and the Allied Warehouse #2), signaling the renaissance of the area.

Bellwood was annexed to the city of Atlanta in 1897. In January 1913 the Bellwood Viaduct was opened, allowing car and foot traffic to cross the railroad line parallel to Marietta Street to the west side of the city via Bellwood avenue (now Donald Lee Hollowell Pkwy.). The neighborhood of Bellwood was officially renamed Marietta Street Artery in the 2000s.

== Historic districts ==
The Artery area contains or is adjacent to the following NRHP-listed historic districts:

- Means Street Historic District
- Southern Railway North Avenue Yards Historic District
- Howell Interlocking Historic District

== Historic buildings ==
Besides the historic buildings in the historic districts mentioned, the neighborhood also includes the following NRHP-listed buildings:

- King Plow Arts Center
