= Exposition Cotton Mills =

Coordinates: 33°46′44″N 84°24′56″W

The Exposition Cotton Mills were cotton mills located in what is now the West Midtown area of Atlanta at the upper end of the Marietta Street Artery, an area rich with industrial heritage architecture. They were built on what had been Oglethorpe Park for the International Cotton Exposition of 1881 and were demolished in 1952. A warehouse and distribution center now occupy the site.

According to Atlanta historian Franklin Garrett, the success of the mills was "immediate," had been "continuous," and "had much to do with the growth of the cotton-million industry in the South... turning out more than 12,000,000 miles (19,000,000 km) of yarn a month and weaving more than 1,000 miles (1,600 km) of cloth per month.

The original address was 794 West Marietta Street, but has since changed to 841 Joseph E. Lowery Blvd. (formerly Ashby Street) NW.

== See also ==
- Evan Howell, one of the founders
- Fiddlin' John Carson, one-time worker at Exposition Cotton Mills who became a well-known musician later
