= Oglethorpe Park =

Park in Atlanta, Georgia, United States

Coordinates: 33°46′44″N 84°24′56″W

- Type: Municipal park
- Location: Atlanta, Georgia, United States
- Area: 47.25 acres (19.12 ha)
- Opened: 1869
- Closed: 1881
- Owned by: Government of Atlanta

Oglethorpe Park was a municipal park in Atlanta, Georgia, United States. The park, consisting of about 50 acres (20 ha), was created in 1869 and hosted numerous fairs, most notably the International Cotton Exposition in 1881. Following this exposition, the park was sold by the city and was converted into the Exposition Cotton Mills, utilizing facilities that had been built for the event. The closure of the park indirectly contributed to the creation of two later parks in Atlanta: Grant Park and Piedmont Park.

== History ==
Following the American Civil War, Atlanta sought to expand its municipal park space. In the years following the war, the city had two notable parks: City Park and City Hall Park, both located in what is now downtown Atlanta. However, City Park had been significantly damaged during the war and the property was later developed for businesses. Meanwhile, the land for City Hall Park (named for its proximity to Atlanta City Hall) had been donated to the state government to serve as the location for the Georgia State Capitol. Additionally, the city's fairgrounds, which had existed since 1850, were proving inadequate for holding large events. As such, procuring land for a new park was of importance to Atlanta Mayor William Hulsey. Assisting him was Hannibal Kimball, a noted city booster who was involved in many civic projects during the late 1800s, including convincing the state government to move the state's capital to Atlanta and constructing the Kimball House hotel. On March 30, 1869, the city acquired several acres of property near Marietta Street, along the Western and Atlantic Railroad, two miles from the city's train depot. In total, the government of Atlanta purchased 47.25 acres (19.12 ha) for roughly $100 per acre.

Kimball headed the construction efforts for this new park, ensuring that it was properly graded and contained necessary park buildings. Among its amenities, the park had a lake and a race track, which was popular for carriage rides. Starting in 1870, the park would serve as the annual venue for the North Georgia State Fair, while the Georgia State Fair alternated hosts between Oglethorpe Park and a location in Macon, Georgia. By 1879, a report issued by the city placed the value of the park at $100,000. In 1881, Kimball served as the director-general for the International Cotton Exposition, Atlanta's first international exposition, which was held at the park from October 5 to December 3. The main attraction for the exposition was an operating textile mill, and after the fair, the mill and surrounding park were sold for $15,000, with the facilities known as the Exposition Cotton Mills.

Following the sale of the land, local businessman Lemuel Grant deeded land to the city for the creation of another park. The city used the money they had gained from the sale of Oglethorpe Park to landscape this area, which became Grant Park. Meanwhile, drivers in the city who had previously used the facilities at Oglethorpe organized a driving club and began working for the creation of a new park, ultimately leading to the creation of Piedmont Park several years later.

== Sources ==
- Davis, Ren; Davis, Helen (2012). Atlanta's Oakland Cemetery: An Illustrated History and Guide. Introduction by Timothy J. Crimmins. Athens, Georgia: University of Georgia Press. ISBN 978-0-8203-4313-6.
- Galloway, Tammy Harden (2002). The Inman Family: An Atlanta Family from Reconstruction to World War I. Macon, Georgia: Mercer University Press. ISBN 978-0-86554-755-1.
- Garrett, Franklin M. (1969a). Atlanta and Environs: A Chronicle of Its People and Events, 1820s-1870s. Vol. I. Athens, Georgia: University of Georgia Press. ISBN 978-0-8203-3903-0.
- Garrett, Franklin M. (1969b). Atlanta and Environs: A Chronicle of Its People and Events, 1880s-1930s. Vol. II. Athens, Georgia: University of Georgia Press. ISBN 978-0-8203-3904-7.
- McKay, John (2011). It Happened in Atlanta: Remarkable Events That Shaped History. Augusta, Georgia: Morris Book Publishing, LLC. ISBN 978-0-7627-6826-4.
- McMahon, Doreen (October 1944). "Pleasure Spots of Old Atlanta". Atlanta Historical Bulletin. VII (29). Atlanta Historical Society: 220–234 – via Atlanta History Center.
- Mitchell, Eugene Muse (October 1938). "H. I. Kimball; His Career and Defense". Atlanta Historical Bulletin. III (15). Atlanta Historical Society: 249–283 – via Atlanta History Center.
- Reed, Wallace P., ed. (1889). History of Atlanta, Georgia: With Illustrations and Biographical Sketches of Some of Its Prominent Men and Pioneers. Syracuse, New York: D. Mason & Co. ISBN 978-0-7222-0872-4.
- Ripley, George; Dana, Charles A., eds. (1873). The American Cyclopædia: A Popular Dictionary of General Knowledge. Vol. II. New York City: D. Appleton & Company.
- Snodgrass, Mary Ellen (2015). The Civil War Era and Reconstruction: An Encyclopedia of Social, Political, Cultural and Economic History. Vol. 1–2. New York City: Routledge. ISBN 978-1-317-45791-6.
- Wilson, John Stainback (1871). Atlanta as it is: Being a Brief Sketch of Its Early Settlers. New York City: Little, Rennie & Co.
