= International Cotton Exposition =

Exposition held in Atlanta, Georgia, USA it 1881

Coordinates: 33.784457°N 84.41574°W

International Cotton Exposition (I.C.E.)
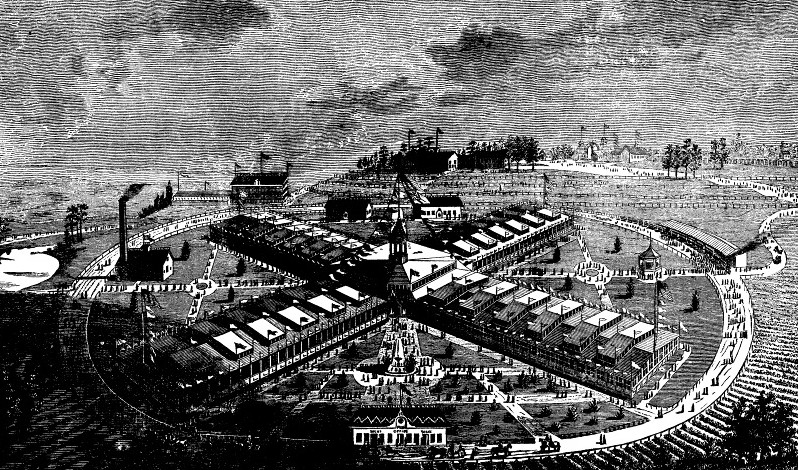
- Contemporary rendering of the Exposition

Overview
- BIE-class: Unrecognized exposition
- Name: International Cotton Exposition (I.C.E.)
- Visitors: 250,000

Location
- Country: United States
- City: Atlanta, Georgia
- Venue: along the Western & Atlantic Railroad tracks near the present-day King Plow Arts Center development

Timeline
- Opening: October 5, 1881
- Closure: December 31, 1881

International Cotton Exposition (I.C.E.) was a world's fair held in Atlanta, Georgia, from October 4 to December 31 of 1881. The location was along the Western & Atlantic Railroad tracks near the present-day King Plow Arts Center development in the West Midtown area. It planned to show the progress made since the city's destruction during the Battle of Atlanta and new developments in cotton production. It demonstrated the rebirth of Atlanta and the South by announcing an end to both the racial progress of the Reconstruction Era and the regional hostilities that had plagued the nation after the Civil War.

Placed a short train ride from downtown, it was designed so that the largest building could later be used as a cotton mill (see Exposition Cotton Mills). A quarter of a million people attended, generating between $220,000 and $250,000 in receipts, split evenly between sales and gate receipts.

== Founding ==
The idea of holding such an exhibition in the South was first suggested by Edward Atkinson of New York, who in August 1880 wrote a letter to a New York journal discussing the great waste incident to the methods then in use in the gathering and handling of the cotton crop and suggested the exhibition, to bring all of those interested in the production of this great Southern staple for the purpose of improvement. The Atlanta Constitution republished the letter and urged the importance of some action in regard thereto.

A few weeks after the publication of this letter it was announced that Atkinson was about to make a Southern trip for the purpose of putting the suggestion into form. H. I. Kimball, being impressed with the importance of the enterprise and personally acquainted with Atkinson, invited him to Atlanta to address the people on the subject. Atkinson accepted this invitation, and at the solicitation of many prominent citizens of Atlanta he delivered, on October 28, 1880, an address in the state Senate chamber, in which he advocated Atlanta as the proper place in which to hold a cotton exhibition, such as would result in devising improved methods in the cultivation of the cotton as well as to be a stimulus to the entire industrial development of this section.

Early that November, James W. Nagle and J. W. Ryckman came to Atlanta to ascertain what action the citizens proposed to take in the matter. At their suggestion several preliminary meetings were held. A committee consisting of Governor A.H. Colquitt, Mayor W.L. Calhoun, ex-Governor R.B. Bullock, and J.W. Ryckman was appointed to prepare a plan for preliminary organization, which resulted in the formation of such an organization and the election of Senator Joseph E. Brown, president; Samuel M. Inman, treasurer; and Ryckman, secretary.

== Incorporation ==
In February 1881, the chamber of commerce proposed and a corporation was organized under the general law, and a charter was obtained from the court. The Atlanta incorporators were those above plus R.F. Maddox, Benjamin E. Crane, Evan P. Howell, M.C. Kiser, Robert J. Lowry, Sidney Root, Campbell Wallace, J.F. Cummings, W.P. Inman, J.C. Peck, L.P. Grant, W.A. Moore, G.J. Foreacre, Richard Peters and E.P. Chamberlin. Associated with them were citizens of several other counties in Georgia and of the states of Pennsylvania, Maryland, Virginia, North and South Carolina, Alabama, Louisiana, Missouri, Massachusetts, New York, Maine, Rhode Island and of London, England. Thus equipped the new enterprise commenced active operations.

At first it was only contemplated that the exposition should be confined to cotton and all pertaining thereto, in its culture, transportation, manufacture, etc. The capital stock of the corporation was originally fixed at $100,000 in shares of $100. As the work advanced, however, and as the country became interested in the subject, it was decided to open its doors for the admission of all products from every section, and the capital stock was therefore to $200,000. H.I Kimball was elected chairman of the 25 member executive committee whose mission was to raise the money.

It was believed if Atlanta subscribed one-third the amount required, other cities interested in the successes of the enterprise would contribute the balance. A canvass of the city was made, and in one day the amount proportioned to Atlanta was secured. Kimball was authorized to visit Northern cities and endeavor to interest them in the undertaking. He visited New York and secured subscriptions to two hundred and fifty-three shares of stock ($25,300); Boston took sixty shares; Baltimore, forty-eight; Norfolk, VA buying twenty-five; Philadelphia, forty-three; Cincinnati, seventy-nine. The gratifying result of Kimball's work in the North and the apparent interest manifested by the whole country caused the executive committee to take immediate steps to put the whole work of organizing and conducting the enterprise in hand. Kimball was named director-general and CEO.

In July, the African-American washerwoman went on strike, using the upcoming exposition as leverage. After initially opposing the 1881 Atlanta washerwomen strike, the city acquiesced to higher rates of pay.

== Construction begins ==
Oglethorpe Park was selected as the site of the exposition. It belonged to the city and was located two and one half miles northwest from the railroad depot, and on the line of the Western & Atlantic Railroad. This park was originally laid out and improved under the direction of Kimball, in 1870 for the use of agricultural fairs, but the work of adapting the grounds and erecting the necessary buildings for the exposition was not an easy task. The work was begun under Kimball's direction and rapidly pushed to completion and made ready in ample time for the opening of the exposition.

The main building was constructed after a general model of a cotton factory, as suggested by Atkinson, the form being a Greek cross, the transept nearly half the length, the agricultural and carriage annexes extending along the southern side, and the mineral and woods department forming an annex at the extreme western end of the building. Its extreme length was seven hundred and twenty feet, the length of the transport four hundred feet, and the width of the arms ninety-six feet. The dimensions of the remaining principal buildings were as follows:

- Railroad building, 200x100 feet
- Railroad annexes, 40x60 and 40x100 feet
- Agricultural implement building 96x288 feet
- Carriage annex, 96x212 feet
- Art and industry building, 520x60 feet
- Judge's hall, 90x120 feet
- Horticultural hall, 40x80 feet
- Restaurant, 100x200 feet

There were several other buildings, as the Florida building, press pavilion, police headquarters, etc., and quite a number of individuals or collective exhibitors erected buildings for themselves.

== Opening ==
The exposition was opened on October 5, 1881, and the occasion formed a memorable day in the history of Atlanta. The event was attended by many governors, senators, and congressmen; and addresses were made by Kimball, Governor Colquitt, North Carolina Senator Z.B. Vance, and Indiana Senator D.W. Voorhees.

The exposition was a success in every way. The entire number of exhibits was 1,113, of which the Southern States contributed more than half; New England and Middle States, 341; Western States, 138; and foreign, 7. The gross receipts were $262,513, and the total disbursements $258,475. The average daily attendance was 3,816 for the seventy-six days it was open. The largest number of admissions on any one day occurred on December 7, Planters' Day, when there were 10,293.

Governor's Day, October 27, 1881, was another important day to the exposition a few days after opening day. It was a celebratory day for the governor and a mural was unveiled to represent the new South. J.H Moser was the artist and named his mural "The New South Welcoming the Nations of the Earth." The painting was highly admired by those who had the chance to see it. The mural was actually never found and no images of the painting were ever recovered but should be acknowledged, since the image summed up the message intended by the exposition. There were many written detailed descriptions of the mural by viewers and newspapers. The image was centered around an attractive brunette girl with the American flag wrapped around her. She is depicted with one hand pointing towards the exhibit, on her right, while having her other hand above a bale of cotton. Above her, Uncle Sam is shown also welcoming the visitors. Columbia is in the background displayed with a smile of approval and Clio is shown with a pen ready to keep record of this special event. The image also included African Americans in a cotton field picking the staples.

The exposition also demonstrated the cotton gins in action and on Governor's day the machines were set up to make two suits. A machine would first pick the cotton straight from Oglethorpe's field in the morning and from there it was taken to a Cromptom loom. In the Cromptom loom it was woven into cloth and taken to the main building, the Wheeler and Wilson exhibit. At the end of the day two professional suits would be created and tailored for the governor to wear in the evening. The whole process was exhibited in the exposition and done in only one day. On Governor's Day the two governors of the North and South wore their freshly made suits to the ball clad. This was seen as a huge milestone for the union of the North and South. The Exposition Cotton Mills were opened on the site in 1882 and remained in operation until 1969.

This article incorporates text from the public domain 1902 book, Atlanta And Its Builders by Thomas H. Martin

== See also ==
- World Cotton Centennial, 1884 in New Orleans
- Piedmont Exposition, 1887 in Atlanta
- Cotton States and International Exposition, 1895 in Atlanta
