= Sid Mashburn =

American fashion designer

Sid Mashburn (born c. 1961) is an American fashion designer and co-owner of his eponymous brand based in Atlanta, with his wife Ann Mashburn.

== Early life and education ==
Mashburn grew up in Brandon, Mississippi in a Southern Baptist family. He identifies as a "good faith Christian". He was influenced in his lifelong love of watches by his father, who was a watch collector. His grandparents were the proprietors of Collier's Cash & Carry in the neighboring town of Pelahatchie, a store which sold clothing and home goods. Mashburn hoped to attend college in New York at FIT or Parsons, but attended Ole Miss at the encouragement of his father and earned a bachelor's degree in English in 1983.

== Career ==
When Mashburn and his wife were first dating, she worked for Vogue and introduced him to a contact with a new mail-order catalog, J.Crew. Mashburn became its first menswear designer, and designed one of its earliest classics, the barn jacket. Ralph Lauren later recruited him to design for Polo Ralph Lauren. He then worked for Tommy Hilfiger, and finally Lands' End.

Sid and Ann launched his namesake label in 2007 in Atlanta. Ann Mashburn launched her eponymous women's line in 2010. The Mashburn brand has brick-and-mortar stores in Atlanta, Charlotte, Houston, Dallas, Houston, Nashville, New York City, the Georgetown neighborhood of Washington D.C., and Los Angeles, with Sid Mashburn stores next to Ann Mashburn stores, but not sharing the same space. The brand's concept store in Atlanta's Westside Provisions district carries its children's line, Kid Mashburn.

== Reception ==
GQ magazine dubbed him "the South's best-dressed man." Atlanta magazine stated that the Mashburns built an "empire" defined by "effortless cool." In 2025 The New York Times included Sid and Ann Mashburn's stores on a list of 50 Best Clothing Stores in America. Graydon Carter's Air Mail called Sid "Georgia's Ralph Lauren." Gwyneth Paltrow's lifestyle brand goop, which also profiled Ann, called Sid Mashburn stores among "the best in the country." Tray Butler''s travel guides for Atlanta named the Mashburns "Best Couture Couple."

== See also ==
- Joseph Abboud
- Geoffrey Beene
- Bill Blass
- Perry Ellis
- Ralph Lauren
- Ann Mashburn
- Billy Reid
- Todd Snyder
- John Varvatos
