= Chore jacket =

Type of jacket

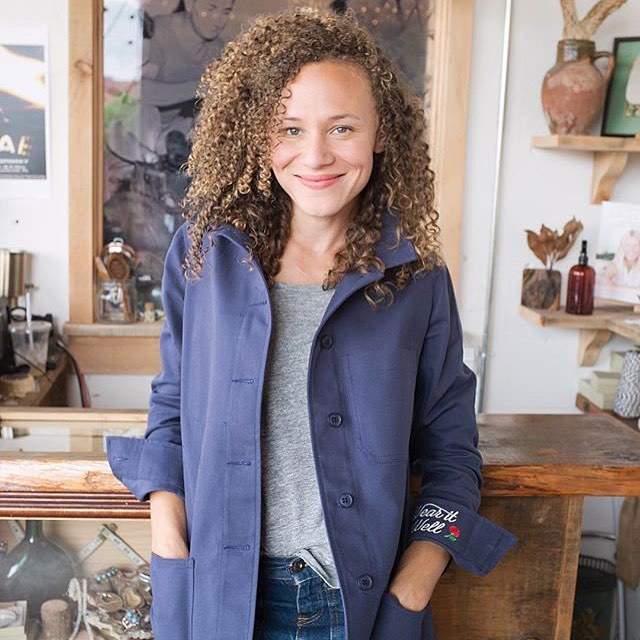
A woman wearing a blue chore jacket.

A chore jacket, also known as a chore coat or French worker's jacket, is a jacket that originated in 19th-century France. Designed for laborers, railroad workers, and farmers, it is traditionally crafted from durable fabrics like denim, heavy cotton drill, or moleskin, featuring roomy pockets (originally for tools and tobacco tins), and button cuffs to allow easy rolling of the sleeves.

The American variant is called a barn jacket. Both share a boxy cut, multiple front pockets, and durable fabrics, though the barn jacket is generally warmer, heavier and more structured, often with a waxed or weatherproof finish designed for outdoor work in colder climates. Its most recognizable feature is the corduroy or leather collar, a detail absent from traditional French chore coats.

== History ==
=== Origin in France ===
The chore jacket emerged in France during the industrial expansion of the 19th century as practical buttoned outerwear with wide pockets and a loose fit designed for manual labor. Its sturdy fabric and functional design made it an essential uniform among French workers. The simplicity and durability of the jacket reflected the needs of an era defined by craftsmanship and physical labor.

The jacket's deep indigo color, achieved through natural dyes, earned it the name bleu de travail ("working blues"), which later inspired the American term "blue-collar worker". Typically, it was paired with matching trousers and was predominantly blue, although carpenters often sported black versions. Some workers even had a black jacket reserved for Sunday church services.

Chore jackets continue to be produced in France by traditional manufacturers such as Le Mont Saint Michel, Vétra and Le Laboureur.

=== Adoption in the United States ===
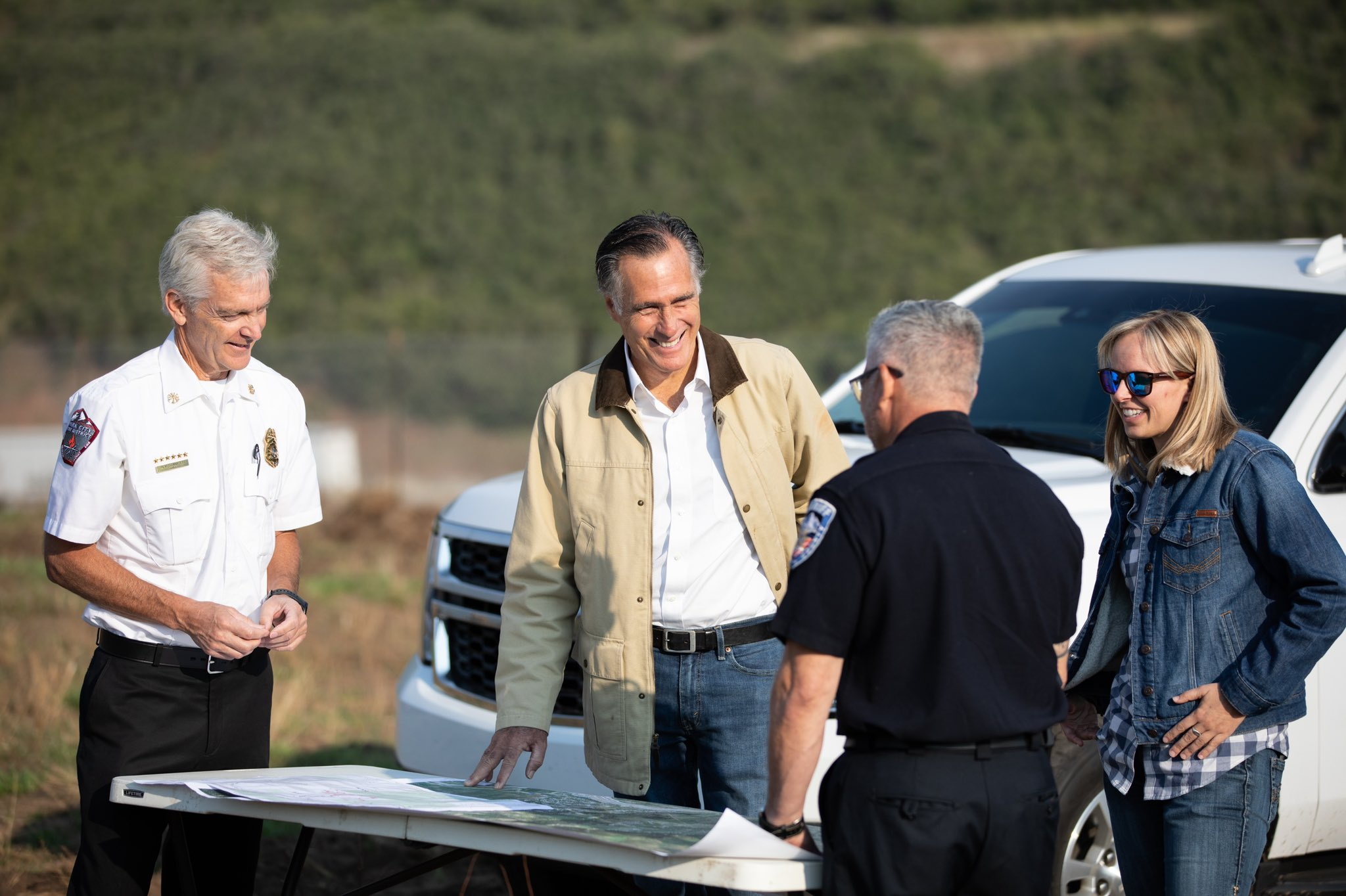
Mitt Romney (center) wearing a beige barn jacket.

By the 1890s, the French chore jacket had reached North America, where it was adopted by rural Midwestern workers and evolved into the barn jacket, a term linked to its use for farm and barn work. Farmers and outdoor workers valued it for its durability and warmth, particularly during the colder months.

During the 1920s, the garment was being mass-produced in the United States, most notably by the workwear company Carhartt, whose 1917 version introduced notable innovations such as a corduroy-lined collar, triple-stitched seams, copper-riveted pockets, and a sturdier cut suited to harsh conditions. Other American companies, including L.L. Bean, further diversified the style with new fabrics and colors, leading to variants made from waxed canvas, a material still popular in contemporary fashion.

At least until the 1940s, the garment was being worn as Los Angeles County Jail clothing, and as costuming in Hollywood movies.

=== Cultural evolution ===
The jacket transitioned into mainstream fashion during the 1990s. Brands like J.Crew, Lands' End, Burberry, and Ralph Lauren reinterpreted the jacket as a preppy wardrobe essential evoking nostalgia for traditional craftsmanship and outdoor life. J.Crew's version was designed by Sid Mashburn, the firm's first menswear designer. Transcending its utilitarian roots, it became a symbol of rugged, understated Americana, worn by royal figures like Queen Elizabeth II and Princess Diana, and embraced by urban subcultures such as Dimes Square hipsters in New York. In the 2000s, the chore jacket gained popularity as an item of smart casual attire in Western countries, particularly among creative professionals. American photographer Bill Cunningham (1929–2016) was known for his penchant for blue French chore jackets.

In the early 21st century, the chore jacket entered the realm of high fashion, appearing on the runways of Valentino, Balenciaga, Loewe, Fendi, and Prada. Modern iterations have included cropped silhouettes, exaggerated pockets, and luxury fabrics, confirming its evolution from workwear staple to an enduring icon of functional elegance.

== Similar garments ==
The barn jacket, with its typical corduroy collar, is similar in aesthetic to the Barbour waxed jacket, designed for British and Irish country life.

The British donkey jacket, characterized by reinforced shoulder patches, also bears some resemblance to the chore jacket in both form and function. Yet, unlike the chore or barn jacket, it has never fully transcended its working-class roots, remaining a symbol of British labor heritage, even as some luxury brands such as Drake's offer refined reinterpretations of the style.
