= Midtown West (commercial development) =

Coordinates: 33.779733°N 84.411405°W

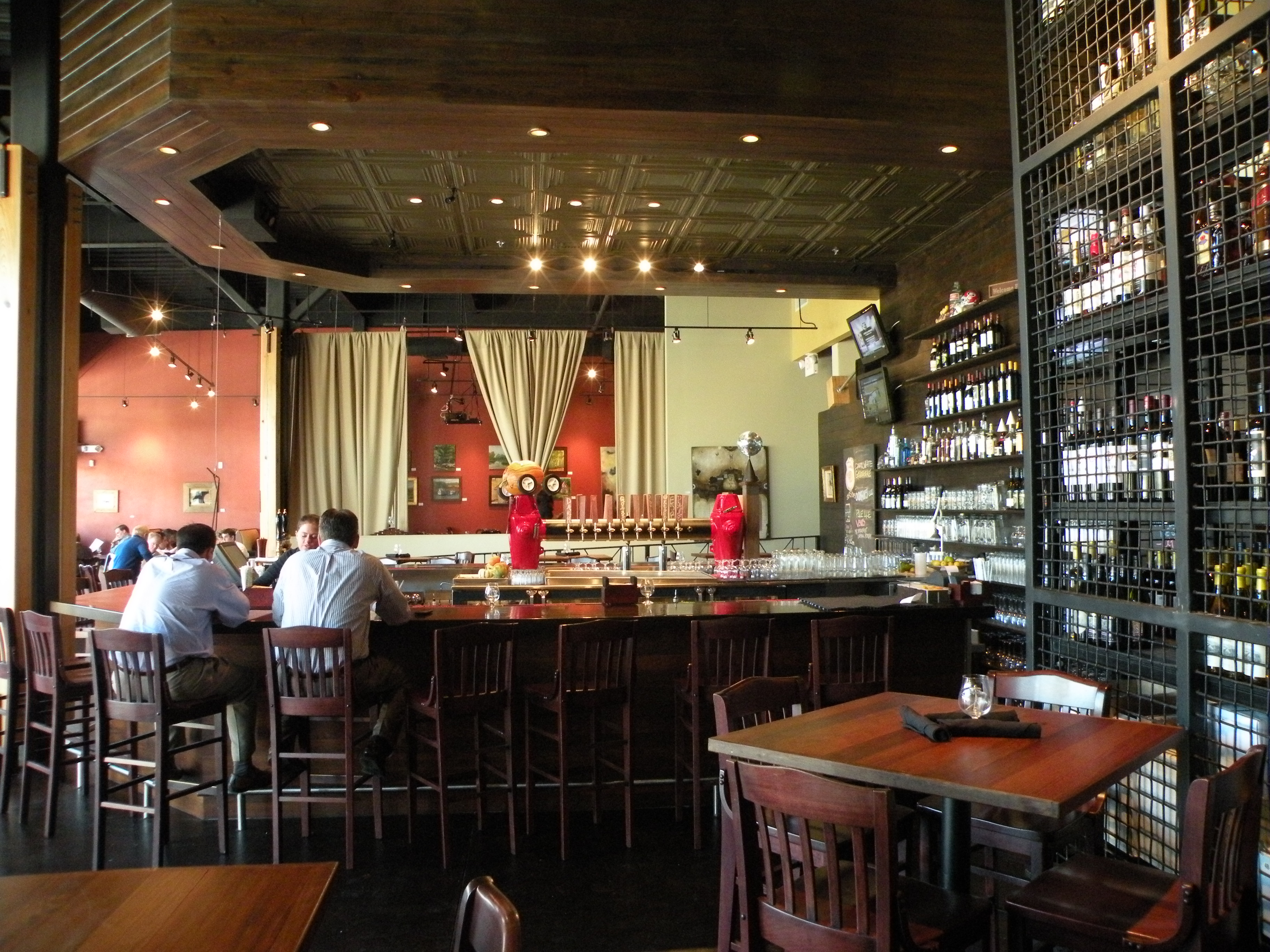
5 Seasons Bar & Restaurant located in Brickworks at Midtown West

Midtown West is a 12-acre commercial development in West Midtown, Atlanta. It consists of historic warehouse space renovated for use as restaurants, other hospitality and offices. It includes the Brickworks building at the intersection of Howell Mill Rd. and Marietta St.

Tenants include the 5 Seasons Westside Brewpub, and three restaurants: Miller Union, Bocado and The Optimist. Former tenants include the Emily Amy Gallery which closed in 2013.
