= Ann Mashburn =

American fashion designer

Ann Mashburn is an American brand founder and eponym, womenswear designer, and former fashion editor. She is married to menswear designer Sid Mashburn, and she established the womenswear side of their family business as a counterpart to his menswear group. She graduated in 1983 with a degree in finance from the Leeds School of Business at the University of Colorado, Boulder. Then she got her fashion start at Vogue, hired personally by Polly Mellen to be her assistant. Mashburn was also a fashion editor at Glamour, and a stylist at J. Crew. She and her husband launched his menswear store in 2007, and by 2010 she opened her own shops, which are next door to Sid's locations.

Under the banner "Why We Love It," Gwyneth Paltrow's lifestyle brand goop calls Ann Mashburn clothing "well-made classics," and the Mashburns "a powerhouse sartorial couple." Leighton Rowell and Virginia Prescott presented the Mashburn name as "synonymous with style." Mary Logan Bikoff asserted in Atlanta magazine that the Mashburns have an "empire" defined by "effortless cool." The New York Times put their stores on its list of 50 Best Clothing Stores in America. She was featured alongside her husband in Graydon Carter's weekly Air Mail, where the editors dubbed Sid, and by extension Ann since they have been partners from the start, as "Georgia's Ralph Lauren."
