= Means Street Historic District =

Historic district in Georgia, United States

- U.S. National Register of Historic Places
- U.S. Historic district
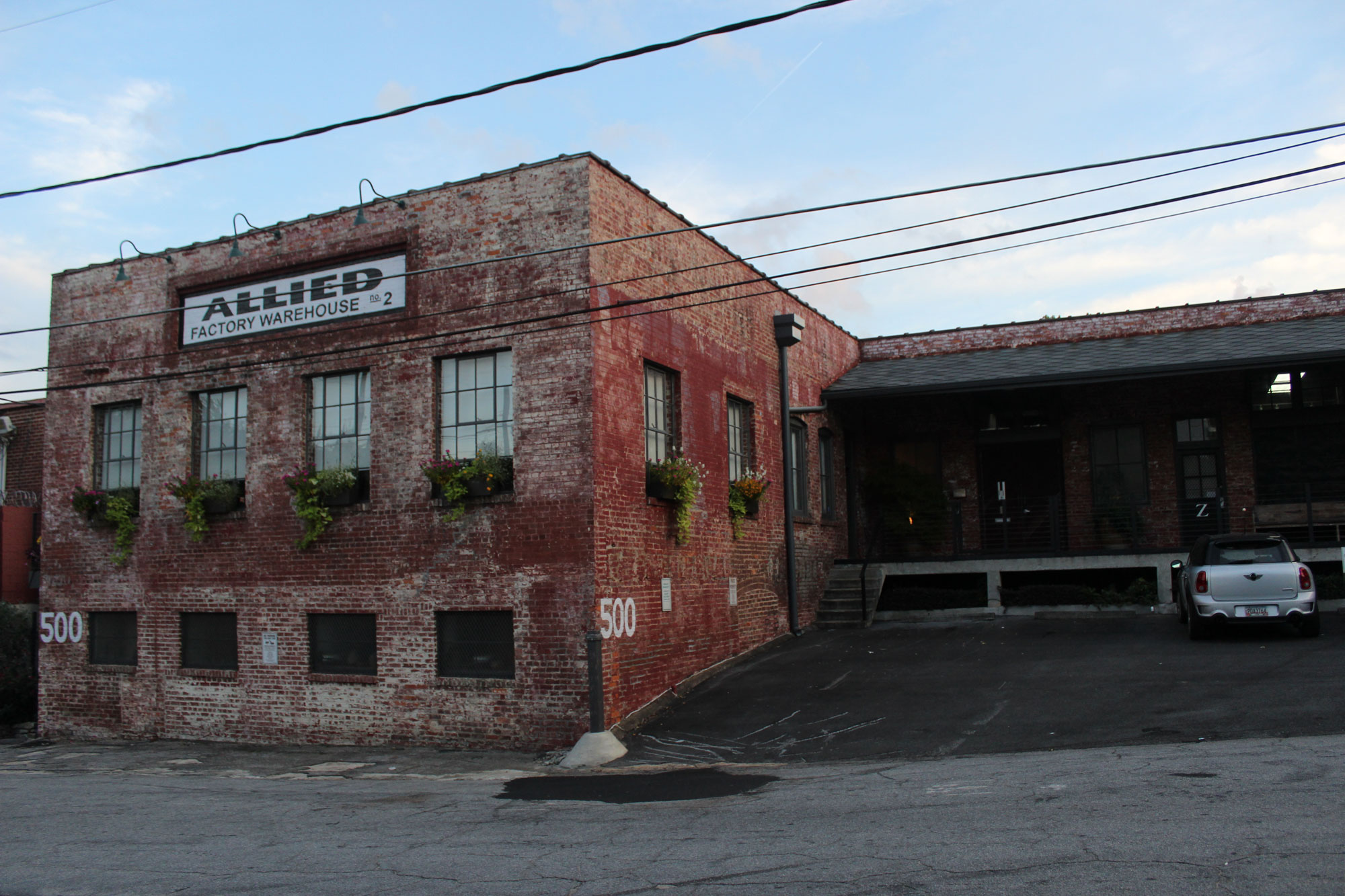
- Allied Factory Warehouse No. 2

- Location within Atlanta Location within Georgia Location within the United States
- Location: Bounded by Marietta St., Bankhead and Ponders Aves., and the Southern rail line, Atlanta
- Coordinates: 33°46′22″N 84°24′18″W
- Built: from 1869
- Architectural style: commercial eclectic
- NRHP reference No.: 01000648
- Added to NRHP: 2001-06-14

The Means Street Historic District in the Marietta Street Artery district of Atlanta consists of historic, mostly 19th and early 20th century warehouse and industrial buildings now converted to office space along one block of Means St. between Bankhead and Ponders Aves. Means Street was named for landowner Alexander Means and was plotted in 1869. Warehouses were built in this early industrial corridor, then known as Bellwood, along the railroad line. Mule-pulled trolleys brought workers starting in 1882, and these became electrified in 1894. The area is commonly referenced by rapper Playboi Carti.

Contributing properties include:

- Allied Factory Lofts, 500 Means Street, originally built in the late 19th century by the Standard Oil Company to be used as a barrel making shop. Now lofts.
- Atlanta Spring Bed Company - Block Candy Company, 512 Means Street. Originally constructed to house a furniture manufacturing company. Later used as warehouse space, candy manufacturing company, and a textile salvage company. Now office space.
- Atlanta Buggy Company and Ware-Hatcher Bros. Furniture Company /The Carriage Works, 530 & 544 Means Street. Includes the remaining portion of the 1907 Ware-Hatcher building which was used for furniture manufacturing, and which took over the 1903 Atlanta Buggy Company building, which was originally a buggy factory. Now office space.
- Standard Oil Company Inc. of Kentucky, 535 Means Street, now the Atlanta Contemporary Art Center

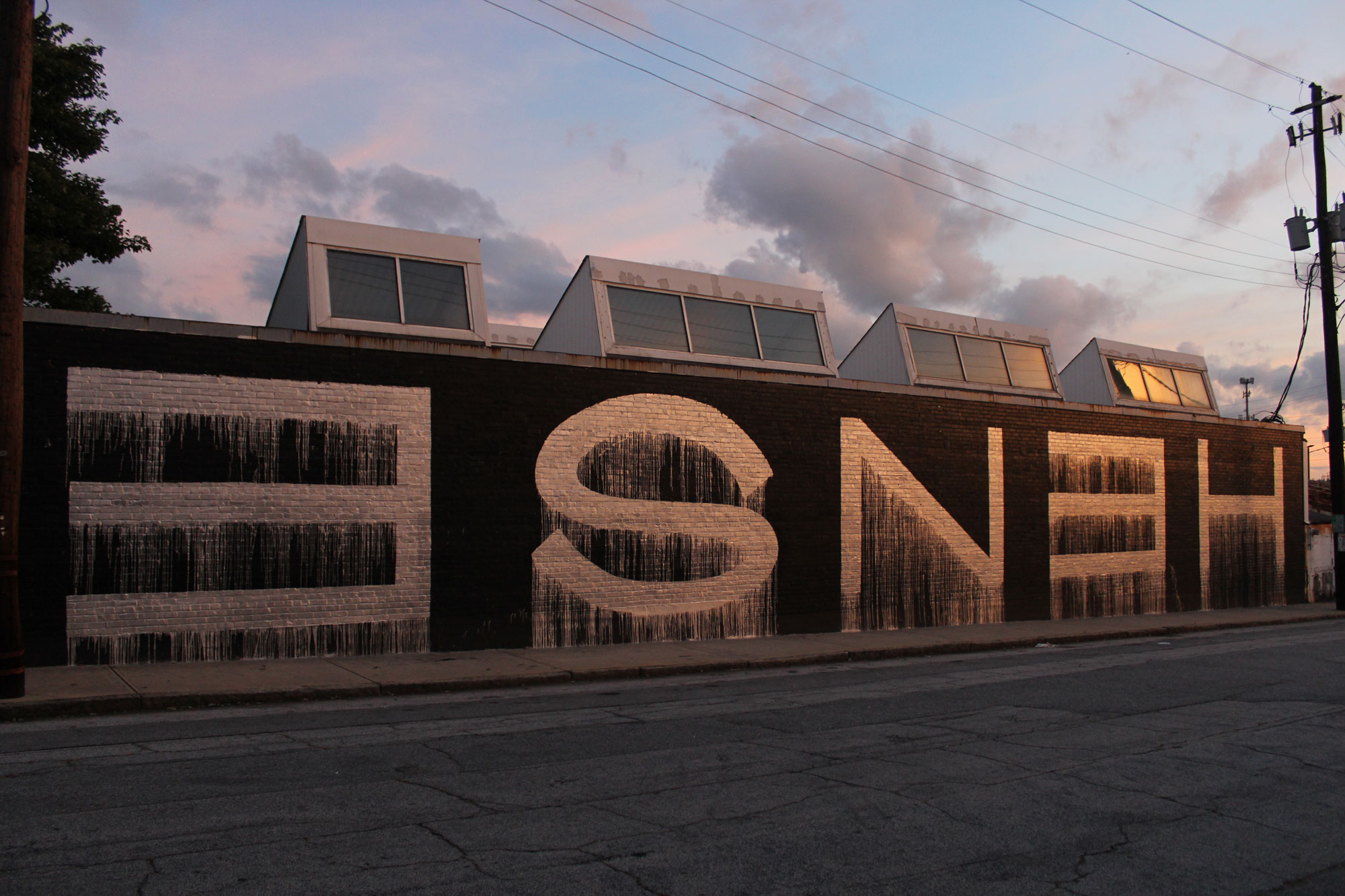
Atlanta Contemporary Art Center
