= The Masquerade (Atlanta) =

Concert venue in Atlanta, Georgia, U.S.

- The Masq
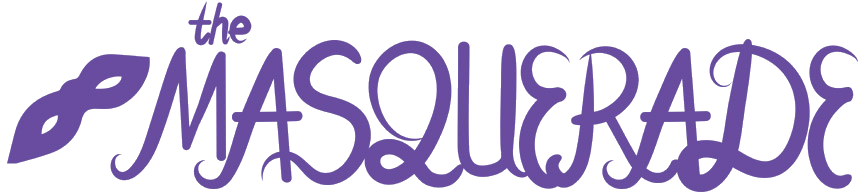

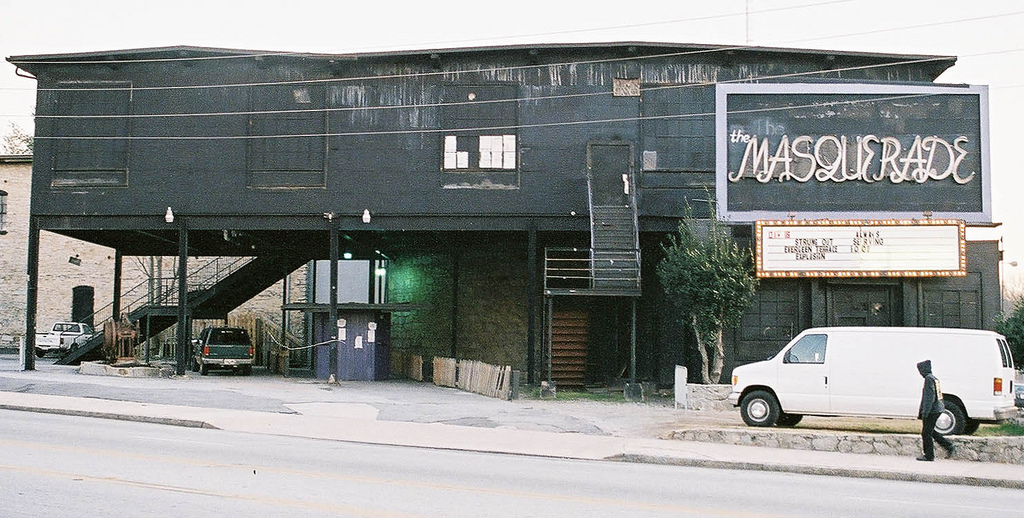
- Exterior of the venue at its former location, DuPre Mill (c. 2006)
- Interactive map of The Masquerade
- Address: 50 Lower Alabama St SW, Ste. 22; Atlanta, Georgia 30303-7602
- Location: Underground Atlanta
- Coordinates: 33.751539°N 84.3920599°W
- Capacity: 1,450 (Heaven); 650 (Hell); 300 (Purgatory); 250 (Altar)

Construction
- Opened: September 1989

Website
- masqueradeatlanta

The Masquerade is a mid-sized concert venue located in Atlanta, Georgia, United States. It is located in Kenny's Alley, the lowest level of Underground Atlanta. The venue first opened in 1989 at the historic DuPre Excelsior Mill, a century-old former manufacturing plant. It became known throughout its early history as one of the city's premier alternative music spaces, hosting styles ranging from punk rock to electronic music. Its three stages, named after the destinations of the afterlife—Heaven, Purgatory, and Hell—forge distinct musical identities. After the space was sold in the 2000s, the Masquerade relocated to its current location in Underground Atlanta, where it retained its three concert spaces and added a fourth named Altar (2024).

== Background ==
Its live music mostly consists of alternative music styles, such as indie rock, metal, punk rock, rockabilly, and electronic, ranging from local acts to ones internationally known. The Masquerade's three principal interior stages—Heaven, Purgatory, and Hell—were originally separated on different levels of the mill, though they are now all on the same level with separate entrances. At the mill, Heaven was upstairs above Hell at the right (west) side of the building, with Purgatory as the bar area downstairs to the left, all accessed from a central entryway behind the box office with a stairway to Heaven. The address for the parking deck and entrance is 75 Martin Luther King Jr, DR, SW.

== History ==
The Masquerade was founded in September 1989 at the historic DuPre Excelsior Mill, a former excelsior mill at 695 North Avenue in the Old Fourth Ward neighborhood. The historic space, which dates back to the 1890s, served as the venue's home for its first twenty-seven years. The Masquerade has its roots in the Excelsior Pub and Cinema, a restaurant which occupied the space in the 1980s, and hosted touring bands on occasion.

The venue was known for its grungy, cavernous feel, variety of genres, as well as its adjacency to the Murder Kroger. The floors in Heaven would regularly shake and bend with the weight of patrons. On New Year's Eve 2002, the stairs to Heaven caved in, causing minor injuries. Urban legends suggested the space was haunted by a vampire. The original building was sold in 2006 after it was made part of a new mixed-use development called North + Line. The building was designated as historic by the city and all of the original parts will be saved through adaptive reuse. The space eventually became the Mill, a mixed-use office space. The building partially collapsed during construction in 2019.

The venue originally planned to relocate to a warehouse on the city's west side, but when a lawsuit over noise concerns threatened the move, the Masquerade temporarily moved to the former Kenny's Alley space in Underground Atlanta in October 2016. The move was an adjustment for concertgoers; "It took a while for the Masquerade to find its footing at the new location," wrote Sean Keenan of Curbed Atlanta.

In 2024, Masquerade added a fourth, smaller venue named Altar with a capacity of 250.

== Reception ==
The original Masquerade location was widely beloved in the Atlanta community and music scene at large. Many rock artists, ranging from indie rock, punk, metal, and more performed at the original location, including many artists who went on to achieve great fame. Ian MacKaye of Fugazi observed its original location was "clearly a unique space," adding, "I'm glad that we had the opportunity to play there." Josh Green at Urbanize Atlanta called the club "iconic and gritty"; A writer for Consequence likened its floorboards to a trampoline, calling the original spot a "scary" though "exciting" dilapidated building. Pitchfork called the venue one of "America’s Best Independent Music Venues".

== Notable musical performances ==
Well-known acts that have performed there include:

- "Weird Al" Yankovic
- 21 Savage
- Afghan Whigs
- Alice in Chains
- American Football
- Bayside
- Björk
- Blind Melon
- Blink-182
- Blur
- Chemical Brothers
- Coldplay
- Dan Deacon
- Danzig
- Dave Matthews Band
- Deafheaven
- Deerhunter
- Dinosaur Jr.
- Dio
- Dropkick Murphys
- Faith No More
- Flogging Molly
- Foo Fighters
- Franz Ferdinand
- Fugazi
- Goodie Mob
- Green Day
- INXS
- Iron Maiden
- Letters to Cleo
- Lamb of God
- Lil Peep
- Linkin Park
- Marilyn Manson
- Mastodon
- Misfits
- Nine Inch Nails
- Nirvana
- Oasis
- OutKast
- Panic! at the Disco
- Phish
- Playboi Carti
- Public Enemy
- Queens of the Stone Age
- Quicksand
- Radiohead
- Rage Against the Machine
- Ramones
- Sheryl Crow
- Social Distortion
- Sorority Noise
- Stone Temple Pilots
- Sum 41
- The Ataris
- The Black Dahlia Murder
- The Cranberries
- The Joy Formidable
- The Killers
- The Menzingers
- The Smashing Pumpkins
- The Village People
- Thirty Seconds to Mars
- Tigers Jaw
- Tobi Lou
- Tool
- Turnstile
- Travis Scott
- Weezer
- Young Gods
