= Goat Farm Arts Center =

- E. Van Winkle Gin and Machine Works
- U.S. National Register of Historic Places
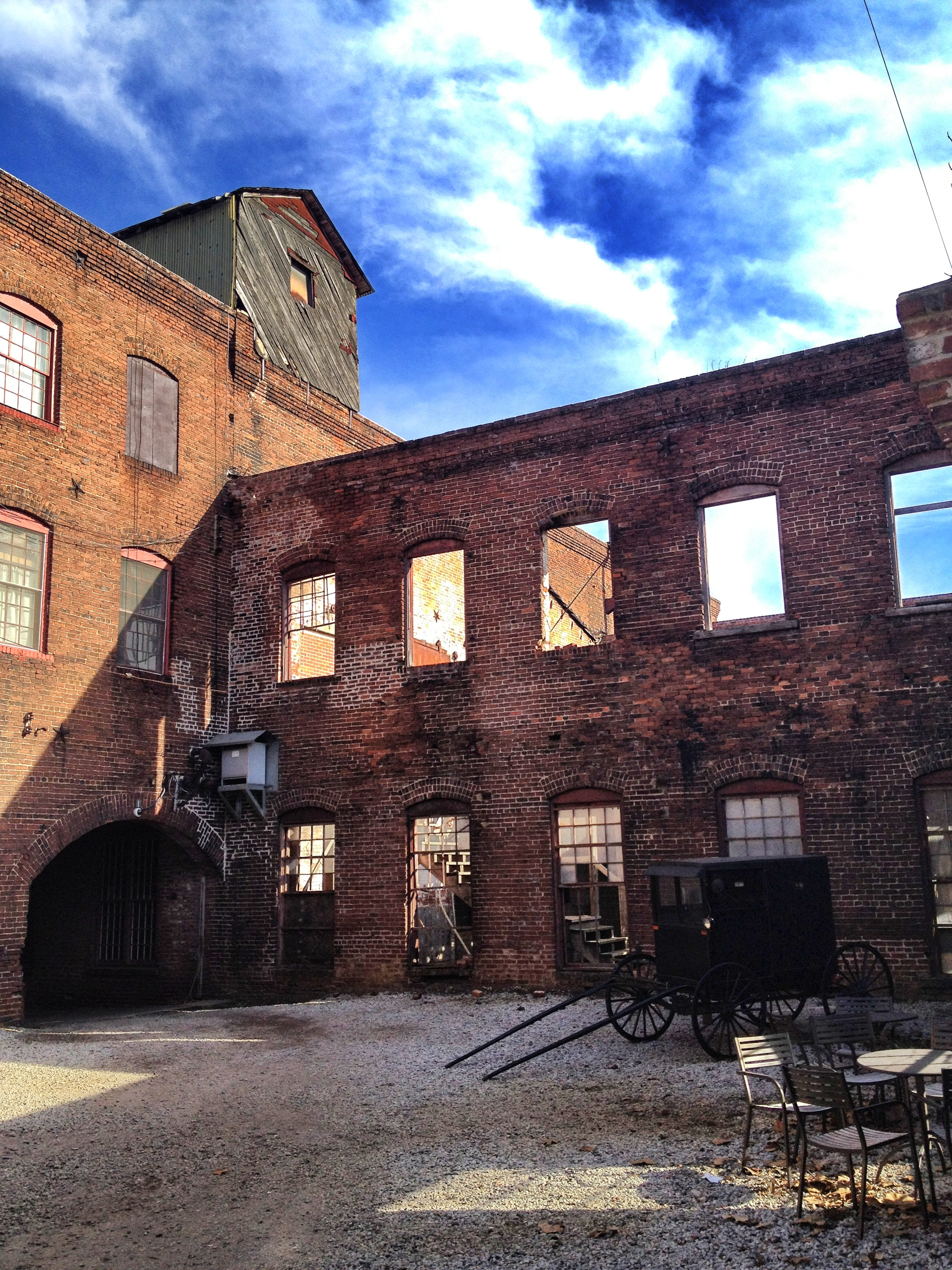
- Goat Farm Arts Center, Nov. 2011
- Location: West Midtown, Atlanta, GA, USA
- Coordinates: 33.786228°N 84.416226°W
- Area: 12 acres (4.9 ha)
- Built: 1880s
- Architectural style: American Movement
- NRHP reference No.: 79000726
- Added to NRHP: September 10, 1979

The Goat Farm Arts Center is a visual and performing arts center located in West Midtown, Atlanta, Georgia. The center is housed in a 19th-century complex of industrial buildings and contains the studio space of over 300 artists. Goat Farm hosts music concerts, traditional and experimental theatrical performances, film screenings, contemporary dance performances, art exhibitions, artist residency programs, and professional ballet and contemporary dance classes. It is also home to resident performance companies gloATL, Saiah Theater, and The Collective Project.

== History ==
The original machine works complex opened in 1889 and expanded in various phases through the early 1930s. It was Edward Van Winkle's third complex in Atlanta - a previous one was located in today's Luckie Marietta district. By 1898, the site specialized in cotton-related machinery, and won awards at international expositions and state fairs. In 1912, the Murray Company of Texas bought out Van Winkle and the site became known as "Murray's Mill." During World War II, the complex produced ammunition.

In the early 1970s Robert Haywood bought the site and sculptors, musicians, painters and photographers set up studios there. For a time in the early 2000s space was rented to antique dealers as "The Shops at Murray Mill", but the antique mall never took off. The site remained unused for many years.

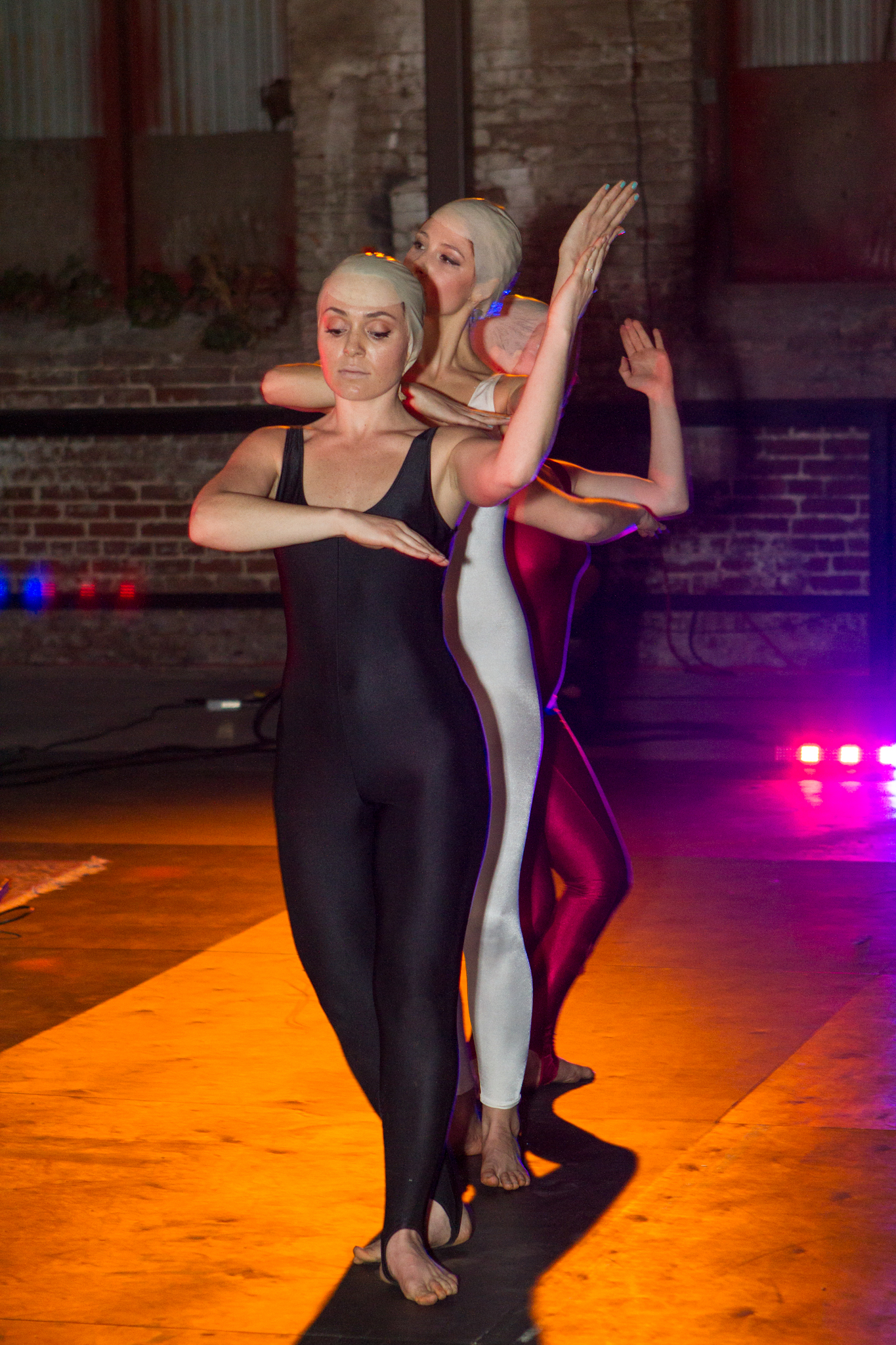
A dance performance at Goat Farm

In 2008, Hallister Development filed a "Developments of Regional Impact" application with the Georgia Regional Transportation Authority for a project containing 426 residential units at the location, to contain 96,000 square feet (8,900 m^{2}) of office and 96,000 square feet (8,900 m^{2}) of retail on the property. In 2009, Hallister made the decision to develop the site into a center for the visual and performing arts containing performance and exhibition halls, a cafe/library, an on-site organic farm, an education center, a 5000 square foot space dedicated to contemporary dance, and creative studios for artists. In July 2010, the purchase of the site was finalized for a $7 million. Hallister stated that it planned to preserve and boost the property as an arts-friendly community.

In 2010, it was used for filming in the episode "Vatos" of The Walking Dead. In 2012, it was used for The Hunger Games: Catching Fire filming.

In 2025, Goat Farm announced that it would be managing an arts workspace in Georgia Tech's new Creative Quarter development.

== Organization ==
The Goat Farm primarily explores experimental and innovative works. The Arts Center is a for-profit arts model and does not operate on public funding, donations or grants. Ballet and contemporary dance classes are offered through resident dance troupe gloATL. Its education and career development platform, Stimulus Diffusion, connects creatives to a wide variety of educational initiatives in Atlanta. The Goat Farm Arts Center provides its performance and exhibition halls to artists through a curatorial process in which those who wish to use the space submit a proposal. Once an idea is selected, the Goat Farm invests in and works with the artists and/or performance groups to actualize the concept. All of the selected artists receive the Goat Farm's AIP (Arts Investment Package), which includes financial assistance, direct funding, production assistance, marketing assistance and rehearsal, performance, exhibition or classroom space.

== Gallery ==
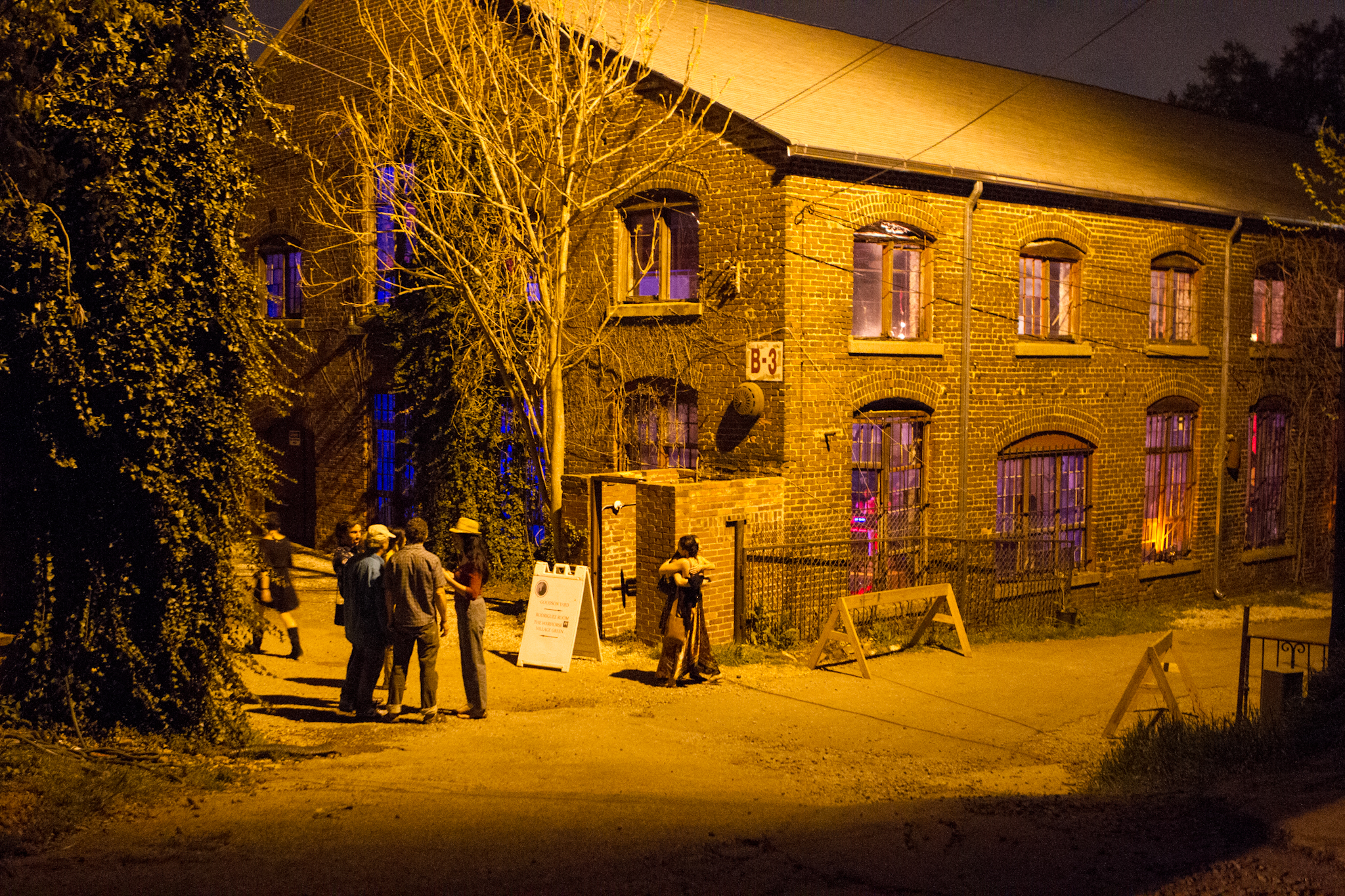
Exterior view

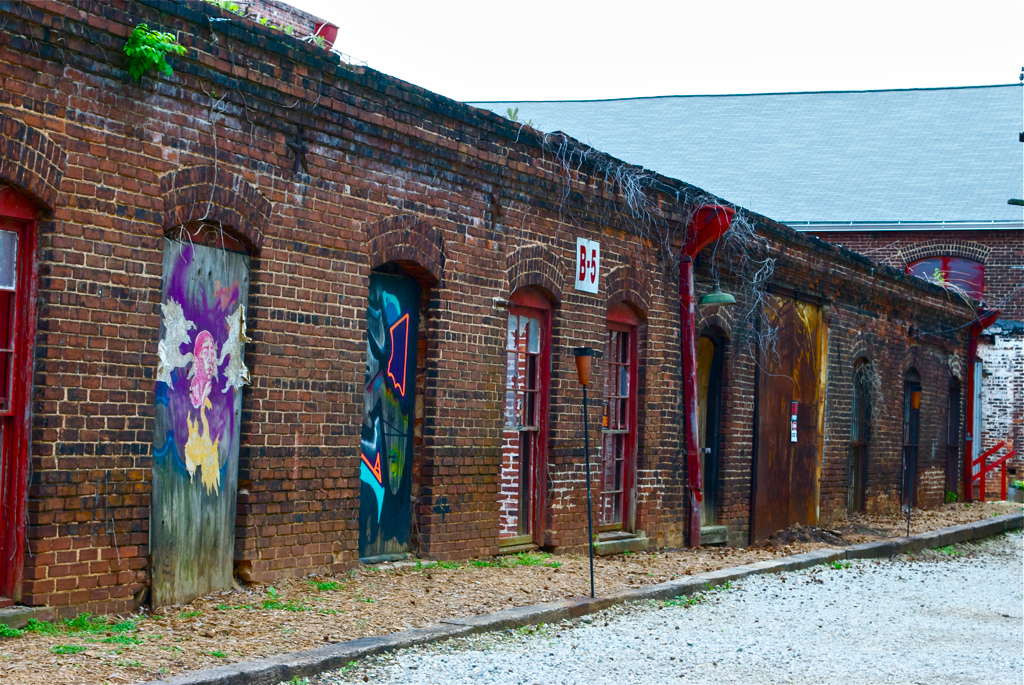

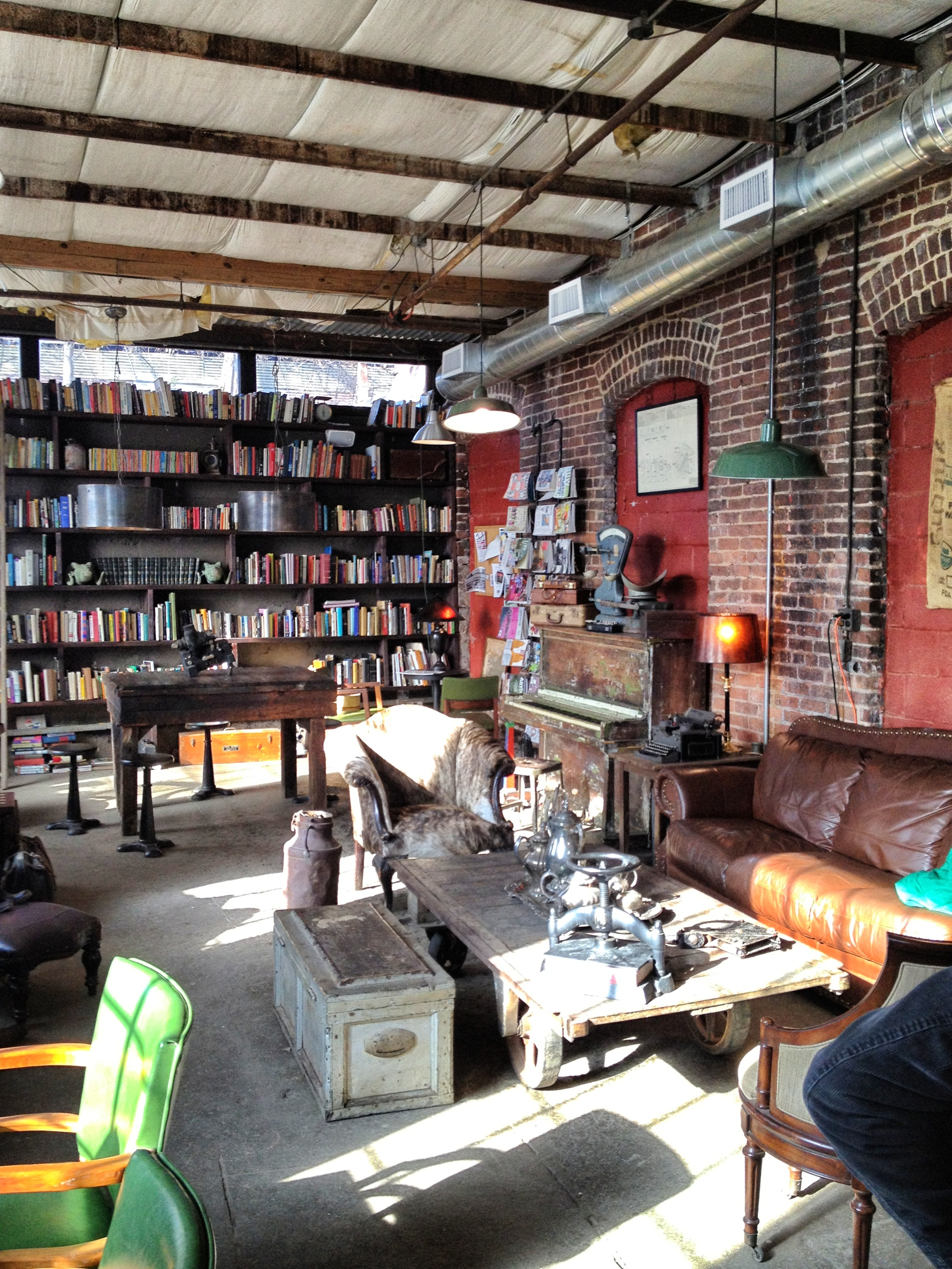
Coffeehouse
