= Westside Provisions =

Neighborhood of Atlanta, Georgia, United States

Coordinates: 33.787163°N 84.411344°W

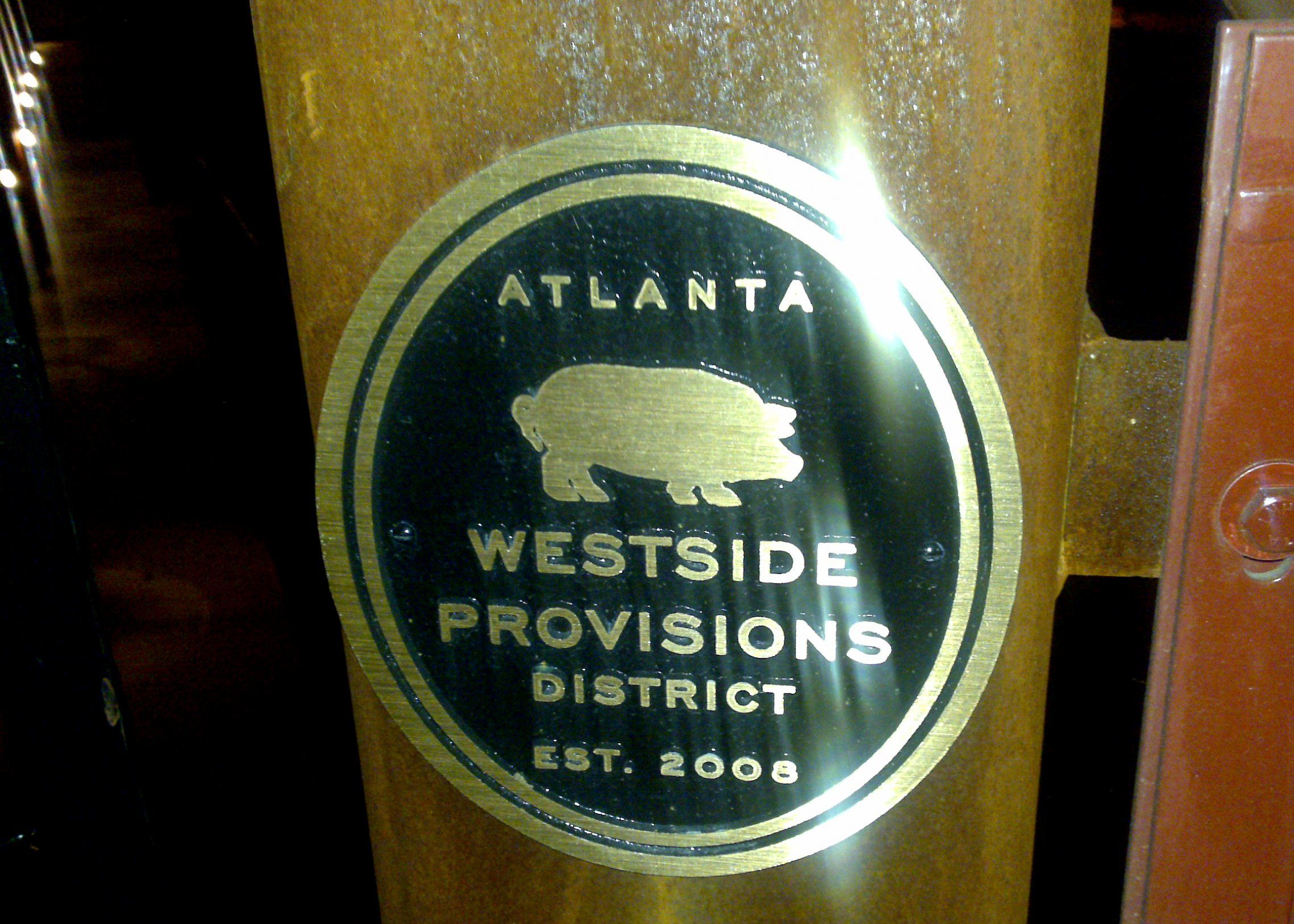
Westside Provisions marker

Westside Provisions is a mixed use neighborhood located in the West Midtown area of Atlanta, Georgia, United States.

== History ==
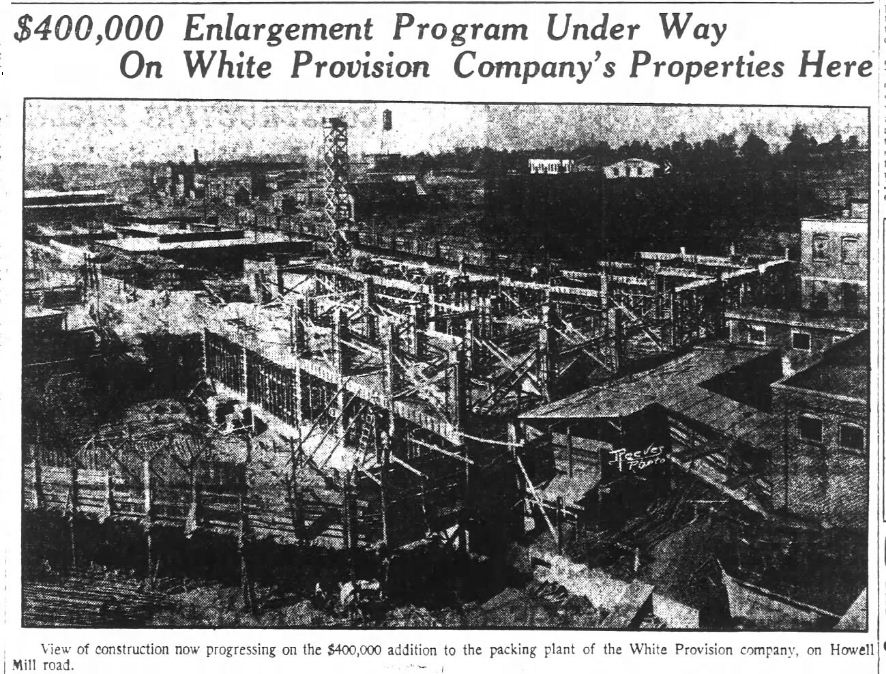
White Provision expansion plans, 1922

Westside Provisions was formed in 2008 by the construction of a footbridge linking the Westside Urban Market to White Provision. White Provision occupies the White Provision Co. building, constructed in 1910 and expanded in 1922–1924 in the Industrial Gothic style. It served as a meatpacking plant and was sold to Swift and Company. In 1963, the property was converted into a bonded warehouse and in 1991 into a U-Haul storage center and as residential lofts. Westside Urban Market is built on the site of the 1917 United Butchers Abattoir, later the site of Stovall and Co. Both the abattoir and meat packing facility were established in proximity to the Miller Union Stockyards, which were located in the area from the 1880s through 1940s.

== Neighborhood features ==
Westside Provisions includes dining and national retailers. For retail, the development is anchored by a large Room & Board furniture store as well as Atlanta's second Anthropologie. The district includes additional restaurants, coffee shops, and high-end home furnishings and apparel stores.
