= Blandtown =

Neighborhood of Atlanta, Georgia

Coordinates: 33.790°N 84.421°W

Blandtown is a neighborhood of the West Midtown area of Atlanta, Georgia. It is located along either side of Huff Road from Howell Mill Road west to Marietta Blvd. It was one of the first black settlements around Atlanta after the Civil War, named for a Black man who owned property. As a community it declined from the 1950s through 1990s, following racially motivated rezoning and a general flight from cities to suburbs. It now forms part of the West Midtown area, a rapidly developing part of Atlanta known for its home furnishings stores, new apartment and condo complexes, restaurants and bars.

== History ==
Blandtown was named for the Black family, born in slavery, who bought the land shortly after the Civil War and held it for decades. Samuel Bland purchased the land in 1872, then willed it to his wife, Mrs. Viney Bland, in 1873. She lost part of the land in 1892 as part of a railroad stock purchase deal. Her son, Felix Bland, acquired the land partly through her will, partly through purchasing land from her, and partly through being willed land by his siblings. Felix Bland and his sister Cherry Osborn eventually sold the land in 1916 and 1918 to R.A. Sims and the Blandtown Christian Church.

A well circulated but untrue narrative in the decades afterward held that Mrs. Viney Bland was a white slaveowner who generously gave Felix Bland the land as well as an education. It also held that Felix Bland lost the land in the 1870s for not paying taxes, and developer Bob Booth acquired title and began building residences.

The area was a hub of development. When the railroad reached the area, industries opened nearby including a mill, a fertilizer factory and a stockyard. The close-knit, mostly black community supported four churches, a public health clinic and more.

In 1928 a fire swept through the area. 15 homes, a church and 2 restaurants burned down and 75 people were left homeless.

Blandtown thrived until the early 1950s. The Norfolk Southern and CSX opened yards there in the area in 1957. In 1959 an elementary school opened and was named after John P. Whittaker, a registrar at Atlanta University.

But in 1956 the city had rezoned the area from residential to heavy industrial, part of a racially motivated effort by white city leaders to disrupt the cluster of Black residences and diminish their voting power. Slowly but surely residents left. In 1960 there were 370 residents, in 1990 72% fewer. The elementary school closed definitively in 1974. By the 1980s local residents fought for rezoning back to residential, and were supported by councilwoman Clair Muller, but Nottingham Chemical and other industrial companies fought them and rezoning was never successful.

The original residential area of Blandtown consisted only of Fairmont and Boyd Aves. and English and Culpepper Streets. These streets are immediately adjacent to a fast-growing West Midtown area of wholesale and retail home furnishings stores and new residential and mixed-use complexes such as the Alexan MetroWest and Apex West Midtown. The area is generally referred to as part of West Midtown; the Blandtown name is almost never used except in a historical context, or to refer to the officially recognized neighborhood unit.

In 1928 Frank Willis purchased several lots on English and Culpepper Streets and built a house of 800 square feet at 990 Culpepper. He lived there with his daughter Nellie Ruth Love and her six children until his death in 1949. The last remaining resident of Blandtown was Joseph Bibbs who lived all his life at the corner of English and Culpepper Street and died in 2004 at age 85. He recalled that in his youth the neighborhood was filled with the smell of the abattoir and fertilizer plant at the north end of English Street. Following Mr. Bibbs' death, all the houses and most of the trees on Fairmont, Culpepper and English Streets were demolished, leaving only the studio of Atlanta artist Gregor Turk (www.gregorturk.com) on English Street and a woodworking studio (www.johnleewoodshop.com) that was built in 2001 on the old Willis homesite. Infrastructure for many new dwellings was laid out but was stalled by the 2008 recession. Building was resumed in 2015, and by 2017 an entire new village was being built of houses marketed at over $500,000.
