= King Plow Arts Center =

Event space in Atlanta, Georgia

- Established: 1991
- Location: 887 W Marietta St NW; Atlanta, Georgia
- Coordinates: 33.782658°N 84.416620°W
- Website: King Plow Arts Center

The King Plow Arts Center is a commercial, performing, and visual arts center located on Marietta Street in the Marietta Street Artery district of West Midtown, Atlanta. King Plow is the largest center of its kind in the city. King Plow is also a popular music venue for concerts and live music shows in Atlanta.

== History ==
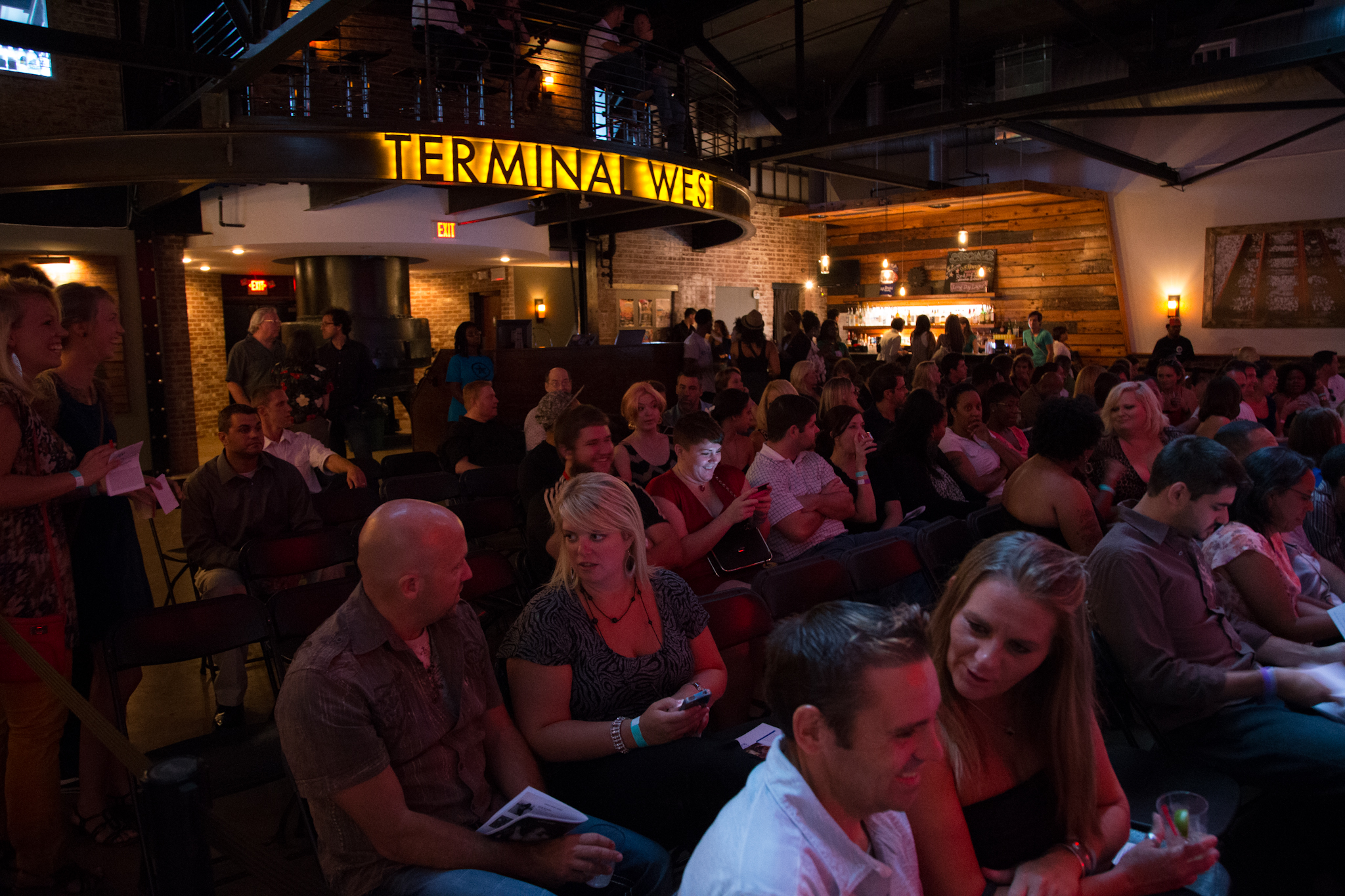
Terminal West

Prior to the construction of the current building in 1902, the Walker-Sims Plow Company operated in buildings on the current site. In that year, Clyde Lanier King and two partners bought the company and renamed it the Atlanta Agricultural Works, in 1906 again to the Atlanta Plow Company and in 1928 to the King Plow Company. In 1936-38 the original plant area was expanded to its present size of 165,000 square feet (15,300 m^{2}). At its zenith the plant employed 300. Sales eventually declined and the factory closed in 1986. In 1990, the owners decided to redevelop the factory into a mixed use arts facility using the historic buildings and provide affordable studios for artists and other creative businesses and individuals.

The project started with 11 separate buildings. The buildings were built at different periods of time throughout the King Plow Company's existence. In addition to the original 165,000 square feet (15,300 m^{2}) in 11 buildings, King Plow purchased an additional five buildings between 1999- 2000, bringing the total area to 16 buildings, on 12.5 acres (5.1 ha) with approximately 256,000 square feet (23,800 m^{2}).

== Terminal West ==
Terminal West, a 7,000-square foot music venue, is located within the King Plow Arts Center. The venue, which includes an outdoor roof deck overlooking historic train tracks, specializes in electronic musical acts, particularly dub step. The venue won a 2012 "Best New Venue" award. As noted in their Creative Loafing award and in Atlanta Magazine's initial write-up, Terminal West has grown to hold shows representing many different genres.

In early 2013, Terminal West expanded to hold a restaurant titled Stationside that served lunch Tuesday - Friday (no longer the case) and dinner any night of a show (still the case).
