= Southern Railway North Avenue Yards Historic District =

Historic district in Georgia, United States

- U.S. National Register of Historic Places
- U.S. Historic district
- Location within Atlanta Location within Georgia Location within the United States
- Location: bordered by Norfolk Southern Railway tracks on the east, North Avenue on the north, Gray Street on the west and John Street on the south.
- Coordinates: 33.767357°N 84.400277°W
- Built: 1925, 1952
- Architectural style: Utilitarian early 20th century railway by Southern Railways in-house architect. Tilt-slab concrete construction.
- NRHP reference No.: 02000539
- Added to NRHP: 2002-07-16

The Southern Railway North Avenue Yards, now repurposed as the NorthYards business park, is located just west of the railway line northwest from downtown Atlanta, south of the Marietta Street Artery neighborhood, rich in industrial history. The Yards represent a microcosm in changes in American railroads over the course of the 20th century.

The Southern Railway Company first established the complex, as early as 1911, as a turntable rail yard. The roundhouse (1925) was once used for assembling and servicing trains and, as offsite warehouses were introduced, it was later adapted for use as a warehouse. During the 1950s and 1960s additional warehouses were built surrounding and connected to the roundhouse.

The Roundhouse at Northyards Business Park was renovated and turned into a business park in 2002 by C.D. Moody Construction and won the 2002 Atlanta Urban Design Commission's Award of Excellence.
