= Garden Hills =

- Garden Hills Historic District
- U.S. National Register of Historic Places
- U.S. Historic district
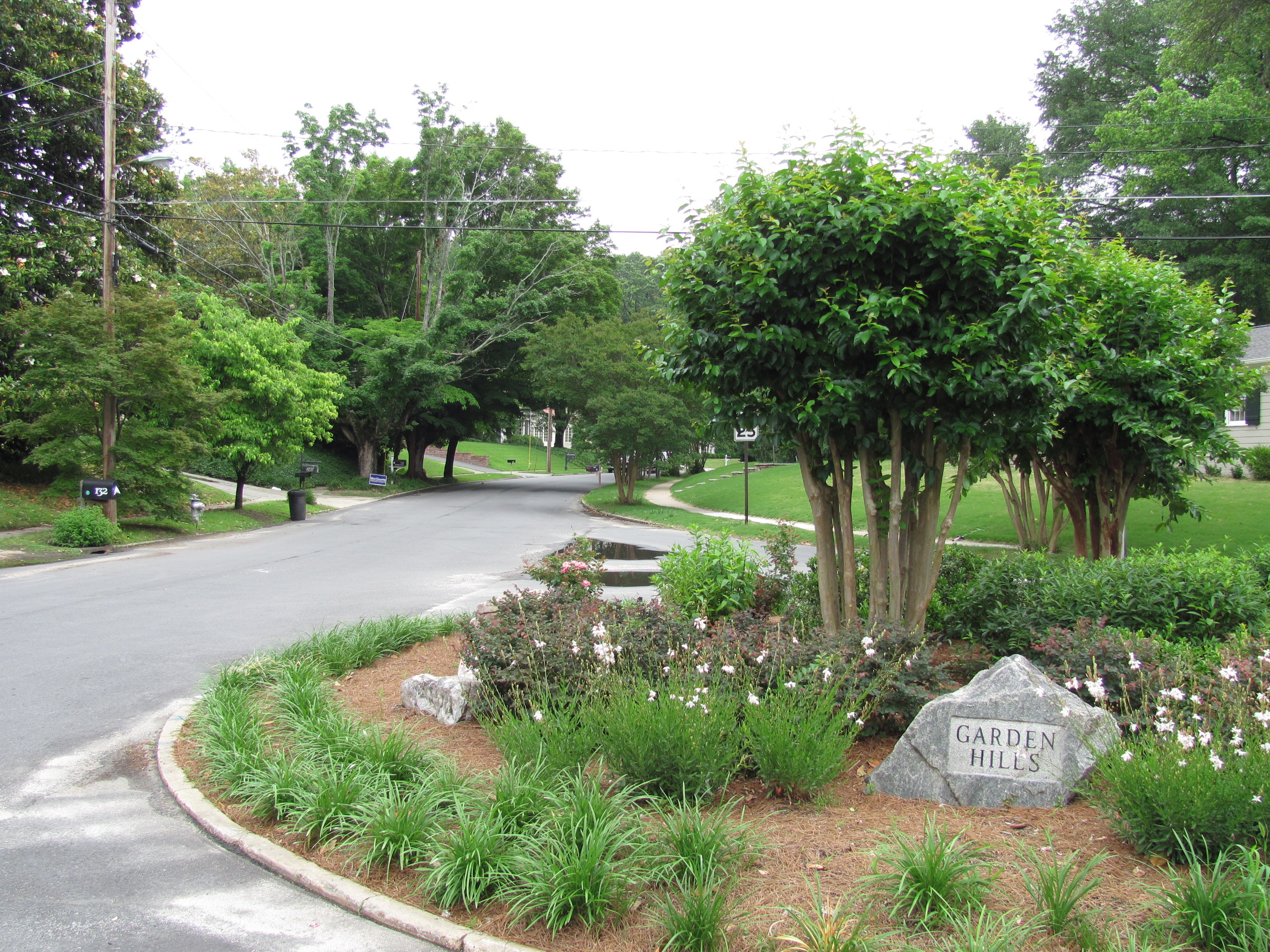
- at the corner of Rumson Road and Rumson Way

- Location within Atlanta Location within Georgia Location within the United States
- Location: Atlanta, Georgia
- Coordinates: 33°49′54″N 84°22′45″W
- Architect: Multiple
- Architectural style: Late 19th And 20th Century Revivals
- NRHP reference No.: 87001362
- Added to NRHP: August 17, 1987

Garden Hills is a neighborhood in the Buckhead section of Atlanta, Georgia between Peachtree and Piedmont Roads, bordered on the north by Pharr Road and on the south by Lindbergh Road. In 1987 the neighborhood was given historic district status by the city of Atlanta.

Garden Hills was developed beginning in 1925 by Phillips Campbell McDuffie, a prominent Atlanta lawyer, who formed the Garden Hills Corp. and advertised the area as "Beautiful Garden Hills." He envisioned a country club community with a pool and community center at its heart.

The neighborhood was planned in three phases: the Country Club section, from Rumson Road east to North Hills Drive including the pool and community center; the Peachtree section, from Peachtree Road to Rumson Road; and the Brentwood section, from North Hills Drive to Piedmont Road.

== Macedonia Park ==
The African American settlement of Macedonia Park was located on the present site of Frankie Allen Park in what is now Garden Hills. The county used eminent domain and other techniques to buy out the black homeowners from 1945 to 1953.

== Schools ==
Christ the King Catholic School on Peachtree Street, as well as Garden Hills Elementary School, and Atlanta International School on North Fulton Drive are located in Garden Hills.

Residents are within Atlanta Public Schools and have the following zoned schools: Garden Hills Elementary School, Sutton Middle School Sutton Middle School, and North Atlanta High School.

The former North Fulton High School is a contributing property of the historic district. It is now used as Atlanta International School.
