= Qwan'tez Stiggers =

American football player (born 2002)

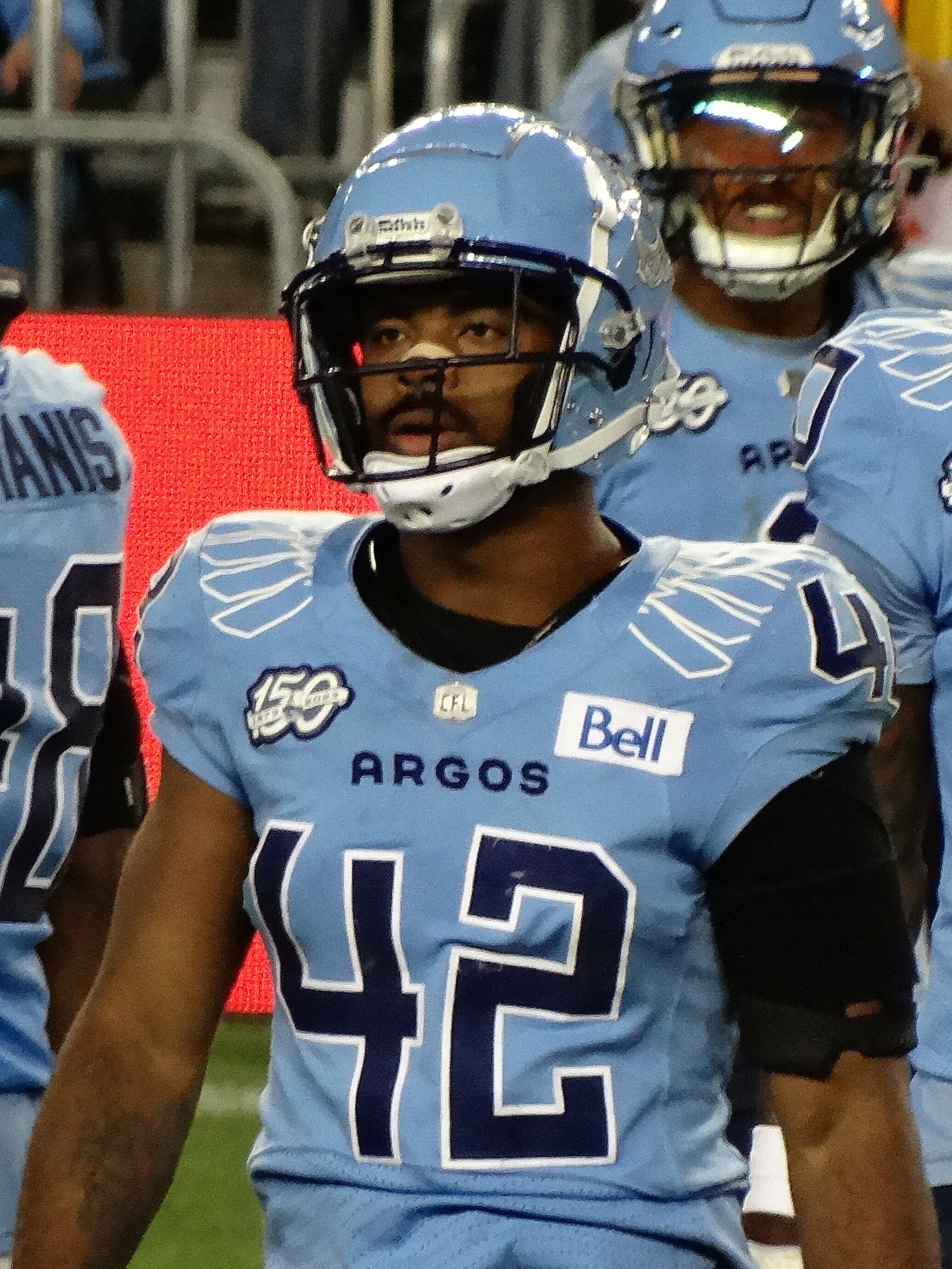
- Stiggers with the Toronto Argonauts in 2023

No. 37 – New York Jets
- Position: Cornerback
- Roster status: Active

Personal information
- Born: January 8, 2002 (age 24); Atlanta, Georgia, U.S.
- Listed height: 6 ft 0 in (1.83 m)
- Listed weight: 197 lb (89 kg)

Career information
- High school: The B.E.S.T. (Atlanta, Georgia)
- College: None
- NFL draft: 2024: 5th round, 176th overall pick

Career history
- FCF Beasts (2022)*; FCF Bored Ape Football Club (2022); Toronto Argonauts (2023); New York Jets (2024–present)
- * Offseason or practice squad member only

Awards and highlights
- CFL Most Outstanding Rookie (2023); CFL East All-Star (2023)

Career NFL statistics as of Week 7, 2026
- Total tackles: 41
- Fumble recoveries: 5
- Pass deflections: 3
- Stats at Pro Football Reference

Career CFL statistics
- Total tackles: 56
- Interceptions: 5
- Stats at CFL.ca

Qwan'tez London Stiggers (born January 8, 2002) is an American professional football cornerback for the New York Jets of the National Football League (NFL). He previously played for the Toronto Argonauts of the Canadian Football League (CFL). Unlike most professional football players, Stiggers did not play college football.

== Early life ==
Stiggers grew up in a family of 13 children and attended The B.E.S.T. Academy high school in Atlanta where he played American football, basketball, and baseball. One of his brothers was almost left as a quadriplegic after a spinal cord accident playing football. Stiggers' father was involved in a serious car accident on February 14, 2020, and later died on September 19, 2020, while Stiggers was a freshman at Lane College in Jackson, Tennessee; his father's death caused him to enter into a significant depression that resulted in him dropping out despite being on a scholarship.

== Professional career ==
=== Fan Controlled Football ===
At the urging of his mother, Stiggers tried out for and signed with Fan Controlled Football (FCF), a livestreaming indoor American football league. He played during the 2022 FCF season and caught the attention of former Toronto Argonauts offensive coordinator Josh Jenkins, who suggested he should try out for the Canadian Football League (CFL).

=== Toronto Argonauts ===
Stiggers signed with the Argonauts of the on January 4, 2023, and attended the team's rookie camp at the University of Guelph later that May. While many expected him to be cut during the preseason due to his lack of college or professional experience, Stiggers made the team's initial regular season roster and also became a regular starter for the Argonauts during his rookie 2023 CFL season, successfully transitioning to play Canadian football. He played in 16 regular season games where he had 53 defensive tackles, three special teams tackles, and five interceptions. By the end of the year, he was chosen as the CFL's Most Outstanding Rookie and as a CFL East All-Star, as well as selected to attend the 2024 East–West Shrine Bowl prior to the 2024 NFL draft.

=== New York Jets ===
Pre-draft measurables
Height	Weight	Arm length	Hand span	Wingspan	40-yard dash	10-yard split	20-yard split	20-yard shuttle	Three-cone drill	Vertical jump	Broad jump
5 ft 11 3/8 in (1.81 m)	203 lb (92 kg)	30 1/2 in (0.77 m)	8 7/8 in (0.23 m)	6 ft 1 3/8 in (1.86 m)	4.45 s	1.52 s	2.50 s	4.32 s	7.03 s	36.0 in (0.91 m)	10 ft 8 in (3.25 m)
All values from East–West Shrine Bowl/Pro Day

Stiggers was selected in the fifth round with the 176th overall pick in the 2024 NFL draft by the New York Jets. He was the first player drafted directly from the CFL since Jermaine Haley in 1999.

On November 30, 2025, Stiggers made his first fumble recovery in the Jets 27–24 win over the Atlanta Falcons.

== NFL career statistics ==
Legend
**Bold**	Career high

=== Regular season ===
Year	Team	Games		Tackles					Interceptions						Fumbles				
Year	Team	GP	GS	Cmb	Solo	Ast	Sck	TFL	Int	Yds	Avg	Lng	TD	PD	FF	Fum	FR	Yds	TD
2024	NYJ	14	1	8	7	1	0.0	0	0	0	0.0	0	0	0	0	0	0	0	0
2025	NYJ	15	4	**27**	**17**	**10**	0.0	**1**	0	0	0.0	0	0	**3**	0	0	**2**	0	0
Career		29	5	35	24	11	0.0	1	0	0	0.0	0	0	3	0	0	2	0	0
