= Truancy Intervention Project, Inc. =

American non-profit organization

Truancy Intervention Project, Inc. (TIP) is a 501 (c)3 non-profit organization serving children ages 5 to 15 declared truant in the Atlanta City and Fulton County public school systems. Founded in 1991 TIP, previously named Kids in Need of Dreams, Inc. (KIND), provides positive intervention services to children reported as truant. It offers at-risk children a second chance at success by pairing them with trained volunteers from the community.

TIP exists as a result of collaboration among various entities, including the Fulton County juvenile court, the Atlanta public school system, The Fulton County public school system, a volunteer base, and community partners (e.g., United Parcel Service, Georgia Bar Association, Families First, Alston & Bird LLP, King & Spalding LLP, etc.)

== Overview ==
Initially, participants in TIP were first-time truants referred to the program as a result of a referral from the Fulton County Juvenile Court, but now, every child who is referred to the court for truancy is paired with a TIP volunteer. Since 2001, TIP has also served children at the school level through its Early Intervention initiative, pairing children and families with volunteers to assist in rectifying the attendance issues before a court referral becomes necessary. Providing children at risk of school failure with volunteer advocates increases their exposure to many social services and other resources, increasing their opportunity for success. Along with preventing school failure, these efforts combat the consequences that go along with it as well. Teen pregnancy, crime, and welfare dependence are all addressed through the mentoring and enrichment programs that TIP provides. More than 300 trained volunteers, both attorneys and non-attorneys, give their time and skills to help these children stay in school.

Since January 1992, thousands of children have been placed in the program. This includes children who have been chronically absent from school and charged with Truancy or, due to their age (11 or younger), their parents have been held responsible for the child's absenteeism and are charged with Educational Neglect.

== TIP in action ==
Truancy usually is a symptomatic behavior of other issues; thus, TIP volunteers determine the root causes of a client's truancy, and then work to resolve those problems and meet client needs so the client can return to school and be successful. The program can assist with meeting daily necessities (e.g., clothing, water, heat, transportation) as well as long-term needs (e.g. drug and psychiatric treatment, tutoring, childcare) of TIP project participants.

Staffed by six probation officers, six program staff members and hundreds of volunteers, more than 600 children were referred during the 2007-2008 school year. TIP's offices are located within the Fulton County Juvenile Court building. The juvenile court is the system empowered to hold children and families accountable for truant behavior. decisions made by the local juvenile court judges are binding on both the child and parent, and therefore give legal weight to recommendations that all parties agree are in the child's best interest.

TIP recruits and trains community volunteers to advocate for the child. Volunteers work with the child and family to ascertain the root cause of the truancy, and to identify and procure services to assist in remedying the problem. Community agencies provide educational services, housing resources, and medical assistance.

== TIP national outreach ==
In 1997, TIP began "exporting" the TIP model to other communities through the state of Georgia and country. TIP staff help implement truancy projects elsewhere by offering training and resource manuals, on-site start-up assistance, and ongoing planning and implementation support.

The following are initial steps in establishing similar initiatives in other communities:

- Establish a steering committee made up of interested entities. The group need not be large but passionate and committed to doing initial planning and research.
- Contact the school board and inquire about existing dropout and truancy statistics, and existing prevention programs.
- Begin to assess the need for a truancy prevention program through informal interviews with key stakeholders in the community, including: school social workers, parents, and students. Gathering preliminary information is an opportunity to elicit the support and commitment of judges, probation officers, schools, parents, and potential volunteers.
- Consider whether a volunteer-based program is appropriate and, if so, whether to use an attorney model or a non-attorney model.

Identify the entity or individual who will assume leadership responsibility for full implementation of the program, including: volunteer recruitment, training and management, and programmatic oversight.

== Awards ==
- National Dropout Prevention Center/Network (NDPC/N)
  - Designated a "model" program
- Vera Institute of Justice
  - 2002 - Designated as an "effective approach to truancy prevention"
- State Bar of Georgia
  - 1993 - William B. Spann Award for providing previously unmet services to the underrepresented
- American Bar Association
  - 1993 - Award of Merit recipient
- In 2003 and 2004 TIP received proclamations from the City of Atlanta, the Fulton County Commission and both Houses of Georgia General Assembly for TIP's innovative, tenured and successful approach to truancy intervention.

== Facts ==
- Since its inception, TIP has served over 8,000 children in the Atlanta and Fulton County region, and touts an impressive 82% cumulative success rate.
- Over 1,300 Atlanta, Georgia volunteers have donated an estimated 160,000 hours of their time to TIP cases
- Since inception, TIP has saved Fulton County over $4.5 million in court-appointed attorney fees alone, not to mention the millions saved because more children are in school and out of trouble.

== See also ==
- National Center for School Engagement
