= North Fulton High School (Georgia) =

- U.S. Historic district – Contributing property
- Location: 2890 North Fulton Drive N.E., Atlanta, Georgia
- Coordinates: 33°50′00″N 84°22′43″W
- Built: 1930
- Architect: Hentz, Adler and Schutze
- Part of: Garden Hills Historic District (ID87001362)
- Designated CP: August 17, 1987

North Fulton High School was a high school in northern Atlanta, Georgia. It was a part of Fulton County Public Schools and then Atlanta Public Schools. It merged into North Atlanta High School in 1991. The building now houses Atlanta International School.

It is a contributing property in the Garden Hills Historic District on the National Register of Historic Places.

== History ==
The Fulton County School Board formed North Fulton High School in September 1920. Population grew rapidly during the 1920s along the Peachtree Road corridor, which was considered the north of the city at that time, and the census tract of Buckhead increased from 2,603 in 1920 to 10,356 in 1930. North Fulton was the first and for a number of years the only high school serving the urban and predominantly affluent Peachtree Road corridor.

The final building opened in 1930.

APS took control of the school in 1952 when the area was annexed into the city of Atlanta.

North Fulton High School started out as a segregated school under the state-mandated system that prevailed until the early 1960s. The school reached a racial balance under the majority-minority program. In the 1970s the school developed a more racially balanced faculty as well.

Through the years, North Fulton acquired a large international student body, and ranked at the top academically. In 1981, North Fulton became the site for the School of International Studies, a magnet program that became nationally recognized. Today this program continues at North Atlanta High School.

Geraldine P. Wright became acting principal in November 1990.

In May 1990 the APS board of directors chose to merge North Fulton into Northside High School to create North Atlanta High because the State of Georgia's Quality Basic Education (QBE) required a high school to have 970 students to get the regular level of funding from the state, but North Fulton had 612 students. Jim Alexander, the president of the Parent Teacher Student Association of the school and a parent of a pupil, felt inspired by Atlanta winning the bid to host the 1996 Summer Olympics to start a campaign to save the school by asking Georgia officials to make North Fulton High exempt from the QBE requirement. The closure went on schedule, with the North Fulton campus closing after hosting the consolidated North Atlanta students for two years; the Northside campus was chosen as the consolidated school location.

The private school Atlanta International School began leasing the facility. In 2013 APS was in the process of selling the building to Atlanta International.

== Student body and attendance zone ==
Nehl Horton of the Atlanta Journal-Constitution wrote that North Fulton High "draws heavily from" the 287-unit Piedmont Court and East Wesley Apartments, known for hosting various waves of refugees, including from the Cuban Revolution, the Vietnam War, and the Soviet–Afghan War; accordingly it at the time had "a well-developed and successful program for international students." In 1987 the Atlanta Zoning Board decided to approve an application to have the property rezoned for higher density use, which would mean demolition.

== Legacy ==
The Eating Club, also nicknamed "The Golden Girls of North Fulton", were a group of alumnae who regularly met at restaurants. The group was active in 1991.
