= Barbara Borin =

First woman sports reporter in Boston

- Born: March 3, 1949 (age 77); Miami, Florida, U.S.
- Occupation: Television sports anchor

Barbara Borin (born March 6, 1949) is an American television sports anchor.

== Early life and education ==
Borin was born on March 6, 1949, in Miami, Florida, to Joe and Dorothy Levine. After attending local schools, she attended Ohio University. She was enrolled in her first theatrical performance class as a toddler and by six, she and her older sister were performing song and dance in the Greater Miami area. Her father, a serious all seasons, all sports fan, watched them with this youngest daughter by his side, teaching her all he knew, play-by-play, about every sport they watched together. As a result, she led the field in sports knowledge when competing for Boston's first female sports broadcasting spot.

== Career ==
Her career in communications began in 1969 as promotions manager for Sonesta Hotels. In April, 1973, 24-year-old Borin was chosen from 200 applicants when WNAC launched its campaign to put the first woman behind their sports desk. She was the contestant adjudged to be "knowledgeable and confident, based on her cool all-or-nothing audition". Borin's interview included her belief that tie games in football and hockey should be ended and that too many athletes, especially in baseball, are "pampered" with overblown injuries.

On September 16, she was refused postgame entry to the dressing room for an O. J. Simpson interview, though many of the players favored her entrance. Simpson agreed to come out of the dressing room for his Borin interview. Despite New England Patriots' coach Chuck Fairbanks' pledge to allow her into the team dressing room for interviews, on October 7, 1973, Borin was denied entry following a scuffle with police. She threatened to sue Fairbanks for reneging on her agreed upon entry as a professional sports reporter. Borin then ran a film on the post-game controversy highlighting her interview with Boston Celtics coach Tom Heinsohn who welcomed her into player locker rooms to perform her job. "I have to conduct my interviews in the players parking lot and that puts me an hour behind my competitors," she argued during her battle for equal "news-gathering" rights.

Borin tried to convince New York Jets Joe Namath to allow her to do her job by meeting him in the locker room by saying: "Don't think of me as a woman! Think of me as a sportscaster." His response was: "It's tough not to think of you as a woman." Barbara's A-list interviews included Bobby Orr, Phil Esposito, Ted Williams, Carl Yastrzemski, John Havlicek, Billie Jean King, Chris Evert, Mickey Mantle, and Don Shula.

Barbara married Walter Dunfey of the Dunfey Hotel chain in 1975 and left broadcasting shortly thereafter. Divorcing the hotel magnate in 1980, she began pursuing activist political interests, spending time in Washington, DC, where she had ties to the Kennedy family as an outgrowth of her former husband's hotelier enterprises. These ties led to several headline rumors that the first Boston female sports anchor and the then divorcing Ted Kennedy were romantically involved.

In 1993, she became one of the sports groundbreakers on the weekly "Sports Gals" talk show on New England's WEEI Sports Channel. Reflecting on having been a female sports pioneer, Franzoso says she's still an all sports fan but believes she "worked in an era when much greater emphasis was on payment for what was done on the field. Now they're paid regardless of how they perform."

Barbara subsequently moved to Portsmouth, New Hampshire and was married to Dan Franzoso, the Director of Golf at Wentworth By The Sea Country Club, who died in 2001 after a four-year battle with brain cancer. She served as Chairman of the New Hampshire Commission on the Arts from 1978 to 1982; Trustee of Theatre By The Sea (now Seacoast Repertory Theatre) from 1975 to 1984; Founding Director of the University of New Hampshire Pro-Am Golf Classic from 1980 to 1990; Founding Director of the New Hampshire Film Bureau, 1979; Corporator, Portsmouth Community Hospital, 1980; Deputy Executive Director, William J. Clinton Presidential Inaugural Committee, 1992; Community Advisory Board of New Hampshire Public Television, 1981-1995; Founding Director, The First Tee of New Hampshire, 2005-2015; Development Committee, Families First Health and Support Center, 2006–Present.

Barbara joined Coldwell Banker Residential Brokerage in Portsmouth in 1982. She currently is with Berkshire Hathaway HomeServices Verani Realty in Portsmouth. She is married to Robert LeGros, a retired attorney, and resides in Portsmouth.
