= North Atlanta =

North Atlanta may refer to a number of places in the Atlanta, Georgia area:

- North Atlanta, the name of an area now forming part of Brookhaven, Georgia, incorporated from 1924 until 1965, and with a census-designated place active until the 2010 U.S. Census
- North Atlanta, a name used to refer to Midtown Atlanta in the late 19th century
- The northern part of the City of Atlanta or of the Atlanta metropolitan area
  - North Atlanta High School, a public high school in Atlanta

== See also ==
- Neighborhoods in Atlanta
