= Coretta Scott King Young Women's Leadership Academy =

Location
- Atlanta, Georgia; United States
- 33.78928°N 84.481064°W

Information
- Type: Public, single-gender (girls and women)
- Motto: "CSKYWLA – To be empowered by scholarship, non-violence, and social change, my sister"
- Established: August 2007
- School district: Atlanta Public Schools- SRT 4
- Principal: Eulonda Washington
- Teaching staff: 41.00 (FTE)
- Grades: 6–12
- Enrollment: 323 (2022–2023)
- Student to teacher ratio: 7.88
- Colors: Pink, white, and brown
- Mascot: Lady Eagles
- Website: https://www.atlantapublicschools.us/cskywla

The Coretta Scott King Young Women's Leadership Academy (CSKYWLA) was opened in Atlanta, Georgia, United States in August 2007. For a short time the academy was simply referred to as "the girls' single gender academy," but it was later named by its first principal, Melody Morgan, in honor of the life and legacy of Coretta Scott King, the civil rights leader and wife of Martin Luther King Jr.

At its inception, the school served girls in grade 6 with plans for expansion to grade 12 by 2014. It graduated its first high school class in 2014. CSKYWLA is a public school in the Atlanta Public Schools system.

Among the staff and students, the acronym for the school's name, CSKYWLA (pronounced "see-skee-WAH-lah"), has been coined as a salutation given the definition "to be empowered by scholarship, non-violence, and social change, my sister."

== Single-gender education ==
CSKYWLA was initiated by Atlanta Public Schools based on the research of Michael Gurian, who asserts that girls and boys have different learning styles. To this effect, teachers at CSKYWLA employ teaching strategies geared toward the general learning styles of girls.

== Curriculum ==
Students at CSKYWLA are immersed in a rigorous academic curriculum, which includes language arts, social studies, and reading. There is also a strong emphasis on math and science, subject areas in which, according to research and tradition, girls tend to struggle more than boys.

=== Connections ===
Students at CSKYWLA have an opportunity to take connections classes, including:

- Art
- Band
- Physical Education
- Math
- Reading
- Dance

=== Extracurricular activities ===
- Basketball
- Debate Club
- Cheerleading
- Cross-Country
- Marching Band
- Softball
- Track and Field

== Special honors ==
Since 2008, sixth grade students at the Coretta Scott King Young Women's Leadership Academy have had the honor of being guest speakers at the annual Martin Luther King Memorial Holiday celebration ceremony at the Ebenezer Baptist Church in Atlanta.

- 2008 – Kia Sims
- 2009 – Tamira Johnson
- 2010 – Brianna Martin
- 2011 – Rim Adem (middle school) and Jasmine Woodard (high school)
- 2012 – Hikemia Hussein (middle school) and Chelsea Burks (high school)
- 2012 – Destiny Gillespie (middle school)
- 2017 – Chloe Evans (middle school)

== Administration ==
The middle school is currently under the leadership of Eulonda Washington (Principal), Dr.King (Assistant Principal).
