= Corinne Stocker Horton =

American elocutionist and newspaper editor

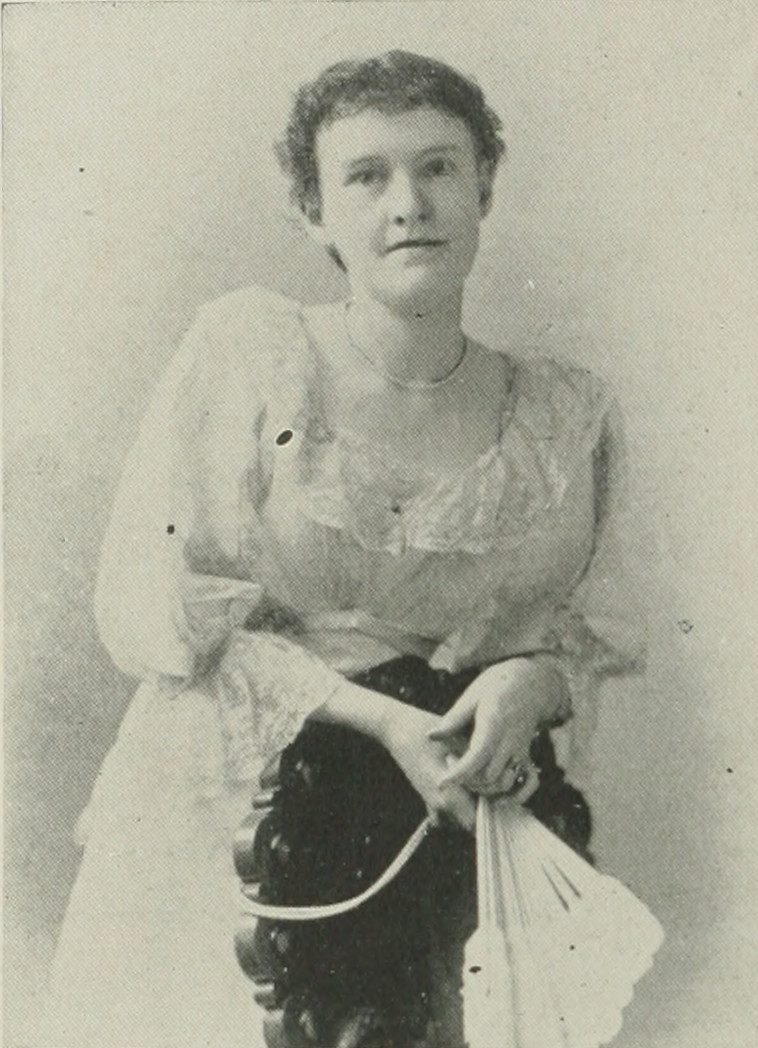
- "A Woman of the Century"
- Born: Corinne R. Stocker; August 21, 1871; Orangeburg, South Carolina, U.S.
- Died: September 12, 1947 (aged 76); Atlanta, Georgia, U.S.
- Other name: "Mrs. Thaddeus Horton"
- Education: College of Music of Cincinnati
- Occupations: elocutionist; journalist; newspaper editor
- Spouses: Thaddeus E. Horton (m. 1896; died 1898); Chauncey Smith (m. 1915; died 1931)
- Writing career
- Language: English
- Subjects: Southern historical people and places

Corinne Stocker Horton (née, Stocker; after first marriage, Horton; after second marriage, Smith; pen name, Mrs. Thaddeus Horton; August 21, 1871 – September 12, 1947) was an American elocutionist, journalist, newspaper editor, and clubwoman. For years, she was the society editor of The Atlanta Journal, but withdrew from the staff after her first marriage. She continued to write for magazines, but was also a successful fiction writer. Horton was affiliated with the Players' Club of Atlanta, the Atlanta Woman's Club, and the Georgia Women's Press Club.

== Early life and education ==
Corinne R. Stocker was born in Orangeburg, South Carolina, August 21, 1871, but Atlanta, Georgia, claimed her by adoption and education. Horton's great-great-grandfather fought under Lafayette to sustain the independence of the American colonies. Her great-grandfather was prominent in the War of 1812. Her grandfather and father both lent their efforts to aid the Southern Confederacy. Her maternal descent was from the French Huguenot.

At an early age, Horton showed a decided histrionic talent. At the age of nine, she won the Peabody medal for elocution in the Atlanta schools, over competitors aged from eight to twenty-five years.

In 1889, having completed a Partial Course at the Girls High School in Atlanta, she was graduated. In that same year, she was placed in the College of Music of Cincinnati, where she established an extraordinary record in the history of the school, completing a four-year course in seven months. Prof. Virgil A. Pinkley, the master of elocution there, wrote of her that among the thousands whom he had known and personally worked with, he found no one who gave surer promise of histrionic greatness.

== Career ==
Her success as a parlor reader and as a teacher of elocution in the South was pronounced. Her classes were large, and she numbered among her pupils some who were themselves ambitious teachers. Her repertoire compassed a wide range of literature, from Marie Stuart and Rosalind to Elizabeth Stuart Phelps Ward's Madonna of the Tub and James Whitcomb Riley's baby-dialect rhymes. After the first year of teaching, Horton gave up her classes, but continued her elocutionary studies and gave frequent parlor readings.

For several years she was on the editorial staff of The Atlanta Journal. Besides numerous articles in periodicals, most of them dealing with Southern historical characters and places, Horton published The Georgian Architecture of the Far South (1902). She made an exhaustive study of architectural types and furnished to the magazines many articles illustrated from photographic views which she took. These articles and photographs appeared as the leading features of the three last volumes of The Georgian Period, a work on the colonial architecture of the U.S. published in twelve volumes by the American Architect and News Company, of Boston. Mrs. Horton has a novel almost finished which, though short, is said to be both original and clever. In addition to the pen name of "Mrs. Thaddeus Horton", she also wrote in the name of Corinne Horton.

In 1909, she organized the Players' Club of Atlanta. Horton was the first Recording Secretary of the Atlanta Woman's Club, and also served as a member of the Managing Board of the Georgia Women's Press Club.

== Personal life ==
On June 17, 1896, she married Thaddeus E. Horton. She was widowed two years later. At the time of his death, he was the Albany, Georgia correspondent of The New York Times.

On February 28, 1915, at Atlanta, she married Chauncey Smith, of Atlanta and Cambridge, Massachusetts. She was widowed again in 1931.

Following a long illness, Horton died at a private hospital in Atlanta, September 12, 1947.

== Selected works ==
=== Books ===
- 1902, The Georgian Architecture of the Far South

=== Articles ===
- 1896, "The Jefferson Davis Museum"
- 1896, "Northern Veterans Making Southern Homes"
- 1896, "Lincoln Museum at Washington"
- 1898, "Library Schools. The New Profession for Men and Women — What New York State Is Doing."
- 1899, "Albany Library School, Illustrated."
- 1903, "An Order of Old-Fashioned Women"
- 1904, "Camden Gardens"
- 1904, "Georgian Houses of the Far South"
- 1905, "Old Charleston Gateways"
- 1905, "Two Storey Galleries in the South"
- 1905, "Old Bullach Hall, Roswell, Georgia"
- 1906, "Some Old Beds"
- 1907, "Charleston And Early American Art"
- 1907, "Letters from Henry Clay to Madame Le Vert"
- 1907, "Madame Le Vert and Her Friends"
- 1908, "The Summer Home of a Georgian"
