= Atlanta Public Schools =

Education organization in Atlanta, United States

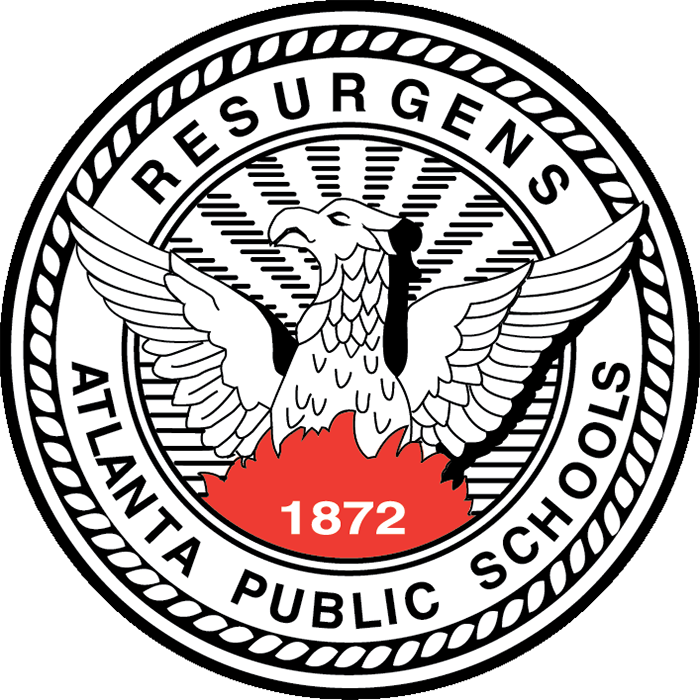

Location
- 130 Trinity Avenue Southwest; Atlanta, GA 30303-3694 United States
- Coordinates: 33.748401°N 84.391485°W

District information
- Type: Public
- Motto: "Making a Difference"
- Grades: Pre-kindergarten – 12
- Established: 1872
- Superintendent: Bryan Johnson
- Budget: $1.127 billion
- NCES District ID: 1300120

Students and staff
- Students: 50,325 (2022–23)
- Faculty: 3,979.90 (FTE)
- Staff: 4,983.40 (FTE)
- Student–teacher ratio: 12.64

Other information
- Telephone: (404) 802-3500
- Website: atlantapublicschools.us

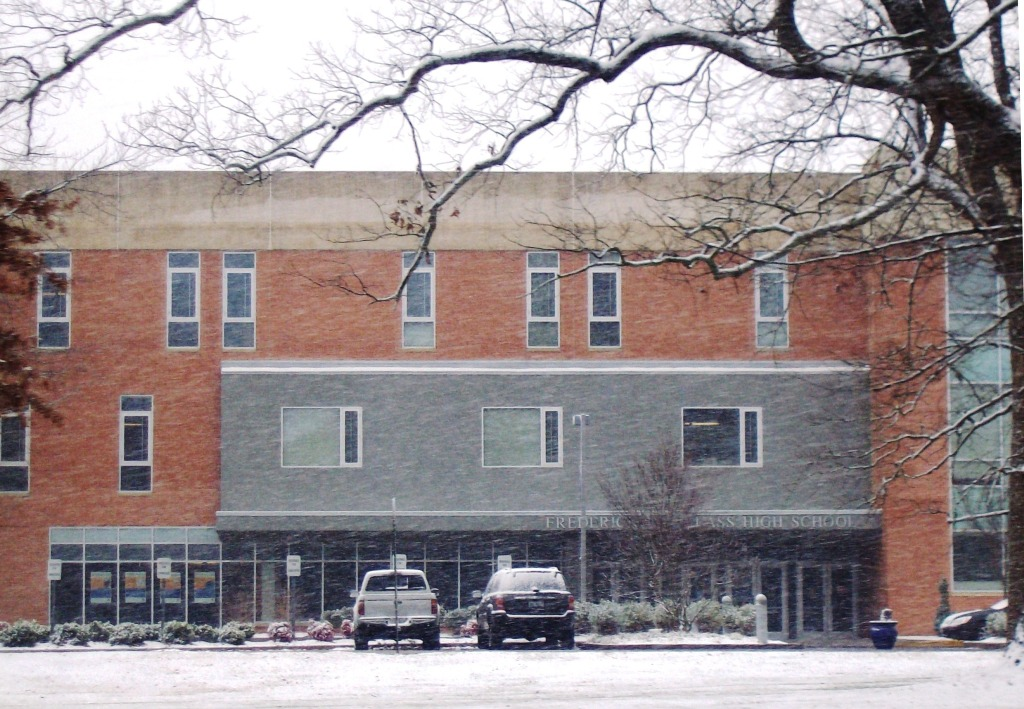
Frederick Douglass High School

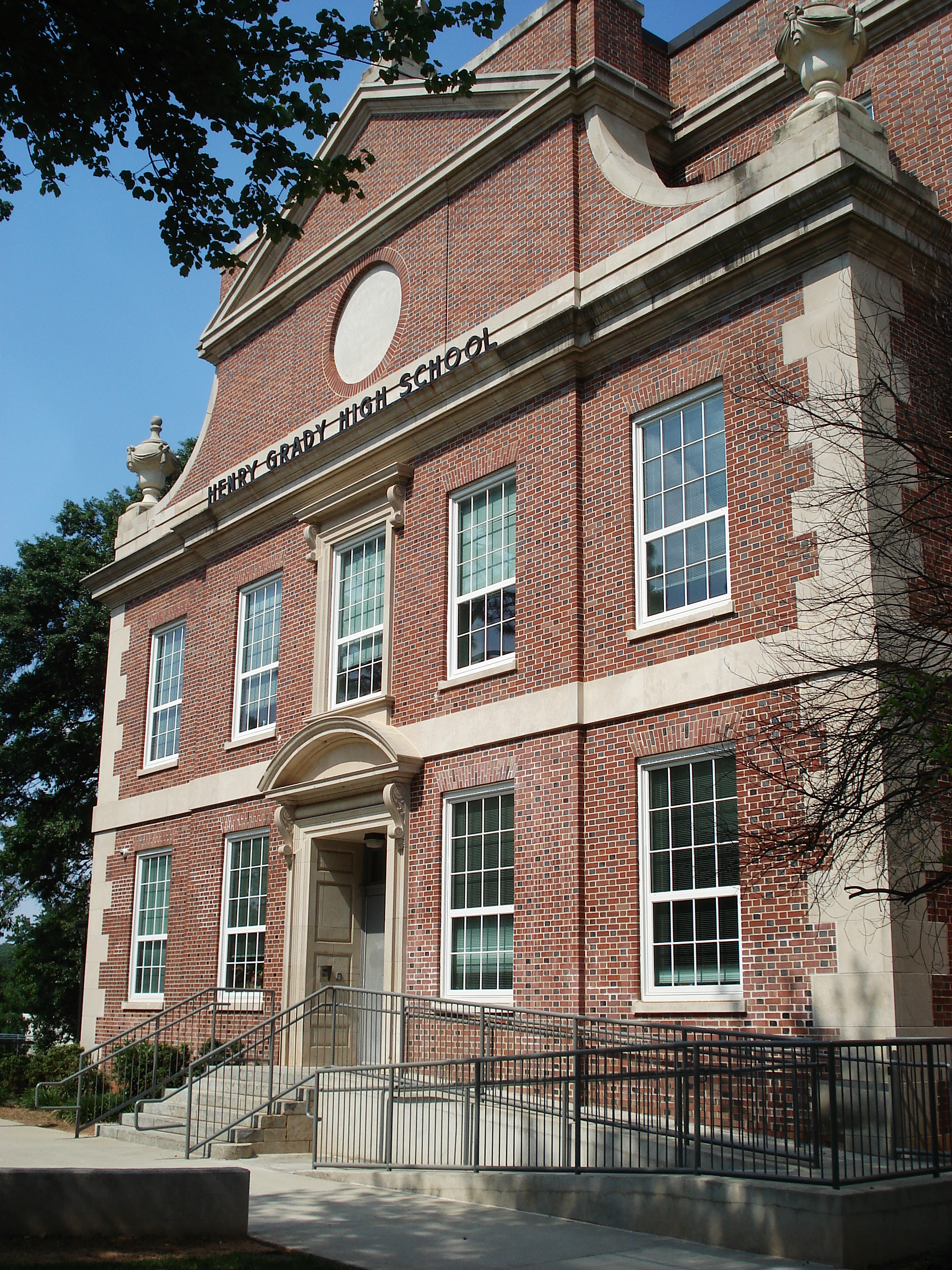
Midtown High School

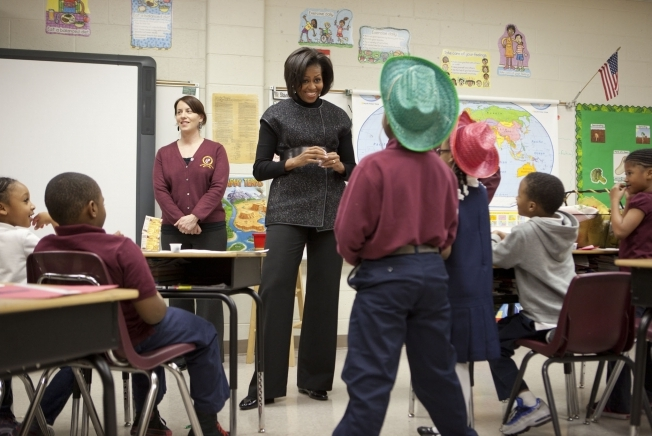
First Lady Michelle Obama visits Burgess-Peterson Academy, February 9, 2011.

Atlanta Public Schools (APS) is a school district based in Atlanta, Georgia, United States. It is run by the Atlanta Board of Education with Superintendent Dr. Bryan Johnson. The system has an active enrollment of approximately 50,000 students, attending a total of 103 school sites: 50 elementary schools (three of which operate on a year-round calendar), 15 middle schools, 21 high schools, four single-gender academies and 13 charter schools. The school system also supports two alternative schools for middle and/or high school students, two community schools, and an adult learning center.

The school system owns the license for, but does not operate, the radio station WABE-FM 90.1 (the National Public Radio affiliate) and the Public Broadcasting Service (PBS) public television station WABE-TV 30.

== History ==
=== Before 1900 ===
On November 26, 1869, the Atlanta City Council passed an ordinance establishing the Atlanta Public Schools. On January 31, 1872, the first three grammar schools for white students (Crew Street School, Ivy Street School, Walker Street School) opened, and the existing grammar schools for black students (Summer Hill School and Storr's School) established by the Freedman's Bureau in 1866 and supported by the Northern Missionary Societies, were merged into the holdings of the Atlanta Public Schools. The capacity of each school was 400 students, although the inaugural registration was 1839 students, 639 students over the capacity. In addition, two high schools, divided by sex, were formed for white students, Boys High and Girls High. These initial schools were based on a census of school aged (ages 6–18) children called for by the inaugural Board of Education. That survey reported in October 1870 that there were 3,345 white children (1,540 boys and 1,805 girls) and 3,139 black children (1,421 boys and 1,728 girls) for a total potential student body of 6,484.

the districts for the white grammar schools were divided as follows,

- Crew Street School, The second and third wards, including that portion of the city lying between Whitehall street and the Georgia Railroad
- Ivy Street School, the fourth, fifth, and seventh wards, bounded by the Georgia Railroad and the Western & Atlantic Railroad
- Walker Street School, first and sixth wards, including that portion of the city west of Whitehall street and the Western & Atlantic railroad.

The initial monetary support from the Atlanta City Council was limited. Although a bond had been called for and approved through vote by the residents, there were not yet funds and so the Board of Education had to approach the City Council to cover the purchase of the land, the construction of the buildings, the salaries of the teachers, as well as books to teach from. The first salary budget, dated December 9, 1871, was for twenty-seven teachers, and totaled $21,250. Grade school teachers were paid $450-$800 a year, while principals were paid $1,500 and the superintendent was paid $2,000.

The organization of the schools was a traditional 8-4 arrangement which consisted of 8 years of grammar school for students aged 6 to 14, and 4 years of high school for students aged 14–18. The grades began at eighth for first year students, and students progressed through to the first grade as year eight students of grammar school. The established curriculum for grammar school was, Spelling, Reading, Writing, Geography, Arithmetic (Mental and Written), Natural History, Natural Science, English Grammar, Vocal Music (it was later decided not offer this), Drawing, Composition, History, Elocution. High school curriculum was Orthography, Elocution, Grammar, Physical Geography, Natural Philosophy, Latin, Greek (boys only), Algebra, Geometry, Composition, Rhetoric, English Literature, French or German, Physiology, Chemistry, and a review of grammar school studies.

During 1872 three additional grammar schools for white students (Luckie Street, Decatur Street, and Marietta Street) and an additional grammar school for black students (Markham Street School) were instituted to meet demand. This first year saw 2,842 students served by the schools.

By 1896 there were a total of twenty-two schools, fifteen grammar schools for white students, five grammar schools for black students, and two high schools for white students.

=== Expansion ===
On January 1, 1952, thirty-eight schools that began under Fulton County Schools came under the authority of Atlanta Public Schools following the Plan of Improvement annexation executed by Atlanta Mayor William B. Hartsfield. These schools included five segregated high schools: Henry McNeal Turner and Hapeville, which served black students, and Fulton, North Fulton, Northside, Southwest, and West Fulton, which served white students. The primary schools added on this date were Anderson Park, Benton, Blanton, Bolton, Morris Brandon, John Carey, Carter, Cascade, Center Hill, Chattahoochee, Lena H. Cox, Goldsmith, Margaret Fain, Mount Vernon, Hunter Hills, Garden Hills, R. L. Hope, E. P. Howell, Humphries, Lakewood Heights, Mayson, New Hope, Perkerson, Philadelphia, E. Rivers, Rockdale, Rock Spring, West Haven, William Scott, South Atlanta, and Thomasville.

=== Integration ===
On August 30, 1961, nine students – Thomas Franklin Welch, Madelyn Patricia Nix, Willie Jean Black, Donita Gaines, Arthur Simmons, Lawrence Jefferson, Mary James McMullen, Martha Ann Holmes and Rosalyn Walton – became the first African American students to attend several of APS's all-white high schools.

On September 8, 1961, Time magazine reported:

Last week the moral siege of Atlanta (pop. 487,455) ended in spectacular fashion with the smoothest token school integration ever seen in the Deep South. Into four high schools marched nine Negro students without so much as a white catcall. Teachers were soon reporting "no hostility, no demonstrations, the most normal day we've ever had." In the lunchrooms, white children began introducing themselves to Negro children. At Northside High, a biology class was duly impressed when Donita Gaines, a Negro, was the only student able to define the difference between anatomy and physiology. Said she crisply: "Physiology has to do with functions."

In a 1964 news story, Time would say, "The Atlanta decision was a gentle attempt to accelerate one of the South’s best-publicized plans for achieving integration without revolution."

By May 1961, 300 transfer forms had been given to black students interested in transferring out of their high schools. 132 students actually applied; of those, 10 were chosen and 9 braved the press, onlookers, and insults to integrate Atlanta's all-white high schools.

Brown vs. the Board of Education of Topeka had established the right of African American students to have equal opportunities in education, but it was not until 1958, when a group of African American parents challenged the segregated school system in federal court, that integration became a tangible reality for students of color in Atlanta.

Adding to the accolades for the students and the city, President Kennedy publicly congratulated residents during an evening address and asked other cities to "look closely at what Atlanta has done and to meet their responsibility... with courage, tolerance and above all, respect for the law."

1970s. Compromise Desegregation Plan. In January 1972, in order to settle several federal discrimination and desegregation lawsuits filed on behalf of minority students, faculty, and employees and reach satisfactory agreement with Atlanta civil rights leaders who had worked over a decade for a peaceful integration plan. Atlanta Public Schools entered into a voluntary agreement called the Compromise Plan with the U.S. Department of Education along with approval and oversight from the U.S. Department of Justice to fully desegregate Atlanta Public Schools. In the late 1960s and early 1970s, a majority of Atlanta Northside public schools had either token integration, or none at all. Faculty and staff assignments to schools had remained mostly segregated as well.

The Justice department reviewed the school system plan consisting of Partial district (Reverse) Busing for the Northside area.. Voluntary and "M to M" (Minority to Majority) transfers; Redrawing attendance zones, Closing outdated and underutilized schools, Building new schools, Mandating and implementing equal employment opportunity guidelines for hiring, training, promotion, assignment, staffing, compensation, vendor selection, bidding, contracting, construction, procurement and purchasing. The school system was also converted from a K-7 elementary and 8-12 high school grade system into a middle school 6–8 grade program beginning with the 1973/1974 school year. The curriculum was also updated to have studies more balanced, inclusive, and diverse, with content culturally and historically significant to racial minorities. On April 4, 1973 after final review authorization orders were issued from the Federal Courts clearing the way for the Compromise Plan of 1973 to be immediately implemented bringing full integration to APS.

With strict guidelines, oversight and timeline implementation of the voluntary desegregation plan, the federal courts agreed not to order and enforce system-wide a mandatory busing desegregation program for APS that had been federally enforced in other cities up to that time, most notably Boston and Philadelphia which resulted in widespread anti-busing violence in 1973-74 that Atlanta civil rights leaders desired to avoid. Along with the Compromise program for racial balance, After a year long Search Atlanta's first African American School Superintendent, Dr. Alonzo A. Crim, was Appointed taking leadership of Atlanta Public Schools in August 1973. He remained superintendent until his retirement in 1988.

=== 21st century ===
The City of Atlanta, in 2017, agreed to annex territory in DeKalb County, including the Centers for Disease Control and Emory University, effective January 1, 2018. In 2016 Emory University made a statement that "Annexation of Emory into the City of Atlanta will not change school districts, since neighboring communities like Druid Hills will still be self-determining regarding annexation." By 2017 the city agreed to include the annexed property in the boundaries of APS, a move decried by the leadership of the DeKalb County School District as it would take taxable property away from that district. In 2017 the number of children living in the annexed territory who attended public schools was nine. The area ultimately went to APS; students in the area were rezoned to APS effective 2024; they were zoned to DeKalb schools before then. Subsequent to this annexation, the State Legislature enacted a law that limited any future annexations in DeKalb by the city of Atlanta to changes only in municipal governance and specifically prohibited changes in school governance as a result of such annexations.

In 2023, APS increased its budget to a record $1.66 billion and its spending-per-student amount to $22,692 which is about double the state and national public school average.

==== Cheating scandal ====
During the 11-year tenure of former superintendent Beverly Hall, the APS experienced unusually high gains in standardized test scores, such as the Criterion-Referenced Competency Test. In 2009, Hall won the National Superintendent of the Year Award. Around this time, the Atlanta Journal-Constitution began investigating the score increases and suggested evidence of cheating. A state report found numerous erased answers in an analysis of the 2009 test scores. Tests were administered under much higher scrutiny in 2010, and the scores dropped dramatically.

The state of Georgia launched a major investigation as cheating concerns intensified. The investigation's report, published in July 2011, found evidence of a widespread cheating scandal. At least 178 teachers and principals at 44 APS schools were alleged to have corrected students' tests to increase scores, in some cases holding "cheating parties" to revise large quantities of tests. Hall, who had retired in June 2011, expressed regret but denied any prior knowledge of, or participation in, the cheating. The new superintendent, Erroll Davis, demanded the resignation of the 178 APS employees or else they would be fired. The revelation of the scandal left many Atlantans feeling outraged and betrayed, with Mayor Kasim Reed calling it "a dark day for the Atlanta public school system." The scandal attracted national media coverage.

==== Restructuring ====
In August 2025, APS reported an enrollment of approximately 50,000 students, despite having the capacity to serve up to 70,000. Over the past three decades, enrollment has steadily declined, particularly in the city’s west and south sides. To address this, consolidation and restructuring efforts are planned by 2030 to save costs and increase enrollment at underutilized schools. Additionally, proposals have been made to repurpose closed schools as community hubs or housing for teachers.

== Environmental record ==
In 2016, after the Flint, Michigan, water crisis, Atlanta Public Schools tested the water fountains and sinks in all 113 of its buildings for lead, though no federal or Georgia law required it to. The $200,000 round found at least one fixture above 15 parts per billion, the level that triggers action by water utilities, in nearly 40 percent of schools. A classroom sink at Coretta Scott King Young Women's Leadership Academy, which had opened in 2010, measured 286 parts per billion. After the district replaced faucets and fountain fixtures and installed filters, retests cleared every source, though follow-up tests still found lead at 2 to 11 parts per billion in at least 25 buildings. The district has since tested every source on a five-year cycle; the 2021 round turned up 298 fixtures that failed at first and passed after repairs.

A 2021 WSB-TV investigation found through open records that the district was among several in metro Atlanta that had installed bipolar ionization air cleaners in some buildings. Indoor air quality experts had urged school districts to disconnect such devices, saying there was not enough evidence that they worked. Charles R. Drew Charter School was named a U.S. Department of Education Green Ribbon School in 2018. In October 2022 the Environmental Protection Agency awarded the district $9,875,000 under its Clean School Bus Program, money that went toward its first 25 electric buses, built by Lion Electric. By April 2025, 23 were on the road, and the district planned to replace its whole fleet with electric buses.

The Atlanta Track Club proposed the Cheney Olympic Legacy Complex in 2026, a $100 million indoor track facility on district-owned land at Cheney Stadium in Summerhill, under a 50-year lease. Plans call for a 175,000-square-foot building and surface parking next to the existing outdoor track, which would stay. The site is where the city had planned the Connally vault, designed to hold around 7 million gallons of stormwater and take pressure off aging pipes. That project stalled, and the city is building a 20-million-gallon vault in Peoplestown. Residents and environmental advocates, among them leaders of the South River Watershed Alliance and Georgia WAND, questioned how committed the city was to addressing flooding that has long plagued the area's Black neighborhoods. The club added green space to its plans, and project engineers said the old pipes under the site would be enlarged. Its chief executive, Rich Kenah, said the club would not move forward without clarity from "the city of Atlanta that they do not need a vault on this site". In August 2026 the district said discussions were preliminary and no final decisions had been made.

== Governance ==
The Atlanta Board of Education establishes and approves the policies that govern the Atlanta Public School system. The board consists of nine members, representing six geographical districts, and three "at-large" districts. One person is elected per district to represent the schools in a given district for a four-year term. Under the provisions of the new board charter, approved by the Georgia Legislature in 2003, board members elect a new chairman and vice chairman every two years. The day-to-day administration of the school district is the responsibility of the superintendent, who is appointed by the board.

== School board members ==
- District 1 - Katie Howard
- District 2 - Aretta Baldon
- District 3 - Dr. Ken Zeff
- District 4 - Jennifer McDonald, Vice Chair
- District 5 - Erika Mitchell, Chair
- District 6 - Tolton Pace
- Seat 7 - Alfred Shivy Brooks
- Seat 8 - Cynthia Briscoe Brown
- Seat 9 - Jessica Johnson

== APS leadership ==
2024-2025 school year

- Dr. Bryan Johnson, Superintendent
- Erica Long, Deputy Superintendent
- Tommy Usher, Chief of Schools
- Nicole Lawson, Chief Human Resources Officer
- Dr. Lisa Bracken, Chief Financial Officer
- Dr. Matthew Smith, Chief Performance Officer
- Sherri Forrest, Chief Academic Officer
- Larry Hoskins, Chief Operations Officer
- Travis Norvell, Chief Strategy & Engagement Officer
- Dorna Werdelin, Chief Communications Officer

== Schools ==
=== High schools ===
- Benjamin E. Mays High School
- BEST Academy High School
- Booker T. Washington High School
- Coretta Scott King Young Women's Leadership Academy High School
- Daniel McLaughlin Therrell High School
- Frederick Douglass High School
- Maynard H. Jackson High School
- Midtown High School
- The New Schools at Carver
  - Early College
  - School of the Arts
  - School of Health Sciences & Research
  - School of Technology
- North Atlanta High School
- South Atlanta High School

=== Middle schools ===
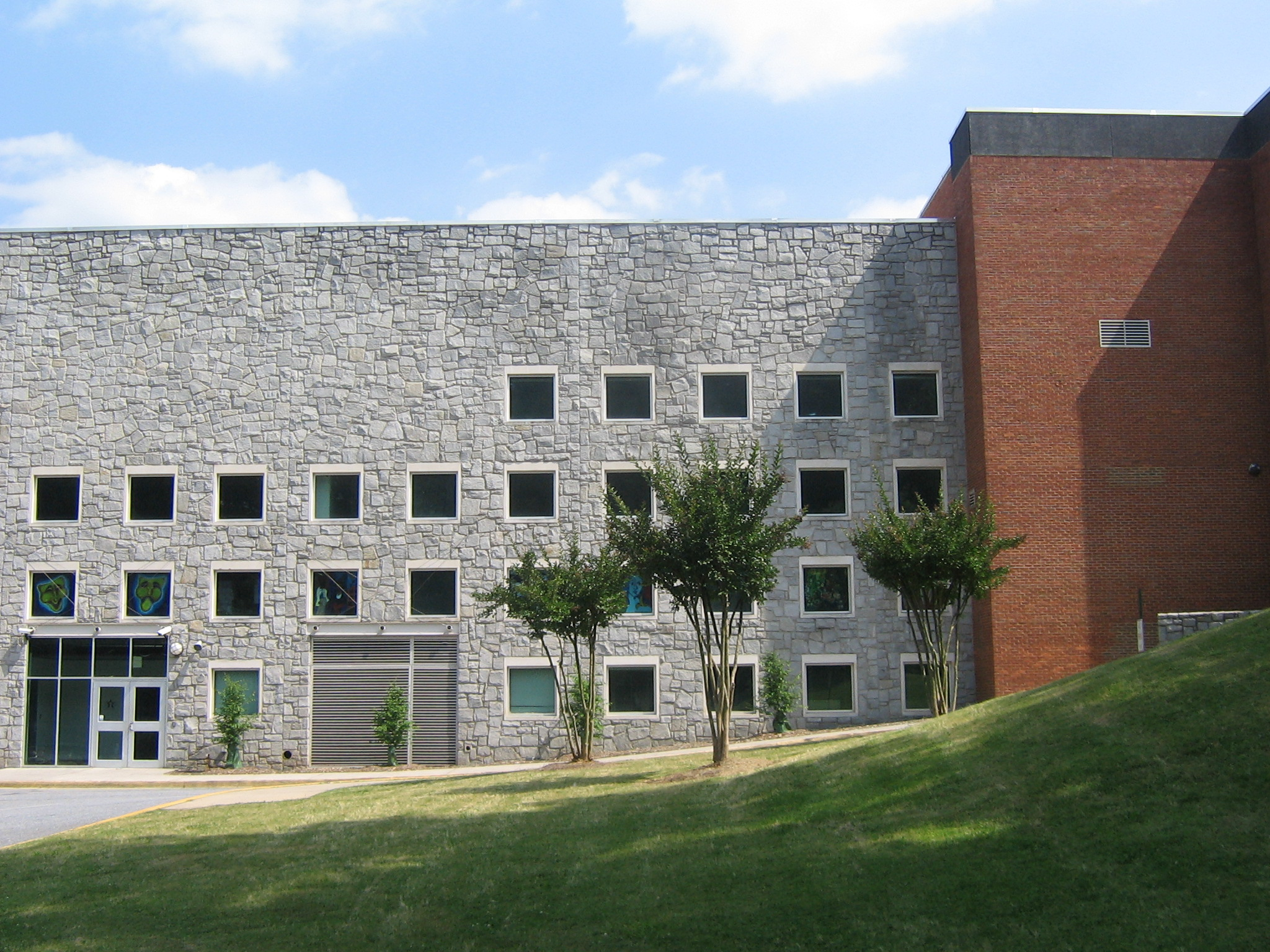
Former North Atlanta High School campus (now Sutton Middle School)

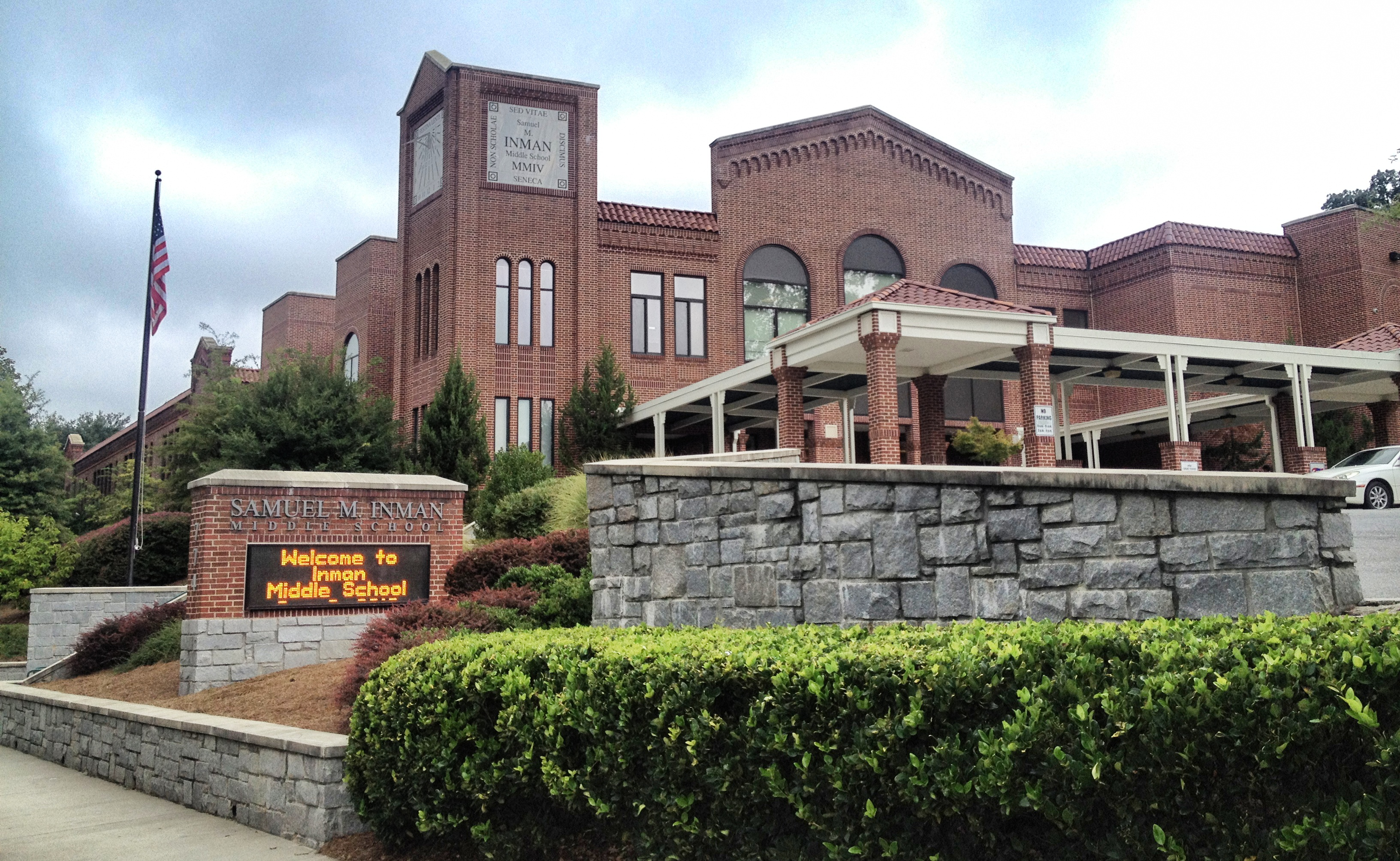
Inman Middle School in the Virginia-Highland neighborhood

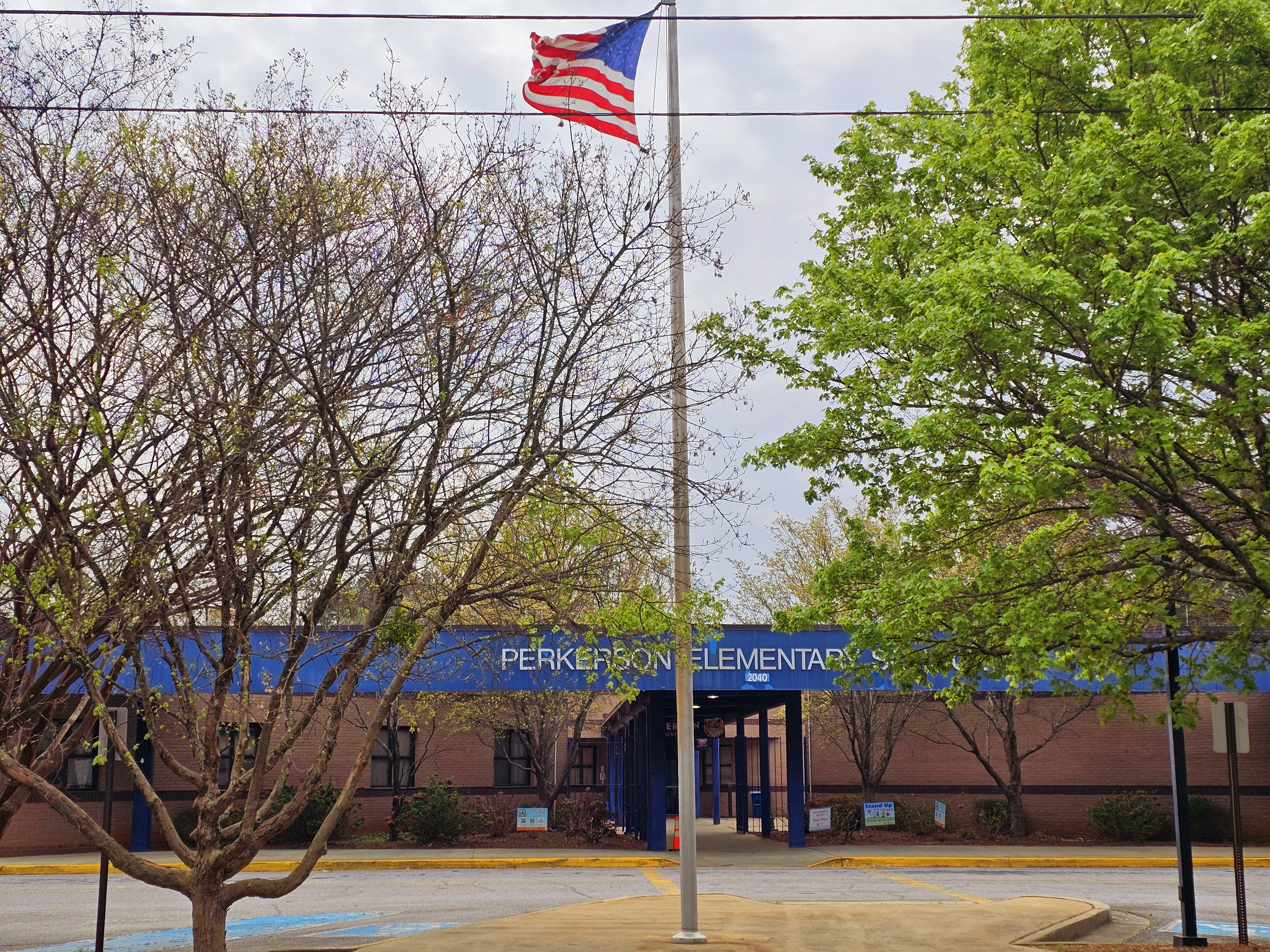
Perkerson Elementary School in the Sylvan Hills neighborhood

- BEST Academy Middle School
- Coretta Scott King Young Women's Leadership Academy Middle School
- Crawford Williamson Long Middle School
- Jean Childs Young Middle School
- Herman J. Russell West End Academy
- Luther Judson Price Middle School
- Martin Luther King Jr. Middle School
- Ralph Johnson Bunche Middle School
- Samuel M. Inman Middle School (now David T. Howard Middle School)
- Sylvan Middle School
- Wills A. Sutton Middle School

=== Elementary schools ===
- The Kindezi School (Charter School in partnership with the District)
- Barack & Michelle Obama Academy (formerly DH Stanton Elementary)
- Beecher Hills Elementary School
- Benteen Elementary School
- Bethune Elementary School
- Bolton Academy 1993-Current. (Bolton Elementary School 1937-1973. Fulton County until 1952)
- Boyd Elementary School
- Brandon Elementary School
- Burgess/Peterson Academy
- Cascade Elementary School
- Centennial Academy Elementary School
- Cleveland Avenue Elementary School
- Continental Colony Elementary School
- Deerwood Academy
- Dobbs Elementary School
- Dunbar Elementary School
- Fickett Elementary School
- Finch Elementary School
- Frank Lebby Stanton Elementary School
- Fred A. Toomer Elementary School
- Flat Rock Elementary School
- Garden Hills Elementary School
- Gideons Elementary School
- KIPP Woodson Park Academy
- Harper-Archer Elementary School
- Heritage Academy
- Hope-Hill Elementary School
- Humphries Elementary School
- Hutchinson Elementary School
- Jackson Elementary School
- Kimberly Elementary School
- M. Agnes Jones Elementary School
- Mary Lin Elementary School
- Miles Elementary School
- Morningside Elementary School
- Oglethorpe Elementary School
- Parkside Elementary School
- Perkerson Elementary School
- Peyton Forest Elementary School
- Pine Ridge Elementary School
- Rivers Elementary School
- Sarah Smith Elementary School
- Scott Elementary School
- Slater Elementary School
- Springdale Park Elementary School
- Sycamore Elementary school
- Kipp Vision Primary and Middle School
- Towns Elementary School
- Bazoline E. Usher Collier Heights Elementary School
- Venetian Hills Elementary School
- West Manor Elementary School
- Whitefoord Early Learning Academy
- Woodson Primary Elementary School

Tag Academy

=== Non-traditional schools ===
- Alonzo A. Crim Open Campus High School
- APS/Community Education Partnership (CEP) School
- The New School of Atlanta
- West End Academy
- Hank Aaron New Beginnings Academy - It was Forrest Hill Academy, named after Nathan Bedford Forrest, until 2021.

=== Single-gender academies ===
- The B.E.S.T. Academy at Benjamin S. Carson (Business, Engineering, Science, and Technology)
- The Coretta Scott King Young Women's Leadership Academy

=== Evening school programs ===
- Adult Literacy Program

=== Charter schools ===
- Atlanta Classical Academy
- Atlanta Neighborhood Charter School
- Centennial Academy
- Charles R. Drew Charter School
- The Kindezi School
- KIPP Atlanta Schools
- The Latin Academy
- University Community Academy, an Atlanta Charter School, Inc.
- Wesley International Academy
- Westside Atlanta Charter School

== Former schools ==
=== High schools ===
- Boys High School, 1872-1947
- Charles Lincoln Harper High School, 1963-1995
- Commercial High School, 1888-1947
- Daniel O'Keefe High School, 1947-1973
- David T. Howard High School, 1945-1976
- East Atlanta High School, 1959-1988
- Franklin D. Roosevelt High School, 1947-1985
- Fulton High School, 1915-1994
- Girls High School, 1872-1947
- Harper-Archer High School, 1995-2002
- Henry McNeal Turner High School, 1951-1990
- Hoke Smith High School, 1947-1985
- Joseph Emerson Brown High School, 1947-1992
- Luther Judson Price High School, 1954-1987
- North Fulton High School, 1920-1991
- Northside High School, 1950-1991
- Samuel Howard Archer High School, 1950-1995
- Southwest High School, 1950-1981
- Sylvan Hills High School, 1949-1987
- Tech High Charter School, 2004-2012
- Technological "Tech" High School, 1909-1947
- Walter F. George High School, 1959-1995
- West Fulton High School, 1947-1992
- William A. Bass High School, 1948-1987
- William F. Dykes High School, 1959-1973
- J.C. Murphy High School, 1949-1988

=== Middle schools ===
- Austin T. Walden Middle School
- Central Junior High School
- Daniel O'keefe Middle School, 1973-1983
- Henry McNeal Turner Middle School, 1989-2010
- John Fitzgerald Kennedy Middle School 1973-2004
- Marshall Middle School
- Sammye E. Coan Middle School
- Southwest Middle School
- Walter Leonard Parks Middle School
- West Fulton Middle School, 1992-2004
- CW Long Middle School

=== Elementary schools ===
- Adair Park Elementary School
- Anderson Park Elementary School, 1939-1973 (Fulton county until 1952)
- Anne E. West Elementary School
- Arkwright Elementary School
- Bell Street School, 1900-
- Ben Hill Elementary School
- Blair Village Elementary School
- Blalock Elementary School
- Burgess Elementary School
- C.D. Hubert Elementary School, renamed Atlanta Tech High in 2004
- Calhoun Street, 1883-
- Capitol View Elementary School 1940-1973
- Caroline F. Harper Elementary School
- Center Hill Elementary School
- Chattahoochee Elementary School 1936-1973 (Fulton County until 1952)
- Clark Howell Elementary School
- Collier Heights Elementary School 1940-1973
- Cook Elementary School
- Crew Street Elementary School, 1872- (burned 1885, rebuilt)
- Dean Rusk Elementary
- D.F. McClatchey Elementary School
- Davis Street, 1887
- Decatur Street Elementary School, 1872-1876?
- East Lake Elementary School 1947-1973
- Edgewood Avenue, 1892-1931
- Edmond Asa Ware Elementary School
- Edwin P. Johnson Elementary School
- Emma Clarissa Clement Elementary School 1947-1973
- English Avenue Elementary School 1947-1973
- Evan P. Howell Elementary School 1935-1982.(K-5 only 73-82)(Fulton County until 1952)
- Fair Street School, 1880-1920
- Formwalt School, 1893-?
- Fountain Elementary School 1948-1973
- Fourth Ward School (on Boulevard), 1902-
- Fowler St. Elementary School 1939-1973
- Fraser Street, 1891-?
- Gray Street, 1888-?
- Grant Park School, 1904-1937, Rebuilt 1939-1973
- H. R. Butler Elementary School (Young Street School)* Haynes Street School, 1873-?
- Harwell Elementary School 1954-1973
- Herndon Elementary School 1947-1973
- Home Park Elementary School 1935-1973
- Houston Street School, 1880-1925
- I.N. Ragsdale Elementary School
- Ira Street, 1885-1925
- Ivy Street Elementary School, 1872-1914
- Joel Chandler Harris Elementary School 1940-1973
- John B. Gordon Elementary school
- John Carey Elementary School1947-1973
- John F. Faith Elementary, renamed C.D. Hubert in 1963-1973
- John P. Whittaker Elementary School 1954-1973(Special Needs/Disabled Students 1968-1975)
- Jonathan M. Goldsmith Elementary School 1935-1973(Fulton County until 1952)
- Lakewood Elementary School 1940-19780 (K-5 73-80)
- Laura Haygood Elementary School 1947-1973
- Lee Street Elementary School (Previously West End School, renamed 1904), annexed APS 1894-closed 1939
- Luckie Street Elementary School, 1872-Demolished 1929 Rebuilt 1931-1973
- Marietta Street Elementary School, 1873-1935
- Margaret Mitchel Elementary School 1958-2009 (K-5 73-09)
- Minnie S. Howell Elementary School 1920-1954
- Mitchell Street, 1882-1914
- Moreland Ave. Elementary School 1940-1973
- Mount Vernon Elementary School 1924-1946 Burned Rebuilt 1950-1973(Fulton County until 1952)
- North Ave. Elementary School, 1908-1949
- Oglethorpe Elementary School 1947-1973
- Peeples Street Grammar School 18-?
- Pryor Street School, 1907-1949
- Riverside Elementary School1935-1973(Fulton County until 1952)
- Roach Street, 1892=?
- Rockdale Elementary School 1940-1973(Fulton County until 1952)
- Rosalie Wright Elementary School
- Smiley Elementary School operational in the 1950s (North Ave NE, near Parkway Dr NE)
- Spring Street Elementary School 1940-1973
- State Street, 1891-?
- Storr's School, opened 1866, added to APS 1872
- Summer Hill School, opened 1866, added to APS 1872
- Sylvan Hills Elementary School 1949-1973
- Tenth Street School, 1905-1939
- Thomas Jefferson Guice Elementary School 1954-1973
- Walker Street Elementary School, 1872-1935
- Waters Elementary School
- West End School (on Peeples St.), 1904-?
- William Franklin Hartnett (Hardnett) Elementary School, 1955-1985 (burned)
- William Franklin Slaton School (originally Grant Street school), 1908-1939 Rebuilt 1941-1996
- Williams Street, 1893-?
- White Elementary School 1949-1973

== See also ==
- Truancy Intervention Project, Inc.
