= Atlanta International School =

Private high school in Atlanta, Georgia, United States

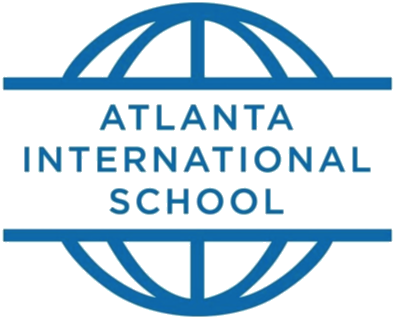

Location
- 2890 North Fulton Drive; Atlanta, Georgia 30345; United States; 33°50′00″N 84°22′43″W

Information
- Type: Private
- Motto: "To develop courageous leaders who shape their world for the better."
- Established: 1984
- Head of school: Kevin Glass
- Faculty: 211
- Teaching staff: 220.1 (FTE) (2019–20)
- Grades: 3K–12
- Enrollment: 1,198 (2019–20)
- Student to teacher ratio: 5.4 (2019–20)
- Colors: Blue and white
- Mascot: Eagles
- Affiliation: International Baccalaureate
- Website: aischool.org

Atlanta International School (AIS) is a private elementary, middle and high school in Atlanta, Georgia, United States. An International Baccalaureate school, it was opened in 1985.

AIS is accredited by the Council of International Schools, AdvancED and the Southern Association of Independent Schools and authorized by International Baccalaureate to offer IB programs.

== History ==
The school opened in September 1985 in a schoolhouse rented from Sardis United Methodist Church in Buckhead with 51 students in pre-kindergarten, kindergarten and first grade. In July 1987, AIS moved into facilities located on Long Island Drive, acquired from the Fulton County Board of Education. By September of that year, the roll had grown to 193 students in kindergarten through eighth grade. Grades 9, 10, 11 and 12 were added later, with the first graduates receiving their diplomas in June 1992. The enrollment exceeded 900 students in 2008.

Under a long-term agreement with the Atlanta Board of Education, valid through the year 2045, AIS moved its campus to its current location in 1995, the site of the former North Fulton High School. The building was designed by an Atlanta architect Philip Shutze, who is buried on the campus; a plaque near a tree adjacent to the blacktop marks the site. The campus includes science laboratories, a large library with computer facilities, an auditorium, the Lademacher Performing Arts Center, fine arts areas and an athletic complex including a gymnasium and a new soccer field and eight-lane track. In 2001, AIS secured a 50-year lease of the North Fulton Drive campus and purchased contiguous acreage.

The Adair Art, Science and Design Center opened at the start of the 2009–10 school year. It was dedicated on October 14, 2010, by Anne Cox Chambers in honor of Vee and Dick Adair. In 2012, AIS opened an Early Learning Center for 3K and 4K students, who participate in a full-immersion preschool program in Chinese, French, German, and Spanish.

It was a filming location for The Blind Side, Love, Simon, and Middle School: The Worst Years of My Life.

== Notable alumni ==
- Noah Cobb - 2024, professional soccer player
- Chris Lowell – 2003, actor
- Sophie Hawley-Weld – platinum selling record artist, composer, musician and singer of the group Sofi Tukker.
- Yolanda R. King – 2026, Activist and author, grandchild of Martin Luther King Jr.

== Events ==
The Atlanta International School has events, summer camps, and guest speakers. Events that have taken place at the school include:

- World Fest, October, annually
- My Freedom Day, March, Annually - in partnership with the CCASC.
- German Christmas Market, December, Annually
- United Nations (UN) Day
- French Kermesse

== Notes ==
As of 11:11, 8 October 2014 (UTC), this article is derived in whole or in part from Atlanta International School. The copyright holder has licensed the content in a manner that permits reuse under CC BY-SA 3.0 and GFDL. All relevant terms must be followed. The original text was at "official site"
