= Macedonia Park =

Macedonia Park Bagley Park
- Suburban neighborhood
- Interactive map of Macedonia Park
- Coordinates: 33°50′12.9″N 84°22′26″W

Macedonia Park, also known as Bagley Park, was a development in what is now the Buckhead Community of Atlanta, Georgia, United States. It was located on the present site of Frankie Allen Park in the Garden Hills neighborhood. It was situated in District 17, Land Lot 60. While many African-Americans lived in the area from 1870 to 1920, streets and addresses were not assigned until the area was developed by John Sheffield Owens, a white developer, in 1921. Despite the area's development, the homes were systemically bought up by Fulton County in the 1940s-50s. The county cited water quality issues and ordered a clean-up of the area, which ultimately led to the razing of the neighborhood.

== History ==
=== Development and growth ===
In the late 1800s Macedonia Park was a black community of about 400 families. In 1921, John Sheffield Owens, a white banker and developer, built a subdivision designated for African-Americans, presumably with the help of a local named William Bagley who lived in the area before and after the development. The houses were modest along the 27-acre tract, lots were narrow, and some backed up to a creek. Many of the families that had been living along the adjacent Old Decatur road in the 1920 census relocated to Macedonia Park along Bagley road.

From 1920 to 1940 the area continued to be home to a large number of African-Americans, many of whom worked locally as domestic help in the form of maids, laundresses, chauffeurs, and yardmen. There were also a number of gardeners for the local golf clubs, caddies, brick masons, pin boys who worked at the local bowling alley, in-home nurses, shoe shiners, truck drivers for the ice company, garbage collectors, fertilizer plant staff, and cotton mill workers.

=== Prominent community members ===
While many in the area did rent or board in the homes, there were also a number of homeowners who were long-time residents of the area, such as William and Ida Bagley. William bought six lots in Macedonia Park and was listed in the 1930s census as a 'Builder of Homes', while Ida was listed as 'Manager, Lunch room."

Other locals of note include Daniel and Mamie German, owners of a local grocery store; John and Annie Usher, owners of a local café; and William "Buddy" Bonner, the local blacksmith, who lived and worked adjacent to Macedonia Park on Pharr Rd.

=== Shops ===
The area was home to a vibrant collection of shops including two local grocery shops, owned by Mamie German (72 Bagley) and William Bagley (21 Bagley); two restaurants serving pot roasts, likely owned by John and Annie Usher (32 Bagley) and Flora Kimbraugh (20 Old Decatur); and a blacksmith shop at 463 Pharr Road owned by William "Buddy" Bonner. There were also several shops that seem to have been temporary, including Bee's Beauty Parlor at 27a Bagley. Many of the residents also worked at local drugstores, bowling alleys, hotels, private homes, and industrial companies.

=== Churches ===
The Mount Olive Methodist-Episcopal Church was founded at the corner of Pharr and Bagley in the early 1900s. Only 27 of the approximately 45 residents interred at the Mount Olive cemetery have been identified via newspaper and death certificate research. The church cemetery remains to this day. Other churches in the area were the Macedonia Baptist Church and the White Lily Baptist Church.

=== Destruction ===
Beginning in July 1940, the Fulton County Health Board began a health survey of the area, citing that a nearby spring had been condemned and that they were concerned about water quality. That August, the board ordered a clean up of the area and called for implementation of septic systems and improved water facilities. These improvements were not to be made via county funds to improve the infrastructure, but instead made by the homeowners. The concern was largely that the homes had no connection to sewer lines and so waste from the homes was making its way into the nearby stream, and flowing south near the North Fulton Grammar School.

In August 1944, $50,000 was set aside by the county to buy out and condemn the area to make way for a park. In September the county legal department was instructed to "negotiate with the property owners and make all arrangements necessary" for the park to be established where the homes were. The commission committee went one step further and at the September 7 meeting, they entered a resolution stating, "The Legal Department of Fulton County... is hereby authorized and directed to negotiate with the owners of property in the affected area and to purchase same by contract with said owners and obtain deeds and conveyances from said owners, when the owners of said property are willing to sell for sums deemed by the Legal Department and this County Commission to be reasonable and just; ...BE IT FURTHER RESOLVED that the Legal Department... is hereby authorized and directed to acquire by condemnation all land in said subdivisions and in the affected area when same cannot be acquired by contract after negotiation with the property owners."

Although Fulton County began buying up lots in earnest, at the rate of $450 to $1000 per lot, it often ended up renting the houses back to the previous owners with the stipulation that the county could end the lease with 30 days' notice. The North Fulton Civic Club's president, Bonnie Smith, urged at the inaugural meeting of the club in January 1948 for the area to be cleared, in lieu of the houses being rented out, citing it was "an eyesore to the North side". The group passed a resolution for the area to be turned over for the development of a park and playground, and for the general "benefit of [white] children in the North Fulton area." Despite a grand jury presentment in May 1948 citing that the area was "not a suitable location for a park and unnecessary, due to the proximity of other well-developed parks," the county continued to push forward with plans. Future publications about this area allude to the fact that the county was looking to push African-Americans out of an increasingly white area that had become attractive to white families that were "booming" after World War II, was building "pretty homes", and did not want the "ugly slum" "[e]ncroaching on the properties that hard-working citizens have sweated blood to pay for."

In June 1948 the county announced that it would "find" an additional $25,000 to pay for the remaining homes in the area. The Garden Hills Civic Club pushed for the development of a park, citing the need to "provide a badly needed recreational area for the young people in the section," and to "eliminate a breeding place of crime and a cesspool of filth." The county moved forward with their plans, and in October evicted nine families, with the intent to evict another 20 families, all of whom had been renting back their previously owned homes. Despite the eviction of 29 families, the county had not yet bought 16 of the properties from their owners, and said in October 1948 that the funds to do so had been exhausted. In November 1948, the Fulton County Commission approved an additional $50,000 to be raised to purchase the 16 properties "before the end of the year." and Commissioner Jim Aldredge praised Chairman R L Doyal for his "continuous efforts to develop the area and deplored criticism directed at the Chairman by a Buckhead newspaper."

1949 saw additional opposition to this plan, as a commission was raised to study the "Negro Housing Plan". This was due in large part to 127 war veterans asking for the right to buy property to develop neighborhoods for African-Americans due to the increase in overall population, and an increase in eviction of homes for the development of warehouses, parks, and expressways. An editorial by Ralph McGill ran earlier in 1949 and supported the further development of additional and new neighborhoods for African-Americans, provided they were segregated from white neighborhoods. Additional publications stated that $100,000 had been given for the buying of the land of Bagley Park, and reinforced the negative stereotypes of the area being a "pool of juvenile crime" while implying the benefit of parks to local white children. Atlanta Mayor William Hartsfield, when debating against Charlie Brown in August 1949 and seeking reelection, bashed Brown for using $200,000 to buy up Bagley Park and forcing the residents out, yet no work had been done on the park. The park was quickly set up for planning and development, with plans for it passing in November 1949. Despite this, the houses still stood until 1951, when the last three homes were relocated to be used as a youth center.

=== Redevelopment ===
Bagley Park, a white only community ball ground and recreational area, was established on the land in 1952, coinciding with the annexation of the area by the City of Atlanta, and was renamed Frankie Allen Park in 1980. Mt. Olive AME Church at the corner of Bagley and Pharr was sold to the Garden Hills Woman Club (later Northside Women's Club) in 1952, further removing the African-American community from Macedonia Park.

A final affront to the legacy of Macedonia Park came in 2009, when its only physical remnant, the small Mt. Olive church cemetery on the edge of the park, was sold by the county on the courthouse steps for back taxes. Although the county acknowledged its mistake as cemeteries are exempt from property taxes, the sale was final. When a developer applied for a permit to remove the graves, the Buckhead Heritage Society's Wright Mitchell, who practices business litigation, filed a lawsuit pro bono on behalf of Elon Butts Osby, a Bagley descendant whose parents had moved to the city's largely undeveloped northwestern fringe after leaving Macedonia Park.

The permit was denied, and Buckhead Heritage adopted the cemetery informally, since the land is still privately owned. In 2015, the group repaired the work of vandals who had toppled several of the headstones.
