= Garden Hills Elementary School =

- U.S. Historic district – Contributing property

- Location within Georgia Location within the United States
- Location: 285 Sheridan Dr NE, Atlanta, Georgia
- Coordinates: 33.8316°N 84.3783°W
- Built: 1938
- Architect: Tucker and Howell
- Website: atlantapublicschools.us/gardenhills
- Part of: Garden Hills Historic District (ID87001362)
- Designated CP: August 17, 1987

Garden Hills Elementary School is an elementary school in Garden Hills, Atlanta, Georgia and a part of Atlanta Public Schools (APS).

Built in 1938, the brick school building is a work of Atlanta architect Philip Shutze. It was built by as a part of the Works Progress Administration (WPA) and was made to blend in with surrounding architectural styles. Robert M. Craig, author of Atlanta Architecture: Art Deco to Modern Classic, 1929-1959, described the school as "[representing] a traditional work by" designer Tucker and Howell. The building most recently underwent a renovation/addition in 2001, when a cafeteria and a section of classrooms were added.

It enrolls children in kindergarten through fifth grade. The principal is Stacy, Perot

It is a contributing property in the Garden Hills Historic District on the National Register of Historic Places.

Garden Hills was the first elementary school in Georgia to become an International Baccalaureate World School.

== Extracurricular programs ==
In 1997 the Atlanta Journal-Constitution wrote that the school's orchestra, which had 75 students, some of whom did not natively speak English, "won acclaim", and Anne Sheldon, the teacher overseeing the program, stated that the school's faculty has "absolute commitment to the program" and that the students were "very, very dedicated."

== Student body and attendance zone ==
In 1987 the school had about 400 students, with about 73 coming from the 287-unit Piedmont Court and East Wesley Apartments, known for hosting various waves of refugees, including from the Cuban Revolution, the Vietnam War, and the Soviet–Afghan War. Nehl Horton of the Atlanta Journal-Constitution wrote that Garden Hills accordingly "has a well-developed and successful program for international students." A spokesperson for the apartment residents stated that "The international component[...]has brought Atlanta recognition around the country from teachers of English as a second language." In 1987 the Atlanta Zoning Board decided to approve an application to have the property rezoned for higher density use, which would mean demolition.

In 2003 about 50% of the students were Hispanic or Latino. At that time it had a number of students who were born outside of the United States.

== Feeder patterns ==
Residents zoned to Garden Hills are also zoned to: Sutton Middle School and North Atlanta High School.
