= Caribbean Committee Against Sex Crimes =

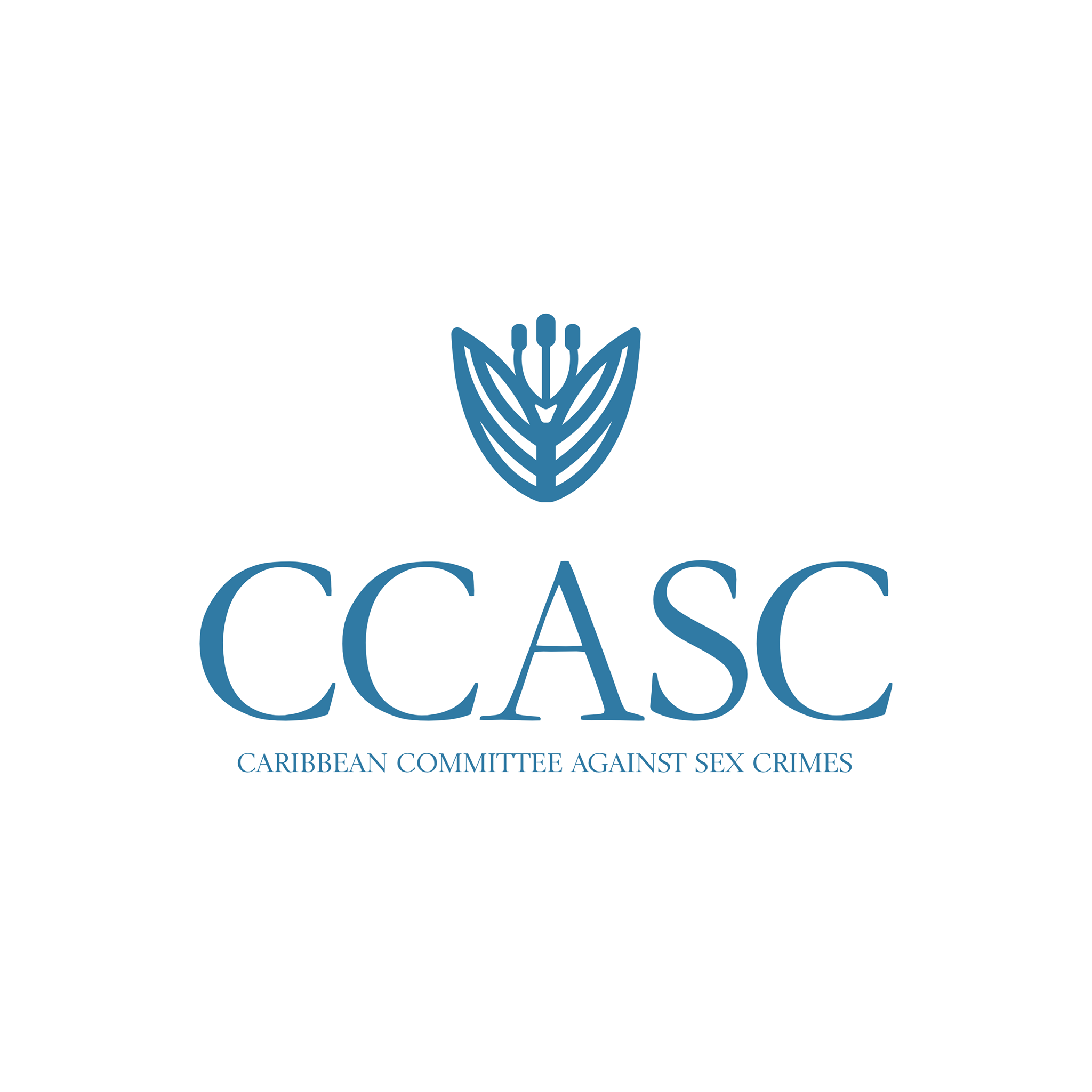
- Abbreviation: CCASC
- Formation: 2014
- Founder: Camille St. Omer

The Caribbean Committee Against Sex Crimes (CCASC) was founded in 2014 by Camille St. Omer of the Zandoli International Foundation. An online meeting was held in March 2015 to call for a regional sex offender registry in order to reduce the high rate of sex crime that is endemic in the Caribbean region.

This meeting was attended by over 35 NGOs from across the Caribbean including Jamaica Men Against Rape, Leave Out Violence in Saint Vincent, the Organization for Abused and Battered Individuals from Trinidad and Tobago and several other non-profits who work in the fields of gender based violence, human trafficking and women's rights. There was a consensus that sex offender registration was needed and the committee was born.

The idea for a regional sex offenders registry was inspired by the US International Megan's Law to end child sex trafficking (HR515) which specifically provides for reciprocal notification of sex offender travel. The US Angel Watch Center emails information about travelling sex offenders to destination countries in order to deter child sex trafficking.

The work of the committee was designed to work in tandem with the US International Megan's Law and the Angel Watch Center. Zandoli International and the committee are one of the handful of non profits in the world working on expanding the reach of the US International Megan's Law to end Child Sex Trafficking.

== Team ==
Camille St. Omer was born in Saint Lucia but presently resides in the United States. She is a graduate researcher who focuses on autonomy and automation for artificial intelligence models.

In 2016 Attorney at Law Jonathan Bhagan was appointed as Chairman of the Caribbean Committee Against Sex Crimes in recognition of his passion and leadership ability. Fellow Attorney at Law Gina Maharaj was appointed as Vice Chair.

The Caribbean Committee against Sex Crimes also had a partnership with the Volunteer Center of Trinidad and Tobago to recruit volunteer researchers for its projects in 2017.

== Notable achievements ==
The Caribbean Committee against Sex Crimes was instrumental in campaigning for sex offender registration throughout the Caribbean in regional media. Trinidad and Tobago passed an amended sex offenders registry bill in September 2019 making it the smallest country in the world to have a public sex offender registration policy. This was as a direct result of lobbying and policy input from the committee and other non profits working in Trinidad and Tobago.

In 2017 the committee lectured the Association of Caribbean Commissioners of Police on the need for an integrated regional sex offenders registry. The team facilitated senior policy analyst Lori McPherson from the US Department of Justice SMART office to attend this meeting in order to give advice on the existing Angel Watch Center's functions. It was noted that police departments across the Caribbean were already getting emails from the Angel Watch center informing them of the movement of registered sex offenders into the Caribbean region.

On February 22, 2018, the committee met with CARICOM IMPACs the regional security implementation agency. Upon request a policy paper on the topic of reducing sex crime in the Caribbean region was sent to CARICOM IMPACS and its partners based on research and input from the Caribbean Committee Against Sex Crimes.

On 18 November 2016, the committee held an online meeting with US Justice Department Policy analyst Lori Mcpherson to discuss the prospect of regional sex offender registration and the drafting of a treaty to bring about a unified CARICOM sex offender's registry. A final draft of this treaty to bring about regional sex offender registration was produced in early 2017. This document was used to guide policy decisions in relation to Trinidad and Tobago's sex offender registry bill.

On September 15, 2020 "Operation Global Sex Offenders Registry" was announced which is a partnership between US based software company OffenderWatch and the Caribbean Committee against Sex Crimes.

In 2022 the Committee partnered with the Franciscan Institute to work on the CNN #MyfreedomDay event. NGOs around the Caribbean were contacted to take the #MyFreedomDay pledge. The Franciscan Institute used its network in several Caribbean islands to get students in high schools to do spoken word poems and informative videos raising awareness about Human Trafficking. A video compilation of the work of these high school students was aired on CNN International

== Impact ==
The committee continues to assist NGOs and Activists across the Caribbean region in the fight against sex crimes, human trafficking and violence against women and girls. CCASC has recently made contact with president of BPW Dominica, Rhoda St. John and provided support and advice for their campaign for sex offender registration in Dominica.

Antigua and several other territories are in the process of implementing their sex offenders registry thanks in part to the activism of the committee.
