= The B.E.S.T. Academy =

B.E.S.T. Academy

Location
- Atlanta, Georgia; United States; 33°46′28.61″N 84°26′52.56″W

Information
- Type: Public, single-gender (boys)
- School district: Atlanta Public Schools - SRT 4
- Principal: Timothy D. Jones
- Teaching staff: 32.60 (FTE)
- Grades: 6 through 12
- Enrollment: 237 (2022-23)
- Student to teacher ratio: 7.27
- Colors: Blue and gold
- Mascot: Eagles
- Website: B.E.S.T. Academy

The B.E.S.T. Academy is a STEM certified all-boys school serving grade 6-12 students in Carey Park, Atlanta, Georgia. The school was opened in 2007, and for a short time was referred to as the boys single gender academy, but was later named by its first principal, Curt R. Green, in honor of neurosurgeon Ben Carson. B.E.S.T. is an acronym for Business, Engineering, Science, and Technology.

== Single-gender education ==
The B.E.S.T. academy was initiated by Atlanta Public Schools based on the research of Michael Gurian, who asserts that girls and boys have different learning styles. To this effect, teachers at B.E.S.T. employ teaching strategies that are geared toward the general learning styles of boys.

== Curriculum ==
The students at B.E.S.T. undergo an academic curriculum which includes language arts, social studies, reading, math, and science.

=== Connections ===
Students at B.E.S.T have an opportunity to take various connections classes. These include:

- Art
- Band
- Business Education and Computer Technology
- Chorus
- Heath & Physical Education
- Sex Ed
- Spanish
- Strings

=== Extracurricular activities ===
The following extracurricular activities are offered at B.E.S.T.:

- Afterschool Allstars
- Baseball
- Basketball
- Cross Country
- Debate team
- Football
- JROTC
- Robotics
- Swimming
- Track and field
- Fencing
