= Girls High School (Atlanta) =

Coordinates: 33.738744°N 84.363437°W

Girls' High School
- 745 Rosalia Street SE; Atlanta, Georgia; United States

Information
- Type: Public
- Established: 1872
- School district: 14th
- Faculty: 39 teachers
- Grades: 9-12
- Campus size: 104 rooms
- Campus type: Urban
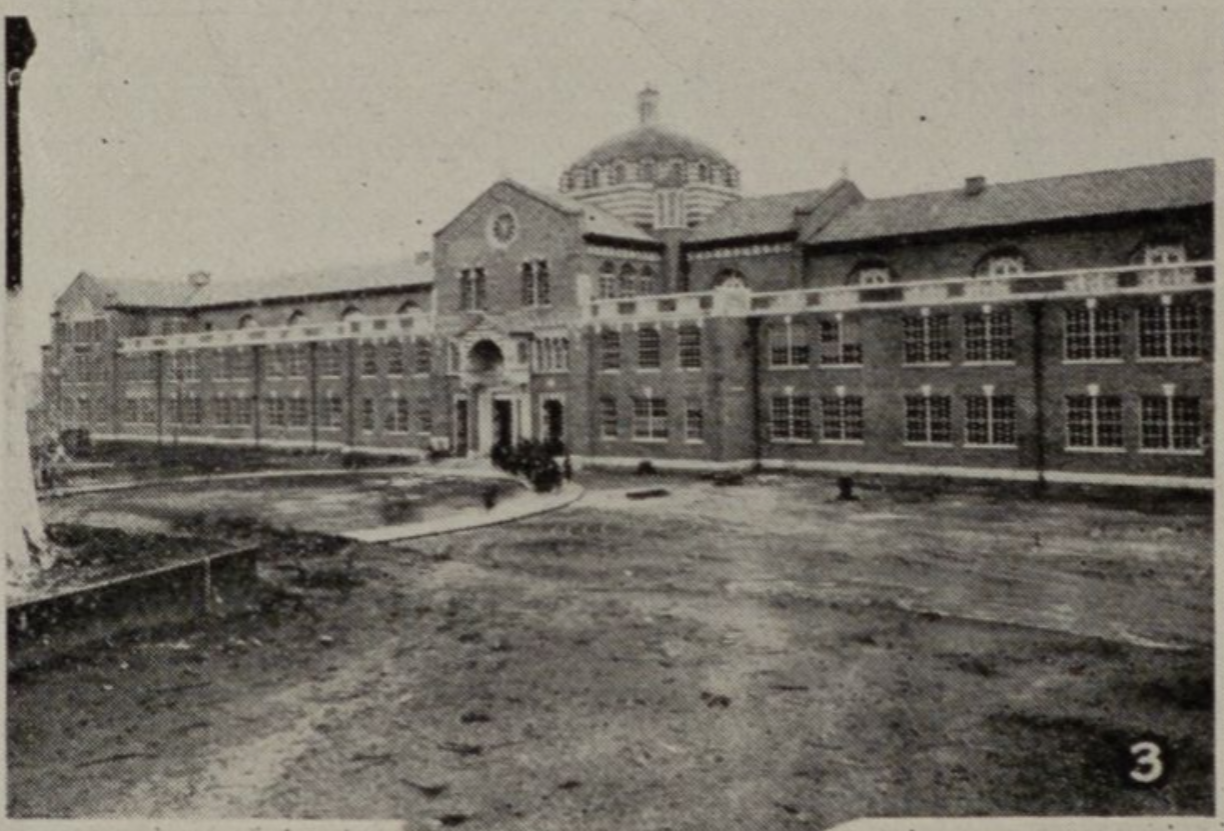

Girls' High School was one of seven schools opened in 1872 as part of the original public school system in Atlanta, Georgia, US.

Girls' High began in the John Neal/William Lyon Mansion, used by General William T. Sherman as his headquarters during his occupation of Atlanta. The site of the mansion at Mitchell and Washington Streets is now occupied by City Hall.

A superb school academically, Girls' High was the only public high school in Atlanta exclusively for girls. Seventy-one girls received diplomas from the school at the graduation exercises in May 1911. In 1919, two graduates received scholarships for Barnard College.

In 1925, Girls' High School moved into one of 18 new buildings in the 14th district, paid for by a massive bond issue. The school boasted the following amenities:

- 104 rooms, including science halls, laboratories, a business department, sewing rooms, a library, an art department, music room, and outdoor classrooms on the third level
- A model apartment containing a living/dining room, bedroom, bath and kitchenette
- 20 classrooms and individual offices for 39 teachers
- A school bank cage, part of the business department, which encouraged the girls to save and simultaneously gave them an opportunity to learn the banking business

In 1947, Atlanta high schools became co-educational and Girl's High was renamed Roosevelt High School for US President Franklin Delano Roosevelt. The school continued until 1985, when it combined with Hoke Smith Technical School. A new school building, Maynard Jackson High, was built on Glenwood Avenue just below the old Girl's High, where it still stands today. Since then, the original building has been converted into an apartment complex.

== Notable alumni ==
- Corinne Stocker Horton (1871–1947), elocutionist, journalist, newspaper editor, and clubwoman
