= Families First =

American health care center

Families First is an American community health center and family resource center serving the Seacoast region of New Hampshire and southern Maine, based in Portsmouth, New Hampshire. Also known as Families First Health & Support Center, it is an independent non-profit charitable organization. It provides services regardless of ability to pay, including primary, prenatal, behavioral and oral health care; parenting classes, playgroups and home visiting; and mobile health and dental services.

Families First was founded in 1984 as the Portsmouth Prenatal Clinic and went on to add many other services.

In 2016, Families First served about 6,500 people.
