= North Atlanta High School =

Public high school in Atlanta, Georgia, United States

Location
- 4111 Northside Parkway; Atlanta, Georgia; United States; 33°51′57″N 84°26′48″W

Information
- Type: Public secondary
- Motto: "Diversity, Scholarship, Community"
- Established: 1991; 35 years ago
- School district: Atlanta Public Schools
- CEEB code: 110205
- NCES School ID: 130012002212
- Principal: Angela Mitchell
- Teaching staff: 151.10 (FTE)
- Employees: 219.9
- Grades: 9–12
- Enrollment: 2,332 (2023-2024)
- Student to teacher ratio: 15.43
- Colors: Silver and black
- Mascot: Warrior
- Publication: Warrior Wire
- Yearbook: Invictus
- Website: atlantapublicschools.us/northatlanta

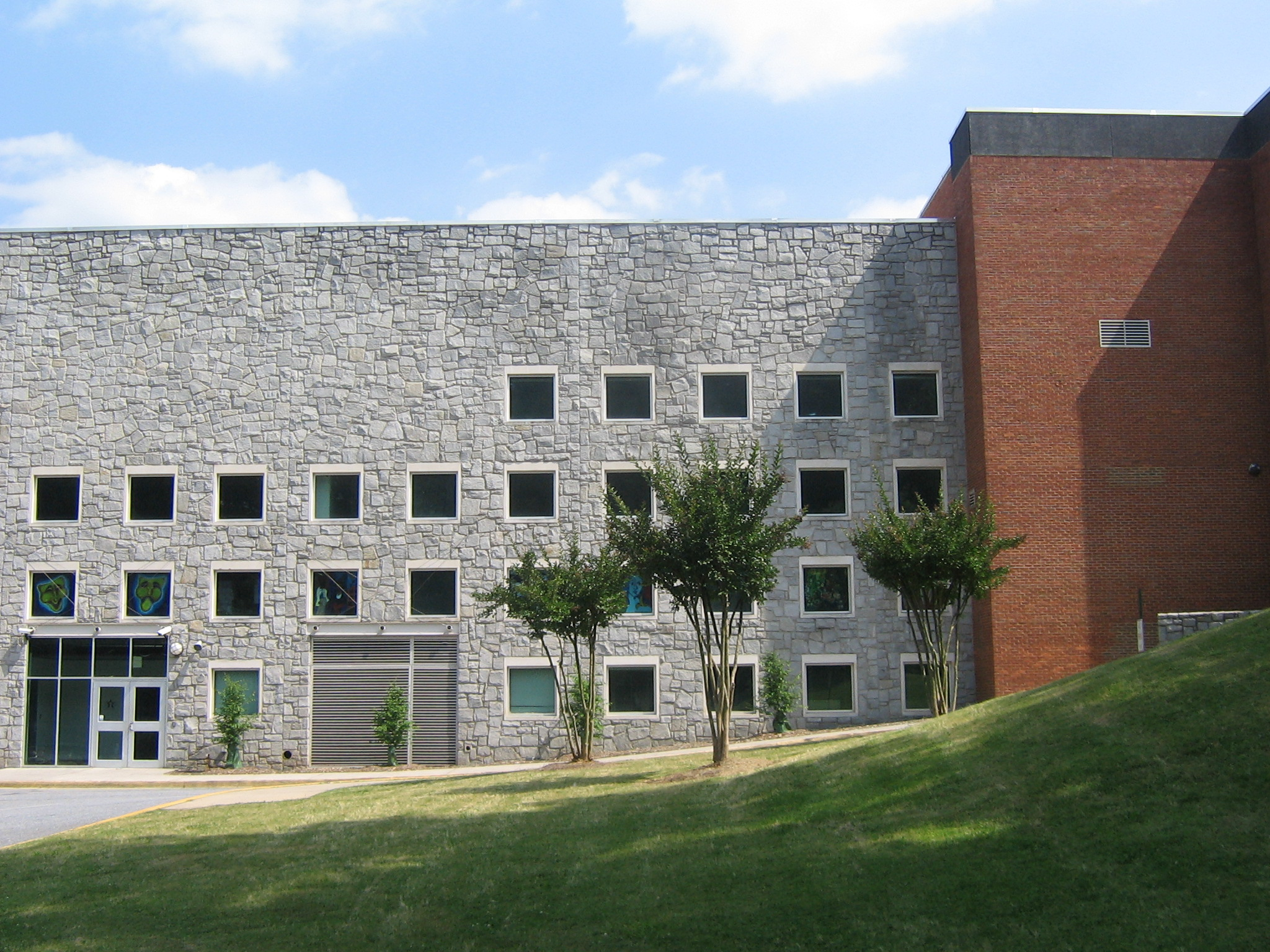
Former North Atlanta High School campus (now Sutton Middle School), facing south

North Atlanta High School is a comprehensive public high school of approximately 2300 students in the Paces neighborhood of the Buckhead community of Atlanta, Georgia, United States. The school is a part of Atlanta Public Schools (APS).

The school was formed after North Fulton High School combined with Northside High School during the 1991–1992 school year. This merger resulted in North Atlanta High School being the only high school in APS to host two magnet programs: the International Studies Program and the Performance Arts. The Performance Arts program is now technically defunded, but North Atlanta continues to encourage students' artistic abilities and talents in performance.

== History ==
=== Northside High School (1950–1991) ===
Fulton County School Board opened Northside High School in 1950 at the current location of the Sutton Middle School: 7th-8th Grade Campus building. Northside High School became part of the APS when the property was annexed into the city of Atlanta. The school colors were purple and white, and the school nickname was the Tigers. In 1969, APS opened a planetarium at the Northside campus. Originally, it was one of three planetariums owned by Atlanta Public Schools (the other two being at Fulton and Harper High). It can seat 110 people.

=== North Atlanta High School (1991–present) ===
In June 1990 the APS school board voted to merge Northside and North Fulton High, closing the North Side Campus and making the North Fulton campus host the new school. In January 1991 the school board chose the name North Atlanta High School.

In September 1991 the school opened. The students attended the North Fulton campus, until June 1994, while the former Northside High School underwent a $15 million renovation. In 1998, North Atlanta was designated as a Georgia School of Excellence by the Georgia Department of Education. After the 2001–2002 school year, West Fulton High School and Harper-Archer High School closed. Since there wasn't adequate capacity at Douglass High School, the closest school, the students in the Scott and Boyd Elementary school districts were rezoned to North Atlanta. This area encompassed both Hollywood Courts and the former Perry Homes. Starting in 2004, Newsweek rated North Atlanta as being one of the best high schools in the country for three consecutive years. In the spring of 2008, the Aga Khan visited and gave a speech at North Atlanta as a part of the annual IB conference.

As of the 2008–2009 school year, the incoming 9th grade class was zoned to Douglass High School. In 2008, North Atlanta began its partnership with the Juilliard School. Juilliard began its inaugural Summer Jazz program in June 2008, and planned to continue the camp in future years. In the summer of 2009, APS started its $40 million renovation on the building. Phase 1 included the expansion and modernization of the instructional classrooms, while Phase 2 included the grounds and rooms such as the theatre and the cafeteria.

Phase two of the SPLOST 3 renovation, in the summer of 2010, included renovations and modernization of all non-instructional facilities such as the media center and athletic areas.

The 2010–2011 school year saw the third wave of Atlanta Public Schools' High School Transformation Initiative. The new changes included extending the IB Diploma Programme to each SLC, eliminating the status of a magnet program from the International Studies SLC, and other initiatives aimed at increasing student achievement. A fourth SLC was tentative for the transformation.

In order to alleviate overcrowding at Sutton Middle School, around 2009 APS issued a proposal to create state-of-the-art facilities for NAHS elsewhere in Buckhead, and to use the then-current NAHS facilities on Northside Drive at Kingswood Lane as a new middle school. However, instead of creating a new middle school, it was decided that Sutton Middle School would be separated into two campuses. Its new 7th and 8th Grade Campus was established at this location (apparently by the 2013–2014 school year), and its 6th Grade Campus remains at the school's original location on Powers Ferry Road at Jett Road, 3.5 miles north of the Northside Drive campus.

== Campus ==
APS purchased a former IBM office building on Northside Parkway in the Paces neighborhood of Atlanta, along with its 56 acres (23 ha) wooded campus. The 11-story building, which previously housed 5,000 IBM employees in its 507,093 square feet (47,110.5 m^{2}), was converted to new facilities for NAHS students. The campus straddles a retention pond. The parking deck is used for parking, while the more distant parking lots have become a track and field. Another building, deemed unsuitable for the school, was imploded on October 27, 2012, to be rebuilt as a theater and gymnasium, among other purposes. The architecture was led by Cooper Carry and construction was performed by J.E. Dunn. The new school was ready for the 2013–2014 school year. The cost of the new campus altogether was $147 million; APS received some criticism for the cost, which made the school the most expensive public high school in the history of the state. The Atlanta Journal-Constitution described the school as "swanky".

== Student activities ==
The North Fulton Quiz Bowl team won the 1990 AA state title in the tournament sanctioned by the Georgia Academic Team Association, and Northside won the 1991 AAA title. In 1998, the North Atlanta Quiz Bowl team won the state championship before going on to finish with a No. 16 national ranking at the Tournament of Champions in Chicago, Illinois. The team also earned a berth in the 2000 Tournament of Champions.

=== Athletics ===
==== State championships ====
Northside

- Football: 1957 (AAA)
- Boys' track: 1956 (AA); 1979 (7AAAA) mile relay State Champions

North Fulton

- Girls' swimming: 1957, 1958, 1959
- Football: 1966 (AA)
- Boys' cross country: 1953–54, 1955, 1956, 1966 (Div. II), 1971 (AA), 1972 (AA), 1973 (AA), 1974 (AA), 1975 (AA), 1979 (AA)
- Boys' basketball: 1953 (AA)
- Boys' track: 1954 (AA tie w/ Griffin), 1967 (AA), 1974 (AA)

North Atlanta

- Girls' basketball: 2000 (AAA)
- Girls' cross country: 2021 (6A)
- Girls’ tennis: 2022 (6A)
- Boys’ cross country: 2022 (6A)
- Boys' track & field: 2023 200m relay (6A)

== Bus route ==
Bus 12 that runs through Cumberland Mall feeds through the former campus of North Atlanta High School (now Sutton Middle School). It also runs through the new campus, the IBM building in Fulton County.

== Feeder schools ==
- Elementary schools: Bolton Academy, Brandon Elementary, Garden Hills Elementary, Jackson Elementary, Smith Elementary, and E. Rivers Elementary
- Middle school: Sutton Middle

== Notable alumni ==
- Johntá Austin - singer, songwriter, producer
- David Cross (Northside High School) - actor best known for his role in Arrested Development and the sketch comedy show Mr. Show
- James Dickey (North Fulton High School) - author of Deliverance
- Isaiah Drake – MLB outfielder
- Cydney Gillon - Contestant on the 32nd season of Survivor and professional body builder
- Sam Graddy (Northside High School) - gold medal winner in the 4 × 100 m relay at the 1984 Summer Olympics; former NFL player for the Denver Broncos and the Los Angeles Raiders
- Jasmine Guy (Northside High School) - actress best known for her role as Whitley Gilbert in A Different World
- Matt Hullum - director, best known for Lazer Team and Red Vs Blue
- Erika Jayne (Northside High School) - The Real Housewives of Beverly Hills; singer; actress
- Billy Milner (Northside High School) - 1995 NFL first round draft pick of the Miami Dolphins
- Ed Nutting (Northside High School) - former NFL player for the Dallas Cowboys
- E. Earl Patton (North Fulton High School) - Atlanta businessman and politician
- Travis Payne (Northside High School) - choreographer
- Christiani Pitts - actress, singer, dancer
- RuPaul (Northside High School) - drag queen, musician, and actor, full name RuPaul Andre Charles
- Bobby V - R&B singer; also known as Bobby Valentino
- Stephen Weatherly - professional football player - DE for the Cleveland Browns
- Curtis Williams - rapper, co-founder of Two-9
- Van Earl Wright (North Fulton High School) - American Sportscaster
- Sam Wyche - (North Fulton High School) - football player, coach
