= Norris B. Herndon =

American executive (1897–1977)

- Born: July 15, 1897; Atlanta, Georgia, U.S.
- Died: June 7, 1977 (aged 79); Atlanta, Georgia, U.S.
- Education: Atlanta University (BS); Harvard University (MBA)
- Occupations: Business Executive; Philanthropist
- Title: Chairman & President of Atlanta Life Insurance Company (1927–1973)
- Website: theherndonfoundation.org/biography/norris-bumstead-herndon/

Norris Bumstead Herndon (July 15, 1897 – June 7, 1977) was a prominent African-American businessman, Harvard Business School MBA graduate, philanthropist, member of Alpha Phi Alpha fraternity, and second President of the historic African-American-owned Atlanta Life Insurance Company.

Herndon was the only child of Atlanta, Georgia's first African-American millionaire businessman Alonzo F. Herndon who rose out of chattel enslavement and sharecropping in rural Georgia and founded Atlanta Life in 1905.

The Atlanta Life Insurance Company, founded in the era of violent white racial animosity and vitriolic Jim Crow segregation, cemented its operational success through a commitment to sustained financial solvency and promptness in paying claims. Atlanta Life Insurance survived the Atlanta massacre of 1906, the ravageous Spanish flu epidemic of 1918–1919, the devastating Tulsa race massacre of 1921, the Great Depression of 1929, and post-1950s desegregation and integration which lead to the decline of many African-American businesses.

Under Norris Herndon, the Atlanta Life Insurance Company grew from $1 million at the time of his father's death in 1927, to $84 million in assets at the time of Herndon's retirement in 1973. Operating today as the Atlanta Life Financial Group, it is currently valued at around $250 million.

== Early life and family ==
Herndon was born on July 15, 1897, in Atlanta, Georgia. He was the son and only child of millionaire African-American businessman Alonzo Franklin Herndon (June 26, 1858 – July 21, 1927) and Adrienne McNeil Herndon (July 22, 1869 – April 6, 1910) (born Elizabeth A. Stephens), a well-known actress and professor of dramatics and elocution at Atlanta University.

Herndon and his family, light-complexioned African-Americans, could each "pass" for Caucasian, easily blending into Atlanta's white community.

When Herndon was 13, his father built an illustrious Beaux Arts Classical home with 15 rooms in the Vine City neighborhood on Diamond Hill, the highest natural elevation in the city of Atlanta near Morris Brown College. The mansion, known today as the Herndon Home, was declared a U.S. National Historic Landmark in 2000.

Four months after Herndon and his family moved into their new home, his mother Adrienne died unexpectedly in 1910 from Addison's disease. Herndon took his mother's passing very hard.

Herndon's father Alonzo eventually married again, wedding Jessie Gillespie Herndon (September 6, 1871 - February 1, 1947), a hairdresser and manicurist and daughter of Ezekiel Gillespie, a railroad messenger on the Milwaukee and St. Paul Railway Company, and Catherine Robinson Gillespie, both prominent members of Milwaukee's Black community. Lorenzo and Jessie met through mutual friends in the summer of 1911.

== Education ==
Well-educated, Herndon graduated high school at Atlanta University (now Clark Atlanta University) in 1915. He also attended college at Atlanta University, graduating in 1919. Growing up the polar opposite of his sharecropping roots father, Herndon was not accustomed to outdoor or sportsman activities. Accordingly, Alonzo insisted that Norris become physically active to improve his academic performance.

Herndon attended Harvard University, graduating in 1921 with a master's degree in Business Administration. Herndon was only one of two African-Americans in his Harvard MBA graduating class. The only other African-American classmate, Benjamin Tanner Johnson, became a tireless champion for African American owned banks where he helped found the African-American-owned New England People's Finance Company, worked as a Connecticut state supervisor in the Works Progress Administration (WPA), taught finance at Howard University, and served as Executive Secretary in the National Urban League of Canton, Ohio.

Years later, Morris Brown College awarded Herndon an honorary L.L.D. Degree.

== Niagara Movement and overseas travel ==
A family friend of the great scholar and civil rights leader, W.E.B. Du Bois, seven-year old Herndon accompanied his father and Du Bois to Niagara, New York, for the 1905 founding meeting of the Niagara Movement, the predecessor of the National Association for the Advancement of Colored People (NAACP). DuBois taught at Atlanta University with Herndon's mother, Adrienne.

On June 4, 1912, Herndon sailed on the RMS Carpathia on a three-month family vacation/honeymoon with his father Alonzo and Alonzo's new wife Jessie Gillespie Herndon of Milwaukee, Wisconsin, whom Alonzo met through mutual friends in the summer of 1911. Their vacation occurred less than two months after the RMS Carpathia had navigated the North Atlantic ice fields to rescue 705 survivors of the April 15, 1912 Titanic disaster.

By his mid-twenties, Herndon had become an extensive domestic and world traveler, with his father's blessing and planning trips overseas visiting numerous places including New York, Rome, Italy, and other parts of Europe.

== Career at the Historic Atlanta Life Insurance Company ==
After graduation from Harvard, Herndon joined the Atlanta Life Insurance Company. He first worked as a cashier, and then as Atlanta Life's First Vice President.

Herndon helped his father Alonzo navigate difficult times, including the devastating 1918 Spanish flu epidemic and the murderous Tulsa race massacre of 1921, both which burdened the company with death and sick claims.

When his father Alonzo Herndon died in 1927, Norris Herndon became Atlanta Life Insurance Company's second ever President at 28 years old. His stepmother, Jessie Gillespie Herndon joined him as Atlanta Life Insurance Corporation's vice president. In his will, Alonzo left split his fortune between Norris and Alonzo's widow and 2nd wife, Jessie Gillespie Herndon, with the provision that Jessie's half go to Norris at her death. Jessie joined Norris as an Atlanta Life Insurance Corporation's vice president.

After Jessie died at age 75 on February 1, 1947, from a stroke after visiting Tiffin, Ohio, Herndon, in 1952, created the Alonzo F. and Norris B. Herndon Foundation, a private foundation dedicated to advancing the Herndon legacy through education, mentoring, and preparing the next generation of entrepreneurs. The foundation also maintains Herndon's childhood home, known affectionally as "the Herndon Home." Transformed into a museum in 1973, the Herndon Home highlights Alonzo Herndon's passage from enslavement and eventual ascent as an astute African-American businessman and civic leader. The Foundation is led by a board of trustees which includes Adam Herndon, Alonzo Herndon's great-great nephew. The Herndon Home was declared a U.S. National Historic Landmark in 2000.

Under Herndon, the Atlanta Life Insurance Company grew from $1 million at the time of his father's passing in 1927, to $84 million in assets at the time of Herndon's retirement in 1973. Atlanta Life is currently valued around $250 million.

== Civil rights activism ==
Herndon played a significant behind-the-scenes role in the 1950s' Civil Rights Movement. He regularly funded the solvency of many civil rights efforts, including the NAACP, United Negro College Fund, Phyllis Wheatley YMCA, Atlanta University, Morris Brown College, First Congregational Church in Atlanta and the National Urban League.

In 1948, Herndon bequeathed land and fund to Atlanta University to construct Herndon Stadium, a sports facility located one block from Herndon's childhood home.

Under Herndon's leadership, the Atlanta Life Insurance Company held the first and only insurance policy on noted Civil Rights leader and icon Martin Luther King Jr.

== Membership in fraternities ==
Herndon was a member of Alpha Phi Alpha fraternity. He was initiated at the fraternity's Sigma chapter at Boston University on the chapter's 2nd initiate class in 1921.

Herndon's initiated in the same line as Charles Hamilton Houston. Herndon's father, Alonzo Herndon, was initiated into Alpha Phi Alpha fraternity as an Exalted Honorary Member at the organization's December 1924 17th General Convention in New York. At the time, an honorary membership was the highest form of membership conferred by the Fraternity. Lorenzo was listed as a member of Alpha Phi Alpha's Eta Lambda graduate chapter in Atlanta, Georgia. The Herndon's residence, the Herndon Home, became a site of many Alpha functions for the fraternity brothers in Atlanta.

Additionally, Norris Herndon was a member of District Grand Lodge 18 of the Atlanta Grand United Order of Odd Fellows in Atlanta.

== Interest in arts ==
Possibly influenced by his theatrical mother Adrienne's legacy, Norris Herndon seriously considered a professional career in theatre and the arts, attending every show his father would permit. When Norris initially resisted his father's insistence that he fully commit to inherit Atlanta Life, Alonzo wrote the following to Norris:

"You spoke of the shows, but that is not very interesting to me compared with your studies."

Once Norris changed gears, improved his grades, graduated college from Atlanta University, and began to help his father at Atlanta Life during summer breaks in Savannah, Alonzo wrote:

"I could not help tears coming in to my eyes when I read your letter, and thought of the promise to take the burden from my shoulders. How glad I am that you begin to see things as a man and not as a child."

== Private life ==
Herndon was extraordinarily reclusive. Herndon rarely spoke publicly, avoiding appearances at national conventions or on society pages. Herndon was generally considered incognito by his Atlanta Life Insurance employees.

Deemed by many gossip columnists as "the world's most eligible bachelor", Herndon was never linked to any women. Many stories regarded him as elusive and mysterious.

Although the public had no idea Herndon was gay, his close friends and business colleagues acknowledged Herndon as an ultra-private gay man. Like many prominent gay African-American men of this era, Herndon's sexuality was largely considered an "open secret", with efforts made to minimize "hint of any scandalize behavior to threaten the precarious image of larger African American community."

Alonzo Herndon, a creature of white Victorian American society's preoccupation with manhood, piety, and self-control, was both aware and disturbed by Norris' alleged sexual orientation. A strict father, Alonzo urged Norris to deny himself and stay "the straight and narrow course." In a letter to his son Norris, Alonzo wrote: "I had been warning you about getting too many shows and other frivolities in your head. Now quit everything but something that pertains to your lessons and try and get yourself together".

As suggested by Herndon biographer Pamela Flores, Norris Herndon was part of post-Victorian generation more "comfortable challenging the conventionality and inevitability of marriage and their open acceptance of a growing gay subculture". Herndon never married and kept his personal life very private.

In her work, "Alonzo and Norris Herndon: The Herndon Men Defining Masculinity by Challenging Societal Norms," Pamela Flores notes:

Along with an early-twentieth-century society that had no tolerance for what it considered deviant or gender nonconformity, [Norris Herndon] lived a secret life, although, Norris would be profiled as one of the most eligible African American bachelors in the country. African- American periodical Ebony emphasized Norris’s secrecy and elusiveness, call him "the millionaire nobody knows," a man "available to a select group of intimates and executives, who guard his whereabouts with the passion of secret service men protecting the president."

His silence is not surprising given the climate of the McCarthy era and his position as the sole heir to an African American fortune in a racially divided city. In Atlanta Life Insurance Company, Alexa Benson Henderson argues that "a distinctive humanitarian and philanthropist influence emanated from Norris," and "he chose to make his participation quiet and unobtrusive." This agrees nicely with the assertion put forward by historian John Howard. Howard’s idea suggests that there was secrecy amongst queers and remarkable silence with regard to homosexuality in American society as whole during the early twentieth century.

Hence, Norris would assume a comprised selfhood, his sexuality arrested, denied, or expressed in secret. There lies conclusive evidence that would satisfy any historian that examines John Howard’s oral history based project Men Like That: A Southern Queer History. For unknown reasons, almost all of the interviewees in Howard’s study described a covert approach to coping with homosexuality as young men came of age in the first half of the century."

== Death ==
Herndon died at home in his bed on June 7, 1977, after being found non-responsive after a heart attack. He is interred in the South View Cemetery in Atlanta, Georgia.

At the time of his death, the Atlanta Life Insurance Company held over $100 million in assets.

Jesse Hill, a University of Michigan graduate and company actuary, replaced Herndon as Atlanta Life's president. The ascension of a non-Herndon family member to the top leadership post heralded a new era in expanding Atlanta Life's business model. Still operating today, Atlanta Life Insurance Company operates as the Atlanta Life Financial Group.
