= Herndon Building =

- U.S. Historic district – Contributing property
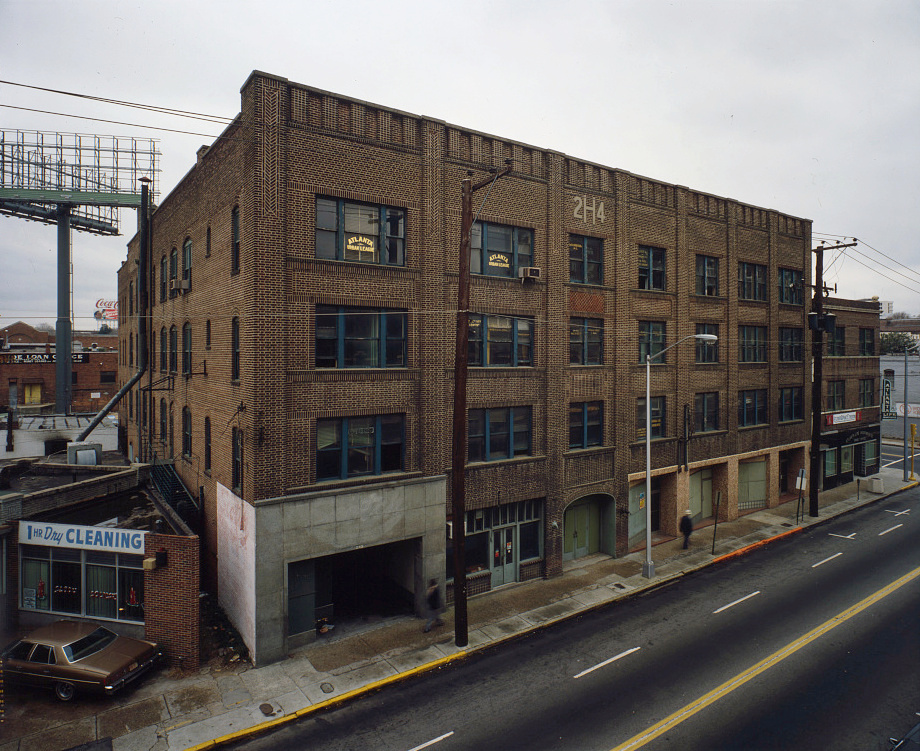
- July 1979 HABS picture, taken from third floor of Odd Fellows Building

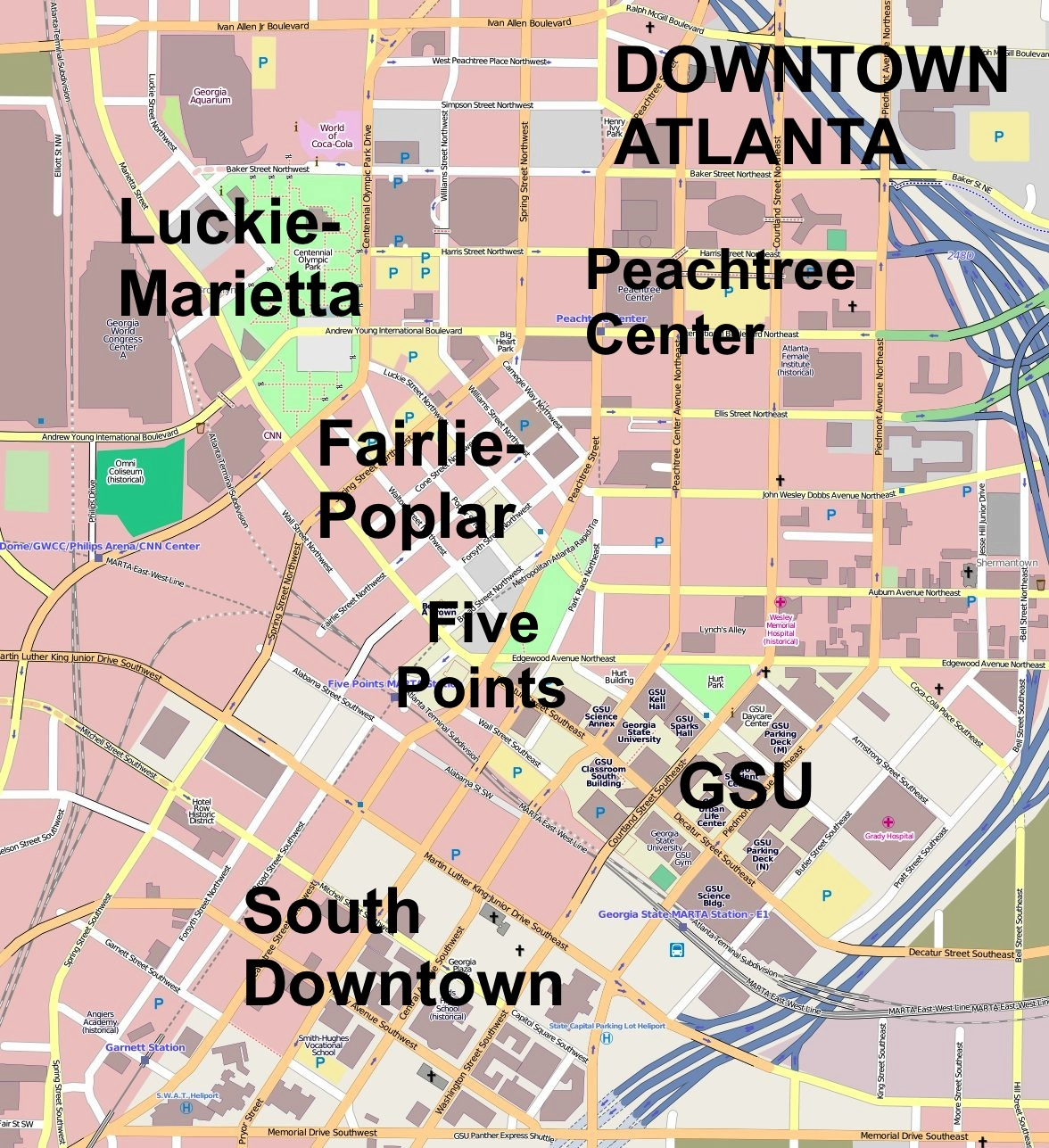
- Location within Downtown Atlanta Location within Atlanta Location within Georgia Location within the United States
- Location: 251 Auburn Avenue, Atlanta, Georgia
- Coordinates: 33.7553°N 84.3799°W
- Built: 1925
- Part of: Sweet Auburn Historic District (ID76000631)
- Added to NRHP: December 8, 1976

The Herndon Building was a contributing property in the Sweet Auburn Historic District of Atlanta, Georgia, located across Auburn Avenue from the Odd Fellows Building and Auditorium.

Begun in 1924 and completed the following year, it was a three-story L-shaped brick building, "easily recognized by the large H located on the front facade of the building". It was used as a professional building by several different business people, including a doctor's office and a pharmacy.

Vacant and collapsing (shown on Google Maps and Street View), it was already under consideration to become a condemned property when it was seriously damaged in the 2008 Atlanta tornado. It was demolished in late April 2008 as a direct result of this. The 2008 tornado also passed very close to the Herndon Home, 1 mile (1.6 km) west of the Herndon Building.

The Butler Street YMCA owns the property, and is located to the southwest of it just across Jesse Hill Jr. Drive. The YMCA has not announced any plans for the vacant Herndon Building site.

The Herndon Building was one of three contributing properties in the historic district which were associated with the life of Alonzo Herndon. The Atlanta Life Insurance Company Building and the Rucker Building are the other two.
