= Prince Hall Masonic Temple (Atlanta, Georgia) =

Historic building in Atlanta's Sweet Auburn district

- Prince Hall Masonic Grand Lodge
- U.S. National Historic Landmark District – Contributing property
- U.S. National Historic Site
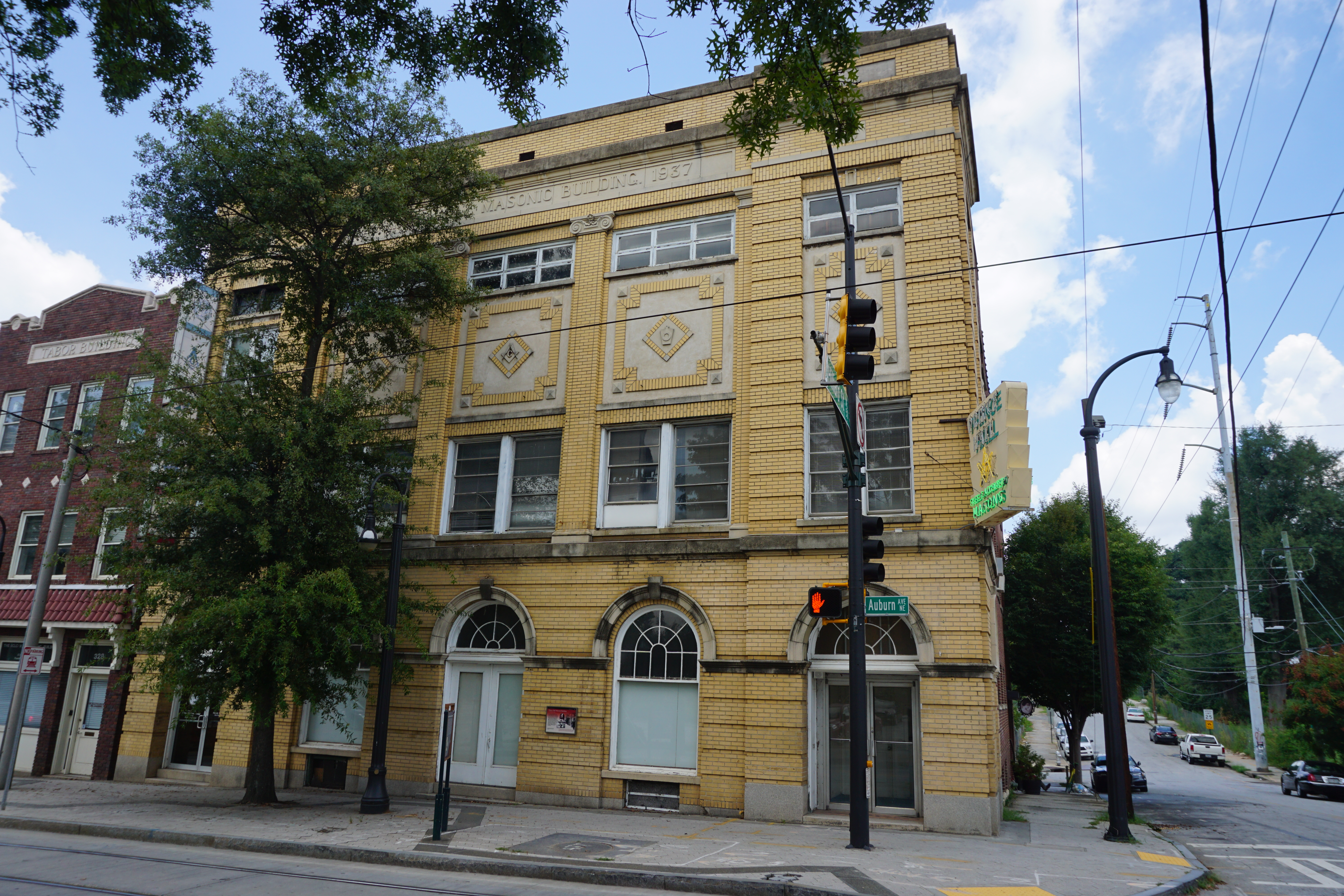

- Location within Atlanta Location within Georgia Location within the United States
- Location: 330 Auburn Avenue, Atlanta, Georgia
- Coordinates: 33.7556°N 84.37680°W
- Built: 1937-1940; 1941
- Part of: Martin Luther King Jr. National Historical Park and Preservation District (ID74000677)
- Designated NHLDCP: October 10, 1980

The Prince Hall Masonic Grand Lodge in Atlanta, Georgia started in construction in 1937 and was completed in 1940. It is a historic Prince Hall Masonic building located at 330 Auburn Avenue and was added to the Martin Luther King Jr. National Historical Park in 2018.

== History ==
The building of the lodge was spearheaded by Atlanta civic leader John Wesley Dobbs. An African American Masonic organization, its building was supported by the community. In addition to the Prince Hall Lodge, room was let to one of Madam C.J. Walker's Beauty Shoppes, as well as, the WERD radio station. The Southern Christian Leadership Conference civil rights organization opened its first headquarters in the building in 1957. Martin Luther King, Jr worked out of a windowless office in the building for many years. The building was a rare safe haven to hold meetings for black organizations during the Jim Crow era.

The Sweet Auburn Historic District in which the building resides was designated as a National Historic Landmark District in 1976. The building became listed on the National Register of Historic Places as a contributing building in the National Historic Landmark District in 1980.

A partnership with the Martin Luther King Jr. National Historical Park began in 2019 to interpret King’s activities with the SCLC in that building. The Temple underwent a $14 million renovation to preserve and restore much of the original character, led by the Trust for Public Land, which opened to the public in the spring of 2026.

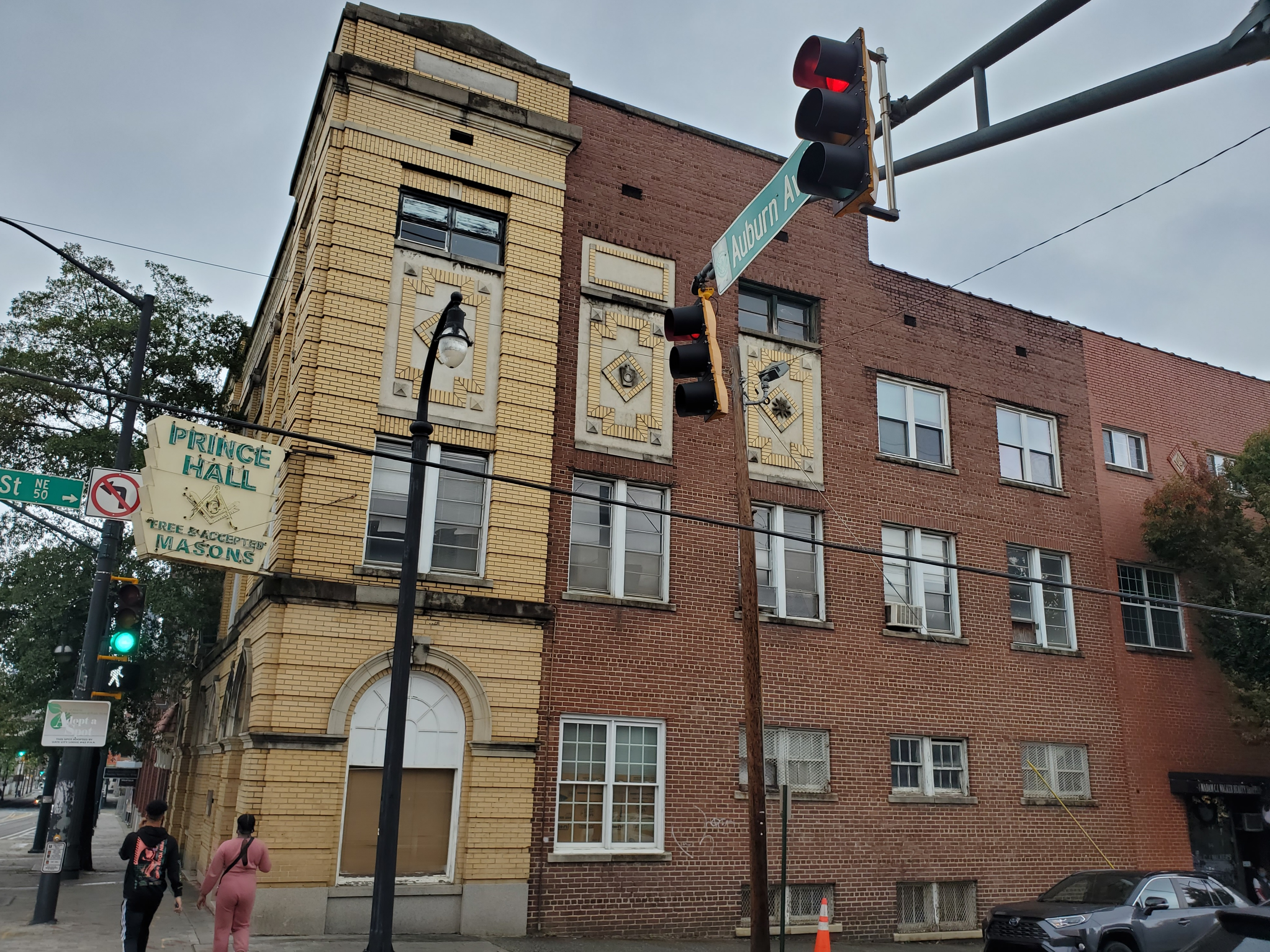
View of historic sign

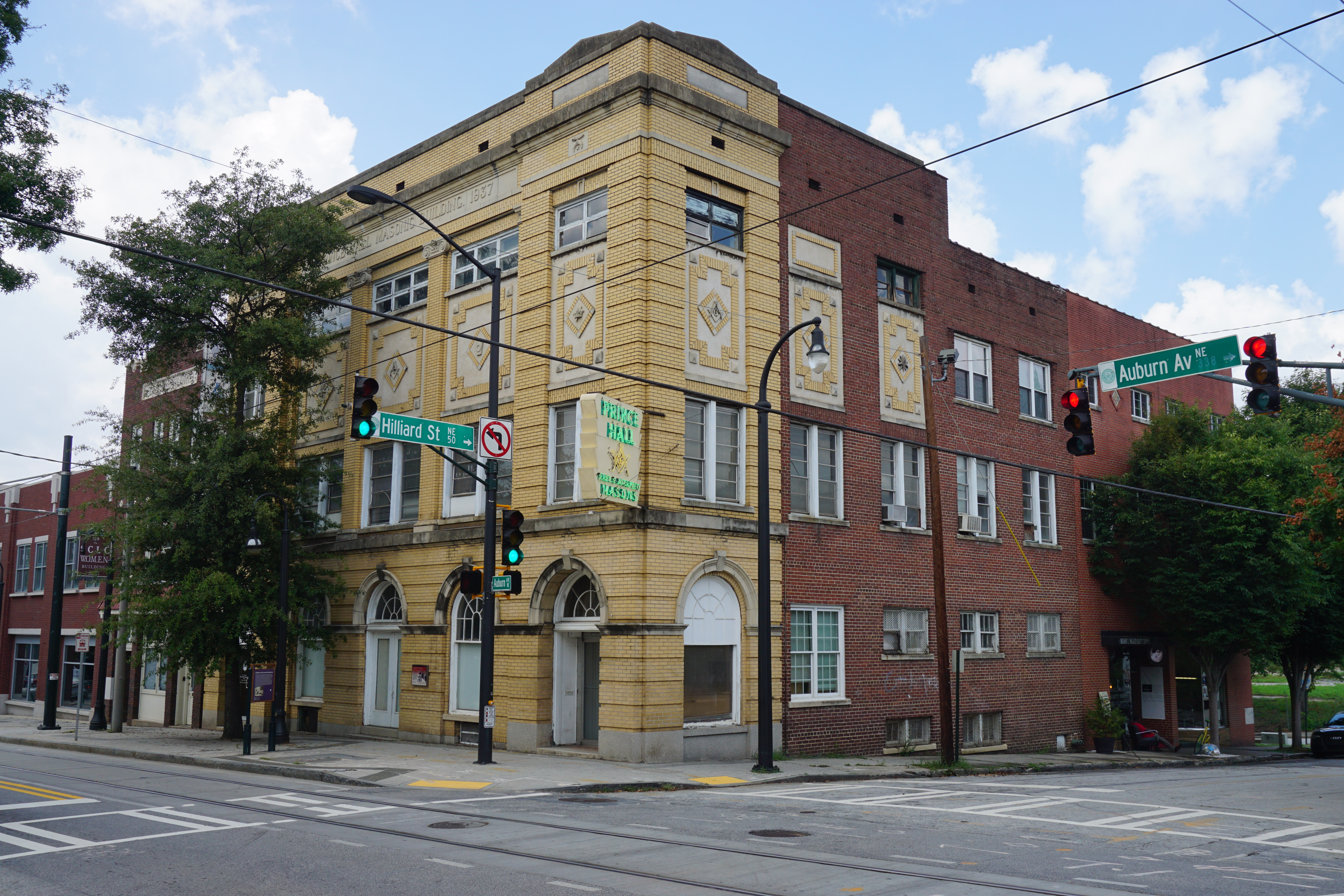
Another view of the masonic lodge
