= Adrienne McNeil Herndon =

American actress, professor and activist

Adrienne Herndon
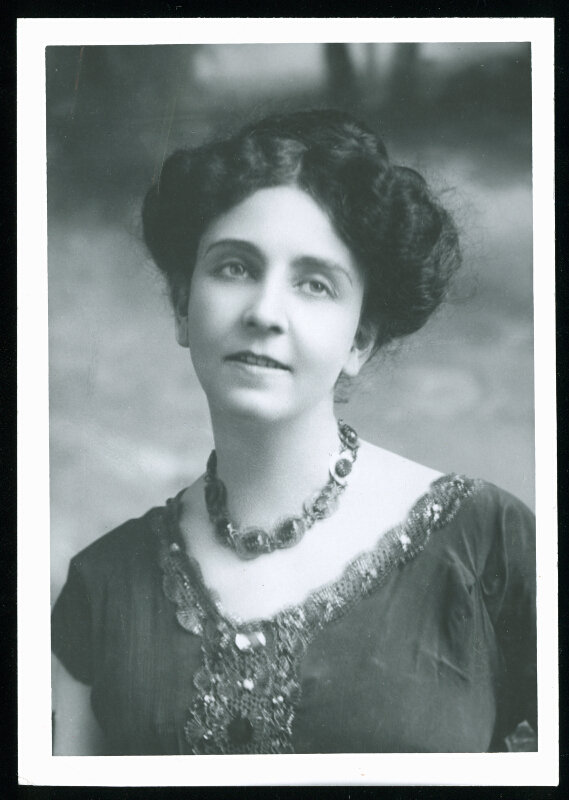
- Herndon in 1891
- Born: Adrienne Elizabeth McNeil; July 22, 1869; Savannah, Georgia
- Died: April 6, 1910 (aged 40); Atlanta, Georgia
- Other name: Anne Du Bignon

Adrienne Elizabeth McNeil Herndon (1869–1910) was an actress, professor, and activist in Atlanta, Georgia. While admittedly an African American to friends and colleagues, she performed with the stage name Anne Du Bignon. She was one of the first African American faculty at Atlanta University, where she was a peer of W. E. B. Du Bois. She was married to prominent businessman Alonzo Herndon.

== Early life and education ==
Adrienne Elizabeth McNeil was born on July 22, 1869, in Augusta, Georgia, to the unwed couple Martha Fleming and George Stevens. Her mother, seventeen at the time of her birth, was a domestic servant and seamstress who had been born into slavery, while her father was a light-skinned man who abandoned the family shortly after Herndon's birth. She is described by historian Rebecca Burns as "short and lithe with a lively manner and sophisticated bearing with her creamy skin, wavy brown hair, and dark eyes, Adrienne moved easily and kept her racial background a secret". She was about five feet tall.

At the age of two, Herndon moved to Savannah after her mother married Archibald James McNeil and had two children with him, Jennie Olive and Willie. She attended West Broad Street School, Savannah's first elementary school for African American children. Herndon was skilled at drama and recitation at a young age, but rarely received praise at home, as her mother felt that these skills would have been more impressive if she were a boy.

Herndon began attending the Normal Department of Atlanta University (now Clark Atlanta University), and paid her tuition through financial aid and money earned from a summer teaching job in Greensboro, Georgia. She was a successful student, graduating in 1890 with a distinction in oratory skills, and was even invited to perform an essay and a song during the 1891 commencement ceremony.

== Musical and dramatic performances ==
In 1894, shortly after her marriage to Alonzo Herndon, Herndon traveled to Boston to study at the Boston School of Expression. She would continue her studies there over the course of several summers, and completed the program in 1904, making her professional stage debut (under the name Anne Du Bignon) in a one-woman show of Antony and Cleopatra at Steinert Hall. Herndon embraced her racial ambiguity, and described her background as French and Creole in the press. Her performance was reviewed positively, and critic Henry Clapp of The Boston Herald even introduced her to producer David Belasco, who wrote that she would make a "fine character actress."

Herndon hired an agent with the hopes of moving her career to the London theater scene, and performed two additional engagements in Lynn, Massachusetts, and Bellow Falls, Vermont, but her additional attempts to meet with Belasco failed, potentially due to the discovery of her race.

Prior to beginning her teaching tenure at Atlanta University in the fall of 1895, Herndon was celebrated in a week-long bazaar in her hometown of Savannah, which included a musical performance. She also performed an ode by D.W. Davis at the Atlanta Exposition in October 1895.

After the Atlanta Race Riot of 1906, in which her husband's barbershop was vandalized and two of his employees killed, Herndon and her family left Georgia and lived briefly in Philadelphia before moving to New York City in 1907. In New York, Herndon studied at the American Academy of Dramatic Arts; despite beginning in the middle of the school session, she graduated in May 1908 and earned the Belasco Gold Medal from the school.

== Teaching career ==
After graduating from Atlanta, Herndon spent four months teaching at the Georgia State College for Negroes (now Savannah State University), temporarily located in Athens. She then returned to Atlanta to teach at Gray Street School, an elementary school for African Americans. After her marriage to Alonzo Herndon in 1893, she was no longer eligible to teach at the school.

In the fall of 1895, Herndon joined the faculty of Atlanta University, making her the first African-American female faculty member. Her friend, George Towns, a Harvard-educated professor of literature, joined the faculty at the same time, making them the first two African American professors at the university; two years later, they would be joined by W.E.B. Du Bois.

At Atlanta, Herndon was "the first director of dramatics and teacher of elocution" from 1895, until her death in 1910. Teaching physical exercises, voice drills, and public speaking, she transformed the practice of elocution, then a required component of the Atlanta curriculum. She also incorporated breathing methods and Swedish gymnastics exercises into her courses, to "train the body as a whole and then work upon its parts" as she wrote in 1897. Playwright Errol Hill has described her as a pioneer of teaching and directing Shakespeare, as she introduced the Bard's classic works to the South well before other historically black colleges did. In 1904,The Voice of the Negro highlighted Herndon and her productions of The Taming of the Shrew and The Merchant of Venice, which was performed yearly by the graduating class. Under her direction, student dramatic performances became increasingly popular. In 1900, she initiated an annual speaking contest to be held during the commencement season. At Atlanta, Herndon also mentored Caroline Bond Day, who would go on to be one of the first African-American anthropologists and a faculty member at Atlanta.

== Activism ==
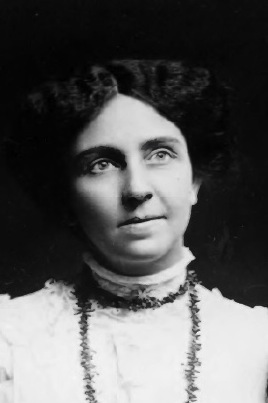
Herndon c. 1910

Herndon supported black suffrage. Du Bois and Adrienne Herndon were colleagues at Atlanta University. In October 1904, Alonzo signed the Ontario Conference led by Du Bois. Adrienne Herndon, in 1905, hosted the "Niagara Movement" organized by Du Bois. She participated in Du Bois's Wheat Street Baptist Church demonstration on November 30, 1905, for the "southern movement" by joining him on the platform. During the Atlanta Riots two of Alonzo's employees were attacked and killed and his barbershop was vandalized. The Tuesday morning after the rioting, Herndon (Note: The source does not specify which.) along with Reverend Henry H. Proctor met with the city mayor and chief of police to discuss safety for victims and justice for the rioters.

Beginning in 1905 Herndon also sat on the board of the Gate City Free Kindergarten Association, a social work group focused on the lack of educational services for young black children that served as the predecessor of Lugenia Burns Hope's Neighborhood Union.

== Marriage and Herndon Home ==
While studying at Atlanta, Herndon first met Alonzo Herndon, a highly successful barber for Atlanta's white elite at the time. Alonzo frequently called upon her at the home of future NAACP Executive Secretary Walter White, where she was temporarily boarding, and they were married in 1893. Herndon accepted his initial proposal on the condition that he would allow her to continue pursuing her training in drama.

In 1897, their only son, Norris B. Herndon, was born.

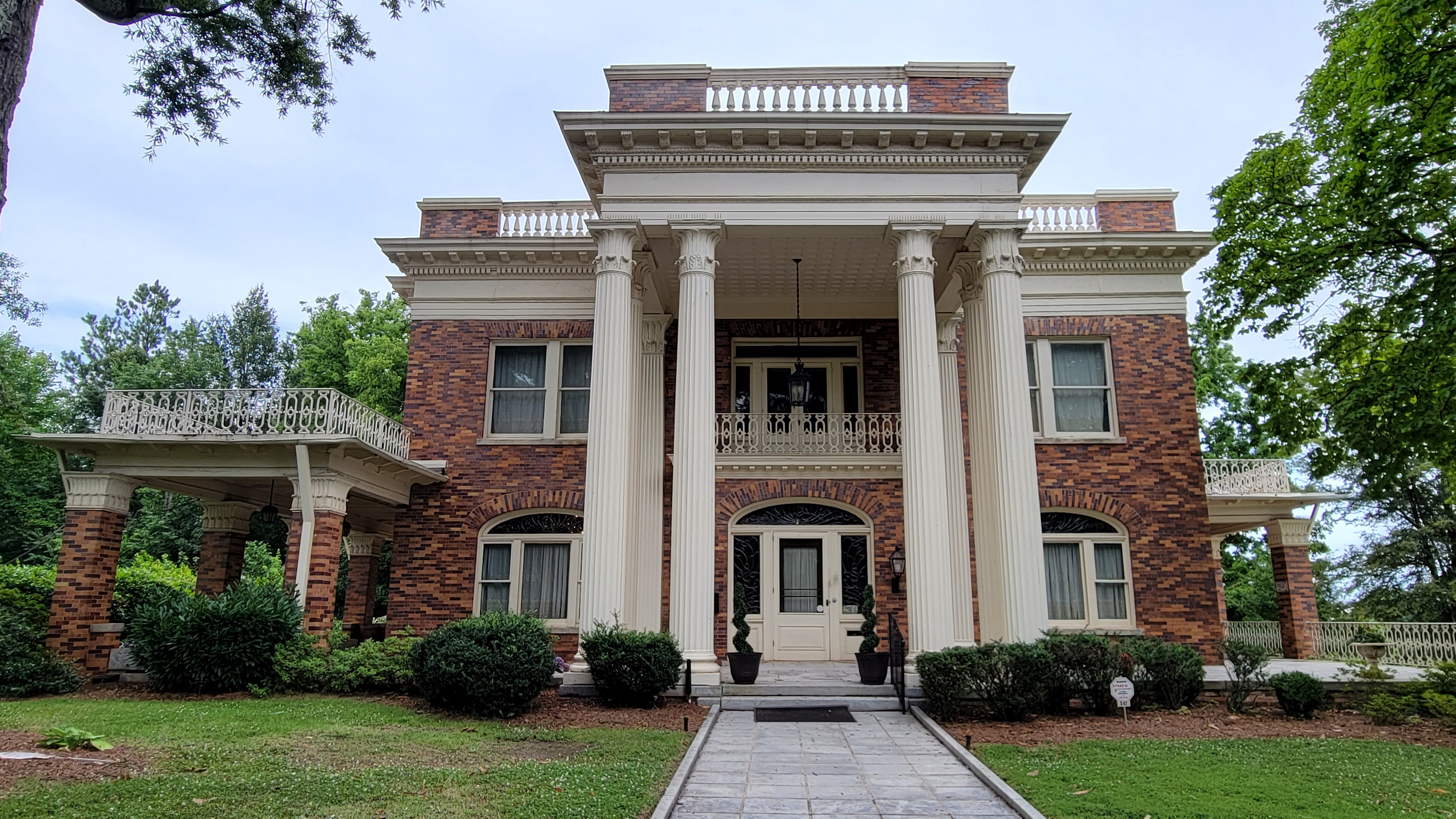
Herndon Home, designed by Adrienne, in Atlanta, Georgia

As the Herndon's became wealthier, they planned to build a home together, a mansion near Atlanta University. Herndon was heavily involved in its planning, working closely with a team of black craftsmen on a Beaux Arts design that included fifteen rooms and a personalized mural of Alonzo's life.

Before the Herndon Home was completed, Herndon died of Addison's disease on April 10, 1910. (Note: According to the Nielson source, she died four weeks after the family moved into the home. According to the National Historic Landmark nomination, she died a week before the home was completed. Is it possible that they moved in before it was completed?) In 1947, her son, Norris, a 1919 graduate of Atlanta University, established the Herndon Foundation, which maintains the house. He helped transform the house into a museum in 1973, and it was declared a U.S. National Historic Landmark in 2000.
