= Odd Fellows Building and Auditorium =

- U.S. National Register of Historic Places
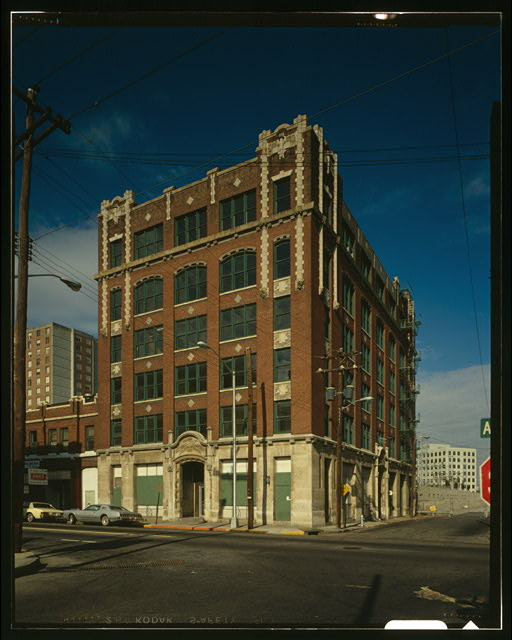
- Front and side elevations, 1979

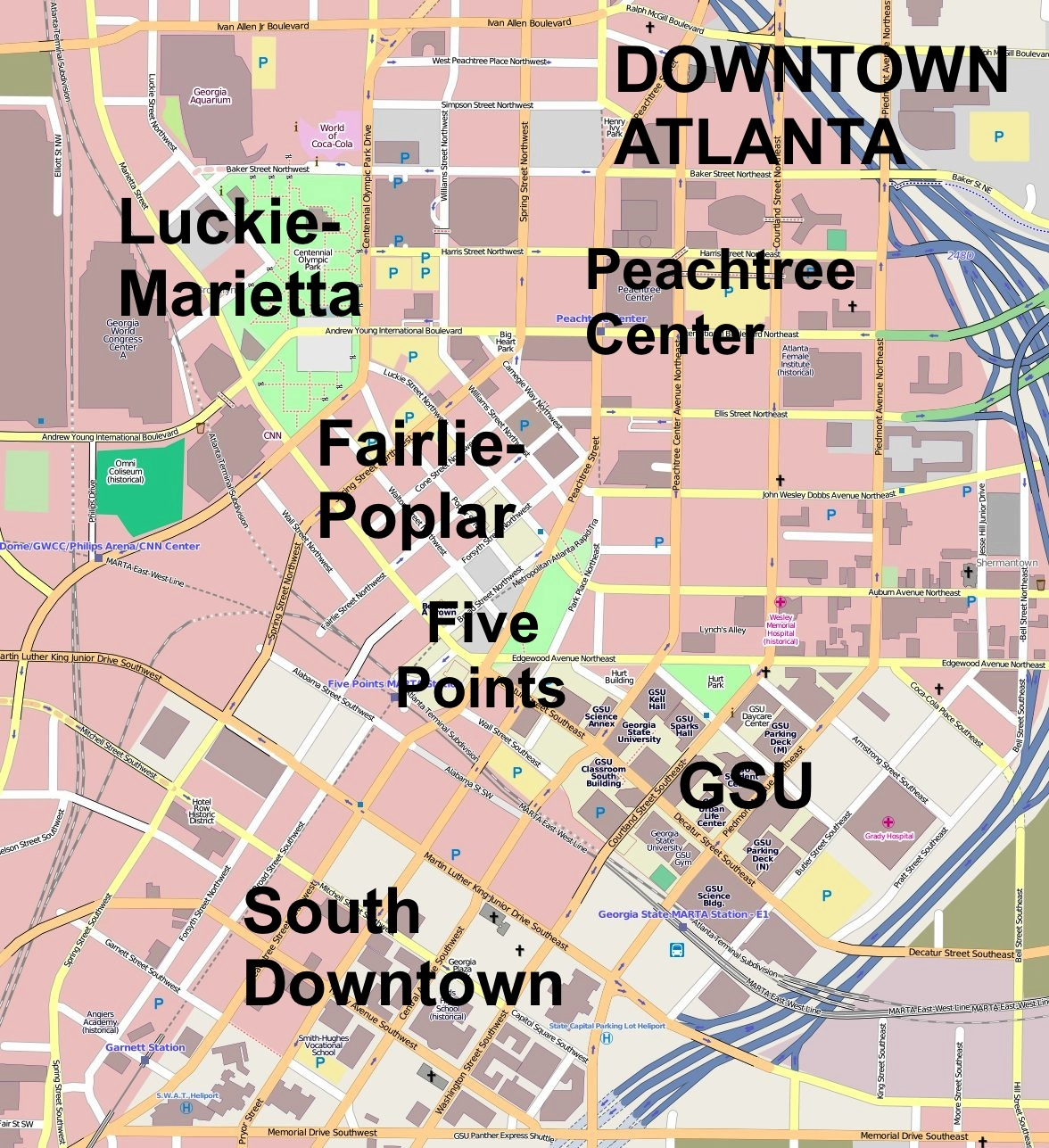
- Location within Downtown Atlanta
- Location: 228–250 Auburn Avenue, NE, Atlanta, Georgia
- Coordinates: 33°45′20″N 84°22′46″W
- Built: Building, 1912; Auditorium, 1913
- Architects: William Augustus Edwards; Robert E. Pharrow, builder
- Architectural style: Tudor Revival, Other, Skyscraper
- NRHP reference No.: 75000594
- Added to NRHP: May 2, 1975

The Odd Fellows Building and Auditorium, located at 228—250 Auburn Avenue, N.E. in the Sweet Auburn Historic District of Atlanta, Georgia, are historic buildings built in 1912 and 1913, respectively, as the headquarters of the District Grand Lodge No. 18, Jurisdiction of Georgia, of the Grand United Order of Odd Fellows in America. B.S. Ingram was District Grand Master and Dr. William F. Penn was chairman of the building committee. Renowned Atlanta-based architect William Augustus Edwards designed the buildings, while Robert E. Pharrow was the contractor and M.B. Morton was superintendent of construction. Booker T. Washington dedicated the Odd Fellows Building in 1912.

The Odd Fellows Building and Auditorium are closely linked with Benjamin Jefferson Davis, Sr. (1870–1945), Atlanta's most influential black journalist, who edited the Atlanta Independent, the official organ of District No. 18. He was District Grand Secretary and a member of the Building Committee when they were built.

The Odd Fellows Building, called the Tower, is six stories high while the Auditorium next door, called the Annex, is two stories with an atrium that adds another two or three stories in height. Both are built of redbrick except for the first floor of the Tower which is stone. The Annex was used for many years as a movie house and was the only major venue in Atlanta where blacks could be seated on the main floor. In addition to providing meeting and office space for the Odd Fellows, the tower provided office and store space for black-owned businesses and black professionals. Its flat roof was used for dances for many years.

On May 2, 1975, both buildings were added to the National Register of Historic Places.

== See also ==
- Herndon Building, formerly located across the street
- National Register of Historic Places listings in Fulton County, Georgia
- List of Odd Fellows buildings
- Odd Fellows Hall (disambiguation)
