= Herndon Home =

Museum in Atlanta, Georgia

- U.S. National Register of Historic Places
- U.S. National Historic Landmark
- Atlanta Landmark Building
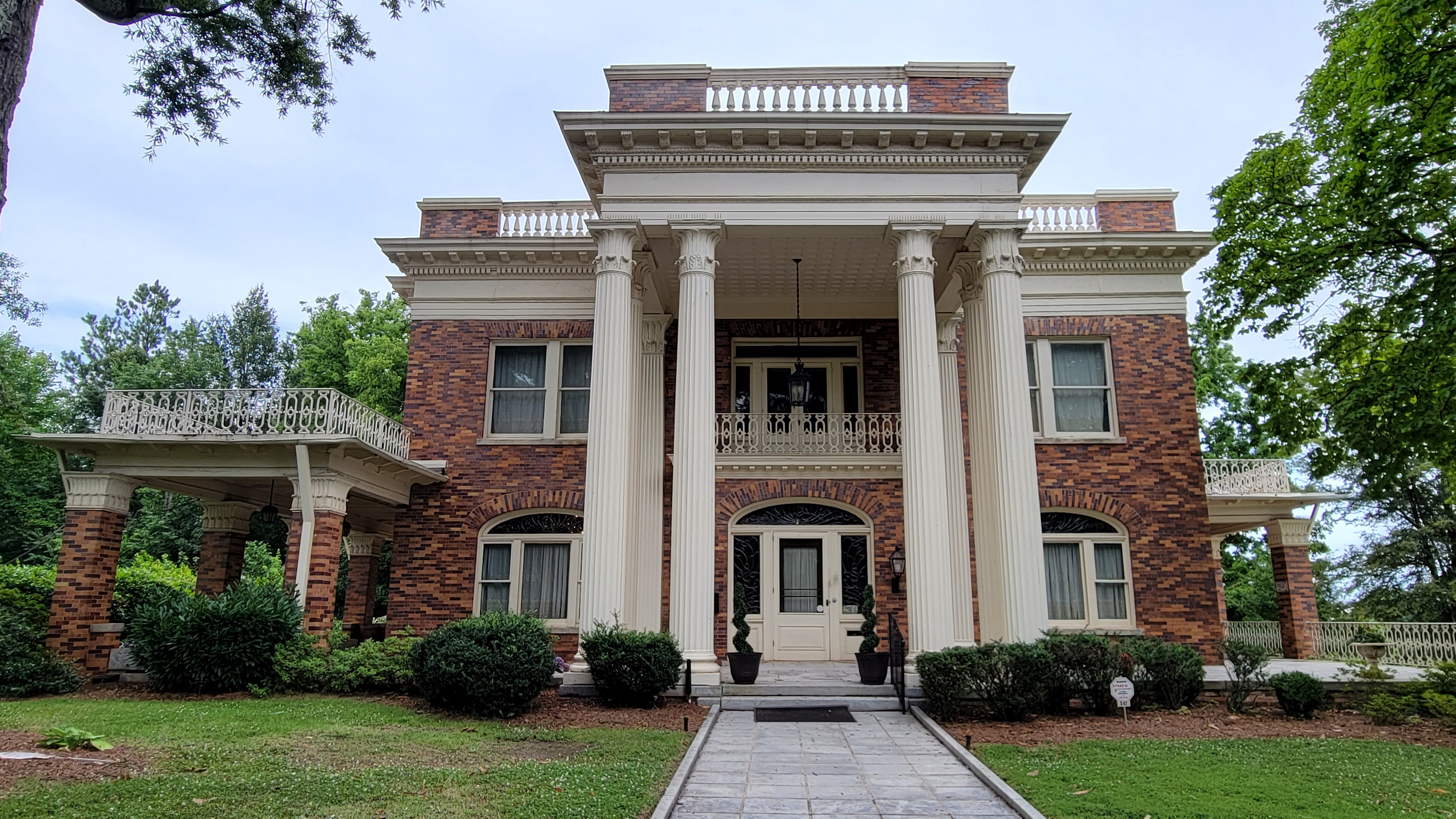

- Location within Atlanta Location within Georgia Location within the United States
- Location: 587 University Place, NW, Atlanta, Georgia
- Coordinates: 33.75581°N 84.40686°W
- Built: 1910
- Architect: Adrienne McNeil Herndon
- Architectural style: Classical Revival
- NRHP reference No.: 00000261

Significant dates
- Added to NRHP: February 16, 2000
- Designated NHL: February 16, 2000
- Designated ALB: October 14, 1989

The Herndon Home is a historic house museum and National Historic Landmark at 587 University Place NW, in Atlanta, Georgia. An elegant Classical Revival mansion with Beaux Arts influences, it was the home of Alonzo Franklin Herndon (1858-1927), a rags-to-riches success story who was born into slavery, but went on to become Atlanta's first black millionaire as founder and head of the Atlanta Life Insurance Company. The house was designed by his wife Adrienne, and was almost entirely built with African-American labor. The house was declared a National Historic Landmark in 2000, and had previously been declared a "landmark building exterior" by the city of Atlanta in 1989.

== Description and history ==
The Herndon Home is located in Atlanta's Vine City neighborhood, adjacent to the campus of Morris Brown College (formerly the campus of Atlanta University) on the north side of University Place NW. It is a two-story rectangular structure, faced in brick, with a flat, balustraded roof, porches projecting from the sides, and a massive neoclassical entrance portico, supported by large paired columns. The entrance is framed by wide sidelight windows and topped by a semi-oval transom, all windows displaying etching and tracery. The building is capped by a full entablature and modillioned cornice. The flat roof is usable as an open terrace, although it was reported to be in poor condition in 2000. The building interior is elaborately fitted with original period wood, stone, and plaster. The main living rooms have murals on the wall depicting elements of the Herndon family history.

The house was built in 1910 for Alonzo and Adrienne Herndon. Much of the building's design is credited to Adrienne, who was a drama teacher at Atlanta University, and had intended the rooftop terrace, from which the university campus was visible, as a performance venue. According to available documentation, all of the work on the mansion, except for its electrical and plumbing systems, was performed by African-American laborers and contractors.

Alonzo Herndon was born into slavery in 1858, and was freed, while still a child, by the American Civil War. From this virtually penniless beginning, Herndon built a chain of barbershops in Atlanta, and in 1905 founded the Atlanta Life Insurance Company, which grew to become the nation's largest African-American-owned insurance company, and made him a millionaire. Herndon's son Norris continued to run Atlanta Life until his own death in 1955.

The vacant Herndon Building on Auburn Avenue, where Alonzo built his business, was seriously damaged in the 2008 Atlanta tornado (which also passed very close to the Herndon Home), and was demolished in late April 2008. The Herndon Building was one of three contributing properties in the Sweet Auburn Historic District associated with the life of Alonzo Herndon. The Atlanta Life Insurance Company Building and the Rucker Building are the other two.

== Herndon Foundation ==
The Herndon Home is now owned by the nonprofit Alonzo F. and Norris B. Herndon Foundation, which since 1983 has operated the home. The home is open for tours. The foundation supports entrepreneurship.

== See also ==
- List of National Historic Landmarks in Georgia (U.S. state)
- National Register of Historic Places listings in Fulton County, Georgia
