= Sweet Auburn =

- Sweet Auburn Historic District
- U.S. National Register of Historic Places
- U.S. National Historic Landmark District
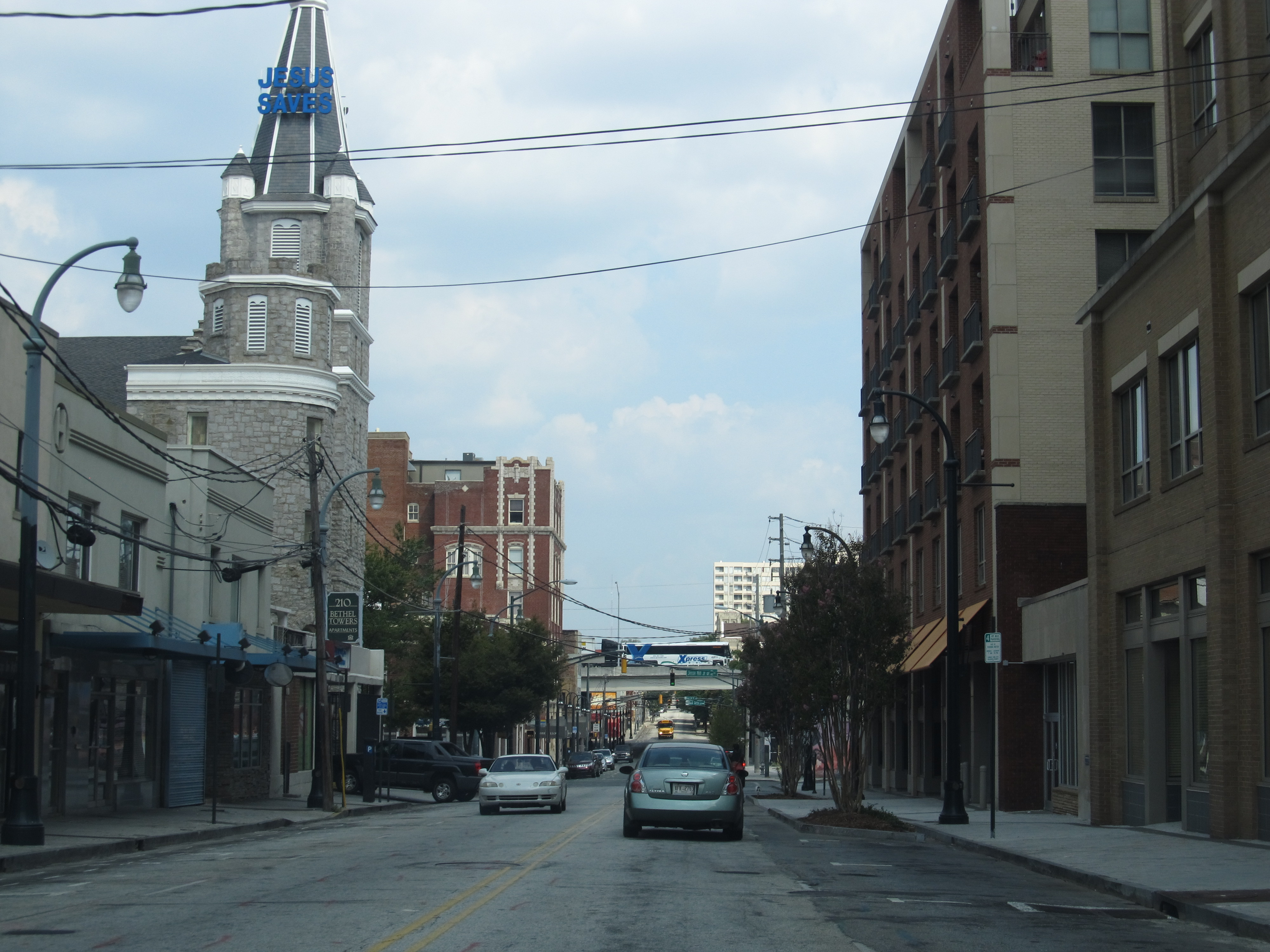
- Auburn Avenue, toward the Old Fourth Ward

- Location within Atlanta Location within Georgia Location within the United States
- Location: Atlanta, Georgia
- Coordinates: 33.75483°N 84.38131°W
- Area: 19 acres (7.7 ha)
- Built: 1865
- Architectural style: Late 19th- & 20th-Century Revival
- NRHP reference No.: 76000631

Significant dates
- Added to NRHP: December 8, 1976
- Designated NHLD: December 8, 1976

The Sweet Auburn Historic District is a historic African-American neighborhood along and surrounding Auburn Avenue, east of downtown Atlanta, Georgia, United States. The name Sweet Auburn was coined by John Wesley Dobbs, referring to the "richest Negro street in the world," one of the largest concentrations of African-American businesses in the United States.

A National Historic Landmark District was designated in 1976, covering 19 acres (7.7 ha) of the neighborhood, significant for its history and development as a segregated area under the state's Jim Crow laws. Sweet Auburn was also added to the National Register of Historic Places the same year.

== Geography ==
Sweet Auburn is one of 242 officially recognized neighborhoods of Atlanta. It is bounded by:

- Freedom Parkway and the Old Fourth Ward (formerly the separate Bedford Pine neighborhood) on the north
- Boulevard and the Old Fourth Ward on the east
- the MARTA east–west line and the Oakland and Grant Park neighborhoods on the south, and
- the Downtown Connector and downtown Atlanta on the west

== History ==
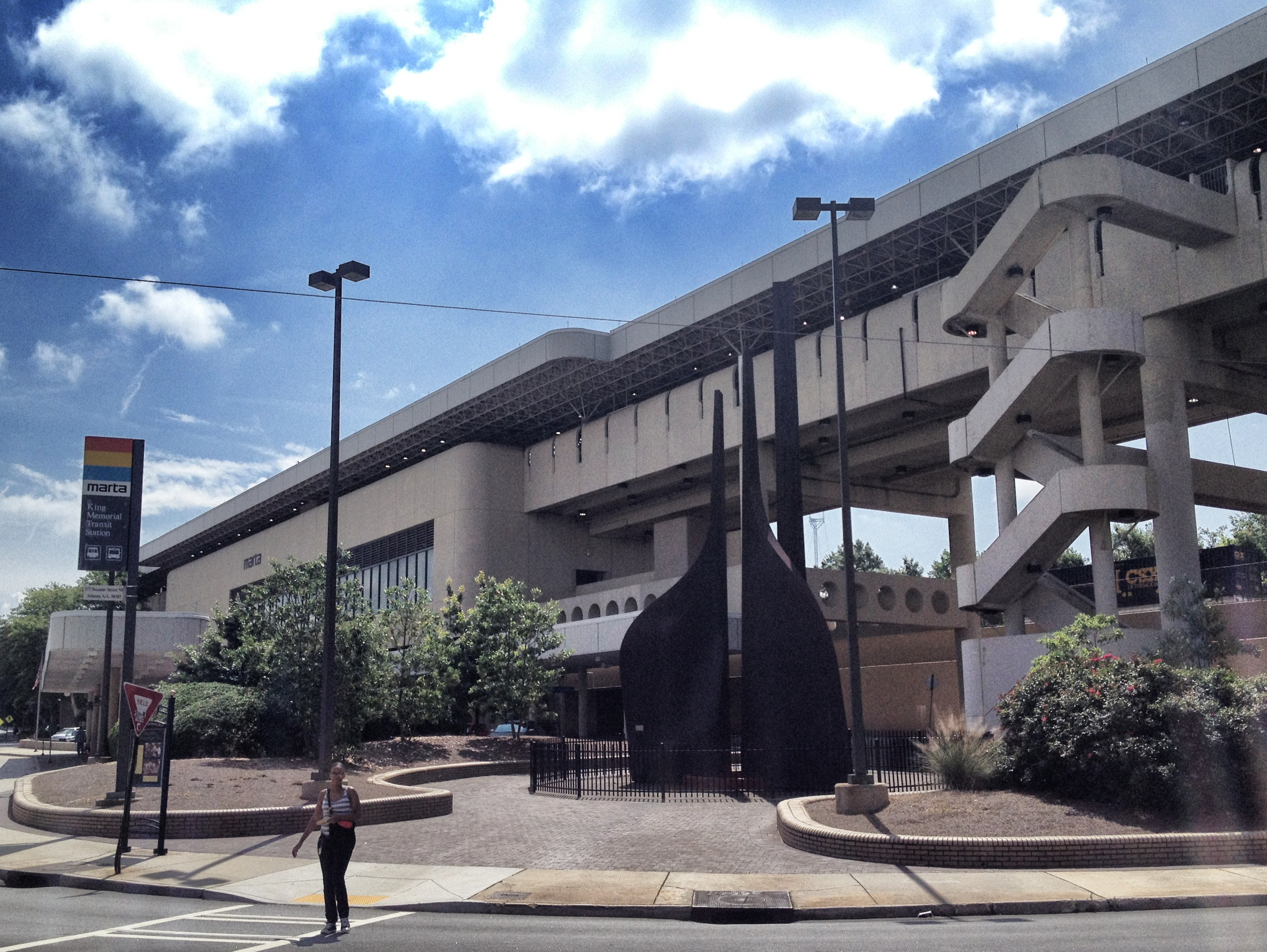
King Memorial station

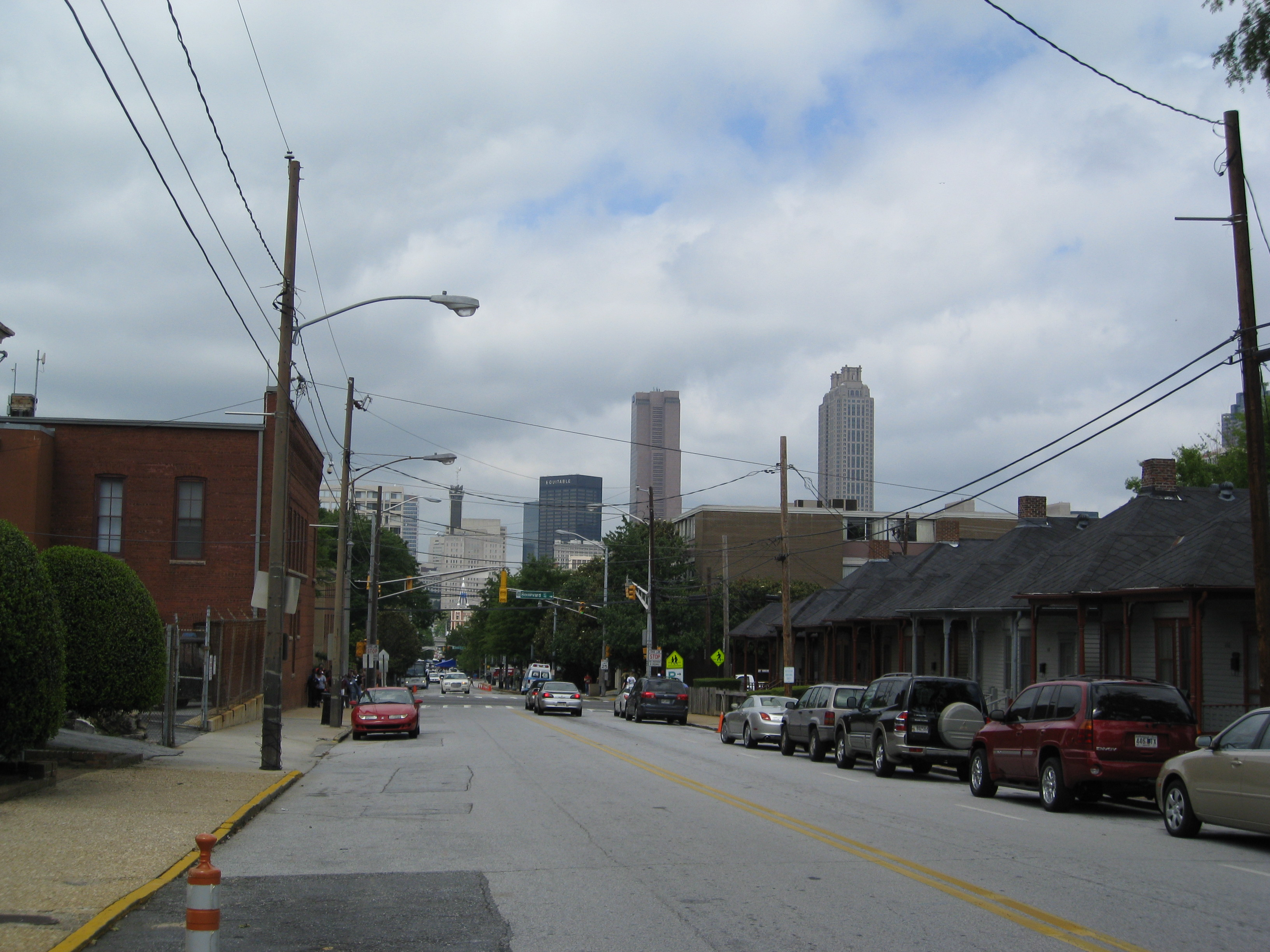
Auburn Avenue, toward downtown Atlanta

The first settlement here was on land formerly occupied by Union troops and was called Shermantown for many years. It developed quickly being near the Georgia Railroad and in 1879 was at the endpoint of a newly graded road called simply Boulevard, which led from the railroad to North Avenue near Ponce de Leon Avenue and Angier Springs.

The rise of Auburn Avenue as "the" black business district in Atlanta was to a great extent an outcome of the 1906 Atlanta Race Riot. Prior to this time black businesses operated largely in downtown Atlanta — a business district integrated as far as business ownership was concerned. But competition between working-class whites and blacks for jobs and housing gave rise to fears and tensions. In 1906, print media fueled these tensions with hearsay about alleged sexual assaults on white women by black men, triggering the riot, which left at least 27 people dead (25 of them black) and over 70 injured.

Black businesses started to move from previously integrated business district downtown to the relative safety of the area around the Atlanta University Center west of downtown, and to Auburn Avenue in the Fourth Ward east of downtown. "Sweet" Auburn Avenue became home to Alonzo Herndon's Atlanta Mutual, the city's first black-owned life insurance company, and to a celebrated concentration of black businesses, newspapers, churches, and nightclubs. In 1956, Fortune magazine called Sweet Auburn "the richest Negro street in the world", a phrase originally coined by civil rights leader John Wesley Dobbs from the poem The Deserted Village by Oliver Goldsmith. Sweet Auburn and Atlanta's black colleges formed the nexus of a prosperous black middle class and upper class which arose despite enormous social and legal obstacles.

Sweet Auburn was designated a National Historic Landmark in 1976. However, like so many other inner-city neighborhoods, Sweet Auburn fell victim to lack of investment, heavy, widespread crime, homelessness, and abandonment, compounded by construction of the Downtown Connector freeway that split it in two. In 1992 the National Trust for Historic Preservation recognized that it was one of America's 11 Most Endangered Historic Places and, in 2005, the Georgia Trust for Historic Preservation included the area in its 2006 list of Places in Peril. The Historic District Development Corporation (HDDC) was formed to turn the trend around, starting with houses surrounding the birth home of Dr. Martin Luther King Jr., and working outward. In 2014, the city of Atlanta completed the installation of the Atlanta Streetcar, a line that creates a loop connecting the Martin Luther King Jr. National Historical Park to downtown and the tourist attractions of Centennial Olympic Park. The streetcar travels east along Edgewood Avenue and west along Auburn Avenue.

== Historic structures and businesses ==
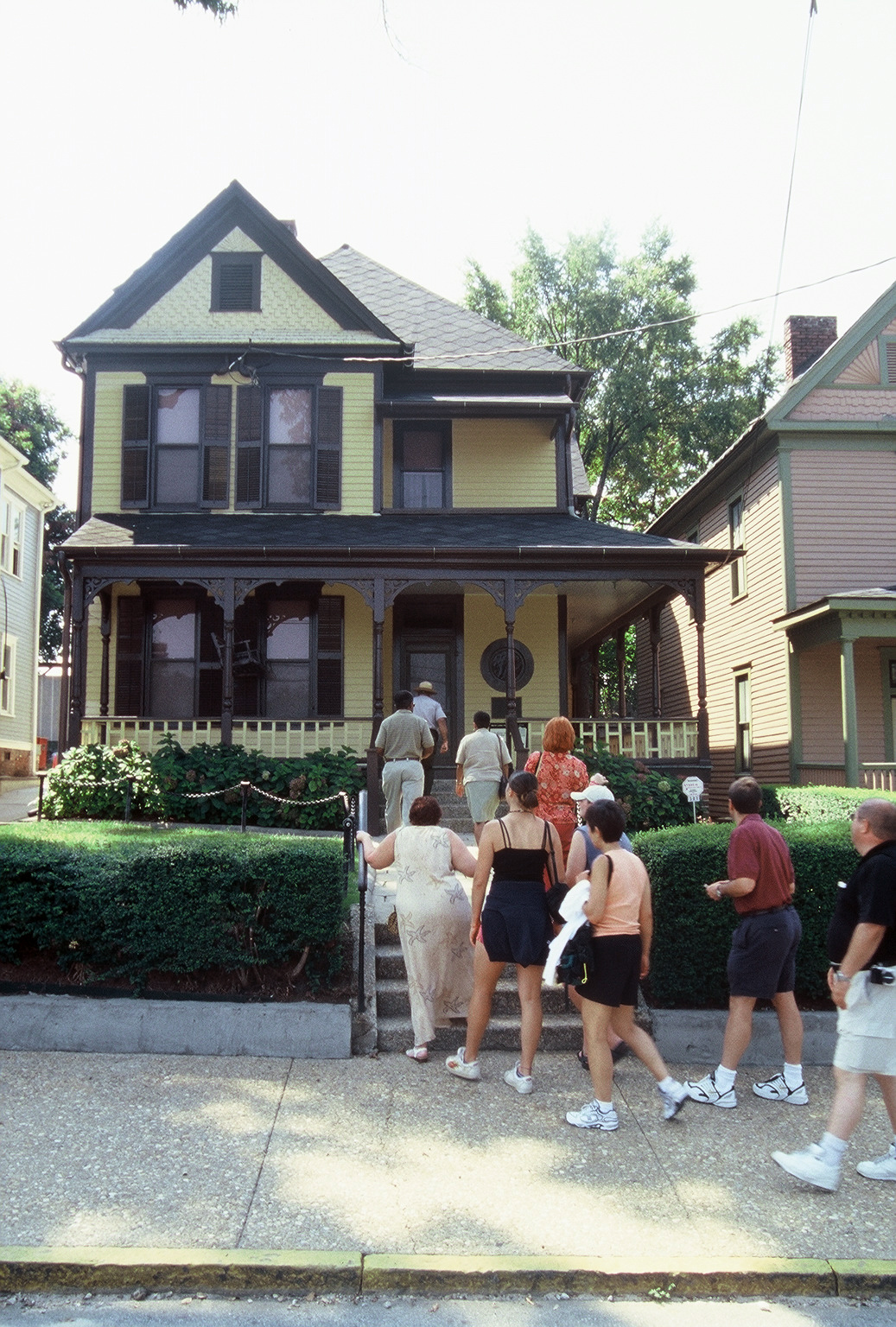
Visitors at the Martin Luther King Jr. National Historical Park

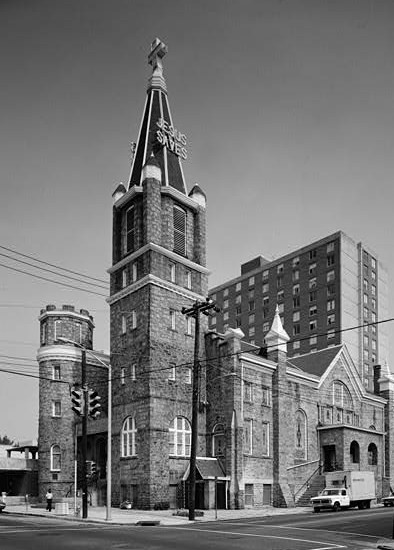
Big Bethel African Methodist Episcopal Church

Several churches located along the avenue, such as Big Bethel AME and First Congregational, helped build and maintain the heritage of the street. Our Lady of Lourdes Catholic Church, located just off the avenue, was also a significant force as the first Black Catholic parish in the city.

The Royal Peacock Club provided an elegant setting where many African Americans could perform and bring the changing styles of black popular music to Atlanta. Originally called the Top Hat Club when it opened in 1938, the club hosted local talent and national acts such as B.B. King, the Four Tops, the Tams and Atlanta's own Gladys Knight.

One of the many significant commercial buildings within the district is the Atlanta Life Insurance Company. The second-largest black insurance company in the United States, Atlanta Life Insurance was founded in 1905 by Alonzo Herndon, a former slave from Walton County, Georgia. The central building of the Atlanta Life Insurance Company complex is a Beaux Arts building facing Auburn Avenue. The district also includes the Rucker Building, Atlanta's first black-owned office building, constructed in 1904 by Henry A. Rucker, a former slave turned businessman and politician.

Also located on Auburn Avenue was The Atlanta Daily World, the first black-owned daily newspaper, which was founded here in 1928. (The Atlanta Daily World is still the nation's longest running African American newspaper.) In 1948, the Atlanta Police Department was integrated, hiring eight black police officers, all of whom were assigned to Auburn Avenue.

=== List of historical churches and businesses ===
- APEX Museum – founded in 1985
- Atlanta Daily World – founded in 1928
- Atlanta Life Insurance – founded in 1905
- Big Bethel AME Church – founded in 1847
- Ebenezer Baptist Church – founded in 1886
- Herndon Building – opened in 1924, demolished following damage from 2008 Atlanta tornado
- Martin Luther King Jr. National Historical Park, including:
  - Dr. King's birth (January 15, 1929) home – built in 1895
  - Visitors Center – founded in 1980
- Odd Fellows Building and Auditorium – 1912–13
- Our Lady of Lourdes Catholic Church, founded in 1912
- Prince Hall Masonic Temple- built 1937/1941 (Addition Added)
- Rucker Building – constructed 1904
- Sweet Auburn Curb Market – opened in 1924
- Georgia Insurance Brokerage founded 1970

== Culture ==
Sweet Auburn celebrates the annual Auburn SpringFest, and in the Fall, the Sweet Auburn Heritage Festival. The Sweet Auburn Heritage Festival is an annual festival held the first weekend in October on Auburn Avenue. Civil rights leader Hosea Williams founded the first festival in 1984. Charles Johnson founded the festival in 1994 as a way to celebrate the African American achievements as established on Auburn Avenue. The festival offers food, art, and entertainment throughout the day while celebrating Auburn Avenue's past and growth, and is operated by the Sweet Auburn Committee.

The festival's entertainment varies from comedians to up and coming artists from diverse genres of music. The Sweet Auburn Heritage Festival searches for entertainment from cities such as Atlanta, Macon, Savannah, Augusta, Huntsville and Chattanooga in hopes to help non- established artist's path to stardom. Artist such as Usher Raymond, Outkast, India.Arie, and Raven-Symoné have started out performing on stage at the festival. Ultimately, the Sweet Auburn Heritage Festival entertainment has grown much farther than originally anticipated from its beginning stages in 1984.

Edgewood Avenue which runs through the heart of Sweet Auburn has become a hotspot for viewing for street art in Atlanta. Works by international artists such as Sten Lex and local artists such as Dr. Dax and Chris Veal can be found on Edgewood Avenue and the surrounding streets. Several of the Sweet Auburn murals can be found on the Atlanta Street Art Map.

The neighborhood is home to the Auburn Avenue Research Library on African American Culture and History.

== Gallery ==
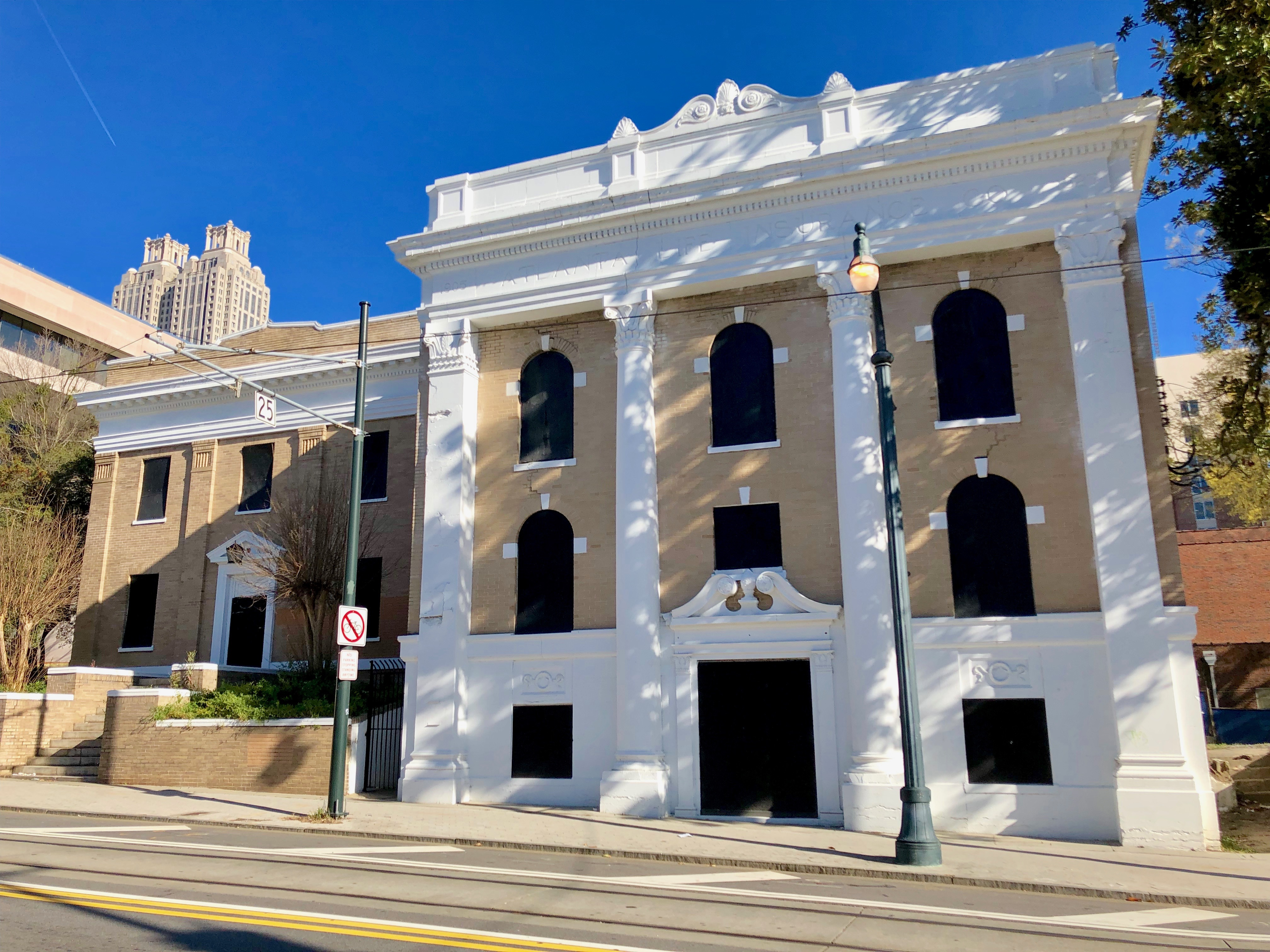
Atlanta Life Insurance Company Building (2019)

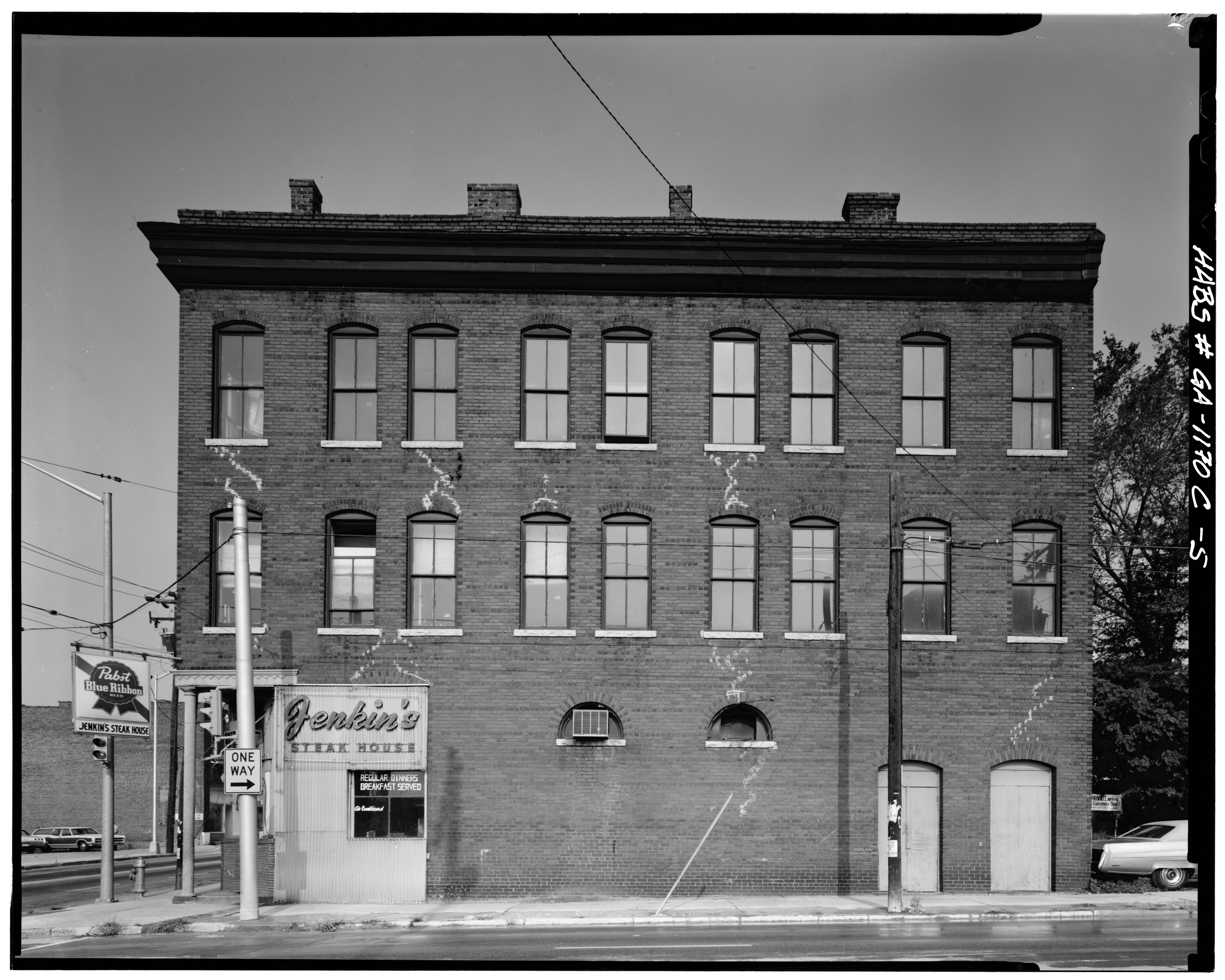
Rucker Building (1979)

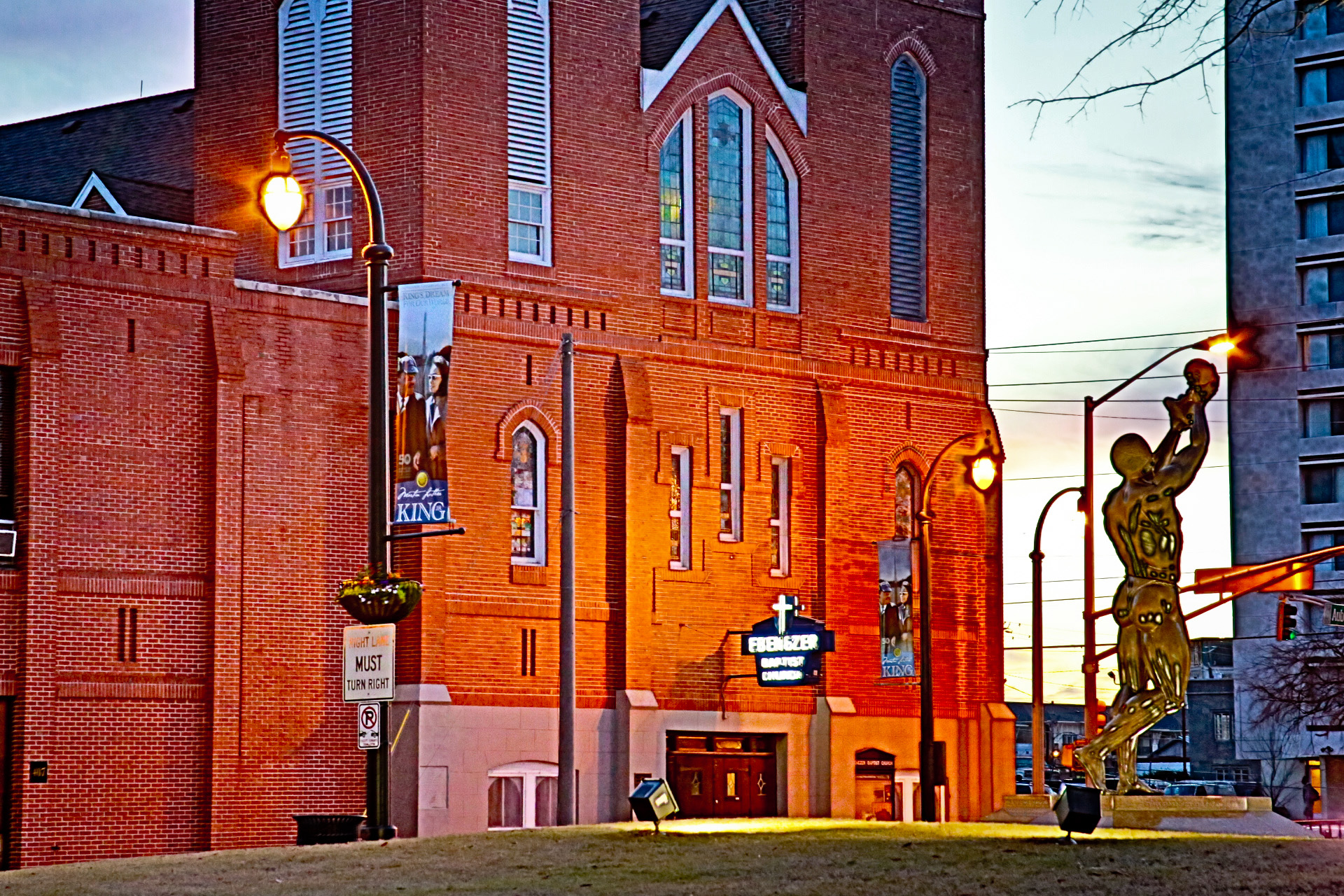
Sunset on Ebenezer Baptist Church (2013)

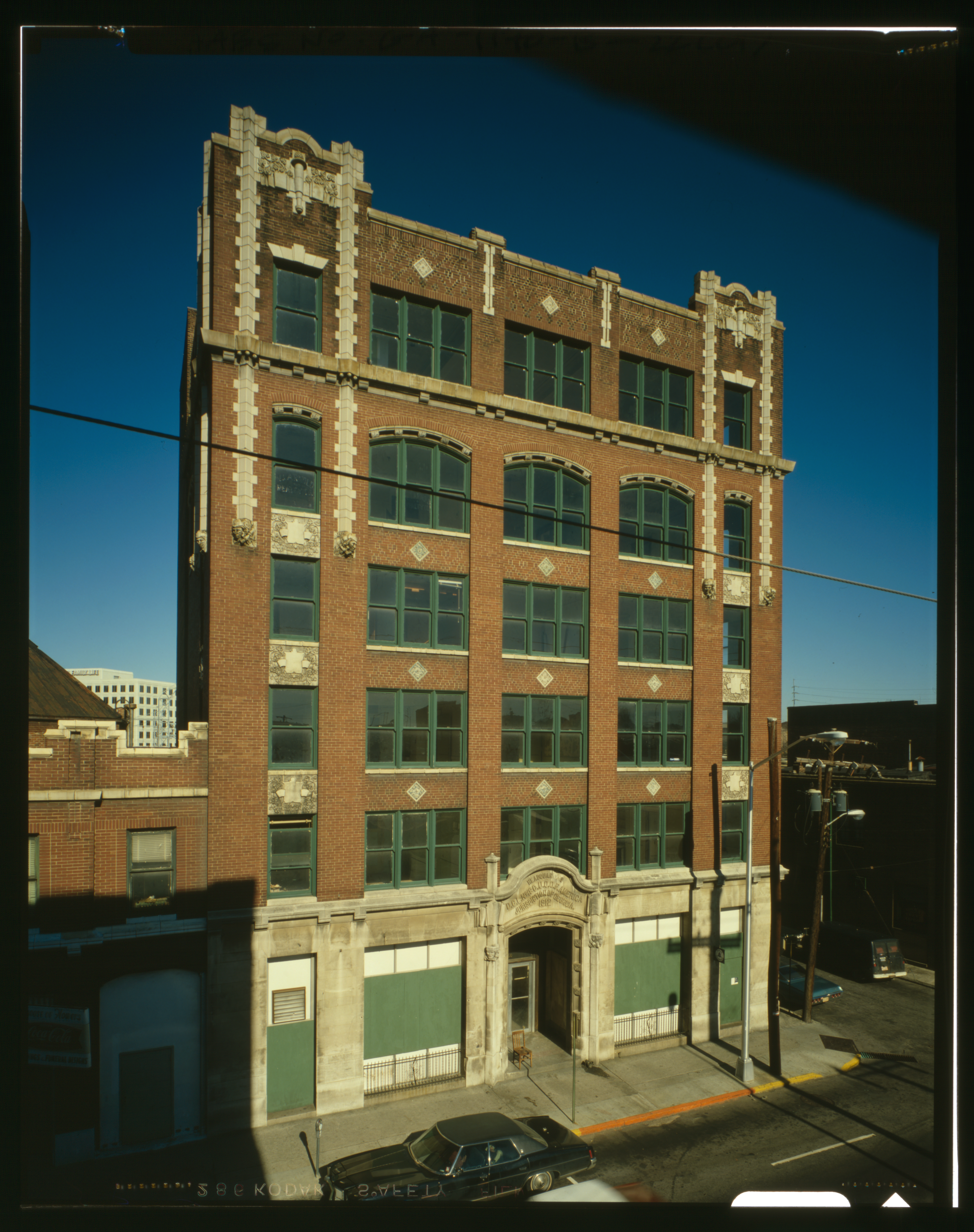
Odd Fellows Building (1979, from Herndon Building)

Adjoining Odd Fellows Auditorium (diagram of street front and rooftop of atrium)

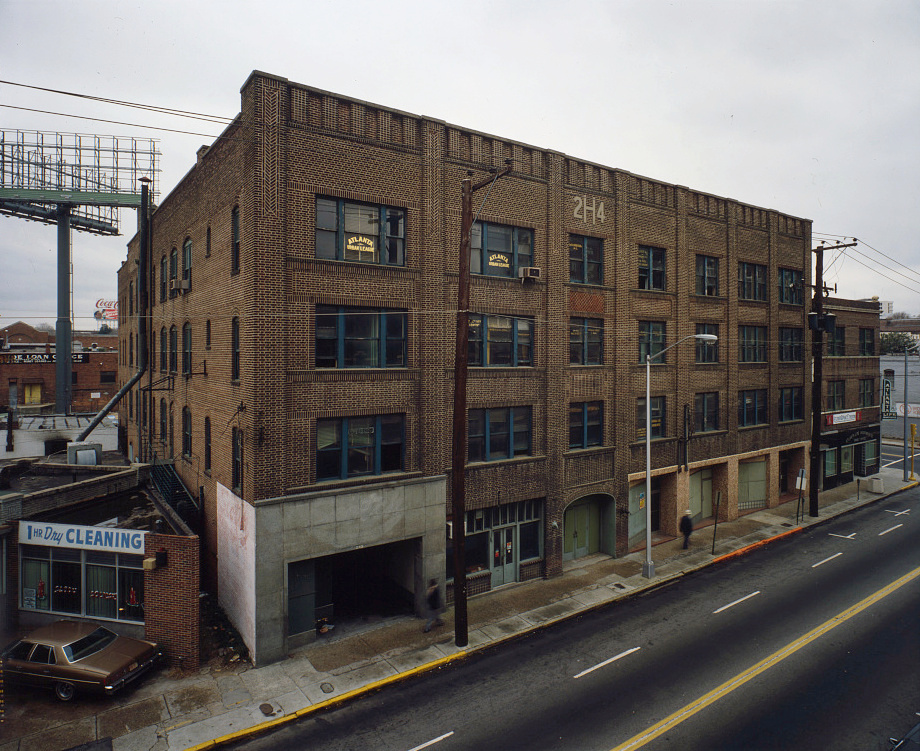
Former Herndon Building (1979, from Odd Fellows Building)

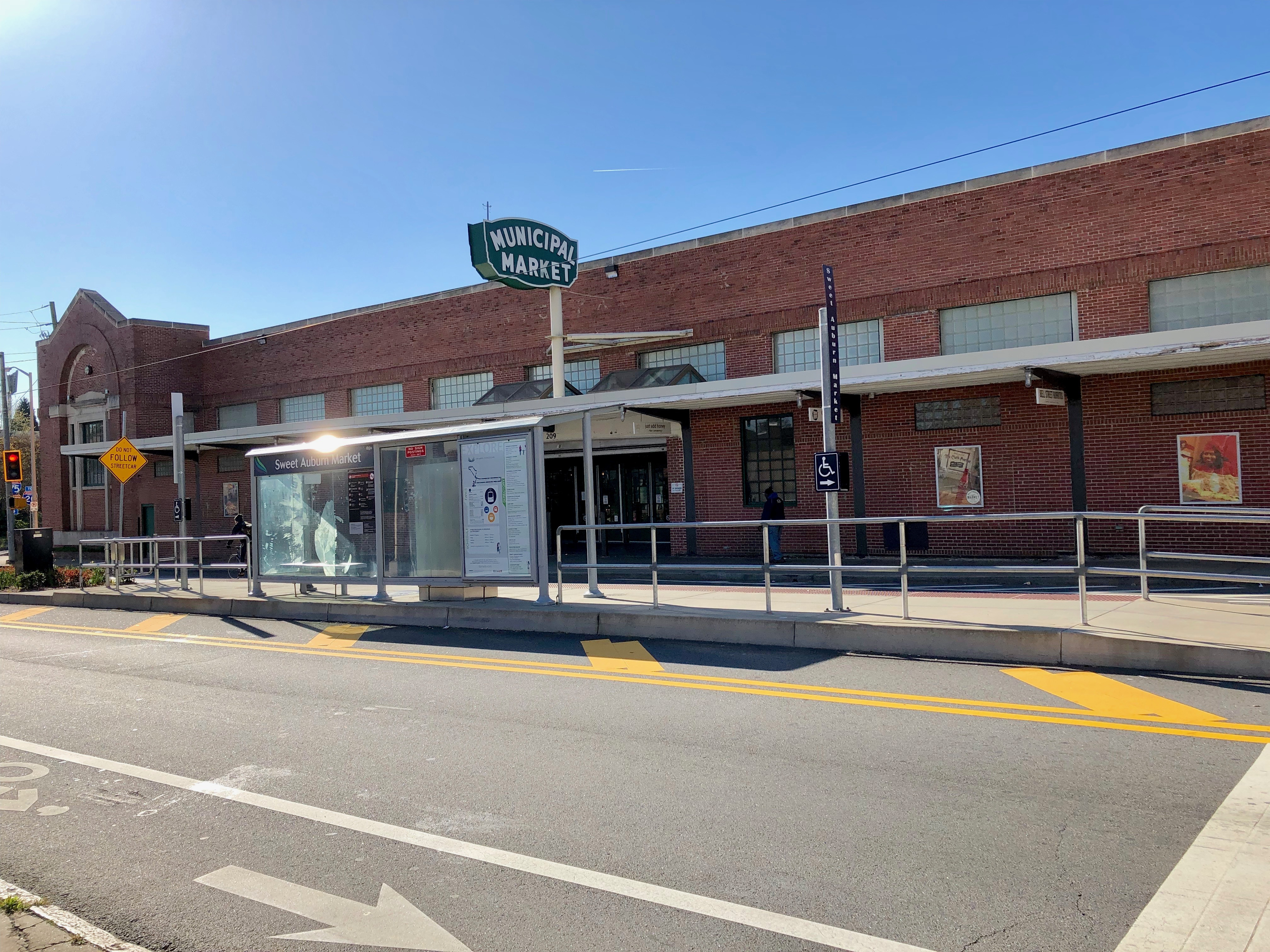
Sweet Auburn Curb Market (2019, with its Atlanta Streetcar stop)

== See also ==
- List of National Historic Landmarks in Georgia (U.S. state)
- National Register of Historic Places listings in Fulton County, Georgia
- African Americans in Atlanta
