= Herndon Stadium =

Stadium in Georgia, United States

Coordinates: 33.756021°N 84.408807°W

Alonzo Herndon Stadium
- Herndon Stadium
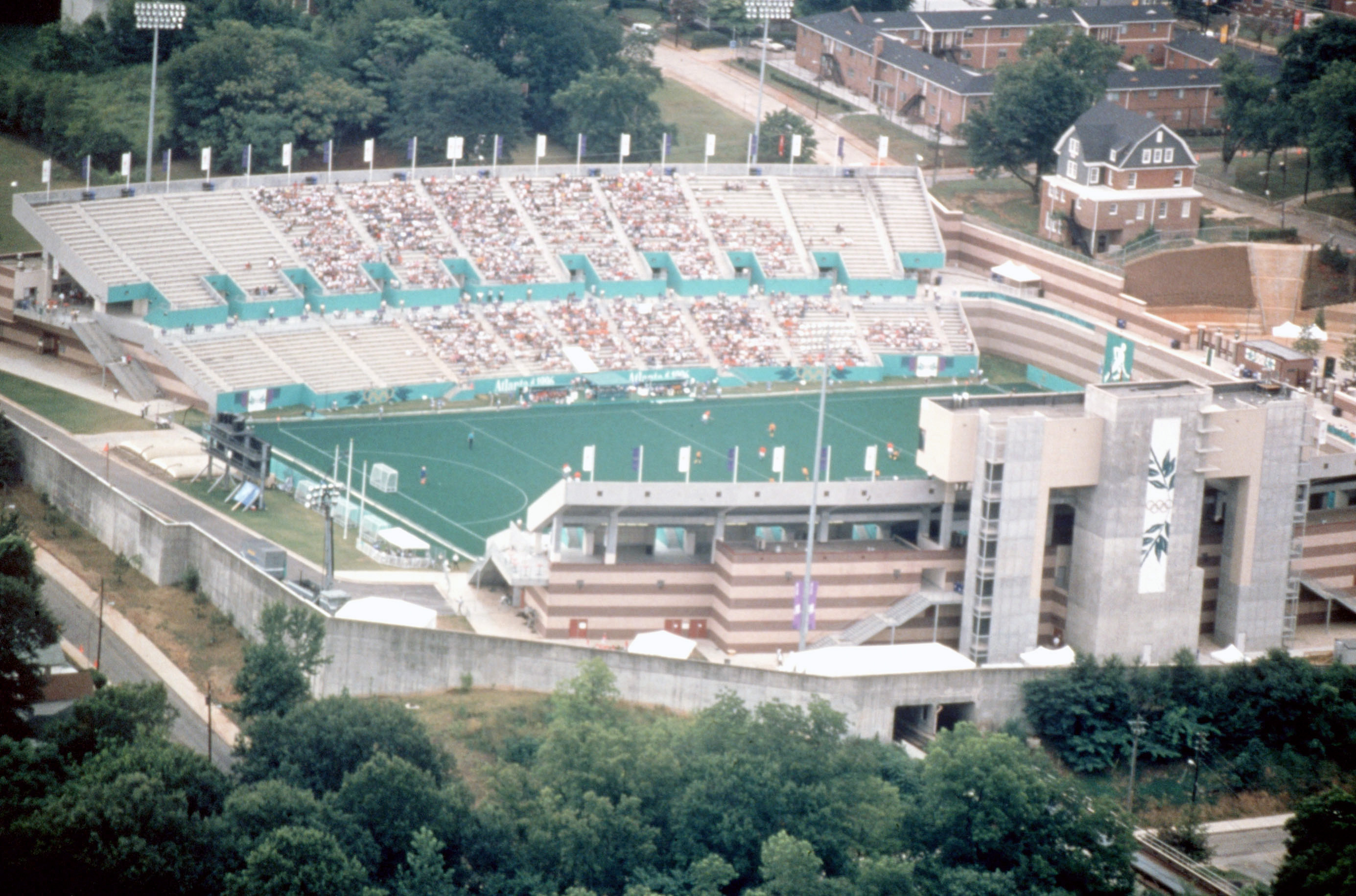
- Interactive map of Alonzo Herndon Stadium
- Full name: Alonzo Herndon Stadium
- Capacity: 15,011
- Field size: 68 yds wide × 110 yds long

Construction
- Built: 1948; 78 years ago
- Opened: 1948

Tenants
- Atlanta Beat (WUSA) 2002–2003; MBC Wolverines

Alonzo Herndon Stadium, named for Alonzo Herndon, is an abandoned 15,011-seat stadium near the campus of Morris Brown College in Atlanta, Georgia, United States. It is the only two-sided stadium in the Atlanta University Center. It is one block over from the locally known Herndon Home, and sits above the MARTA East-West rail line.

== History ==
The stadium opened in 1948. It is the largest stadium at an institution in the Atlanta University Center.

In addition to sports, the stadium hosted concerts. On May 28, 1959, Ray Charles recorded a live album at the stadium and later released it as Ray Charles in Person the following year.

During the 1996 Summer Olympics, Herndon Stadium hosted field hockey. It was expanded and renovated ahead of the games. The stadium was the home to the former Georgia Mustangs and the former Atlanta Beat women's soccer club of the WUSA league, the latter of whom played there from 2001 until 2003.

Due to the college's financial hardships, the stadium was sold to the City of Atlanta in 2014. Due to a land-use agreement with other members of the Atlanta University Center and historic property deeds, ownership of the stadium was given to Clark Atlanta University by court order. The school is planning to restore the stadium.

As of 2026, the stadium sits in a state of disrepair, gutted by vandals and covered in graffiti and litter.

== In popular culture ==
Herndon Stadium was used as the stand-in for the demolished Fairfield Stadium in Huntington, West Virginia, during the filming of the 2006 movie We Are Marshall, and also featured in the 2024 movie Civil War, standing in as a refugee camp.
