= Alonzo Herndon =

American entrepreneur and businessman

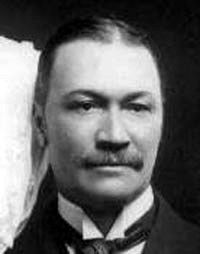
Alonzo Herndon

Alonzo "Lon" Franklin Herndon (June 26, 1858 Walton County, Georgia – July 21, 1927) was an African-American entrepreneur and businessman in Atlanta, Georgia. Born into slavery, he became Atlanta's first Black millionaire by owning and operating three large barber shops in the city that served prominent white men. In 1905 he became the founder and president of what he built to be one of the United States' most well-known and successful African-American businesses, the Atlanta Family Life Insurance Company (Atlanta Life).

== Early life ==
Born into slavery in 1858, in Walton County, Georgia, Alonzo was the son of Sophenie, an enslaved woman, and a white father, likely her enslaver, Frank Herndon, who was from a wealthy slaveholding family. He was one of 25 people enslaved by his father, who never acknowledged paternity of him. In 1865, following the American Civil War, Alonzo, then seven, and his family were emancipated, including his mother, her parents, and his younger brother. He took his presumed father's surname. The family entered freedom in destitution. From a very young age, Herndon worked as a laborer, and a peddler, to help support his family, as only his mother could work in the early years. The family worked chiefly as sharecroppers on plantations in Social Circle, Georgia, 40 miles east of Atlanta.

== Career ==
In 1878, Herndon left Social Circle on foot with eleven dollars in savings and approximately one year of formal schooling. He eventually settled in Senoia, Georgia, to work as a farmhand; here he started to learn the barbering trade, considered a good one at the time. Later, Herndon—known familiarly by the name "Lon"—opened up his first barbershop in Jonesboro, Georgia. His barbering business thrived, and he expanded it over the years. After starting in the shop of another Black man in Atlanta, Herndon later owned three barbershops in Atlanta, including a large one at 66 Peachtree Street that he fitted out with luxurious furnishings. Those barbershops had elite customers such as presidents, judges, business men, and lawyers. One of his large, refined, barbershops serving white customers was damaged by white rioters during the 1906 Atlanta race riot.

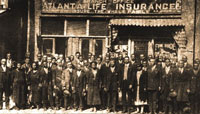
Atlanta Life Insurance in its early days

Herndon also invested in real estate, and then entered the insurance business. He began by buying a failing mutual aid association in 1905, when the state of Georgia increased capital requirements for such businesses. He had been approached by a couple of ministers in the community to acquire the company as something for the Black community. He incorporated it as the Atlanta Mutual Insurance Association. By 1916, the Association was reorganized as a stock company capitalized at $25,000, most of which Herndon bought. In 1922, the company was reorganized as Atlanta Life Insurance Company, and became one of five African-American insurance companies at the time to achieve legal reserve status. Atlanta Life's business thrived, and they expanded their business into Florida, Kansas, Kentucky, Missouri, Tennessee, and Texas.

Through his enterprises, Herndon became Atlanta's first Black millionaire. Herndon was featured in The Crisis Magazine's “Men of the Month” in March 1921, and emphasizes his success as a businessman.

== Personal life and legacy ==
In 1893, Herndon married Adrienne Elizabeth McNeil, a professor at Atlanta University who helped him gain an education and refinement. They had one son together, Norris B. Herndon. After Adrienne died in 1910, Herndon married Jessie Gillespie of Chicago. His son Norris attended Atlanta University and Harvard Business School before entering his father's company full time. Herndon and his family attended the First Congregational Church in Atlanta. It had been closely associated with supporting Clark University and other AMA schools. Herndon died in Atlanta on July 21, 1927, at the age of 69 and was honored by his fraternity, Alpha Phi Alpha. His son, Norris B. Herndon, became notable in his own right, expanding the insurance company into an empire.

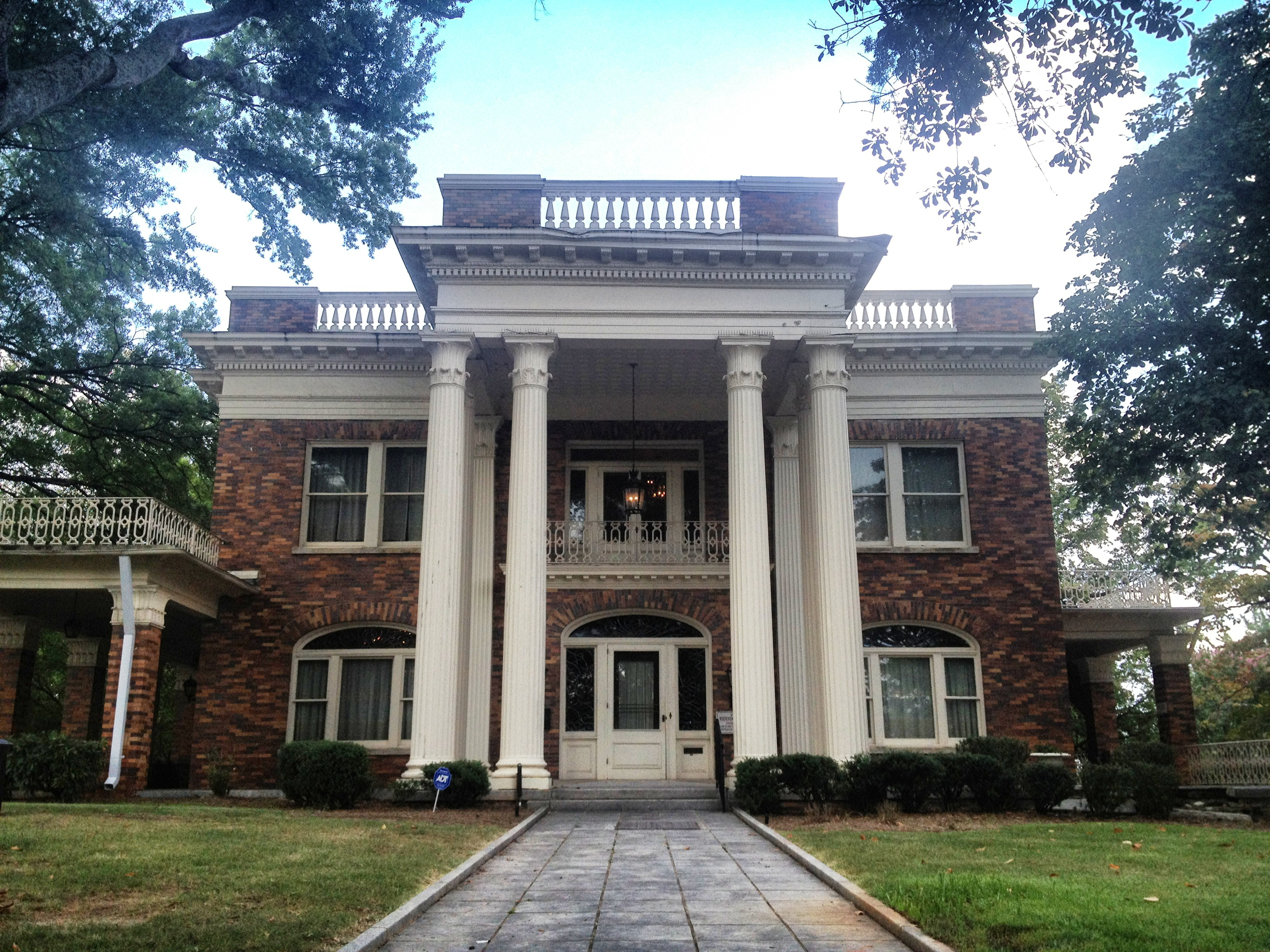
The Herndon Home

- Herndon's former home in Atlanta, Herndon Home, was designated as a U.S. National Historic Landmark in 2000. Built in 1910, the Herndon Home is located at 587 University Place NW in the Vine City neighborhood; it is open for tours to the public on Tuesdays and Thursdays.
- Herndon Homes, a former Atlanta public housing project (now demolished), was named for Herndon.
- Herndon Stadium at Morris Brown College was also named in his honor; it was the field hockey venue at the 1996 Summer Olympics.
