= Atlanta Life =

American financial services company

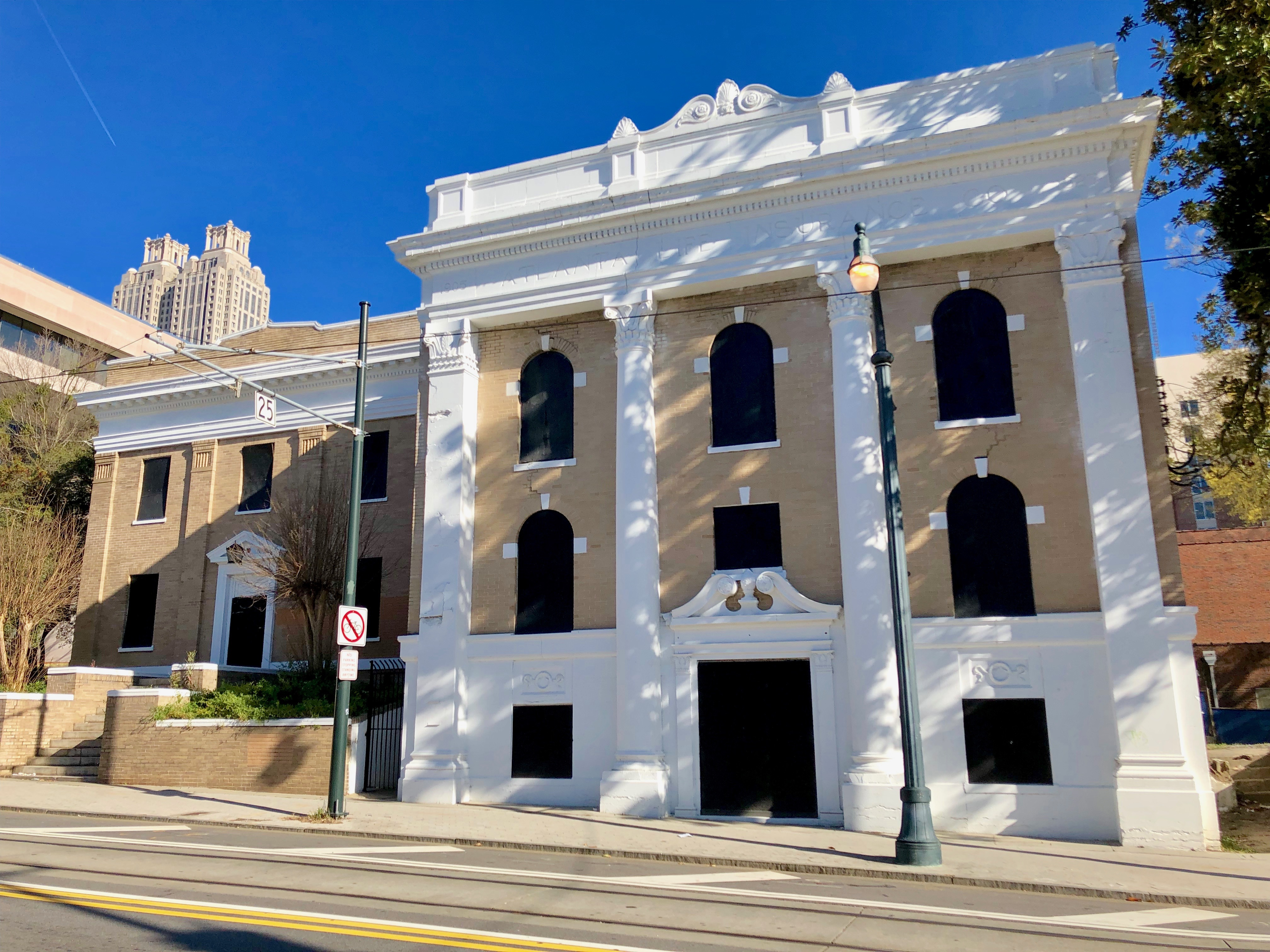
- Atlanta Life Insurance Company Building, Sweet Auburn Historic District
- Predecessor: The Atlanta Benevolent and Protective Association
- Founded: 1922 as Atlanta Life, 1905 as Atlanta Mutual,
- Founder: Alonzo Herndon
- Website: atlantalife.com

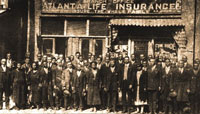
Atlanta Life Insurance in its early days

The Atlanta Life Financial Group is an American financial services company based in Atlanta, Georgia. It was founded in 1905 by Alonzo Herndon as the Atlanta Life Insurance Company. Born into slavery, he started in Atlanta as a young barber, eventually owning three shops. He became Atlanta's richest African American and a highly successful businessman. For many years, the life insurance company was one of the most prominent African-American businesses in the United States. The demolished public housing project Herndon Homes was named for Herndon.

In 1905 Herndon purchased The Atlanta Benevolent and Protective Association (later called Atlanta Mutual) for $140, depositing $5000 (equivalent to $179,000 in 2025) with the state under their requirement for a kind of guarantee fund. In 1922 this was renamed the Atlanta Life Insurance Company. Herndon expanded the company with branches in numerous other Southern states.

The Atlanta Life Insurance Company building (built 1920) at 148 Auburn Avenue, near the corner of Piedmont Avenue, is part of the Martin Luther King Jr. National Historical Park.

== History ==
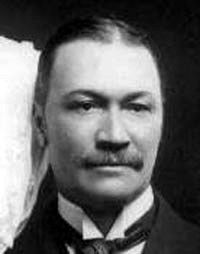
Alonzo Herndon

In 1905, a slave-born barber Alonzo Franklin Herndon founded Atlanta Life Insurance Company. Herndon bought a small self-help association known as the Atlanta Benevolent and Protective Association for $140, which Reverend Peter Bryant of Wheat Street Baptist Church had established the year before. Herndon then consolidated his investments into the Atlanta Mutual Insurance Association, adding two other firms, the Royal Mutual Insurance Company, and the National Laborer's Protective Union.

In 2008, William A. Clement, Jr. was appointed as President & CEO of the Atlanta Life Financial Group, Inc., and served for three years in that capacity. He was also an outside director of ALFG in 1992, and in 2001.

In 2014, Atlanta Life Financial Group's Board of Directors appointed Roosevelt Giles as Chairman and William J. Stanley III, as Vice Chairman.
