= Olympic Legacy Program =

Housing initiative in Atlanta, United States

The Olympic Legacy Program was an initiative taken in effort to revitalize many of Atlanta’s public housing projects in the early 1990s in preparation for hosting the 1996 Olympic Games. The initiative, guided by the principals of “new urbanism” was proposed as a way to transform thirteen former projects scattered throughout the city. The initiative began with Techwood Homes in downtown Atlanta, Clark Howell Homes, and continuing to several other projects in each zone. The program was led by former Atlanta Housing Authority (AHA) CEO Renee Glover. While the project's ultimate effect was to reduce the concentration of poverty in the city, and improve neighborhoods, employment and education opportunities, finding housing for some of the poor shifted to suburban housing which lacked many of the social services of government housing.

== History ==
The first public housing project to receive attention under this program was the Techwood Homes in downtown Atlanta. Techwood Homes, located next to the Georgia Institute of Technology, was the first public housing project that came as a result of President Franklin D. Roosevelt's National Housing Act. At the time of its construction, Techwood Homes was a white-family only housing project. When Atlanta's public housing finally integrated, years after President John F. Kennedy's desegregation order, Techwood became 50% African American within five years, and this percentage rose as the white families previously living there moved out in following years. While opening thousands of living units across the city, a majority of these projects were given little to no attention and soon became dangerous slum areas.

== Process ==
After the city was chosen to host the 1996 Summer Olympics, Atlanta's officials were encouraged to revitalize the city that would soon be the focus of millions of viewers worldwide, giving birth to the Olympic Legacy Program. Officials complained that the projects put too much poverty in one place. At this time, the first HUD's HOPE VI grant was given to the Atlanta Housing Authority (AHA) which was intended to replace older public housing projects to provide residents of these projects with help to achieve economic self-sufficiency. The AHA, led by chief executive officer Renee Glover, wanted to take this and start over with a new approach: the privatization of Atlanta's nearly 50-year-old public housing through a process of demolition and reconstruction. The neighborhoods that had organized to resist the destruction of the projects relented as a result of the campaign to prepare Atlanta for hosting the Games. In theory, market-rate units would bring private investment to the neighborhood that the public housing project lacked. Families in the subsidized housing units at the development would get to benefit from the newcomers, and the resulting Mixed income communities would thrive. Nevertheless, after the demolition, until new housing was built, people who were displaced (if they received assistance at all) moved elsewhere in Atlanta or to the suburbs. In the case of the residents displaced from Techwood/Clark Howell, the process involved turning attention to residents who were late on rent, allowed others to stay with them, or convicted felons. Techwood Homes, renamed to Centennial Place after its reconstruction, was the first project in Atlanta to experience this rapid gentrification.

MIT professor of urban planning Lawrence Vale said “the message is that Atlanta’s city officials transformed these people by fixing their neighborhood and their home… But the missing piece of that is that it's not the same people.”

== Results ==
The results of the Olympic Legacy Program reveal the lack of sustainability precautions taken- most apparent in income changes and population densities. The Centennial area now is a large tourist attraction with luxury family apartment style living. The median income in Techwood prior to redevelopment was $3,219 per year. Income limits have been increased to $34,000 for a household with two people and to $38,250 for a household with three occupants. With the privatization of the new units, rents increased which drew in even more investment as a positive feedback loop. Techwood/Clark Howell Housing Community included 1,195 units before the Olympics; after the Olympics the new Centennial Place Apartments (formerly Techwood Homes) with 360 subsidized units (30% for former income-level, not former residents) under private management. East Lake Meadows with 650 units and became The Villages at East Lake, with only 270 units rented to very low income households. After the Olympics: Carver Homes would become the Villages at Carver and would lose 700 units. Grady Homes – all 495 units destroyed in 2006, with plans for 615 new units, only 222 of which will be designated for “poor” residents. Capitol Homes is gone completely, with a loss of 368 units. The population of public housing residents was reduced in each instance as the projects were replaced with mixed-income housing at lower densities.

Other results of the Olympic Legacy Program were replacement of aged, badly performing schools, increased employment and employment training, increased surrounding property values, construction of community centers, private investment in surrounding commercial and residential projects including grocery, banking and retail redevelopments, and reduced crime.

In a report by Harvey K. Newman it was found that some cities, such as Milwaukee and El Paso, had a different experience with the HOPE VI program than Atlanta. These cities experienced less conflict between residents and local housing officials in their use of HOPE VI grants. Two factors contributed to this lower level of conflict: that the grants were used to rehabilitate projects rather than demolition and replacement, and that these cities seem to have had more extensive resident involvement in the planning and implementation of the HOPE VI programs.
