= Lakewood Heights, Atlanta =

Coordinates: 33.704246°N 84.386413°W

Lakewood Heights
- Neighborhoods of Atlanta
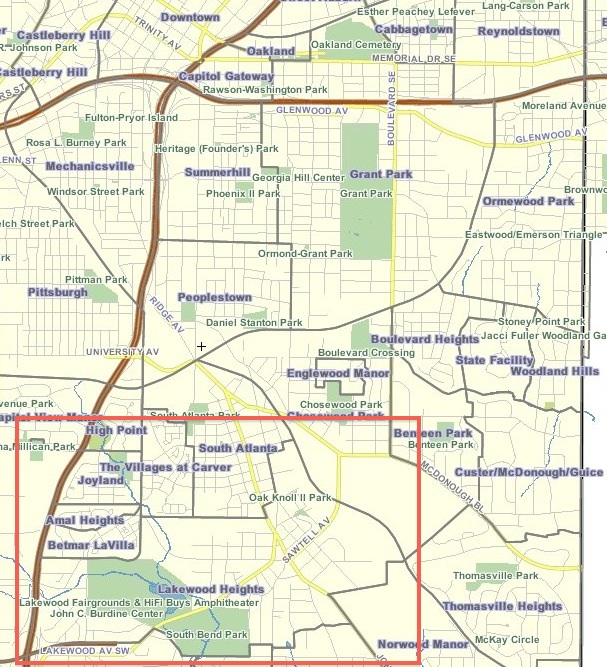
- location of Lakewood Heights in southeast Atlanta
- Country: United States
- State: Georgia
- County: Fulton County
- City: City of Atlanta
- NPU: Y

Population (2008)
  - Total: 2,750

- Lakewood Heights Historic District
- U.S. National Register of Historic Places
- U.S. Historic district
- Location within Atlanta Location within Georgia Location within the United States
- Location: jct. of Jonesboro Rd. and Lakewood Ave., Atlanta, Georgia
- Area: 219 acres (89 ha)
- Built: 1895
- Architect: William Augustus Edwards, William J. Sayward
- Architectural style: Colonial Revival
- NRHP reference No.: 02000712
- Added to NRHP: July 5, 2002

Lakewood Heights is a historic neighborhood established in the late 19th century. It experienced significant growth in the 1920s and 1930s as both an industrial and residential area. Originally, it was a predominantly Jewish working-class community but gradually changed to a predominantly African American working-class community. However, as of the 2010s, the neighborhood is again undergoing notable changes. Gentrification has increased diversity and rising demand have positively transformed the area, driven by new developments along the nearby Atlanta Beltline and Downtown Atlanta. For many years before this revitalization, Lakewood Heights struggled with high vacancy rates and low home sales. It is bounded by:

- the Betmar LaVilla, the Villages at Carver, and South Atlanta neighborhoods on the north,
- the Chosewood Park neighborhood on the northeast,
- the Norwood Manor neighborhood on the southeast,
- the Polar Rock, Swallow Circle/Baywood and Lakewood neighborhoods on the south
- the Downtown Connector on the west, across which lie the Sylvan Hills and Capitol View Homes neighborhoods

Lakewood Heights contains the Lakewood Heights Historic District, listed on the National Register of Historic Places.

== History ==
=== Factors leading to development ===
Lakewood Heights developed as the result of three separate factors:

- The streetcar line along Jonesboro Road, which enabled commercial and residential development along the corridor
- Parallel to that, development of an industrial area including the General Motors Lakewood Assembly plant
- Development of a black neighborhood around the Gammon Theological Seminary and Clark University, now the site of The New Schools at Carver high school
- Development of the Southeast Regional Fairgrounds on the site of the city's first waterworks plant along Lakewood Avenue—streetcar access from Downtown Atlanta enabled subsequent development of public and private housing projects along Pryor Road, then a major artery to and from downtown

=== Private enterprise and model homes ===
One section of Lakewood Heights is Oak Knoll, which was noted in a 1937 meeting between Techwood Homes organizer Charles Forrest Palmer, President Franklin Delano Roosevelt, first lady Eleanor Roosevelt and Secretary of the Treasury Henry Morgenthau Jr. Roosevelt was delighted that private enterprise—backed by guarantees the Federal Housing Administration—could provide good homes at moderate rentals. The conversation about Oak Knoll drew the conclusion that private projects were in fact strengthened by public housing projects serving as a "pace setter", and helped support arguments for a more proactive nationwide public housing policy. The house at 1099 Oak Knoll Drive was featured in a 1938 issue of Life magazine, as it was a Life "model house"; the model kits were available for purchase from retailers around the country.

=== Assembly plant to media productions ===
The neighborhood was home to the Lakewood Fairgrounds which until 1979 had a racetrack, Lakewood Speedway. Now the Cellairis Amphitheatre at Lakewood is located on the old fairgrounds.

Around 1970 the area began to decline as middle-class families moved away because blue-collar jobs in the neighborhood were slowly disappearing. The assembly plant finally closed in 1990.

The area is now an important center of the growing Atlanta-area film and television production industry. The Cinespace Film Studios Atlanta soundstages were established there in mid-2010 and by Autumn 2011 were already expanding.

== Parks ==
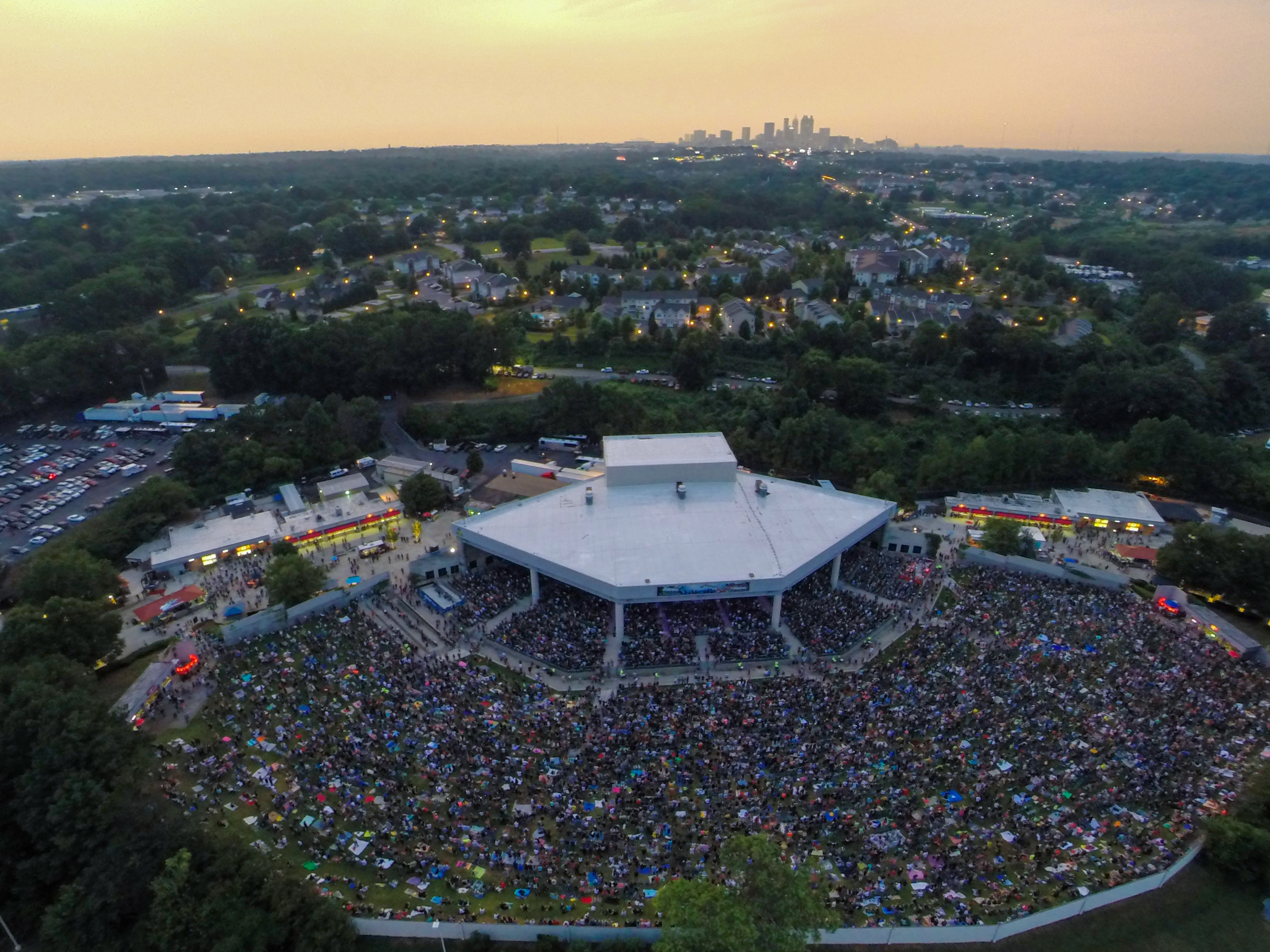
Cellairis Amphitheatre at Lakewood

- Cellairis Amphitheatre at Lakewood
- South Bend Park (76.6 acres)
- John C. Burdine Center (4.27 acres)
- Oak Knoll Parks 1 and 2
- South View Cemetery Association
- Swann Nature Preserve

== Gallery ==
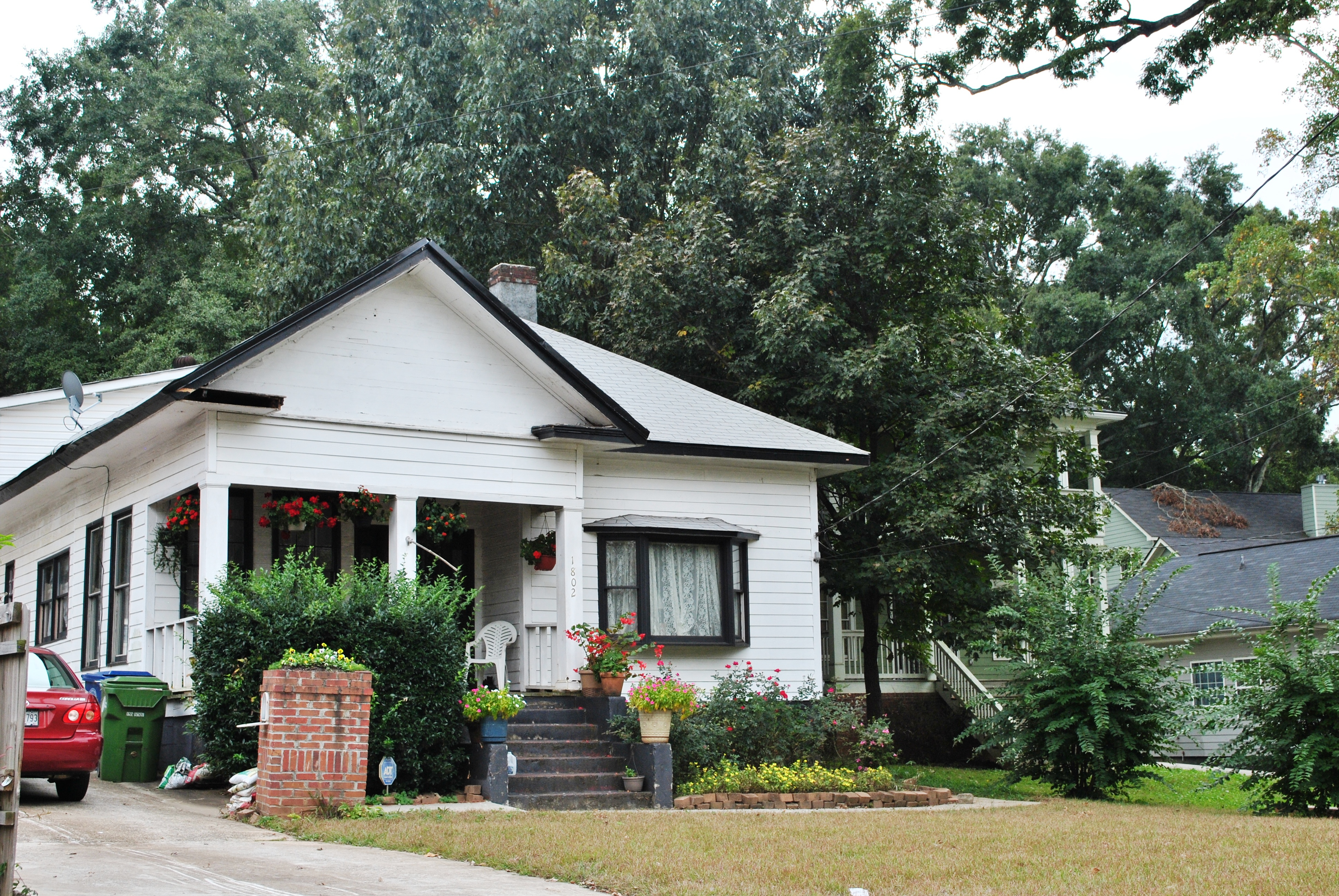
Lakewood Heights Historic District

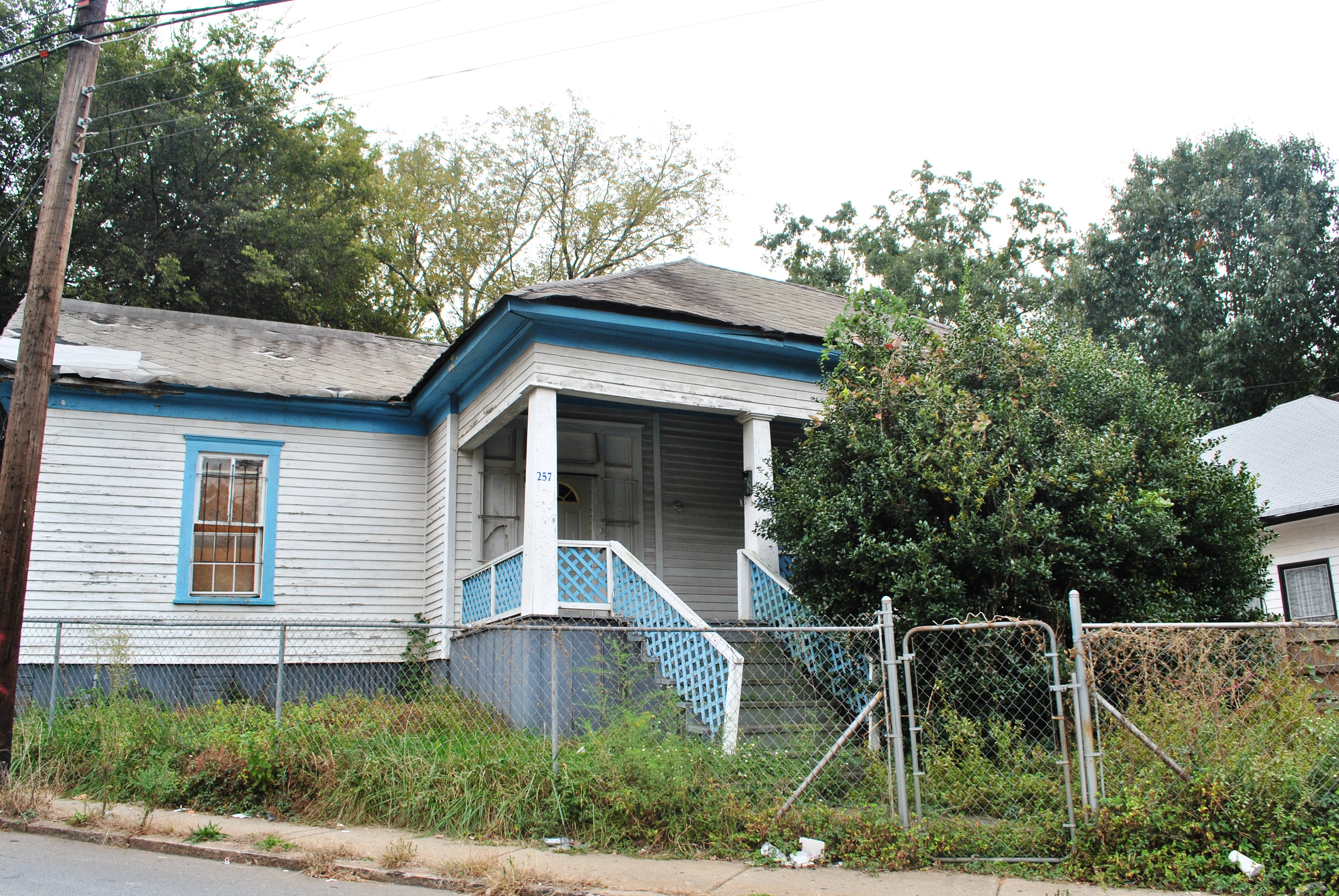
Lakewood Heights Historic District

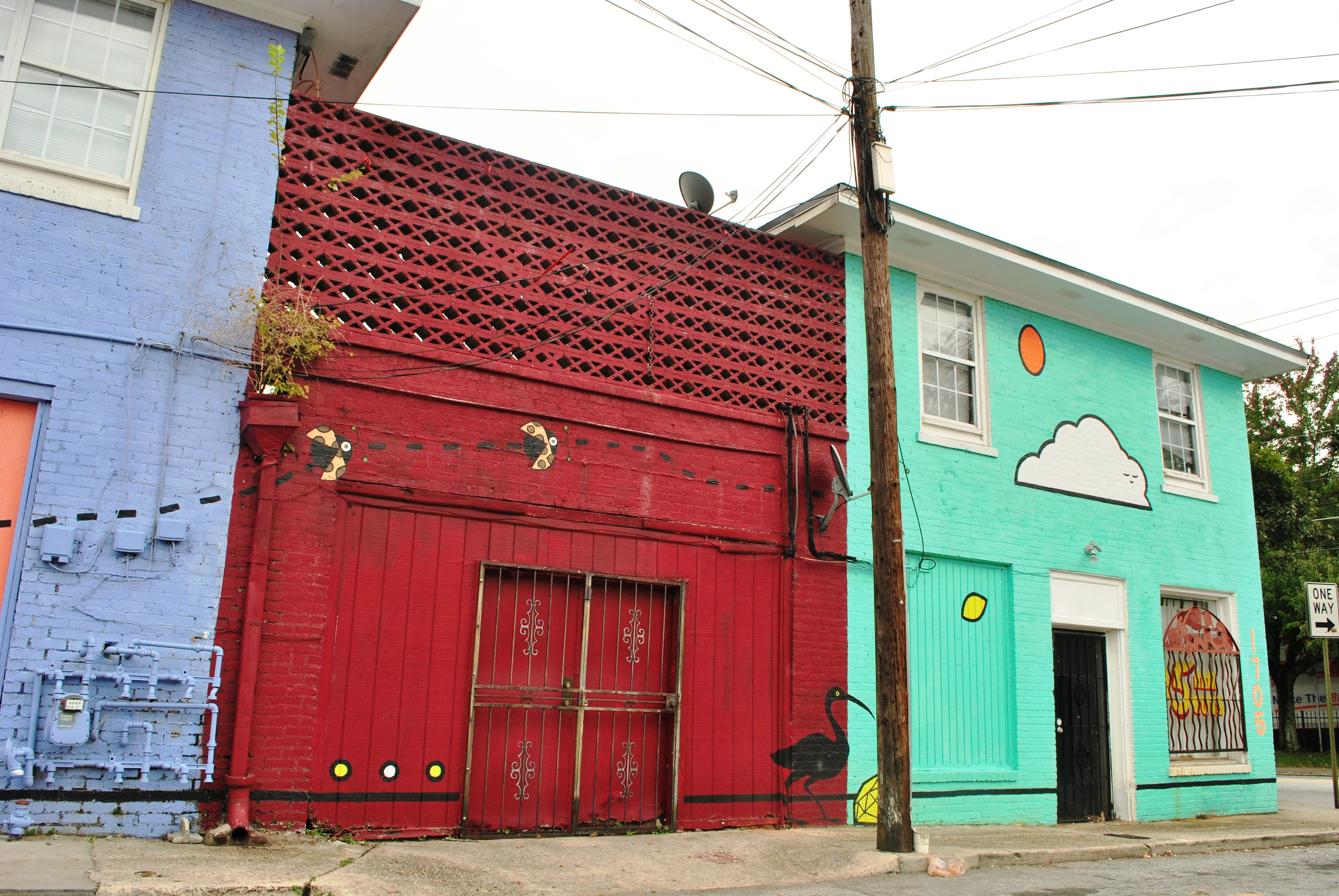
Lakewood Heights Historic District

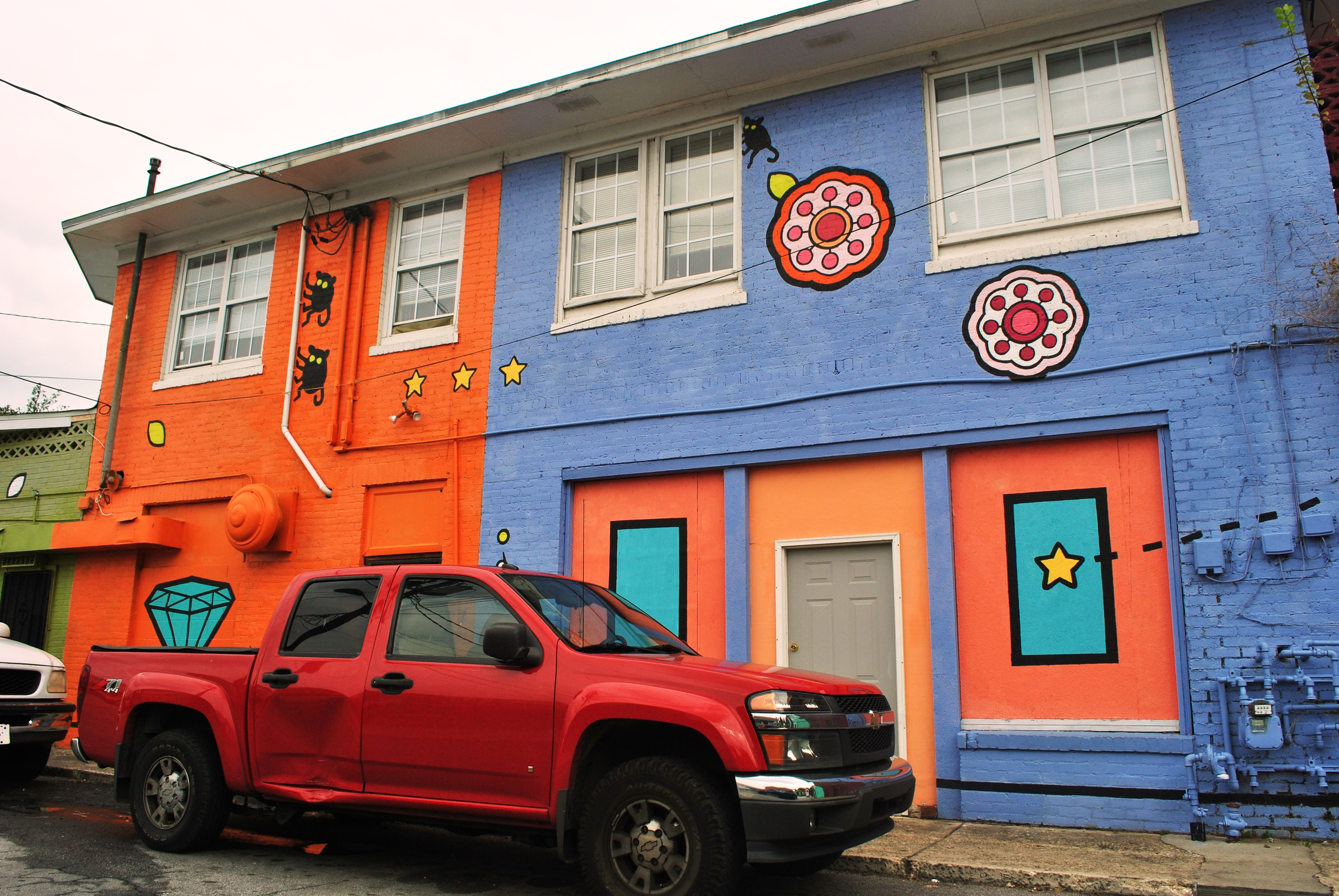
Lakewood Heights Historic District

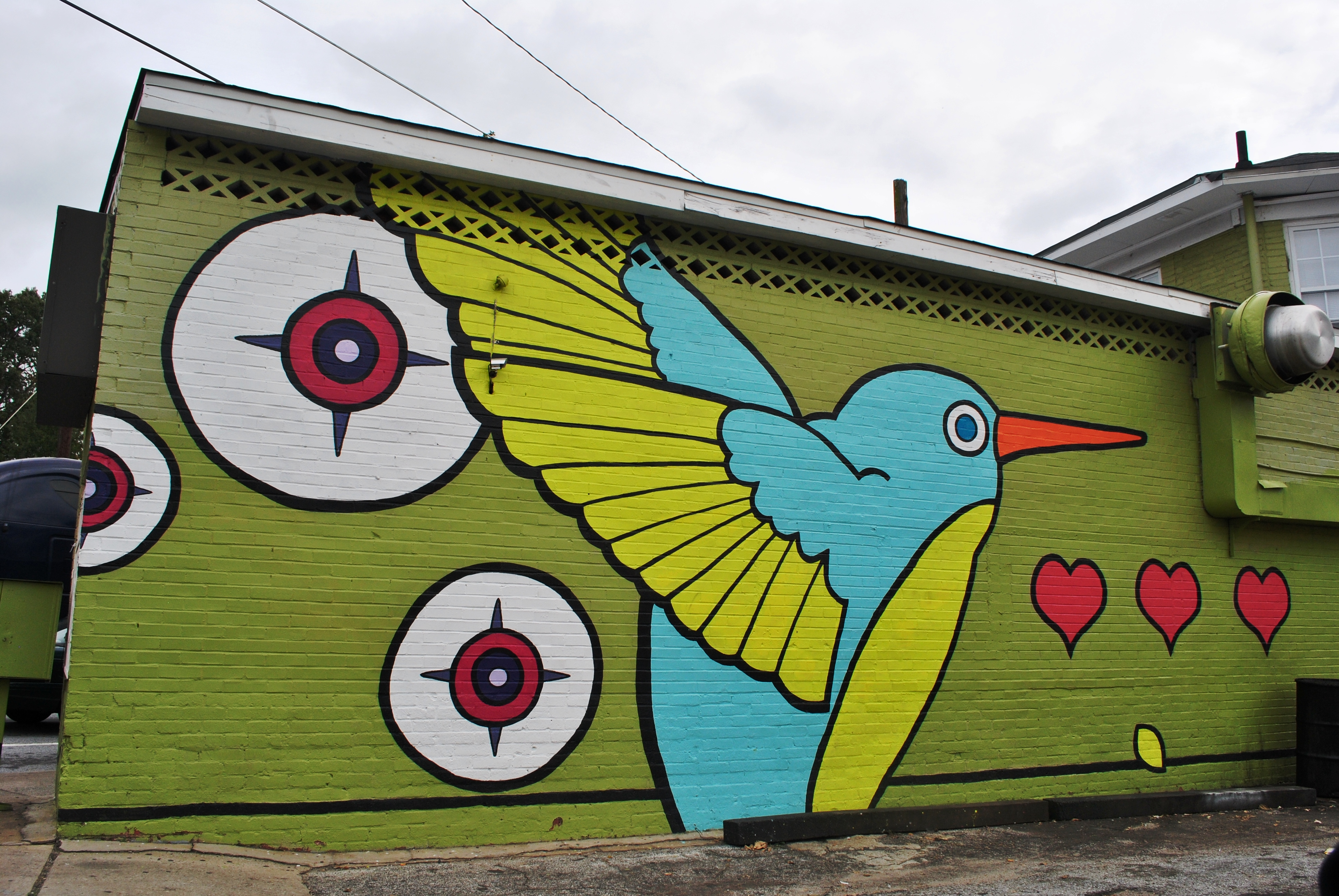
Lakewood Heights Historic District

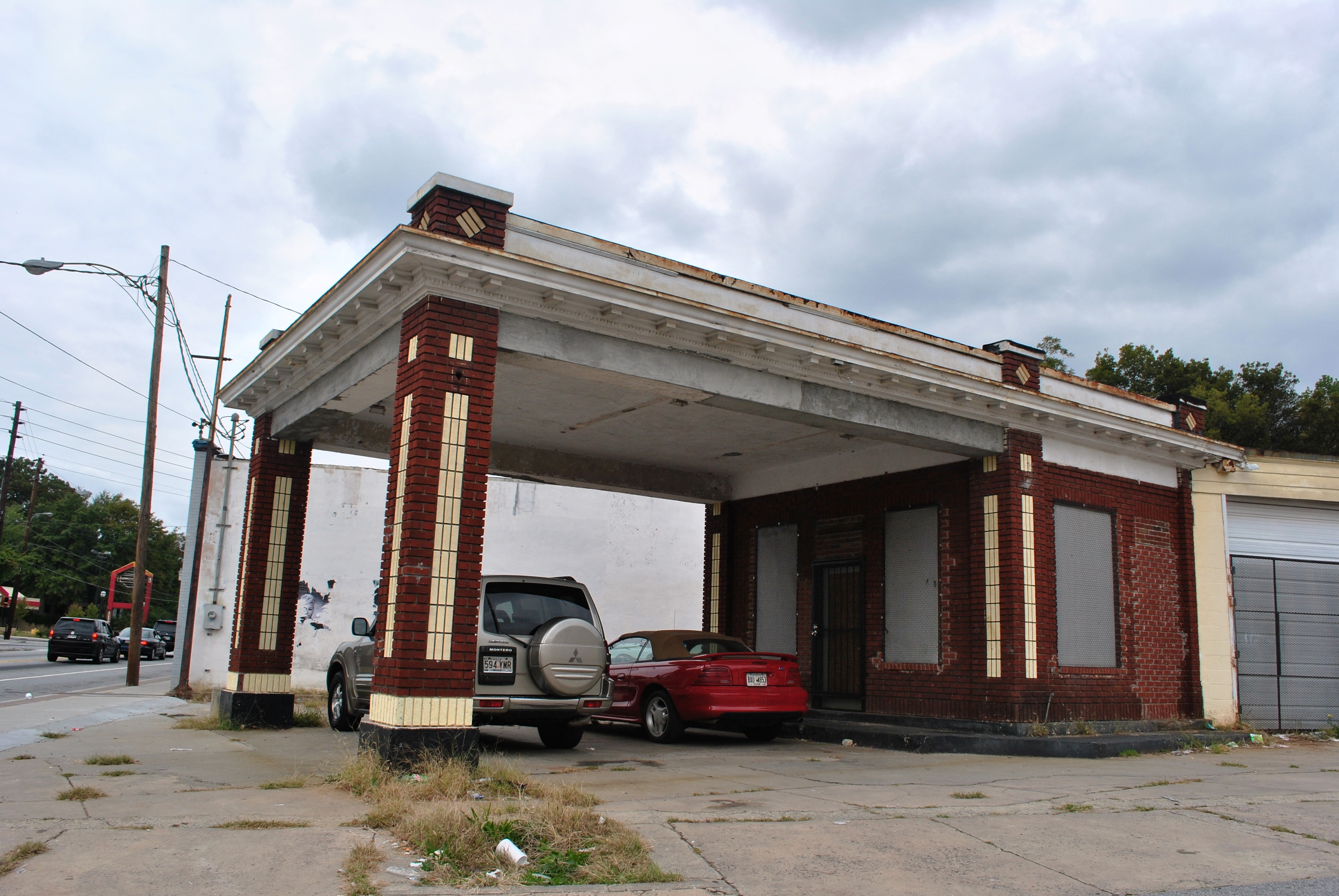
Lakewood Heights Historic District

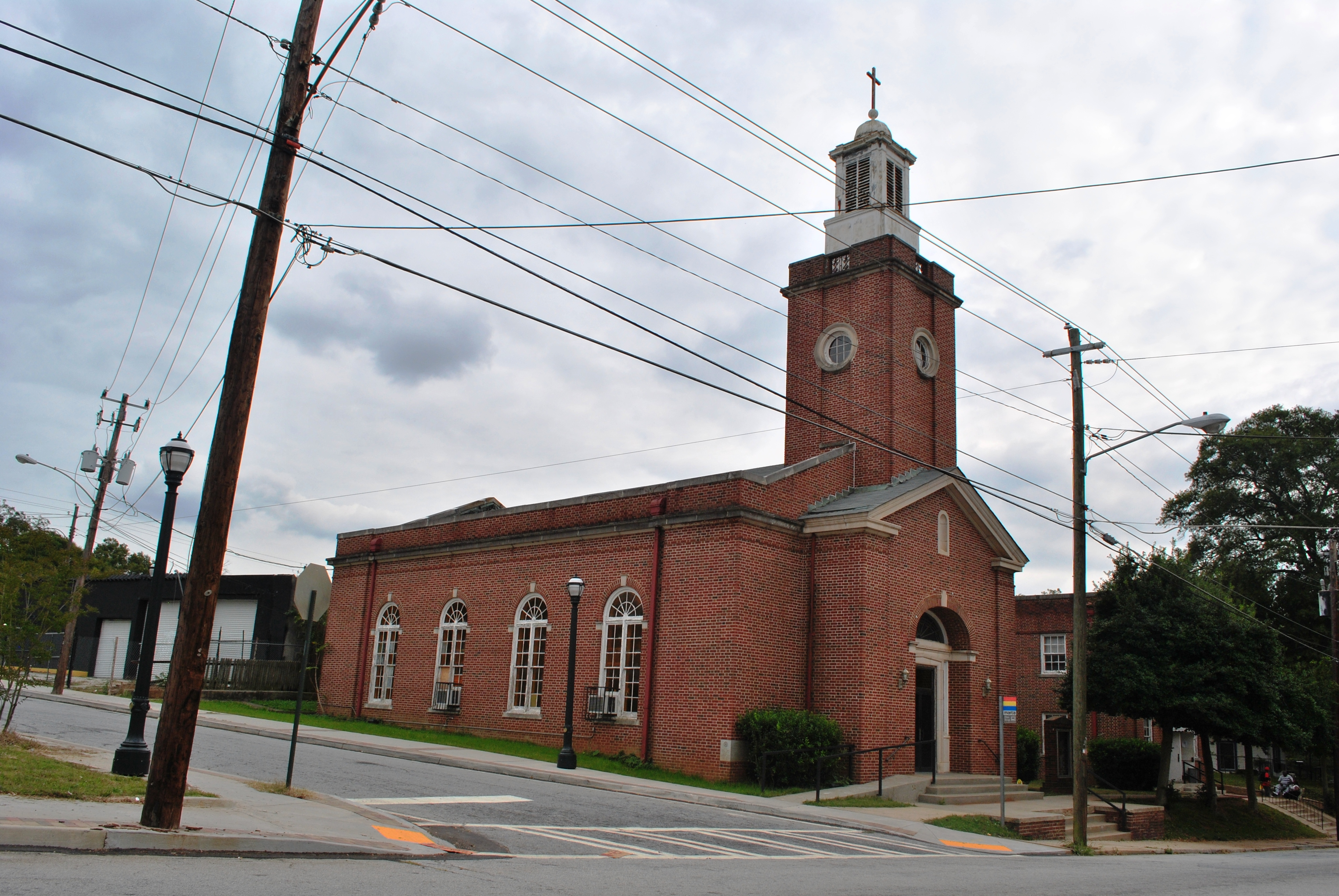
Lakewood Heights Historic District

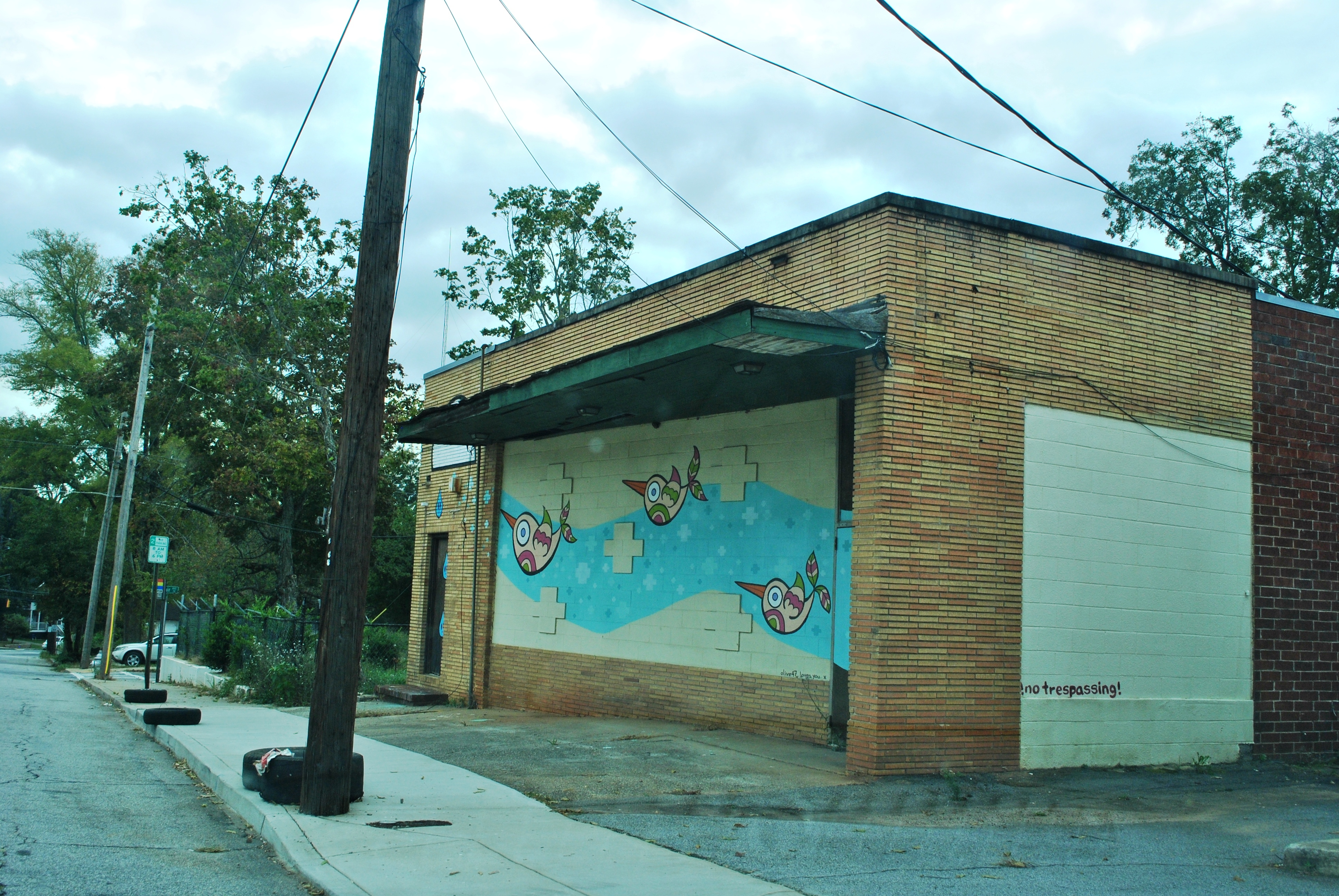
Lakewood Heights Historic District

== See also ==
- Lakewood Fairgrounds
- Lakewood Assembly (GM plant)
