= Atlanta Housing Authority =

Government agency that provides affordable housing in Atlanta, Georgia, U.S.

Atlanta Housing Authority (AHA)

Agency overview
- Formed: 1938
- Preceding agency: Public Works Administration
- Jurisdiction: Atlanta
- Headquarters: 230 John Wesley Dobbs Avenue, Atlanta, Georgia
- Employees: 311
- Annual budget: $242 Million (2018)
- Agency executive: Eugene Jones, President and CEO
- Parent agency: Housing and Urban Development
- Website: atlantahousing.org

The Atlanta Housing Authority (AHA) is an agency that provides affordable housing for low-income families in Atlanta. Today, the AHA is the largest housing agency in Georgia and one of the largest in the United States, serving approximately 50,000 people.

The AHA was founded in 1938, taking over from the Public Works Administration (PWA). Due to the lobbying of Charles Palmer, an Atlantan real estate developer, Atlanta had been the site of Techwood Homes, the first public housing project in the country in 1936. Early public housing projects such as Techwood and its sister project, University Homes, were built for working-class families on the sites of former slums. Charles Palmer became the AHA's first chairperson, and under him and his successors, the agency continued to clear slums and build public housing complexes. The first phase of construction lasted from 1938 to 1941, and was financed with funds from the Wagner-Steagall Act. The second phase was from 1951 to 1956, using grants funded by the Housing Act of 1949. The final phase took place from 1962 to 1973, with only a few smaller projects completed after that date. During the 70s and 80s, the AHA came under increasing criticism, such as from local newspaper The Great Speckled Bird, over its management of its complexes, as violence and physical deterioration began to grow. When Atlanta won its bid to host the 1996 Olympics, city leaders worried that the public housing complexes would be an international embarrassment. Under chairperson Renee Glover, the AHA won Federal HOPE VI funding to tear down many of the public housing complexes, including Techwood. After the Olympics, the campaign to tear down Atlanta's public housing continued, and by 2011 all traditional-style units were torn down or sold to private entities. The AHA now provides six primary housing services, most prominently housing vouchers and mixed-income developments.

== History ==
=== Background ===
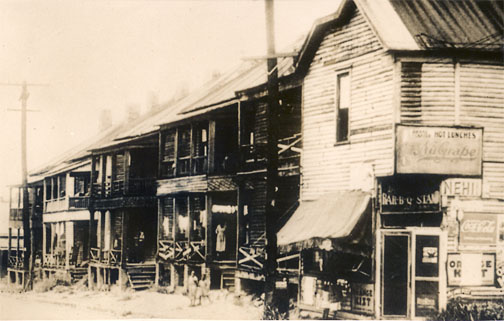
Housing for the poor in early 20th century Atlanta: Tanyard Bottom a.k.a. Tech Flats, site of Centennial Place today

The movement to construct public housing in Atlanta began during the early 1930s. Charles Palmer, a conservative real estate developer, became concerned with the threat to property values posed by shantytowns so close to downtown. Similar concerns were being expressed among the Black elite, who disliked the physical proximity of Atlanta University to the slum known as Beaver Slide. Palmer embarked on several tours of European countries to examine their public housing programs, and heavily lobbied the federal government to begin constructing public housing in the United States. Despite his opposition to the election of Franklin D. Roosevelt (FDR), it was only with the creation of the Public Works Administration (PWA) in 1933 that Palmer was able to win approval for a public housing project, to be built in Techwood Flats.

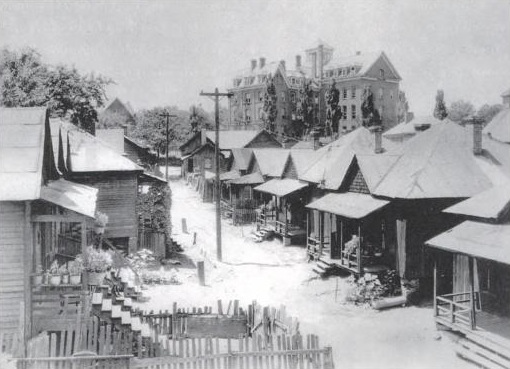
Housing for the poor in early 20th century Atlanta: Beaver Slide near Atlanta University

Techwood Flats was a mixed-race community located between Georgia Tech and downtown Atlanta, with buildings that often lacked running water or electricity. Charles Palmer claimed that he selected Techwood Flats specifically because it lay on his commute from northwest Atlanta into downtown. At this point in time, slum clearance was seen as necessarily tied with public housing, despite the fact that public housing was not intended for habitation by the poor. Rather, public housing was meant to be a temporary aid to middle- or working-class families hurt by the Great Depression. Thus, when the Techwood Homes public housing project was completed in 1936, few residents of the former slum were able to move back in. Furthermore, the old community had been racially mixed, whereas the new public housing project was all white. This set a precedent of public housing in Atlanta being used to shape the racial and economic composition of communities in areas of interest to the elite.

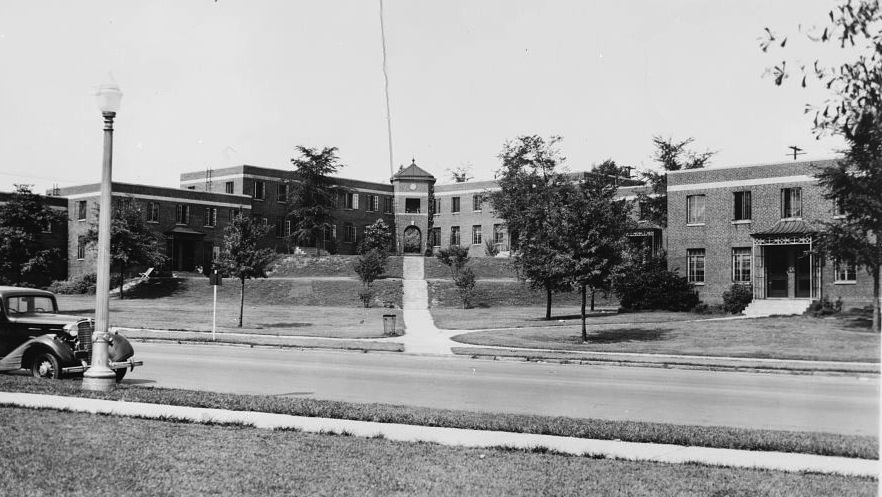
Techwood Homes, late 1930s

Not only was Techwood Homes the first public housing project in Atlanta, it was also the first permanent public housing project in the United States. It received recognition across the country, and in 1935 FDR gave a speech to dedicate the project. Following Techwood Homes, Atlanta's second housing project would be University Homes, intended for African-Americans and built over the demolished Beaver Slide. Even more so than with Techwood, this population of this project represented a sharp increase in income for the area. While the previous community was made of mostly unskilled laborers, University Homes was home to the Black middle class, or even the upper middle class. While touted by John Hope (President of Atlanta University) and other Black elites as a victory for the Black community, it was emblematic of the desire of those same elites to separate themselves from the Black poor. It also represented part of the serious disconnect between the goals of the Black elites and middle class and the interests of the Black poor.

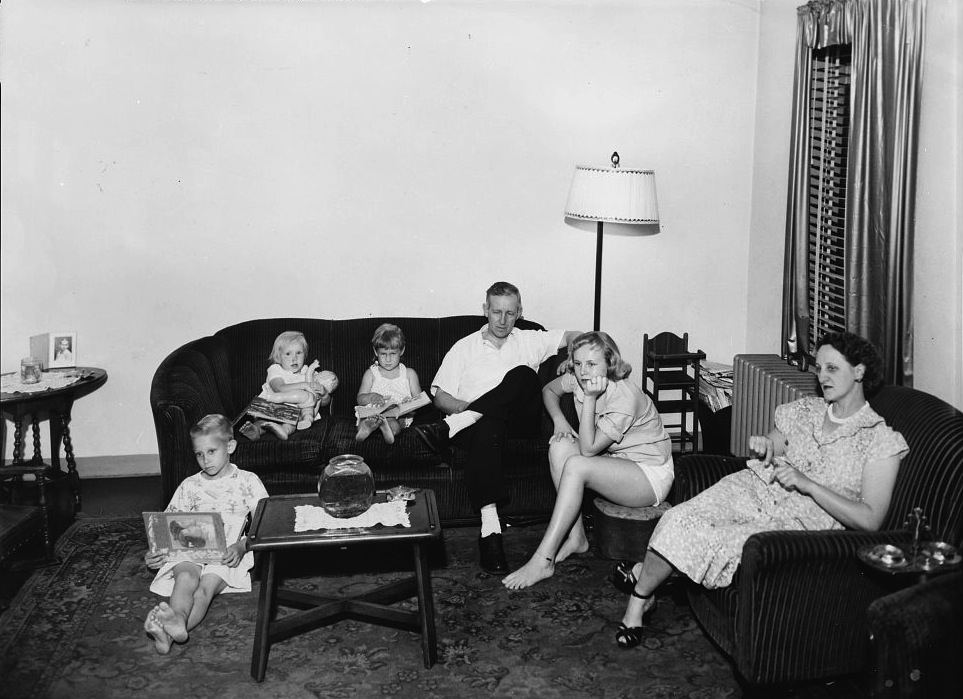
Family in Techwood Homes apartment, late 1930s

=== Founding and prewar era ===
Until 1937, all public housing in the United States was under the control of the PWA's Housing Division. With the passing of the Wagner-Steagall Act, this was moved to the newly created United States Housing Authority (USHA) under the Department of the Interior. At the same time, most of the administration was decentralized to local housing authorities. In 1938, Atlanta's Board of Aldermen created the Atlanta Housing Authority. It would be overseen by a five-member board of commissioners appointed by the Mayor, but otherwise be politically independent from the city. The Board of Aldermen granted the AHA the power of eminent domain and tax exemption, and later delegated to it the task of overseeing urban renewal. Charles Palmer was elected the first chairman of the Board of Commissioners in 1938, and would serve in that position until 1940.

Throughout the early period of the AHA's existence, public housing was closely connected with slum clearance. This was especially emphasized by US Secretary of the Interior Harold Ickes, who saw slum clearance as a positive good in itself, regardless of whether the units were replaced with public housing. Nonetheless, at the time it was taken for granted that replacement housing had to be built. In addition, public housing during this period was seen as a tool for shaping the working class into model citizens. In Atlanta, as elsewhere, tenants were carefully chosen in order to conform to middle-class values (for example, no unwed mothers). This created communities that were largely homogeneous, mostly consisting of young married couples with children. Only in the postwar era would public housing begin to serve lower-class families, and only gradually would it become associated with the poorest of the poor.

After its creation in 1938, the AHA immediately began petitioning the federal government for funds to construct new housing. During the three years preceding the war, six new housing projects would be completed. For whites, there were Capitol Homes and Clark Howell Homes. For African Americans, the AHA built Herndon Homes, John Hope Homes, John Egan Homes, and Grady Homes. This amounted to 4,000 housing units accommodating 20,000 people. The total investment was $21 million to that point. City historian Franklin Garrett remarked humorously, "By 1940, federal funds have built considerably more housing in Atlanta than Federal representative William T. Sherman destroyed here in 1864", referring to the Union general who ordered the burning of Atlanta. With the onset of the war, Atlanta (unlike other cities) paused the construction of new public housing. The next complex would not be erected until 1951.

=== Postwar era ===
Slum clearance and the construction of public housing continued until 1956. By the end of that year, 516.8 acres of slums had been cleared and a total of 12 housing projects had been constructed. Excluding Harris Homes, which was completed in 1956, Atlanta's public housing was home to over 27,000 people (it was built for 25,000). The AHA announced that Harris Homes would be its "last low-rent project", as it was redirecting its efforts to urban redevelopment, which was to replace public housing. This shift represented the decoupling of slum clearance (or urban renewal) from public housing. It was no longer seen as a necessity to replace cleared neighborhoods with new units. From 1956 to 1966, highway construction and other urban renewal projects would displace almost 67,000 people, most of them Black. Only 11% of those displaced would be rehoused in public housing.

The final phase of housing construction began in 1962 with the approval of funds to construct Bowen Homes. This was completed in 1964, and was followed by such projects as Antoine Graves, Bankhead Courts, and East Lake Meadows, among others. In general, these projects were larger and of lower quality than those built before 1956. The projects were desegregated in 1968, and were some of the last public facilities to do so. Whites had been leaving the projects and the city already, but integration prompted virtually all remaining whites to leave the projects. Other projects continued to be built into the 1970s, as well as several high-rises for senior citizens, but after 1973 construction mostly ceased.

=== 1970s to 1996 Olympics ===
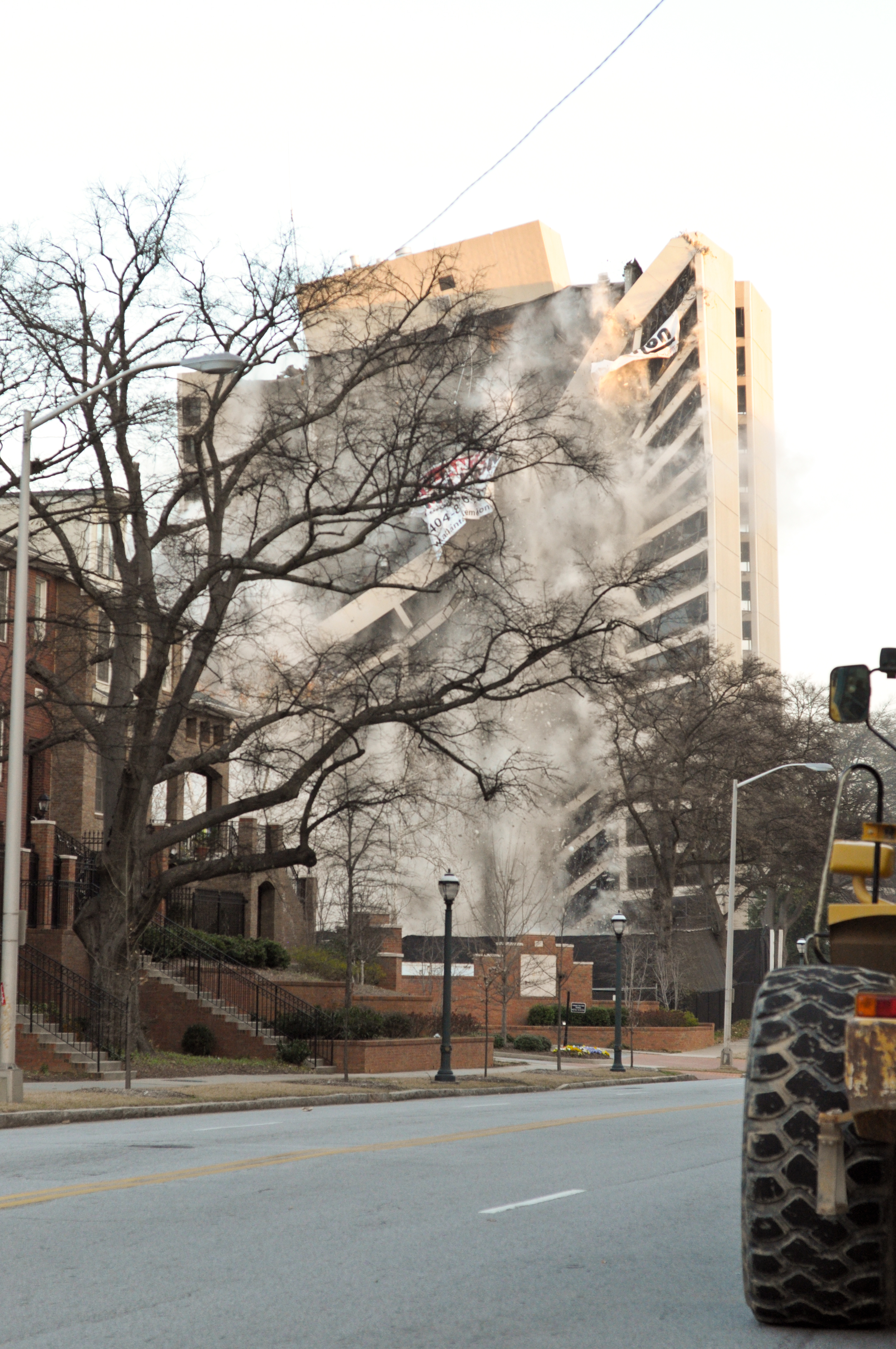
Roosevelt House demolition, 2011

By 1973, the political consensus that had supported public housing in Atlanta had broken down. Criticism from the left, such as from the underground newspaper The Great Speckled Bird, focused on the shoddy construction of recent projects, and the lack of funding for basic maintenance. The "moderate" coalition of businessmen and wealthy elites that dominated Atlanta politics had realized that they could continue slum clearance and urban renewal without needing to build adequate replacement housing. And when Maynard Jackson, Atlanta's first Black mayor, was elected by a coalition between Blacks and progressive whites, he went on a tour of public housing in the city that focused on their deteriorating conditions. With rising crime rates city-wide and several high-profile crime stories that involved the projects, the Atlanta public began to see public housing as a new version of the slums. East Lake Meadows in particular became known as "Little Vietnam" due to the high number of shooting deaths.

In 1990, Atlanta was selected to hold the 1996 Summer Olympics. This led many city leaders to become concerned about the state of public housing in the city, at a time when HUD had labelled the AHA one of the worst housing authorities in the nation. On the national level, concerns about the state of public housing had led Congress to appropriate funds for HOPE VI, a program designed to revitalize public housing. In 1993, Atlanta won the first HOPE VI grant to renovate and modernize Techwood and Clark Howell Homes. At first, the idea of replacing public housing with mixed-income housing was not considered, and the entire project was to remain public housing. The Integral Group and McCormack Baron Salazar together won the contract in 1994 to demolish Techwood and build its replacement, Centennial Place. By the opening of the 1996 Olympics Techwood had been demolished, although visitors were able to tour a virtual exhibition of the project. When Centennial Place opened, the concept had changed to that of a mixed income community, with only 300 of the previous 1100 units remaining for low-income residents.

Centennial Place was positively recognized by HUD and the Urban Land Institute. As of 2007, Centennial Place had a math, science and technology-focused elementary school, a YMCA, a branch bank, a child-care facility, and retail shops. There were plans to include homeownership units.

=== The new model: MICs ===
In 1994, Renee Glover became chairperson of the AHA, and became a major advocate for the Centennial Place project. After its completion, she began to work towards demolishing the rest of Atlanta's public housing, with the goal of replacing them with "Mixed-Income Communities", or MICs. This concept was formalized in 1996, and was adopted by the HOPE VI program on a national level. From 1996 until 2011, Atlanta continued the process of tearing down the complexes, taking advantage of relaxed federal rules in effect through 2010. The agency offered residents who qualified a variety of relocation options and long-term assistance that included federal rent-assistance vouchers that could be used anywhere in the country. However, not all residents qualified for the vouchers. When Bowen Homes was demolished in 2011, Atlanta became the first American city to demolish all of its family public housing. However, only a small fraction of the units demolished were actually replaced with units in mixed-income communities. This was in part because those units were never planned for construction, in part because the Great Recession of 2008 led the AHA to cancel rebuilding plans. Because Atlanta landlords are not required to accept housing vouchers, many presumably left the city or became homeless.

In 2011, the AHA also tore down the Roosevelt House and Palmer House senior-citizen high-rises and relocated residents into other properties. However, the John O. Chiles and Cosby Spear senior citizen high rises remained open.

=== Issues during the wind-down phase ===
As AHA began to systematically close and demolish the projects, a number of issues arose.

In 2004, AHA required all adults without diagnosed disabilities between the ages of 18 and 61 to be employed or successfully participating in job training or some other educational assistance. By 2007, nearly all able-bodied adults living in the remaining housing projects were compliant.

In 2008, residents of Bowen Homes and others expressed concern that AHA was not finding homes for their relocation prior to demolition of the 3,000 families living in the complex. According to research done the conversion to vouchers was concentrating the displaced residents by race and income in violation of the Fair Housing Act, prompting a filing of a fair housing complaint with the U.S. Department of Housing and Urban Development (HUD). HUD was charged with approving the applications for demolitions.

== AHA today ==
The AHA continues to provide housing or housing assistance to low-income families, albeit at a smaller scale. 12 communities are owned by the AHA and overseen by private property management firms, including 10 senior high-rises and 2 low-rise complexes for families. They are home to 1,793 households. Since 1995, the AHA has helped fund the creation of 16 mixed-income communities owned by private developers. These serve 3,996 households. The AHA provides housing vouchers to 8,391 households. Through a program called Homeflex, the AHA assists private developers in providing housing to 3,364 qualifying households. Finally, the HAVEN program provides 1,941 households at risk of homelessness with housing and intensive counseling dispersed throughout their programs.

At the end of 2017, the AHA was serving 23,180 households. These were classified into five groups:

- 10,136 working families
- 8,196 families with children
- 6,116 senior households
- 3,106 disabled households
- 1,436 supportive housing units

=== Current properties ===
Name	Location	Management Company	Type of residence
Barge Road	2440 Barge Rd. SW, Atlanta, GA 30331	The Michaels Organization	Senior high-rise
Cheshire Bridge Road	2170 Cheshire Bridge Rd. NE, Atlanta, GA 30324	Integral	Senior high-rise
Cosby Spear Highrise	355 North Ave. NE, Atlanta, GA 30308	Columbia Residential	Senior high-rise
East Lake Highrise	380 East Lake Blvd. SE, Atlanta, GA 30317	Columbia Residential	Senior high-rise
Georgia Avenue Highrise	174 Georgia Ave. SE, Atlanta, GA 30312	Integral	Senior high-rise
Hightower Manor Highrise	2610 ML King Dr. SW, Atlanta, GA 30311	Columbia Residential	Senior high-rise
Juniper & Tenth Highrise	150 Tenth St. NE, Atlanta, GA 30309	Columbia Residential	Senior high-rise
Marian Road Highrise	760 Sidney Marcus Blvd. NE, Atlanta, GA 30324	Integral	Senior high-rise
Marietta Road Highrise	2295 Marietta Rd. NW, Atlanta, GA 30318	Columbia Residential	Senior high-rise
Martin Street Plaza	142 Georgia Ave. SE, Atlanta, GA 30312	Integral	Family low-rise
Peachtree Road Highrise	2240 Peachtree Rd. NW, Atlanta, GA 30309	The Michaels Organization	Senior high-rise
Piedmont Road Highrise	3601 Piedmont Road NE, Atlanta, GA 30305	The Michaels Organization	Senior high-rise
Westminster	1422 Piedmont Ave. NE, Atlanta, GA 30309	Integral	Family low-rise

=== Controversies ===
In 2016, it was found that Atlanta Housing Authority's publicly paid executives evaded federal rules capping pay at $158,700 by supplementing their salaries with money from the nonprofit National Housing Compliance, which receives money from a contract with the U.S. Department of Housing and Urban Development to administer low-income housing.

== See also ==
- Atlanta mixed-income communities
- Demolished public housing projects in Atlanta
- Economy of Georgia (U.S. state)
- Families First of Georgia
- HOPE VI
