= McCormack Baron Salazar =

McCormack Baron Salazar, LLC
- Type: Private
- Industry: Real estate development Financial services Real estate management Community development Property investment Urban planning Urban design
- Founded: 1973
- Headquarters: St. Louis, MO
- Key people: Richard Baron, co-founder Terry McCormack, co-founder
- Number of employees: 931 (2019)
- Website: www.mccormackbaron.com

McCormack Baron Salazar is an American real estate development firm based in St. Louis, Missouri specializing in economically integrated urban neighborhoods with more than $4.23 billion invested in affordable and mixed-income housing projects. McCormack Baron Salazar provides development as well as ongoing property management services, development financing and tax credit services, and asset management services.

== History ==
McCormack Baron & Associates was founded in 1973 by Richard Baron, a public interest and civil rights attorney representing public housing tenants in St. Louis and Terrence "Terry" McCormack, former homebuilder and consultant to labor unions who were interested in developing elderly housing for union members. Baron was representing tenants in a public housing rent strike and McCormack was working with the local Teamsters as part of a coalition called in to help resolve the conflict.

McCormack and Baron saw the opportunity of redeveloping inner city neighborhoods. In contrast to large-scale urban renewal projects, early McCormack Baron developments focused on small, single site, mixed income rental properties with access to schools, services and local economic opportunities for residents.

Terry McCormack died in 1981 the same year his son Kevin, who was a vice president of a New York bank, joined the firm. In 1985 Tony Salazar joined the firm and in 2003, he became president of West Coast operations rebranding the firm McCormack Baron Salazar.

McCormack Baron Salazar developed a mixed finance, mixed income approach to urban revitalization and their early projects served as a model for the U.S. Department of Housing and Urban Development HOPE VI program. McCormack Baron Salazar developed the first HUD Hope VI pilot project at Centennial Place in Atlanta, GA. Since that time, McCormack Baron Salazar has developed and manages more than 7,000 apartments in 29 HOPE VI developments.

In 2010 the Hope VI program was revamped as the "Choice Neighborhoods" program. McCormack Baron Salazar was awarded two of the first Choice Neighborhood implementation grants for the Eastern Bayview project in San Francisco and for the Iberville/Treme project in New Orleans.

In 2009 McCormack Baron Salazar created the Sunwheel Energy Partners subsidiary to provide solar energy programs linked to affordable housing and urban development. Sunwheel installs solar panels on public, affordable and mixed income housing developments to help lower energy costs. The firm uses the federal New Markets Tax Credit Program to bring renewable energy components to affordable housing communities in St. Louis, New Orleans, Memphis and various cities in California. According to the Journal of Tax Credits, 2600 solar panels installed by McCormack Baron saved the St. Louis Housing Authority $40,000 a year in energy savings.

In 2010, the Urban Investment Group of the bank Goldman Sachs purchased a stake in McCormack Baron Salazar adding two Goldman representatives to the company's board. Goldman Sachs had been an investment partner with McCormack Baron in the re-development of The C.J. Peete public housing site in New Orleans' which had been destroyed by Hurricane Katrina.

== Developments ==
Between 1973 and 2018 McCormack Baron Salazar developed more than 21,000 homes and 1.4 million square feet of commercial space across 197 developments in 46 cities and 22 states, DC, Puerto Rico and the USVI. Community development projects include 37 HOPE VI and Choice Neighborhood developments creating more than 10,500 mixed-income homes. McCormack Baron Salazar has conducted historic rehabilitation of more than 2,000 housing units and nearly 1 millions square feet of historic commercial space.

In 2011 McCormack Baron Salazar became the first ever real estate developer to certify two completed LEED-Neighborhood Developments from the U.S. Green Building Council. McCormack Baron Salazar has a total of five certified LEED neighborhoods, 1 LEED Platinum certified school, 758 LEED certified homes, 26 Enterprise Green Community Criteria sites and 3 HUD Green Community Sites. McCormack Baron Salazar communities have been highlighted as examples of New Urbanism for integrating employment, services and other Urban Design components including transit oriented development and solar power energy programs. McCormack Baron Salazar has 28 solar installation sites providing clean power to communities with more than 3,300 homes.

The McCormack Baron Salazar development portfolio includes:

- Bedford Hill, Pittsburgh, PA
- Carlton Court, Hollywood, CA
- Centennial Place, Atlanta, GA
- Centennial Villa, Kansas City, MO
- Crawford Square, Pittsburgh, PA
- Crossroads College Preparatory School, St. Louis, MO
- East Hampton Apartments, Louisville, KY
- Emerson Park, East St. Louis, IL
- Hayes Valley Apartments, San Francisco, CA
- Henson Village, Phoenix, AZ
- Horace Mann Apartments, Gary, IN
- Irvine Inn Apartments, Irvine, CA
- Lafayette Village, Jersey City, NJ
- Legends Park, Memphis, TN
- Lexington Village, Cleveland, OH
- Heritage Park, Minneapolis, MN
- MacArthur Park Apartments, Los Angeles, CA
- Harmony Oaks, New Orleans, LA
- Pueblo del Sol, Los Angeles, CA
- Quality Hill, Kansas City, MO
- Renaissance Place, St. Louis, MO
- Tobacco Row, Richmond, VA
- Tremont Point, Cleveland, OH
- Triangle Square, Hollywood, CA
- University Place, Memphis, TN
- Villa del Sol Apartments, Kansas City, MO

=== San Francisco ===
Issues with unfixed problems and failed housing inspections are an ongoing concern with at least two McCormack Baron Salazar properties in San Francisco, CA. Alice Griffiths Apartments has failed over 100 housing inspections done in one year by the San Francisco Housing Authority. Plaza East public housing complex, where past mayor London Breed grew up, is leased by McCormack Baron Salazar and tenants sued on multiple occasions since 2011 over habitability issues.

== See also ==
- New Urbanism
- Mixed-income housing
