= Anthony Holm =

- Occupations: Communications strategist, lawyer, author

Anthony Holm is an American communications strategist, lawyer and author. Holm co-founded a political consulting firm, The Patriot Group, in 2006. He has served as special project director for Rick Perry, the former Governor of Texas. In October 2008, Holm founded The First Amendment Alliance. The First Amendment Alliance Education Fund was founded in order to expose corruption and inconsistencies both in the government and the public sector. He has also worked as a spokesman and consultant for Republican mega-donor Bob Perry and his company, Perry Homes, as well as Texas Attorney General Ken Paxton, and Texans for Education Reform.

In 2010, it was alleged that Holm, a Republican consultant, led a GOP backed signature gathering effort through an out of state non-profit corporation to promote Green Party candidates in an effort to elect more Republicans in Texas. Holm denied that account. Holm served on Ken Paxton's campaign for attorney general in 2014. He has also worked for Houston billionaires Laura and John Arnold.

== Bibliography ==
- Anthony Holm (April 25, 2012). 52 Reasons Not to Vote for Obama. Velocity Mascot. ISBN 978-1620860182.
