= Thomasville Heights Projects =

Thomasville Heights Housing Projects
- Interactive map of Thomasville Heights Housing Projects

General information
- Status: Demolished
- No. of units: 350

Construction
- Constructed: 1967

Listing
- Demolished: 2010

Other information
- Governing body: Atlanta Housing Authority

== The Creation of Thomasville Heights ==
Thomasville Heights was built in the late 1960s as part of Atlanta’s public-housing expansion aimed at providing affordable homes for low-income families, most of them Black. Located in southeast Atlanta, the development included several hundred units managed by the Atlanta Housing Authority. Like many similar public-housing sites around the country, it was designed with the hope of creating stable, subsidized living environments for families who had few housing options elsewhere. However, structural limitations, underfunding, and the concentration of poverty would later create long-term challenges for the community.

== Deterioration and Demolition ==
Over the decades, Thomasville Heights suffered from chronic neglect, aging infrastructure, and increased crime, resulting in unsafe and unsanitary living conditions. Many residents struggled with poor maintenance, failing utilities, and limited city investment. By the 2000s, conditions had worsened to the point that officials determined the development was no longer viable. Around 2010, the complex was demolished, displacing families and leaving the surrounding neighborhood with fewer housing resources and a lingering sense of instability.

== Emergence of Forest Cove ==
After the demolition of the Thomasville Heights public housing project in 2010, many displaced families were funneled into Forest Cove, a nearby subsidized complex that was already deteriorating. Throughout the 2010s, Forest Cove’s conditions worsened severely—buildings crumbled, mold and sewage leaks spread, pests infested units, and crime rose sharply—leaving residents in unsafe and unhealthy living environments. Despite a change in ownership during this period, little meaningful repair was done, and the problems deepened. By 2021 a judge condemned the entire property as uninhabitable, leading to the relocation of all remaining households in 2022. Forest Cove’s decline after the Thomasville Heights demolition illustrates how one failing housing development was effectively replaced by another, creating a cycle of displacement and neglect for low-income families in the area.

== Redevelopment ==
Atlanta’s plan for the former Forest Cove site centers on transforming the demolished complex into a mixed-income, mixed-use community that includes hundreds of new housing units, such as roughly 756 apartments, townhomes, and accessory dwelling units, along with new commercial space, green areas, and upgraded infrastructure to revitalize the broader Thomasville Heights neighborhood. The redevelopment is being led by the Atlanta Urban Development Corporation, which has begun soliciting development partners as part of Phase I of a multi-stage revitalization effort, with the goal of replacing the blighted complex with safe, modern housing and community amenities while preserving opportunities for former residents to return.
