= Oak Knoll =

Oak Knoll may refer to one of a number of places:

== United States ==
- Oak Knoll, Pasadena, California
- Oak Knoll School, an elementary school in Menlo Park, California
- Oak Knoll District of Napa Valley AVA, California wine region in Napa County, California
- Oak Knoll (Atlanta), a subdivision in southeast Atlanta, Georgia that received national attention in the 1930s for its financing model
- Oak Knoll, Florida, an unincorporated area in Manatee County, Florida
- Oak Knoll Naval Hospital, a former hospital in Oakland, California
- Oak Knoll (Winchester, Massachusetts), listed on the NRHP in Massachusetts
- Oak Knoll School of the Holy Child, a private school in New Jersey
- Oak Knoll Wildlife Sanctuary, in Attleboro, Massachusetts
- Oak Knoll Books and Press, a bookseller and publisher in New Castle, Delaware
