= Lakewood Fairgrounds =

Venue in Atlanta

Coordinates: 33°42′11″N 84°23′35″W

Lakewood Fairgrounds, established in 1916 in Lakewood Heights, Atlanta, was built to be the home of the Southeastern Fair. The Lakewood Fairgrounds was located on 117 acres (0.47 km^{2}) of former Creek Indian land, which was situated around a 15-acre (61,000 m^{2}) lake.

== The Southeastern Fair ==
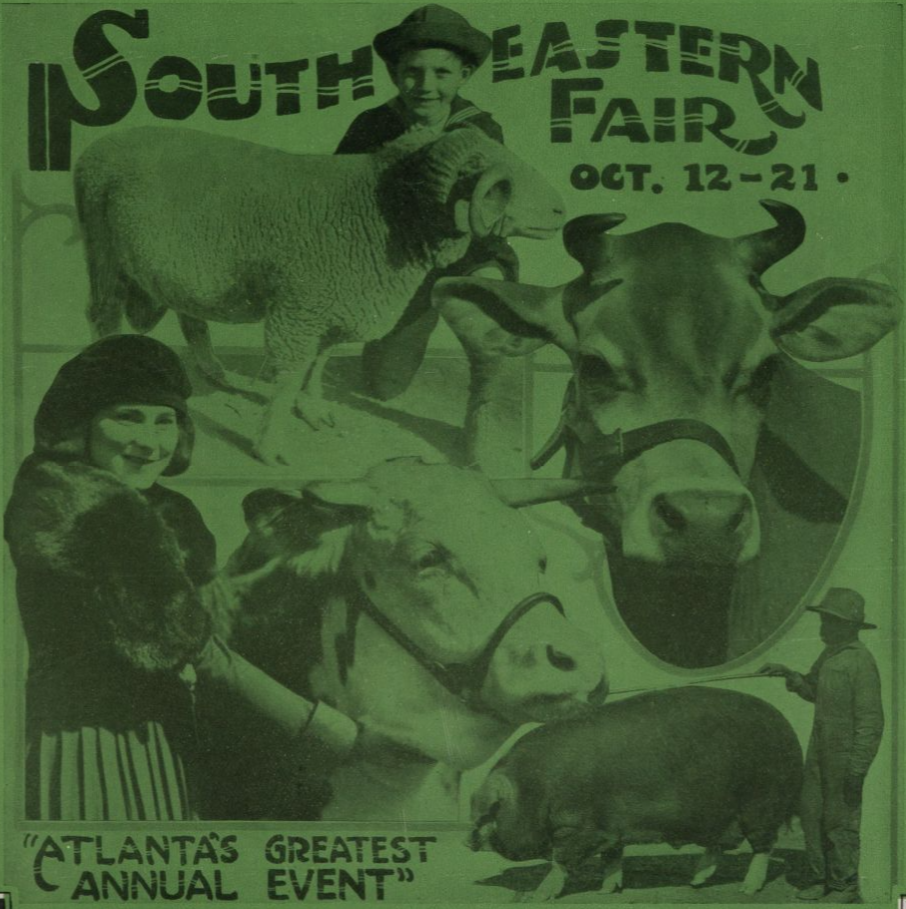
Advertisement for the 1922 Southeastern Fair

There was also a circus big top, arcade games, vendors, and a large carousel that remained on the premises until 1967. It became a popular destination for families in the spring and summer months. In the wintertime, one of the buildings was "converted into a southern anomaly: an ice skating rink."

== Exhibition Halls ==
Lakewood Fairgrounds's most distinctive feature is its four Spanish colonial-style livestock exhibition halls. For over twenty years, the Lakewood Fairgrounds Antique Mall was held in the exhibition halls every second weekend of the month. Over 15,000 antique dealers were on hand for the monthly event, until the weekend of October 13–15, 2006, when the Lakewood Antique Market closed its doors for good. The Fairground halls were leased for the Antiques market on as a 50-year lease from the City of Atlanta by Ed Spivia, who promoted it until it was established as an Atlanta icon.

== The Greyhound ==
The main thrill ride at Lakewood Fairgrounds was the Greyhound. The Greyhound was the old wooden roller coaster that was featured in all three Smokey and the Bandit films. Designed by John A. Miller, it was in operation from 1915 to 1974. The Greyhound was out of service during the early part of the 1956 season due to a major rebuild. After 1974, it sat out of operation for a number of years while the crowds at the fair continued to dwindle around it. Then, after a final repaint, its destruction was captured on film as a scene in the film Smokey and the Bandit II.

== Racing ==
In the '40s, a dirt track was built around the lake, called Lakewood Speedway and was used for various races.

== Film ==
On May 17, 2010, City of Atlanta Council members voted unanimously to lease 30 acres (120,000 m^{2}) to EUE/Screen Gems, which plans to build a studio complex that will include the soundstage as well as office space, a mill shop and lighting facilities.

The media production company EUE/Screen Gems has a 50-year lease with the City of Atlanta to use Lakewood as a film and TV production studio. The company also has plans to build a 37,500-square-foot (3,480 m^{2}) sound stage. The company is currently using the existing historic structures at Lakewood for film and TV production.

In September 2023, Cinespace Studios acquired the Atlanta studio facilities from EUE/Screen Gems.
