= Demolished public housing projects in Atlanta =

In 1994 the Atlanta Housing Authority, encouraged by the federal HOPE VI program, embarked on a policy created for the purpose of comprehensive revitalization of severely distressed public housing developments. These distressed public housing properties were replaced by mixed-income communities.

== Replaced by mixed-income communities ==
=== State Capitol Homes (1941-2003) ===
State Capitol Homes (aka "Capitol Homes") was completed on April 7, 1941 and designed to serve black families in low-rise housing. The 694 units demolished in 2003 were replaced by Capitol Gateway, which includes 1,000 units of housing for various income levels.

=== Carver Community (1953–2000) ===
The Carver Community housing project (aka "Carver Homes") in southeast Atlanta was finished on February 17, 1953, costing $8.6 million and consisting of 990 units for African-Americans. Named for George Washington Carver, the project was located near Joyland, an amusement park for Black Atlanta residents. The project was demolished in 2000 and was partially replaced with the Villages at Carver.

=== John J. Eagan Homes ===
John J. Eagan Homes, also known as Eagan Homes, as a 677-unit complex built in 1941 for black families. It cost $2 million to build and was located in Vine City. The complex was torn down in the 2000s and replaced by Magnolia Park.

=== East Lake Meadows ===
The East Lake Meadows public housing project was a 654 unit community built in 1971 and was one of the most infamous of all of Atlanta's public housing. At the time the nation's largest turnkey project, East Lake Meadows was immediately plagued by maintenance problems due to poor construction. Crime rates soared, and reporter Bill Seldon for the Atlanta Constitution highlighted the project in a series of articles comparing the high number of killings in Atlanta to Vietnam. These articles led to East Lake Meadows gaining the nickname of "Little Vietnam" and helped contribute to the turning of public opinion against public housing.

In the 1990s, as part of his efforts to revitalize the East Lake neighborhood, developer and philanthropist Tom Cousins began working with the Atlanta Housing Authority to replace East Lake Meadows with a mixed-income community. This took place in a larger context of tearing down Atlanta's public housing. In addition to mixed-income housing units, the redevelopment plan included an education center, a private golf course, and various local amenities. Over the course of ten years, East Lake Meadows was demolished and replaced with The Villages at East Lake, the total project costing $172 million.

=== Henry Grady Homes ===
Completed in 1942, Henry Grady Homes (aka "Grady Homes") originally contained 495 units for black families. Located in the Sweet Auburn neighborhood, it was demolished and replaced with the Auburn Pointe mixed-income community.

=== Joel Chandler Harris Homes ===
Built in 1957, Joel Chandler Harris Homes (aka "Harris Homes") was a 510-unit housing site and the last project built that was intended for white residents before the housing projects were integrated after passage of the federal Civil Rights Act in 1964. It was replaced by Ashley Collegetown. The adjacent John O. Chiles Senior Residence Building was renovated.

=== John Hope Homes ===
Built adjacent to University Homes in 1941, John Hope Homes 606 units was originally built for black families. In the 2000s, it was demolished and replaced with The Villages at Castleberry Hill.

=== McDaniel Glenn ===
The McDaniel Glenn housing project was built in 1967, with the Martin Luther King Memorial Building (a highrise for the elderly) constructed in 1970. Making the complex peak at 768 units Part of the Mechanicsville neighborhood, the complex was demolished in 2006. By 2007, Columbia Residential had completed their redevelopment of the property, named Columbia at Mechanicsville Station. The Martin Luther King High-Rise was demolished with explosives on February 14, 2010.

=== Herman E. Perry Homes ===
Herman E. Perry Homes (aka "Perry Homes") was completed in 1954 with 1,100 units for black families. Part of the project was destroyed by a tornado on March 24, 1975, with the buildings being replaced in 1976–77. The project's demolition was completed in 1999, and it was replaced with the West Highlands development.

=== Techwood Homes / Clark Howell Homes ===
Techwood Homes was the first federally funded public housing project in the United States, with 1,230 units opening in 1936. Located in the Centennial Hill district of Downtown Atlanta, it was joined by Clark Howell Homes (both all white) in 1940. In the run-up to the 1996 Olympics, Techwood and Clark Howell Homes were demolished and replaced by Centennial Place.

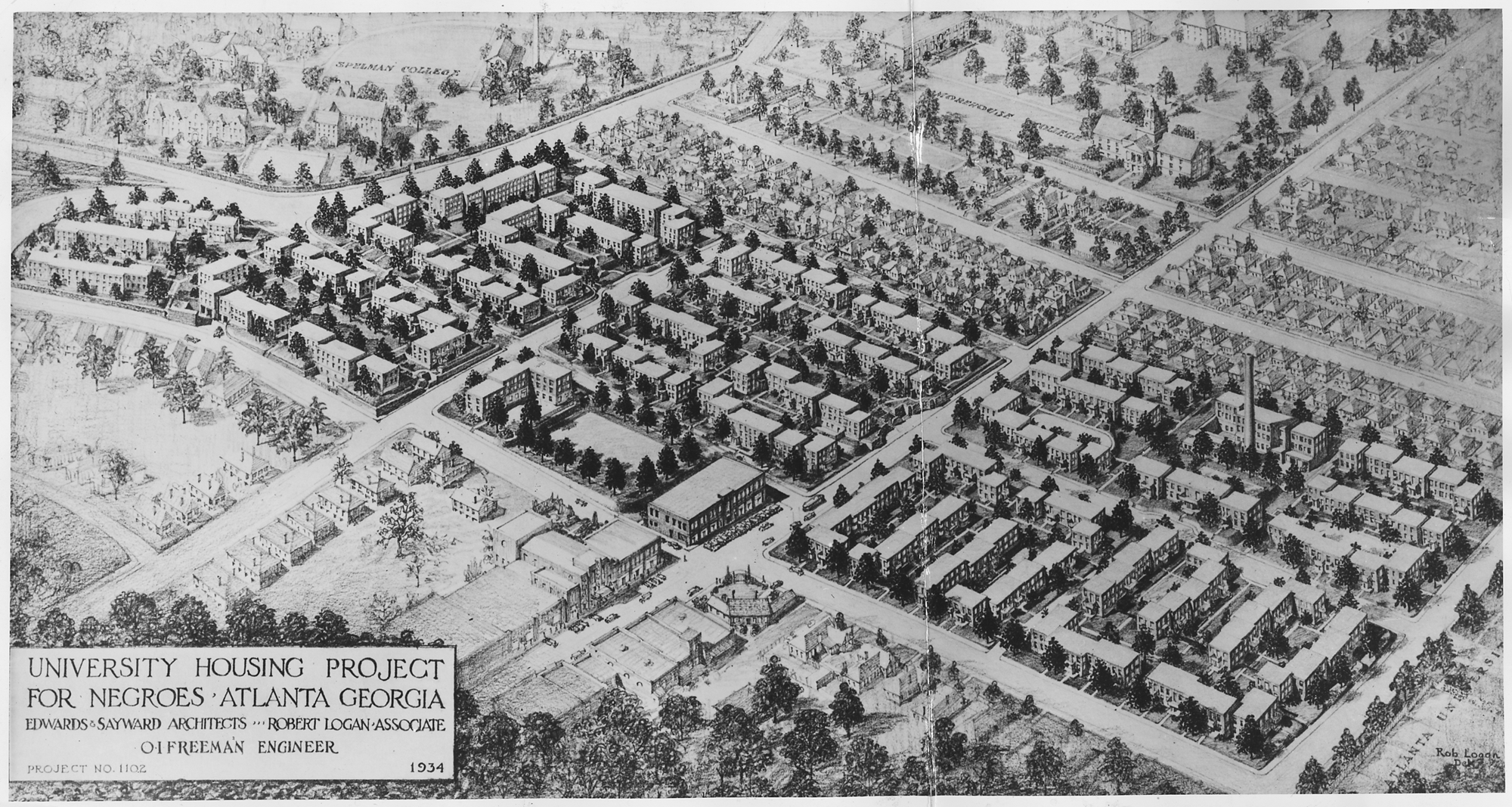
Public Works Administration: Architect's drawing of the University Housing Project in Atlanta, Georgia will replace slums depicted in 53227(1596), 1934

=== University Homes ===
Built in 1938 on the site of the former Beaver Slide slum. Seen as the African American counterpart to Techwood Homes - the first public housing project in the nation. Architect William Augustus Edwards. Residents of the deteriorating community were relocated in 2006, with 675 units being demolished in 2009. In September 2015, the US Department of Housing and Urban Development (HUD) awarded a Choice Neighborhoods Implementation Grant to revitalize the former University Homes public housing site, along with the Atlanta University Center, Ashview Heights, and the Vine City neighborhoods. The "University Choice Neighborhood" housing plan renamed University Homes to "Scholars Landing." Construction will be complete in 2023.

== Demolished (vacant land) ==
=== Antoine Graves Elderly Highrise ===
Senior citizen highrise built 1965. Architect John C. Portman Jr. who designed numerous high-rises in Downtown Atlanta (such as AmericasMart, Peachtree Center, and Hyatt Regency Atlanta). This was one of Portman's earliest and most influential projects, his first atrium building and only public housing project. It was located at 126 SE Hilliard St. SE, Downtown, and was demolished 2009, including annex. Portman attempted to prevent the building from being demolished, but was unsuccessful.

=== Bankhead Courts ===
Bankhead Courts was built in 1970 and consisted of 550 housing units. As of January 2011, "demolition was underway".

=== Bowen Homes (1964-2009) ===
Bowen Homes was a large multifamily housing project built in northwest Atlanta in 1964. Named after John W. E. Bowen, Sr., it included 650 units in a sprawling complex of 104 yellow brick residence buildings, A.D. Williams elementary school, a library, and a day care center. Many inaugural residents were relocated from Buttermilk Bottom in the Old Fourth Ward. Located on Bankhead Highway (since renamed Donald Lee Hollowell Parkway) just inside I-285, the site is now classified as part of the neighborhood of Brookview Heights.

On October 13, 1980 a furnace boiler exploded at the day care center, killing four children and a teacher. Some residents initially claimed the blast was related to the Atlanta child murders of 1979–1981, but it turned out that the boiler's water had been drained for maintenance at the end of the previous heating season and not refilled. On October 13 the cool weather of autumn returned, the day care center requested that the heat be turned on, and maintenance staff relit the boiler not realizing it was empty. This caused a boiler explosion thirty minutes later. In 1982, the Atlanta Housing Authority (AHA) settled out-of-court for $800,000 with ten families seeking damages.

Rapper Shawty Lo was raised in Bowen Homes. He created a mixtape called Bowen Homes Carlos dedicated to the housing project. Bowen Homes was also featured in rapper T.I.'s video What Up, What's Haapnin'. Other musical groups from Bowen Homes include Shop Boyz and Hood Rock. Boxer Evander Holyfield grew up in Bowen.

Bowen Homes was rife with crime. Police reports show 168 violent crimes in the six months between June 2007 and January 2008, including five murders. It was the last large AHA housing project left when it was demolished in 2009. Its razing made Atlanta the first major municipality in the U.S.A. to do so, and its demolition brought the city's era of large multifamily housing projects to a close.

=== Englewood Manor ===
Built in 1970, 324 units of Englewood manor were demolished 2009 by the AHA. The land, which has been under control of the AHA since it was developed in 1970, still sits empty as of 2024.

=== Forest Cove ===
Forest Cove containing 404 was torn down in 2024. It was not a housing project. It was privately owned.

=== Gilbert Gardens ===
Gilbert Gardens (also known as Poole Creek) was built in the 1960s and torn down in 2004. 266 unit housing projects were demolished and families were displaced.

=== Wheat Street Gardens ===
Constructed in 1964 by Wheat Street Baptist Church for low income residents but not a public housing project. Had 606 units divided in one 12 story high rise of 210 units and over 30 three story low-rise buildings located in 4th ward of the sweet auburn neighborhood. Just like all of Atlanta's other public housing, Wheat Street was hit hard in 80s and 90s from the Crack epidemic. Later filmed in the movie "Daddy's Little Girl" right before its demolition in 2006. Even after being torn down drugs still remain a problem in the area.

=== Alonzo F. Herndon Homes ===
Alonzo F. Herndon Homes, also known as Herndon Homes, was completed in 1941, containing 520 units for African Americans. It was demolished in 2010. The project was named for Alonzo F. Herndon, who was born a slave, and through founding the Atlanta Life Insurance Company became Atlanta's richest African American. On June 15, 2016, the Atlanta Housing Authority announced a development team had been selected to create a mixed-use mixed-income community, called Herndon Square, on the site. The first of five phases began construction in January 2020, and is scheduled to complete in Spring 2021.

Herndon Homes was a filming location for the motion picture The Lottery Ticket.

=== Hollywood Courts ===
As of January 2011, the demolition of the 202 public housing units "was almost complete".

=== Jonesboro North ===
145 units were torn down in 2008.

=== Jonesboro South ===
160 units were torn down in 2008. Rapper Young Thug was raised in Jonesboro South Apartments.

=== Leila Valley ===
225 units were torn down in 2008.

=== Palmer House ===
Palmer House was a senior citizen highrise. Built in 1966, it was named after Charles Forrest Palmer, first president of the Atlanta Housing Authority. It was demolished floor-by-floor in Spring 2011.

=== Roosevelt House ===
Roosevelt House was a senior citizen highrise with 150 apartments located at the southwest corner of Centennial Olympic Park Drive and North Avenue. Built in 1973, it was named after Franklin Delano Roosevelt, the American president who, with Atlanta developer Charles Forrest Palmer, founded the national public housing policy. The last residents left in 2009, and it was demolished with explosives on February 27, 2011.

=== Thomasville Heights Projects ===
The Thomasville Heights Projects were built in 1967, with 350 units. They were demolished in 2010.

=== U-Rescue Villa ===
The U-Rescue Villa 70 low rise units was torn down in May 2008. The highrise 283 units still remain.

== Overlook Atlanta ==
A crime-ridden low-income apartment compex demolished its 512 units in 2007.

== Etheridge Courts ==
Low-income apartment complex containing 354 units divided between 4 three/four story building that over the years became dangerous.

== Fairburn Gordon ==
A low income development split into 2 phases with 160 units in phase 1 and 240 units in phase 2. With two separate addresses located within 1/2 mile from each other, the complex was home to a series of crimes over the years. Crime still remains a problem til this day.

== Flipper Temple ==
A subsidize 163 units in one 4 story building was a crime-ridden site throughout the 80s and 90s. Still standing the area still remains a problem.

== Trestletree Village ==
Built in late 1970s in the Ormewood neighborhood of Atlanta's Zone 3 the site was divided into two parts. The first phase constructed into single and two-story buildings with 88 family units and the 2nd phase with two-story 100 garden apt units.

== = Allen Hills (formerly known as Allen Temple) ==
Originally built in 1960s with roughly 500+units in the zone 1 section of the city's Westside. Like public housing the complex turned for the worst by the late 70s. Drug dealers took over building hallways and constant violence infested the neighborhood.

== Amal Heights ==
Built in the 60s with 192 units was remodeled in the late 90s as a part the Pryor Rd Corridor massive redevelopment.

== Bedford Pines ==
A HUD housing project broken into phases built in the 1950s with a massive 783 apartment units. Located in the 4th Ward community like many others also had a long history as being crime ridden. Is torn down and is currently being redeveloped as mixed income Midrise garden apartments.

== East Hampton ==
Built in 1970 with 250 units. In the 1980s the site became notorious throughout the city for drugs and violence. Remodeled in the early 2000s into The Highlands at East Atlanta is still considered to be high crime area.

== Gartrell Court ==
A small 108 unit 3 story complex divided into 7 buildings known as "Paradise". Kept high crime reports especially being in close vicinity to Grady Homes.

== Martin Luther King Village ==
Built as a part of Capitol Homes community with 197 units with one 12 story high rise building and the rest in 3 story low rises.

=== Pittsburgh Civic League ===
Located in the north section of the Pittsburgh neighborhood, the 120 unit complex was divided into 5 3 story buildings. Quickly became known as extremely high drug trafficking area and was demolished in the early 2000s.

=== The View at Rosa Burney ===
The 288 apartment units once a part of the Mc Daniel Glenn housing project were cleaned up and turned into a section 8 apartment complex.

=== The Element at Kirkwood Apartments ===
The apartment units once were a part of the Eastlake Meadows housing project but the Atlanta Housing Authority decided to keep the units and turn them into Section 8 housing.

=== Edgewood Court ===
Edgewood Court , built in 1950, are Section 8 apartments with 204 available units.

== Not demolished ==
=== Martin Street Plaza ===
Martin Street Plaza, in Summerhill, also known as the Summerhill Projects, built in 1979 with 60 units continue operating today.

=== Westminster ===
Westminster is a 32 unit public housing community in Atlanta, Georgia.

=== East Lake Elderly Highrise ===
East Lake Highrise is a 150 unit affordable housing community in Atlanta, East Lake Highrise is owned and managed by the Atlanta Housing Authority also is the last remaining structure of the East lake meadows housing project.

=== Cosby Spear Elderly Highrise ===
Cosby Spear Highrise is a 282 unit affordable housing community in Atlanta, Georgia. The community is located in the 5th Congressional District of Georgia also the last remaining structure of the U-Rescue Villa housing project.

=== Hillcrest Homes ===
Hillcrest (demolished) 100 units used to be owned by the Atlanta housing Authority but was sold to the East Point Housing Authority and has sat vacant but undemolished after the East Point Housing Authority (EPHA) failed to give out section 8 applications.

=== Hidden Village Homes ===
Hidden Village Homes is a 500-unit abandoned housing project once owned by the AHA located 2208 Verbena street, in northwest Atlanta. The complex sits in the Dixie Hill neighborhood. It was abandoned due to fire damage.

=== John O. Chiles Highrise ===
The John O. Chiles Highrise is a 190 unit affordable housing community in Atlanta, Georgia and the first of seventeen highrise buildings constructed by the AHA for the elderly and disabled. It is located in the 5th Congressional district and is the last remaining structure of the Harris Homes housing project.

=== Ed Tucker Memorial Homes ===
Built in 1949, Ed Tucker Memorial Homes (aka “Tucker Homes”) was a 200-unit co-operative housing project designed as a memorial to veterans of Atlanta who gave their lives in World War 2. A combined effort between the FHA and the non-profit Veteran's Corporation, it was named for a young B-24 navigator from College Park, Georgia who died in the battle of Rabaul.

The complex was renovated in 2004 and sold as a private development renamed “The Station at Richmond Hill.”
