= High Point, Atlanta =

Coordinates: 33.716491°N 84.395937°W

High Point
- Neighborhoods of Atlanta
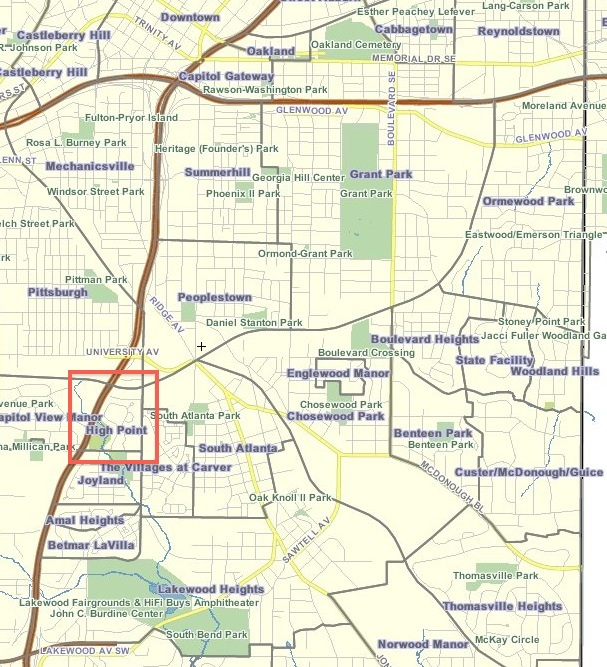
- location of High Point in southeast Atlanta
- Country: United States
- State: Georgia
- County: Fulton County
- City: City of Atlanta
- NPU: Y

High Point is a neighborhood of Atlanta on the south side of the city, bordered by the BeltLine and the neighborhood of Peoplestown, west of South Atlanta and the Villages at Carver, north of Joyland, and east of Capitol View Manor. It is a small planned community containing newly constructed single-family homes, as well as an apartment community designed for senior citizens.
