= Beaver Slide =

Coordinates: 33°44′51.68″N 84°24′36.22″W

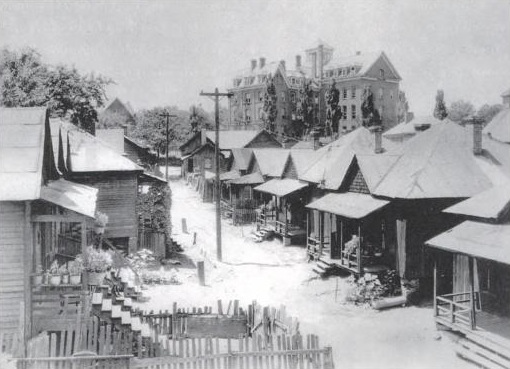
Beaver Slide with Atlanta University in the background

Beaver Slide or Beavers' Slide was an African American slum area near Atlanta University documented as early as 1882. It was replaced by the University Homes public housing project in 1937, which was razed in 2008–9.

Charles Forrest Palmer, the man who organized the clearance of Beaver Slide and creation of University Homes, stated in his autobiographical book that Beaver Slide's name was due to James Beavers, Atlanta Chief of Police from 1911 to 1915, once observing the slum from a hillside, losing his footing and sliding down into the slum, thus: "Beavers' Slide".

Beaver Slide was noted for its criminality. In 1925 the area was targeted for a "cleanup" by city and university authorities.

The area was celebrated musically in the "Beaver Slide Rag" by Peg Leg Howell And His Gang, 1927.

It was finally razed to make for the University Homes public housing projects (William Augustus Edwards, architect), which opened in 1938.

University Homes was razed in 2008–9. As of January 2012 there has been no definitive announcement of what will be built on the land.
