= Bankhead Courts =

- Public housing
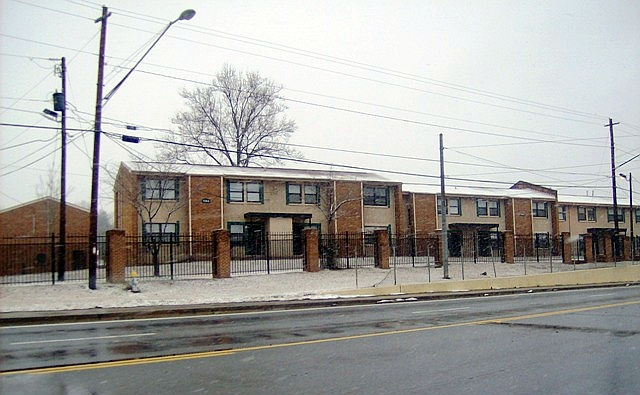
- Bankhead Courts in 2007

- Location within Georgia Location within the United States
- Coordinates: 33°47′34″N 84°30′8″W
- Country: United States
- State: Georgia
- County: Fulton
- Elevation: 774 ft (236 m)
- GNIS feature ID: 1705132

Bankhead Courts was a public housing complex located in Bankhead, Atlanta, Georgia, United States. It was demolished in 2011, with the ultimate plan of redevelopment into a mixed-income community, although as of 2018, development has not yet occurred.

Built in 1970 over a former landfill in the city's far northwest corner, it is surrounded by warehouses and light industry. It was poorly built and the authority moved tenants out of some apartments because of chronic sewage backups. By the late 1980s, out of 1,700 residents, 1,025 were under 19 years old. Ninety-eight percent of the households were headed by women, and the average age of grandmothers there was 32. Cynthia Hoke, a spokeswoman for the Atlanta Housing Authority, said records indicated that only 42 of the residents held jobs. Crime was so rampant at the Bankhead Courts that the mail carriers had to have a police escort making rounds.

== Notable residents ==
For several years, rapper Lil Nas X resided in the housing complex with his mother and grandmother during his childhood
