= Oak Knoll (Atlanta) =

Section of northern Lakewood Heights, Atlanta, Georgia, U.S.

Coordinates: 33.70969°N 84.378098°W

Oak Knoll is a northern section of the Lakewood Heights neighborhood of southeastern Atlanta which received national attention during its construction phase in 1937 for its innovative financing model.

Charles Forrest Palmer, who organized the first public housing project in the United States, Techwood Homes, wrote in his autobiographical book, Adventures of a Slum Fighter about a 1937 meeting with President Franklin Delano Roosevelt, first lady Eleanor Roosevelt and Secretary of the Treasury Henry Morgenthau Jr. At that meeting Mrs. Roosevelt asked about the Oak Knoll project, a subdivision where Palmer and his brother-in-law, Richard Sawtell, were building houses of living room, dining room, kitchen, and two bedrooms to sell for $3,250. The payments of $25.50 a month included taxes and insurance under the government's Federal Housing Administration (FHA) program.

The President commented that the payments toward purchase of the homes were materially less than most rents at that time. Roosevelt was delighted that private enterprise could provide good homes at moderate rentals. Upon the President's question as to whether the government's help in slum clearance would interfere with such private projects, Palmer remarked that the public housing program in Britain had helped materially to expand the operations of the Building Societies there. He compared that to the same situation in the US where public housing did not serve as a pace setter, and where housing improvement projects in the private sector had actually contracted despite FHA support.

Oak Knoll thus served as an early example of success of FHA-backed housing schemes, but also as a driver to move forward with public housing in national policy.

The house at 1099 Oak Knoll Drive was featured in a 1938 issue of Life magazine, as it was a Life "model house"; the model kits were available for purchase from retailers around the country.
