= South Atlanta =

Coordinates: 33°42′54″N 84°23′6″W

- Neighborhoods of Atlanta
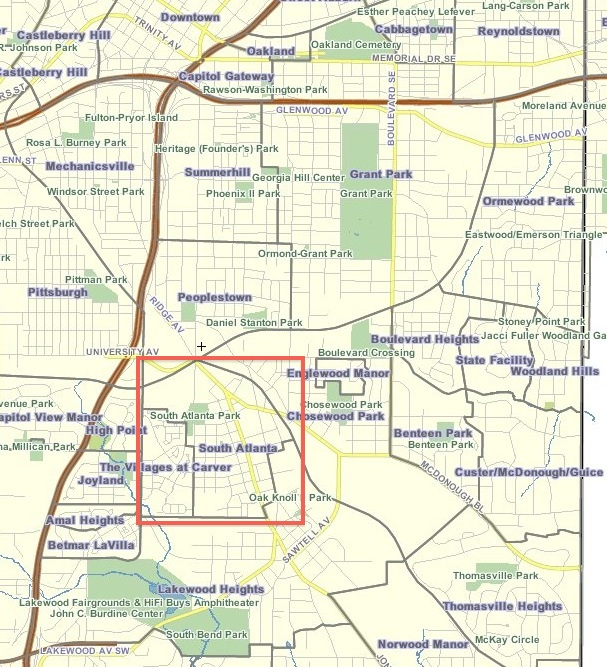
- location of South Atlanta in southeast Atlanta
- Country: United States
- State: Georgia
- County: Fulton County
- City: City of Atlanta
- NPU: Y

Population (2008)Source:
  - Total: 808

South Atlanta is an officially defined neighborhood of the city of Atlanta within the city's south side. It is bounded on the northeast by the railroad and the Chosewood Park neighborhood; on the northwest by the railroad and the BeltLine and the Peoplestown neighborhood, on the west by High Point and the Villages at Carver, and on the south mostly by Turman Street and the Lakewood Heights neighborhood.

== History ==
South Atlanta was originally known as Brownsville. Author Ray Stannard Baker in The Atlanta Riot described it in 1907, in the tone illustrating the presuppositions with which white Americans wrote about African Americans at that time; but nonetheless illustrating the industriousness of Brownsville at the time:

When I went out to Brownsville, knowing of its bloody part in the riot, I expected to find a typical negro slum. I looked for squalor, ignorance, vice. And I was surprised to find a large settlement of negroes practically every one of whom owned his own home, some of the houses being as attractive without and as well furnished within as the ordinary homes of middleclass white people. Near at hand, surrounded by beautiful grounds, were two negro colleges — Clark University and Gammon Theological Seminary. The post office was kept by a negro. There were several stores owned by negroes. The schoolhouse, though supplied with teachers by the county, was built wholly with money personally contributed by the negroes of the neighborhood, in order that there might be adequate educational facilities for their children. They had three churches and not a saloon. The residents were all of the industrious, property-owning sort, bearing the best reputation among white people who knew them.

Clark University (founded in 1869), moved to a site in South Atlanta in 1883, establishing Gammon Seminary Theological Seminary the same year. In 1941 Clark departed to its present location near Downtown Atlanta when it joined the Atlanta University system. It served as a cultural, religious and community anchor in South Atlanta. Its importance was magnified by the fact that at the time, black artists and performers has little opportunity to perform in the South except on black college campuses, and black audiences had little access to "white" cultural activities. Brownsville became an "elite" black community during segregation.

In addition, between 1894–1915, South Atlanta benefited from the development of Lakewood Park and its agricultural fairs which were held annually 1916–1975.
