= Centennial Hill =

Neighborhood of Atlanta, Georgia

Coordinates: 33.76467°N 84.388959°W

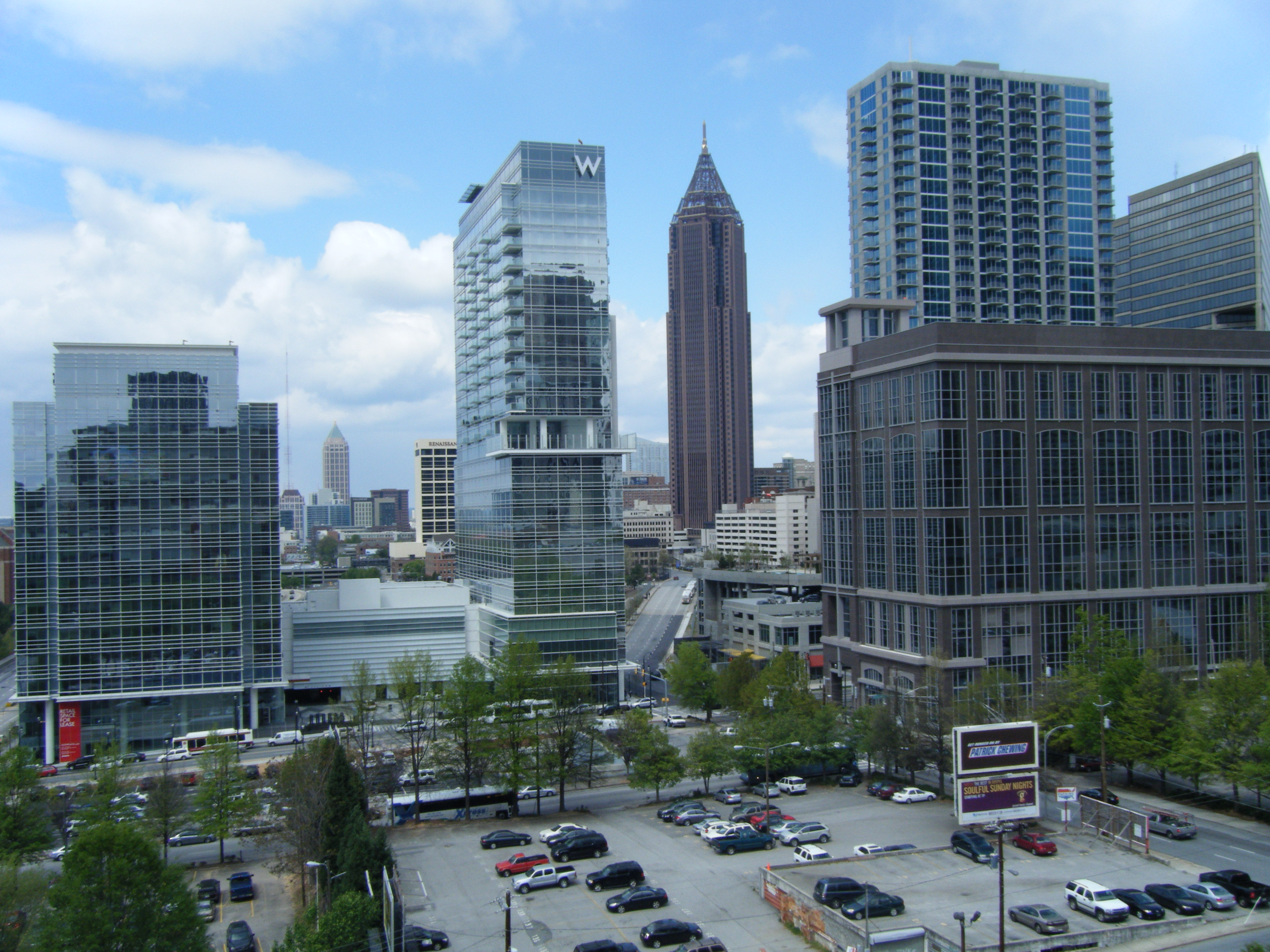
Allen Plaza

Centennial Hill is a district at the northern edge of Downtown Atlanta, Georgia. The name was originally coined by Hines Interests and applied only to their planned development in the area. Although the development was never started and the land later sold, the name remained and became associated with the whole neighborhood. Due in part to the Georgia Aquarium and to renewed interest in city living, Centennial Hill is undergoing a development boom estimated at over US$1 billion . This includes Allen Plaza, an eight-block complex that spans many side streets and borders Ivan Allen. The seasoned developer's project had already delivered the north end of downtown a modern fresh look, with glass buildings that accommodated Southern Co. (and now, Menlo Equities) and Ernst & Young looming over the Downtown Connector and a W Hotel nearby.

The center of the neighborhood is considered to be the intersection of Ivan Allen Boulevard and Ted Turner Drive. The boundaries of the neighborhood are generally acknowledged to be North Avenue to the north, Baker Street to the south, Luckie Street to the west and the Downtown Connector to the east. About half of that area consists of the Centennial Place residential community, which in 1996 replaced Techwood Homes, which in 1936 had been the United States' first public housing project. Previous to the 1930s the area was a slum called Tanyard Bottom or Tech Flats.
