= Families First of Georgia =

Families First is a non-profit family service agency that serves the State of Georgia and assists over 16,000 children and families each year with solutions that aim to improve child well-being and family self-sufficiency.

== History ==
Founded in 1890 as an orphanage on what is now the Spelman College Campus, Families First become the first licensed adoption agency in the State of Georgia in 1937. Families First continued to pioneer in child welfare, opening the state’s first group home in 1964 and developing a national curriculum for divorcing parents in 1989.

== Mission ==
Since its inception in 1890, the agency has addresses community needs such as abandoned, abused and neglected children; teen pregnancy; domestic violence; poverty; health issues; and homelessness.

Families First's mission is to strengthen family resiliency. The agency aims to focus on three impact areas:

- Lucy C. Vance Center for Behavioral Health: Individual, Group, Family, and Couples Counseling (ages 4+), Morehouse School of Medicine Psychiatry Clinic (ages 0-21), Emory University School of Medicine Center for Resiliency (ages 0-5),
- Navigator Services: Community Navigator (Community & Career Resource Connections and Wrap-around Services) and Navigator 2-Gen Model (Maternal Child Health, Teenage Pregnancy & Parenting, and Chispa - Early Learning)
- Parenting and Adoption Support Services: Georgia Center for Resources and Support (for adoptive and guardian families), Georgia Adoption Reunion Registry, Access and Visitation, and Impact Hub Classes (a parent development training course for pre- and post-adoptive and foster families).
