= Charles Forrest Palmer =

American real estate developer (1892–1973)

Charles Forrest Palmer (December 29, 1892 – June 16, 1973) was an Atlanta real estate developer who became an expert on public housing and organized the building of Techwood Homes, the first public housing project in the United States. He would later head up both the newly created Atlanta Housing Authority and the Chamber of Commerce.

== Biography ==
=== Early career in Atlanta ===
Palmer began his real estate and housing career by establishing the C.F. Palmer Company, a realty firm, in Santa Barbara, California. He met Judge John S. Candler, brother to Coca-Cola owner Asa Griggs Candler, who in 1920 persuaded Palmer to move to Atlanta to exploit the commercial investment opportunities there. Palmer opened a real estate firm there, Palmer. Inc., specializing in downtown office properties. As of 1930 Palmer was president of the National Association of Building Owners and Managers, shuttling back and forth between Atlanta and Washington, D.C.

=== Inspiration ===
In the first 100 days of Franklin Delano Roosevelt's new administration in 1933, the National Industrial Recovery Act was passed, which created the federal Public Works Administration (PWA). Of the PWA's more than $3 billion budget, $100 million was targeted towards slum clearance and low-cost housing.

At that time, already for half a century in Europe, philanthropists, industrialists, and governments had been building homes and communities aimed at improving the health and welfare of low and middle income workers. The United States remained the only developed Western country without a national legislative and financial commitment to housing. Palmer wrote in his autobiographical book, Adventures of a Slum Fighter that he had visited London and been told that slum clearance was helping to increase and stabilize real estate values there. Palmer stated repeatedly in his book that he was a Republican and that his primary motivation was benefit to his real estate investments, although slum clearance might well "benefit humanity...as well".

=== Organization of the Techwood project ===
Palmer selected Tech Flats, an integrated community in east Atlanta, (also known as Tanyard Bottom) to be the location of the Techwood project. Techwood would be a whites only neighborhood. Palmer states that he selected Tech Flats was because his commute downtown from his Brookwood Hills home took him along the edge of it every day.

He set up a Board of Trustees including Clark Howell, publisher of the Atlanta Constitution, builder Thorne Flagler, architect Flip Surge, Georgia Tech president Marion L. Brittain, mayor James Key, president of the Atlanta Chamber of Commerce and Herbert Choate, and general manager of the Hearst paper the Atlanta Georgian and Sunday American Herbert Porter, and J. Sid Tiller "from labor".

A sister project, University Homes, which would be built to house Black families and would replace the black Beaver Slide neighborhood was developed by Atlanta University president John Hope, O.I. Freeman, civil engineer, and W.J. Sayward, architect.

Palmer spent several years lobbying Washington for funds to start the project and countering local business interests opposed to the project. In his book, Palmer wrote that delivery of a letter from Howell in person to President Roosevelt did the trick to finally secure funding.

While the two projects were under construction, Palmer returned to Europe in both 1934 and 1936 to research public housing programs there. He used materials and knowledge gathered there to lobby for permanent housing legislation in the United States.

President Roosevelt dedicated Techwood Homes in person in late 1935 and the first families moved in during 1936.

Palmer's private-sector but Federal Housing Administration (FHA)-supported Oak Knoll development was noted in a 1937 meeting by President Franklin Delano Roosevelt, first lady Eleanor Roosevelt and Secretary of the Treasury Henry Morgenthau Jr. Roosevelt was delighted that private enterprise could provide good homes at moderate rentals. The conversation about Oak Knoll drew the conclusion that private projects were in fact strengthened by public housing projects serving as a "pace setter", and helped support arguments for a more proactive nationwide public housing policy.

The house at 1099 Oak Knoll Drive was featured in a 1938 issue of Life magazine, as it was a Life "model house"; the model kits were available for purchase from retailers around the country.

In 1938, Palmer served as President of the Atlanta Chamber of Commerce, and also organized the new Atlanta Housing Authority, of which he served as the first Chairman, until 1940.

=== Later career ===
In 1940 President Roosevelt appointed him as Defense Housing Coordinator (United States Office for Emergency Management, Division of Defense Housing Coordination), a position that he held through 1941. In 1942, he directed the Special Housing Mission to the U.K., researching British plans for post-war urban and economic recovery. In subsequent years he served in many roles advising on housing improvement, lecturing, and writing. Besides his book, Palmer published many articles and speeches on building management, public housing, and urban renewal.
