= HOPE VI =

US HUD Department program for converting rundown public to mixed-income housing

HOPE VI was a program of the United States Department of Housing and Urban Development. It was intended to revitalize the most distressed public housing projects in the United States into mixed-income developments. Its philosophy was largely based on New Urbanism and the concept of defensible space.

The program began in 1992, with formal recognition by law in 1998. As of 2005, the program had distributed $5.8 billion through 446 federal block grants to cities for the developments, with the highest individual grant being $67.7 million, awarded to Arverne Houses/Edgemere Houses in New York City. The U.S. Congress ceased funding the program in 2012. The program was replaced by the Choice Neighborhoods Initiative.

HOPE VI has included a variety of grant programs including: Revitalization, Demolition, Main Street, and Planning grant programs. As of June 1, 2010 there have been 254 HOPE VI Revitalization grants awarded to 132 housing authorities since 1993 – totaling more than $6.1 billion.

== History ==
The success of the mixed-use, mixed-income Columbia Point Housing Projects on Columbia Point in Boston, Massachusetts inspired and contributed to development of the HOPE VI model. Built in 1954, and consisting of approximately 1,500 apartment units, these apartments had fallen into disrepair and become dangerous as a center of crime and dysfunction. By the 1980s, only 300 families remained in the complex, where the buildings were falling apart.

Eventually, realizing the situation was almost hopeless, in 1984 Boston turned over the management, cleanup, planning, and revitalization of the property to a private development firm, Corcoran-Mullins-Jennison, that won a competition for the project. The construction work for the new Harbor Point development began in 1986 and was completed by 1990. It was developed as a mixed-income community, called Harbor Point Apartments.

Congress established the National Commission on Severely Distressed Public Housing in 1989 to study the issue of dilapidated public housing. After it submitted the report to Congress in 1992, legislation creating the HOPE VI grants was drafted and passed. One of the first HOPE VI pilot grants, which in the first year of the program were $50m before being reduced in future years, was given to the Atlanta Housing Authority (AHA) in 1993. Other housing authorities that received pilot grants included Baltimore and New Haven.

This first grant was based on renovating/modernizing Techwood Homes, the nation's oldest housing project, and about a third of adjacent Clark Howell Homes. The grant envisioned Techwood/Clark Howell remaining entirely public housing. Although a mixed-income approach combining market rate units with subsidized units was not part of the first HOPE VI grant awards, these redevelopment grants required private equity often in the form of Low Income Housing Tax Credits (LIHTC) which created what are known as “mixed finance”, combining governmental sources with private sources in what is now known as a “public-private partnership”. The only eligible applicants for a HOPE VI Grant were federal public housing authorities.

The Atlanta-based The Integral Group partnered with McCormack Baron Salazar of St. Louis, and won a bid in the fall of 1994 for development of a new mixed-income project. They developed Centennial Place, which has continued as a successful mixed-income community. Instrumental in the process was AHA's new CEO Renee Lewis Glover, who over the next decade guided the agency through the demolition of its large, declining housing projects. They were replaced on AHA land by private-public ventures of mixed-use, mixed-income communities modeled on Centennial Place, with a portion of units reserved for former public housing tenants. The first HOPE VI mixed-income community (where public housing was a component) was Phase I of Centennial Place, which closed on March 8, 1996. Glover distinguished the Atlanta program, which included providing vouchers to former tenants of public housing for privately held units, by requiring residents to participate in work or study programs to remain qualified for subsidized housing. These elements became known as the Atlanta Model.

Henry Cisneros, then Secretary of Housing and Urban Development, described the HOPE VI program as the last gasp for public housing.

President George W. Bush called for abolition of the HOPE VI program, and Congress reduced funding for the block grants.

San Francisco mayor Gavin Newsom proposed a local version of HOPE VI, using a $100 million public bond referendum to gather private money to rehabilitate outdated public housing projects.

In FY 2009, HOPE VI received a $120 million budget; however, in FY2010 no funds were budgeted for HOPE VI. A new Choice Neighborhoods program had a proposed budget of $250 million. Over the course of 15 years, HOPE VI grants were used to demolish 96,200 public housing units and produce 107,800 new or renovated housing units, of which 56,800 were to be affordable to the lowest-income households. The new and renovated housing units were mixed income, less dense, and sought to attain better design and integration into the local neighborhoods.

== Program concepts ==
HOPE VI makes use of New Urbanism principles, meaning that communities must be dense, pedestrian-friendly, and transit-accessible. Housing is rarely built as apartments. Instead, private houses, duplexes and, especially for public housing projects, row houses are preferred. These buildings provide direct access and connection to the street and communities. Houses are designed to stand close to the street, with small front yards. It is common to see porches on the buildings, where residents can oversee the street, as well as small apartments for single residents built over garages or on the ground floor.

By applying defensible space, most communities are specifically designed or remodeled with private property, emphasizing security. Buildings are low-rise and often integrated directly into failing urban areas by re-establishing the street grid. This can lead to revitalization of surrounding areas. Private custodianship, with individuals taking care of their assigned part of the project, is a critical element. Likewise, providing residents with high-quality materials and houses is believed to encourage pride in the space and an interest in keeping things in good condition. This, theoretically, mitigates vandalism.

In general, much of the philosophy comes from a theory that apartment buildings are not healthy spaces for human habitation. Only with substantial wealth can an apartment building maintain the characteristics of security, social networking, and urban integration that the designers feel is necessary for a healthy community. Instead, the lower-rise, urban feel with a sense of safety in the built environment satisfies that need.

Many of the elements of the program do not produce buildings. More funding goes to housing assistance vouchers than in previous programs. As with the strategy of constructing in-fill housing in middle-class neighborhoods and providing new housing for market-rate buyers, this element enables former public housing residents to be part of existing neighborhoods, to produce a certain cohesion. In almost all implementations of the program, housing authorities and non-profits have provided resident-assistance information programs for new homeowners, teaching them and their neighbors how to take care of a house that they must protect.

== Criticisms ==
Some critics have said that local authorities use the program as a legal means to evict poor residents in favor of more affluent residents in a process of gentrification. They complain that less than 12% of those displaced from old housing eventually move into the replacement housing. In some cases, this is the choice of residents, who want to move to other housing. But one writer asserted that in the case of a section of Cabrini–Green in Chicago, residents were forced out by armed police in order for HOPE VI redevelopment to take place. Projects generally construct fewer units than are demolished, so even in the best of circumstances enough units may not be available for all residents to return.

Federal auditors found that HUD was awarding grants based on the ability of the area to generate income for the city rather than the actual state of the housing project in question. By demolishing low-cost public housing units in an area, city officials can drive up property values in the surrounding area and reduce the number of low-income residents in need of public services. Only seven of the first 34 grants went toward the development of high-rise housing.

Some criticized the new developments because they resulted in a net loss of housing for the poor. As the program does not require a "one-for-one" replacement of the old housing unit, the new project does not have to house the same number of tenants as the old housing unit did. (The one-for-one replacement policy was repealed by Congress in 1998, separately from HUD's implementation of HOPE VI.) The Urban Institute reported that the number of units receiving a federal subsidy and available for the deeply poor to live in is cut in half in developments arising from the program. The National Low Income Housing Coalition has said that no HOPE VI grants should be allotted without requirements for one-for-one unit replacement.

The NLIHC maintains that in order to acquire federal grants, local housing authorities have "demolished viable units and displaced families." The program has been called "notorious" for its allotment of federal grants for demolition of public housing. Some critics said that it has resulted in a "dramatic loss of housing." In San Francisco, which made extensive use of the HOPE VI program to redevelop its aging public housing supply, virtually all projects constructed significantly fewer units than they demolished. In the Hayes Valley, Plaza East, Valencia Gardens, Geneva Towers, and Bernal Dwellings projects, Federal, State, and Local Housing Authorities spent somewhere in the neighborhood of $300,000,000 to create a net loss of 457 apartments.

Some have criticized the program for having the right goals but not accomplishing them, or not going about them in the right way. The National Housing Law Project issued a joint report saying, "HOPE VI has been characterized by a lack of clear standards, a lack of hard data on program results, and misleading and contradictory statements made by HUD." The report said:

HUD's failure to provide comprehensive and accurate information about HOPE VI has created an environment in which misimpressions about the program and its basic purposes and outcomes have flourished- often with encouragement from HUD. HOPE VI plays upon the public housing program's unfairly negative reputation and an exaggerated sense of crisis about the state of public housing in general to justify a drastic model of large-scale family displacement and housing redevelopment that increasingly appears to do more harm than good.

Housing authorities have also been criticized for allowing private management of the eventual redevelopments, which are built with mostly public funding. Others have characterized this is a positive aspect of the program.

The scheme was strongly criticized on the PJ Harvey album The Hope Six Demolition Project (2016).

Al Levine, Seattle Housing's deputy executive director of development, noted that most housing authorities did not commit to replacing all of the demolished units. He said, "Seattle Housing is unique among housing authorities in the HOPE VI program in committing to one-for-one replacement housing for every unit. We take this commitment very seriously."

== Previous projects ==
- Riverview in Kingsport, Tennessee https://web.archive.org/web/20141018175601/http://econdev.kingsporttn.gov/hope-vi-housing-redevelopment
- Hanover Acres in Allentown, Pennsylvania
- Cascade Village in Akron, Ohio
- Edgewood Village in Akron, Ohio
- Pueblo del Sol and Pico Gardens in Los Angeles
- Hurt Village/Lauderdale Courts in Memphis, TN (now Uptown Homes)
- Dixie Homes in Memphis, TN
- Lamar Terrace in Memphis, TN (now University Place)
- LeMoyne Gardens in Memphis, TN (now College Park)
- High Point, Seattle
- NewHolly/Holly Park, Seattle
- Capitol Gateway, Atlanta
- Robert Taylor Homes, Chicago
- Rockwell Gardens, Chicago
- Stateway Gardens, Chicago
- Henry Horner Homes, Chicago
- ABLA, Chicago
- Arthur Capper/Carrollsburg, Washington, DC
- Mechanicsville Commons, Knoxville, Tennessee
- Arthur Blumeyer, St. Louis
- New Columbia, Portland, Oregon
- Oak Hill, Pittsburgh
- Bedford Hill, Pittsburgh
- Richard Allen Homes, Philadelphia, 1992, $50,000,000 revitalization grant.
- Schuylkill Falls, Philadelphia, 1997, $26,400,951 revitalization grant
- Martin Luther King Homes, Philadelphia, 1998, $25,229,950 revitalization grant
- Mill Creek Homes, Philadelphia, 2001, $34,825,000 revitalization grant
- Ludlow Homes, Philadelphia, 2004, $17,059,932 revitalization grant
- Bluegrass-Aspendale Housing Project and Sugar Mill Apartments, Lexington, Kentucky
- Liberty Green and Park DuValle, Louisville, Kentucky
- North Beach, the Western Addition, Hayes Valley, Bernal Heights, and Valencia Gardens in the Mission District, San Francisco, California
- Chestnut Linden Court, Oakland, California
- Desire Projects, New Orleans, Louisiana
- St. Thomas Projects, New Orleans
- John Henry Hale Homes, Nashville, Tennessee
- Sam Levy Homes, Nashville
- CityWest, Cincinnati, Ohio
- First Ward, Charlotte, North Carolina
- Willow Oaks, Greensboro, North Carolina

== See also ==
- Public housing in the United States
- Office of Fair Housing and Equal Opportunity
