= Techwood Homes =

- Techwood Homes Historic District
- Formerly listed on the U.S. National Register of Historic Places
- U.S. Historic district
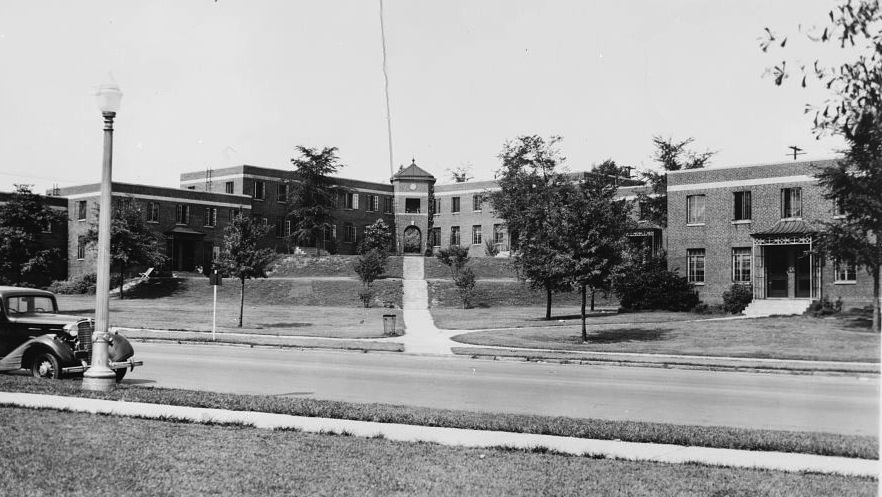
- Techwood Homes, late 1930s

- Location within Atlanta Location within Georgia Location within the United States
- Location: Atlanta, Georgia
- Coordinates: 33°46′4″N 84°23′30″W
- Built: 1935
- Architect: Burge & Stevens; J.A. Jones & Co.
- Architectural style: Colonial Revival
- NRHP reference No.: 76000632

Significant dates
- Added to NRHP: June 29, 1976
- Removed from NRHP: May 29, 2026

Techwood Homes was an early public housing project in the Atlanta, Georgia in the United States, opened just before the First Houses. The whites-only Techwood Homes replaced an integrated shantytown of low-income people known as Tanyard Bottom or Tech Flats. It was completed on August 15, 1936, but was dedicated on November 29 of the previous year by U.S. President Franklin D. Roosevelt. The new whites-only apartments included bathtubs and electric ranges in each unit, 189 of which had garages. Central laundry facilities, a kindergarten and a library were also provided. Techwood Homes was demolished in advance of the 1996 Summer Olympics and is now Centennial Place Apartments.

== History ==
The complex was designed by Georgia Tech alumnus and architect Flippen David Burge of Burge and Stevens (later Stevens & Wilkinson), and organized by Charles Forrest Palmer, a real estate developer who had become an expert on public housing and would later head up both the newly created Atlanta Housing Authority and the Chamber of Commerce. The landscaping was designed by Edith Henderson, who also designed the neighboring Clark Howell Homes with her partner Grace Campbell.

The name came from Techwood Drive, in turn named for nearby Georgia Tech. The project included a 300-student dormitory for Georgia Tech, McDaniel Dormitory, commonly referred to as Techwood Dorm. It was run by the Atlanta Housing Authority. Throughout the 1970s, 1980s, and 1990s the area was synonymous with urban blight in Atlanta.

Techwood Homes was built on land cleared by demolishing the Flats, a de facto integrated shantytown adjacent to downtown, home to 1,611 families, most poor, 28% African American. The Public Works Administration replaced the shantytown with 604 units for white families only, with income qualifiers out of the range of many former inhabitants.

The neighboring Clark Howell Homes was built in 1941 in a less institutional style with 630 units. A. Ten Eyck Brown was the architect. Clark Howell was also reserved for whites until 1968, with an all-black counterpart at the University Homes project (built 1938) near Atlanta University Center.

Except for a few historic buildings, Techwood Homes was demolished in 1996 before the 1996 Summer Olympics. It and neighboring Clark Howell Homes are now a mixed-use area called Centennial Place. The first phase opened in 1996 just before the Centennial Olympics, hence the new name. Former residents were relocated to other areas, given Section 8 vouchers to assist with rent. Only 78 of the original residents were able to move back into Centennial Place, which had far fewer subsidized units than Techwood Homes.

== See also ==
- Demolished public housing projects in Atlanta
