= Atlanta mixed-income communities =

Atlanta, Georgia, United States housing planning policy

In 1996, The Atlanta Housing Authority (AHA) created the financial and legal model for mixed-income communities or MICs, that is, communities with both owners and renters of differing income levels, that include public-assisted housing as a component. This model is used by the U.S. Department of Housing and Urban Development's HOPE VI revitalization program. As of 2011, it has resulted in all housing projects having been demolished, with partial replacement by MICs.

The first of these, Centennial Place, has been recognized by HUD and the Urban Land Institute. As of 2007, Centennial Place had a math, science and technology-focused elementary school, a YMCA, a branch bank, a child-care facility and retail shops. There were plans to include homeownership units.

In 2011, the agency also tore down the Roosevelt House and Palmer House senior-citizen high-rises and relocated residents into other properties. However, the John O. Chiles and Cosby Spear senior citizen high rises remained open.

AHA took advantage of relaxed federal rules in effect through 2010 to raze all remaining communities. The agency offered residents who qualified a variety of relocation options and long-term assistance that included federal rent-assistance vouchers good anywhere in the country. However, not all residents qualified for the vouchers.

== List of mixed-income communities ==
=== Ashley Auburn Pointe ===
Site of former Grady Homes in the Sweet Auburn neighborhood. Includes the Veranda at Auburn Pointe complex.

=== Ashley College Town ===
Site of former Harris Homes, built 1956

=== Ashley Courts at Cascade ===
Site of former Kimberly Courts, off-site for Techwood/Clark Howell

=== Ashley Terrace at West End ===
Formerly off-site for Techwood/Clark Howell

=== Capitol Gateway ===
Site of former Capitol Homes

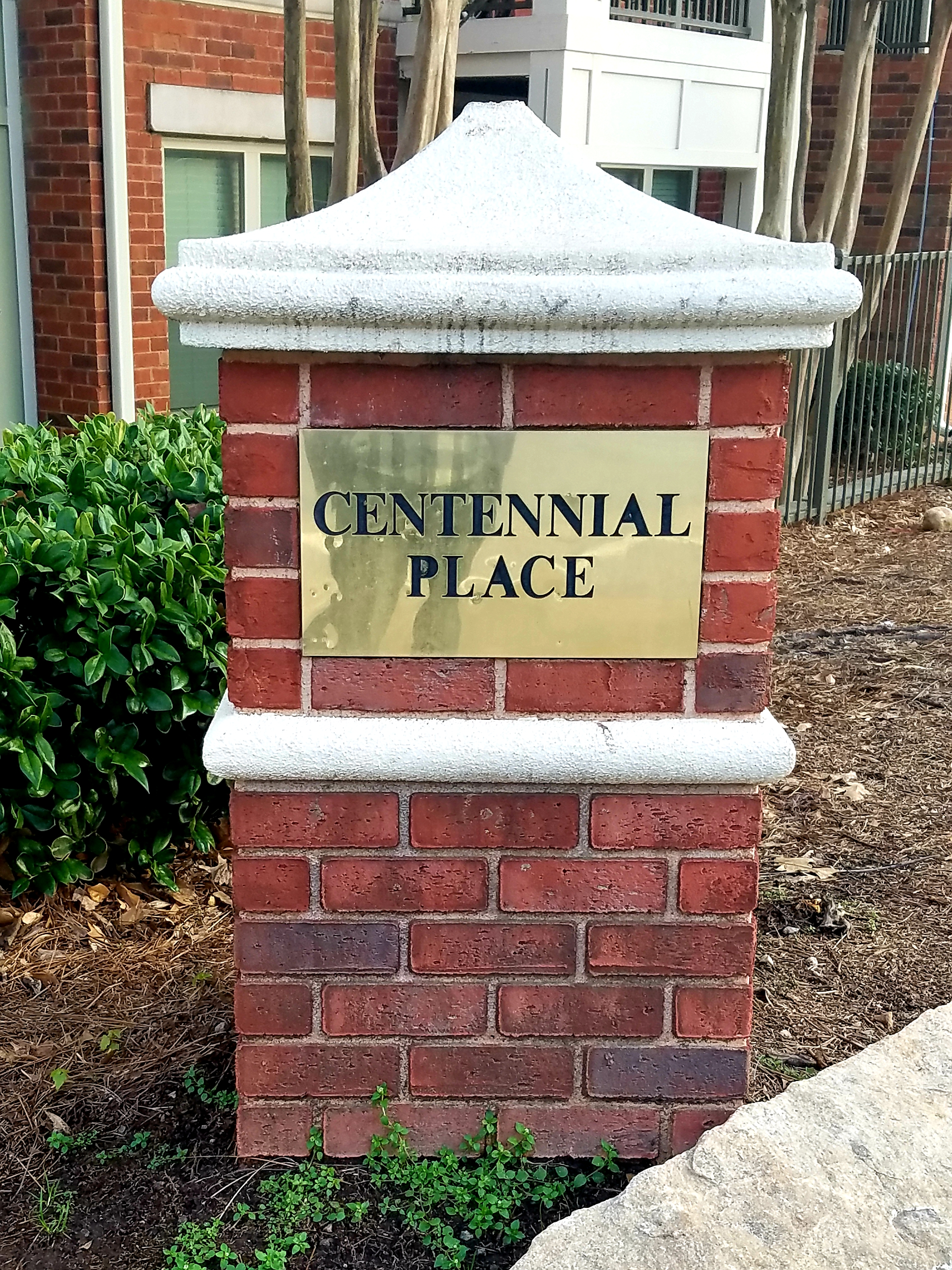
Marker for Centennial Place

=== Centennial Place ===
Site of former Techwood Homes and Clark Howell in the Centennial Hill district of Downtown Atlanta

=== Columbia at Mechanicsville Station ===
Replaced the 41 acres (17 ha) 588-unit McDaniel-Glenn Homes in the northwest corner of Mechanicsville, torn down between February and May 2006.

=== Columbia Commons ===
Formerly off-site for East Lake Meadows

=== Columbia Village ===
Formerly off-site for East Lake Meadows

=== Magnolia Park ===
Opened in 2000 on the site of former John Eagan Homes in Vine City

=== Summerdale Commons ===
In NPU Z in southwest Atlanta. Recognized by the city as an official neighborhood of Atlanta.

=== The Villages at Carver ===
Site of former Carver Homes in southeast Atlanta, west of South Atlanta and east of Joyland and High Point. Recognized by the city as an official neighborhood of Atlanta.

=== The Villages of Castleberry Hill ===
Site of former John Hope Homes. Recognized by the city as an official neighborhood of Atlanta. Despite the name, this community is not in Castleberry Hill and lies south of that neighborhood.

=== The Villages of East Lake ===
Site of the former East Lake Meadows. The redevelopment was driven by developer and philanthropist Tom Cousins. Recognized by the city as an official neighborhood of Atlanta.

=== West Highlands ===
An official neighborhood of Atlanta. Site of former Perry Homes, which were demolished in 1999. Includes

- Columbia Estates, 124 townhouses and garden-style apartments, for rent
- Columbia Heritage, a 132-unit mixed-income seniors housing development
- Columbia Park Citi, a 154-unit mixed-income garden-style apartment complex
- Columbia Crest, a 152-unit mixed-use project with 5,000 square feet (460 m^{2}) of retail space; and
- Columbia Grove, a 138-unit multifamily project that will be the final phase

== Senior citizen highrises ==
While Palmer and Roosevelt were razed, these senior citizen highrises were renovated:

=== Cosby Spear ===
On North Avenue in the Old Fourth Ward

=== John O. Chiles ===
Located at 435 Joseph E. Lowery Blvd. Renovated 2008.
