= Religion in Atlanta =

Religious beliefs in Atlanta

Religion in Atlanta (2014)
1. Protestantism (63.0%)
2. Roman Catholicism (11.0%)
3. Mormonism (1.00%)
4. Jehovah's Witnesses (1.00%)
5. No religion (20.0%)
6. Judaism (1.00%)
7. Other religion (2.00%)
8. Don't know (1.00%)

Religion in Atlanta, while historically centered on Protestant Christianity, now involves many faiths as a result of the city and metro area's increasingly international population. While Protestant Christianity still maintains a strong presence in the city, in recent decades Catholic Christians have gained a strong foothold due to migration patterns. Atlanta also has a considerable number of ethnic Christian congregations, such as Korean Baptist, Methodist, and Presbyterian Churches, the Tamil Church Atlanta, Telugu Church, Hindi Church, Malayalam Church, Ethiopian, Chinese, and many more traditional ethnic religious groups. Large non-Christian faiths are present in the form of Buddhism, Judaism and Hinduism. Overall, there are over 1,000 places of worship within Atlanta.

== Christianity ==
=== Protestant ===
Protestant Christian faiths are well represented in Atlanta as the city is located in the Bible Belt, the city historically being a major center for traditional Southern denominations such as the Southern Baptist Convention, the United Methodist Church, and the Presbyterian Church (USA).

African-American Baptist congregations such as Martin Luther King Jr.'s Ebenezer Baptist Church and Rev. William Holmes Borders' Wheat Street Baptist Church, were instrumental in the Civil Rights Movement in the 1950s and 1960s.

Atlanta is also the see of the Episcopal Diocese of Atlanta, which includes all of northern Georgia, much of middle Georgia and the Chattahoochee River valley of western Georgia. This diocese is headquartered at the Cathedral of St Philip in Buckhead and is led by the Right Reverend Robert Wright.

Atlanta serves as headquarters for several regional church bodies also. The Southeastern Synod of the Evangelical Lutheran Church in America maintains offices in downtown Atlanta; ELCA parishes are numerous throughout the metro area. There are eight United Church of Christ congregations in the Atlanta metro area, one of which, First Congregational, at the corner of Courtland Street and John Wesley Dobbs Ave. downtown, is noted as the favored church of the city's black elite including Andrew Young, for its famous minister Henry H. Proctor and for President Taft having visited in 1898.

Traditional African-American denominations such as the National Baptist Convention and the African Methodist Episcopal Church are strongly represented in the area. These churches have several seminaries that form the Interdenominational Theological Center complex in the Atlanta University Center.

==== Protestant megachurches ====
Well-known Megachurches in the area include pastor Andy Stanley's North Point Community Church in Alpharetta, which Forbes magazine ranked as the third largest church in the United States, the First Baptist Church of Woodstock, First Baptist Atlanta among others. Primarily African American megachurches in Metro Atlanta include Creflo Dollar's World Changers Church International in College Park claiming nearly 30,000 members, Eddie Long's New Birth Missionary Baptist Church in Lithonia with 25,000 members, and Cameron M. Alexander's 12,000-member Antioch Baptist Church North in English Avenue, Atlanta. Atlanta ranks second in megachurches behind Houston.

Protestant churches in Atlanta

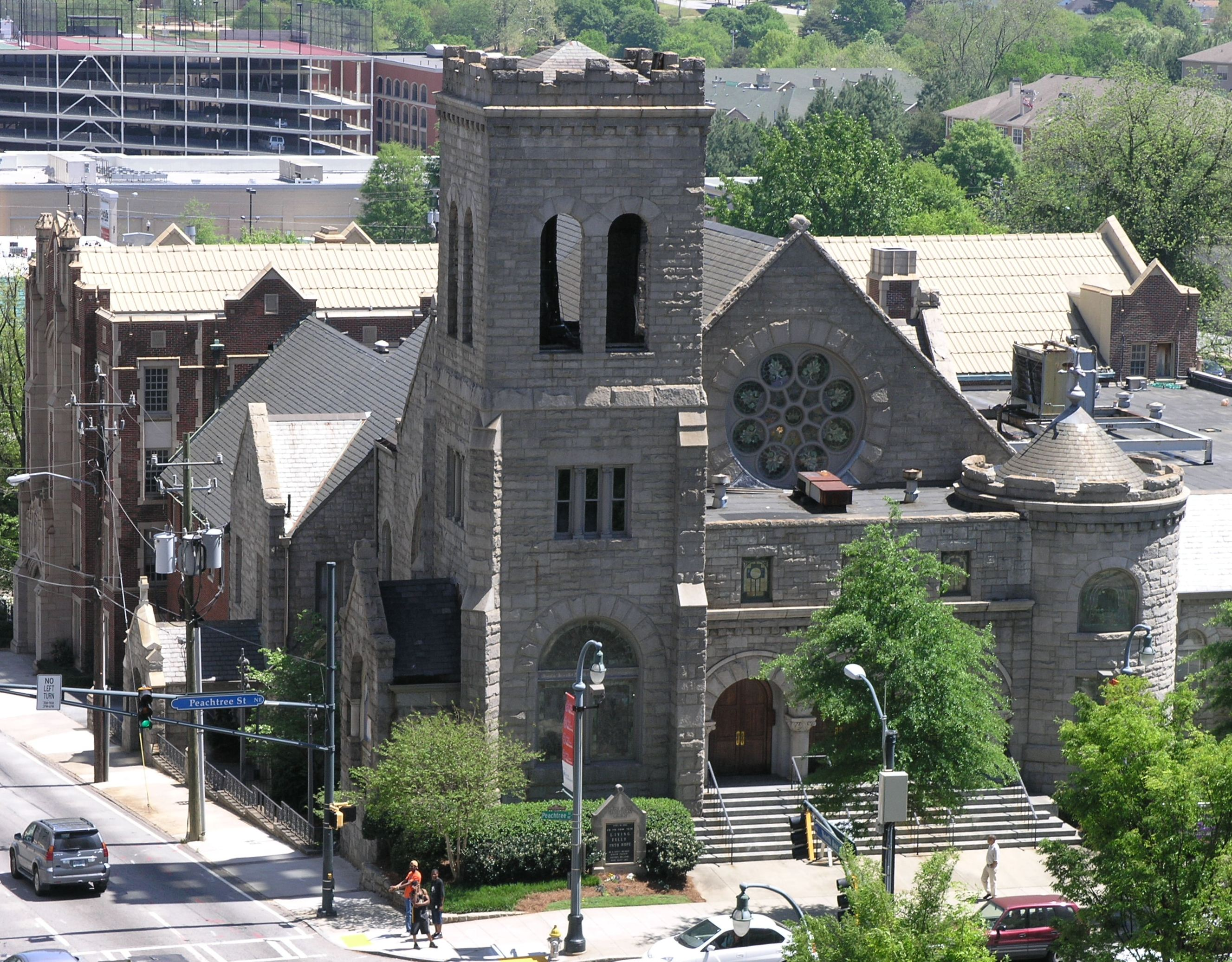
North Avenue Presbyterian Church, on the southeast corner of North Avenue and Peachtree Street

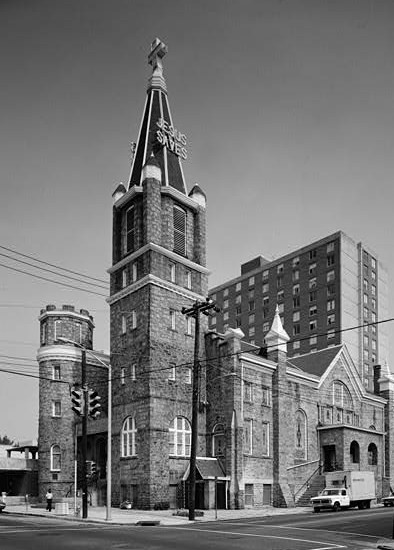
Big Bethel African Methodist Episcopal (AME) Church

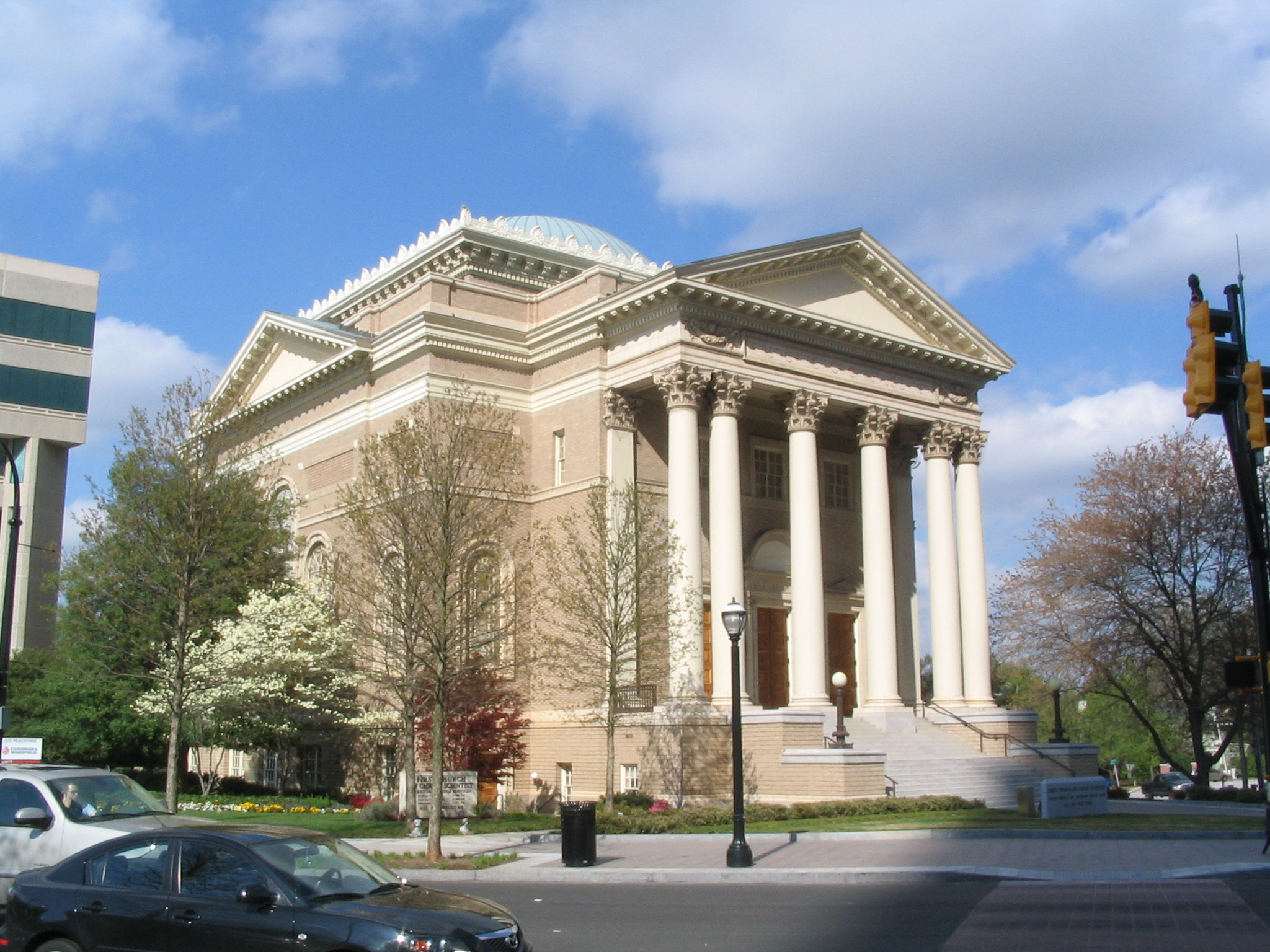
First Church of Christ, Scientist in Midtown Atlanta

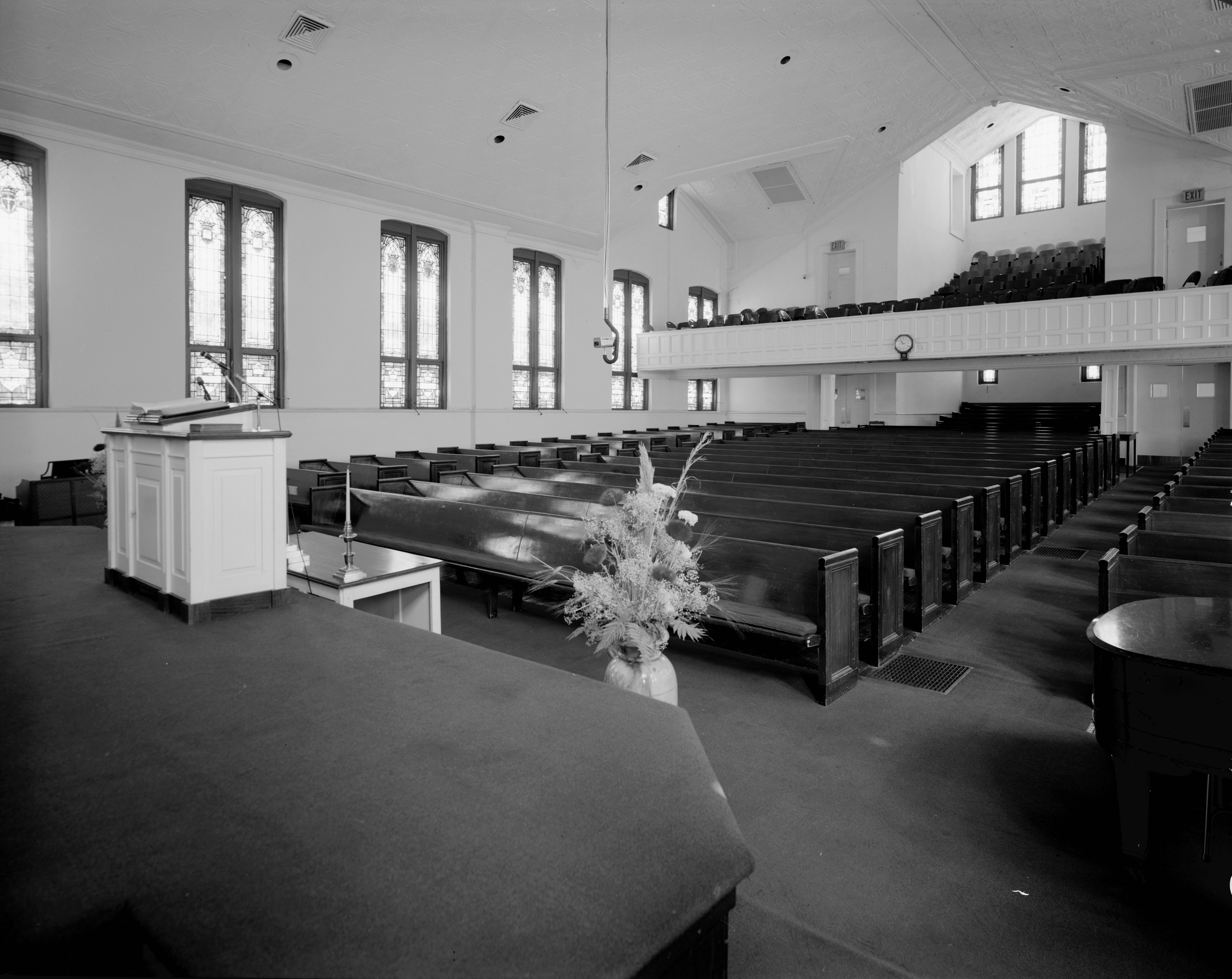
Inside Ebenezer Baptist Church, where Reverend Martin Luther King Jr. preached

=== Catholic ===
In contrast to some other Southern cities, Atlanta's large, and rapidly growing, Roman Catholic population is a trend which didn't take shape until the 1990s. The number of Catholics grew from 30,840 members in 1960 to 292,300 members in 1998 and to 900,000 members (69 Northern Georgia Counties covering an area of 7,150,000 people) in 2010, an increase of 207 percent. However, newcomers and transplants to the Atlanta area, namely metropolitan Atlanta, do not share the same history as people who live in the city limits. Black Atlantans who were born and raised in the City of Atlanta proper have always had a small Black Catholic presence in the city dating from the early 1900s with the establishment of Black parishes such as Our Lady of Lourdes (founded in 1912) and Saint Paul of the Cross that was founded in the 1950s. The increases in large numbers of Catholics in the Atlanta area that occurred in the late 20th century (and continues in the 21st century) is fueled by Catholics moving to Atlanta from other parts of the U.S. and the world, and from newcomers to the church. About 14.3% of all metropolitan Atlanta residents are Catholic Christians compared to 3.1% in 1980 and 1.7% in 1960. As the see of the 84 parish Archdiocese of Atlanta, Atlanta serves as the metropolitan see for the Province of Atlanta. The archdiocesan cathedral is the Cathedral of Christ the King and the current archbishop is Gregory John Hartmayer. Also located in the metropolitan area are several Eastern Catholic parishes which fall in the jurisdiction of Eastern Catholic eparchies for the Melkite, Maronite, Syro-Malabar, and Byzantine Catholics. (Note: These include St. John Chrysostom Melkite Catholic Church; St. Joseph Maronite Catholic Church in the Eparchy of Saint Maron of Brooklyn; Epiphany Byzantine Catholic Church; St. Alphonsa Syro-Malabar Catholic Church; and Holy Family Knanaya Syro-Malabar Catholic Church (Knanaya))

Roman Catholic churches in Atlanta

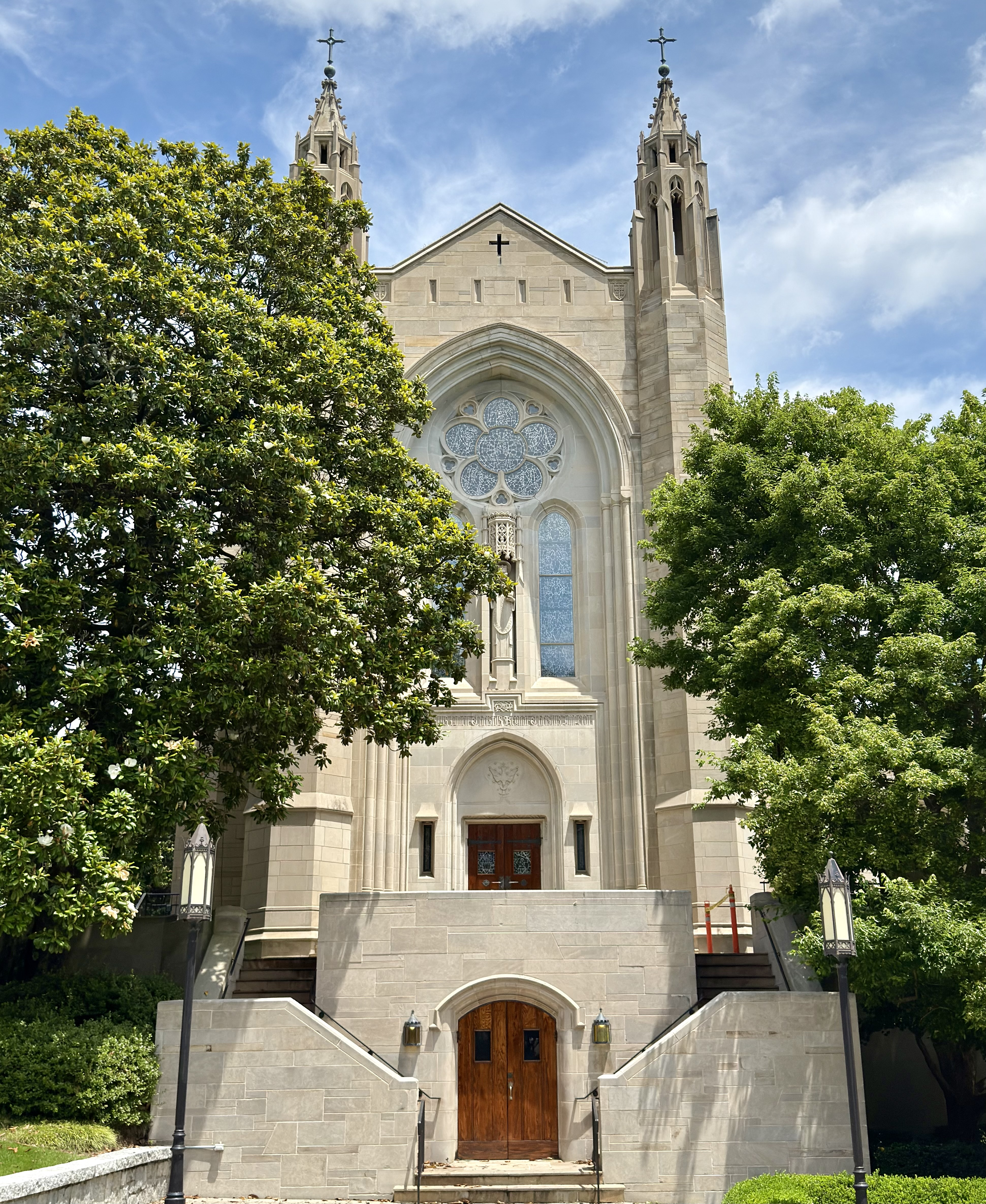
Cathedral of Christ the King, located on Peachtree Road in Buckhead

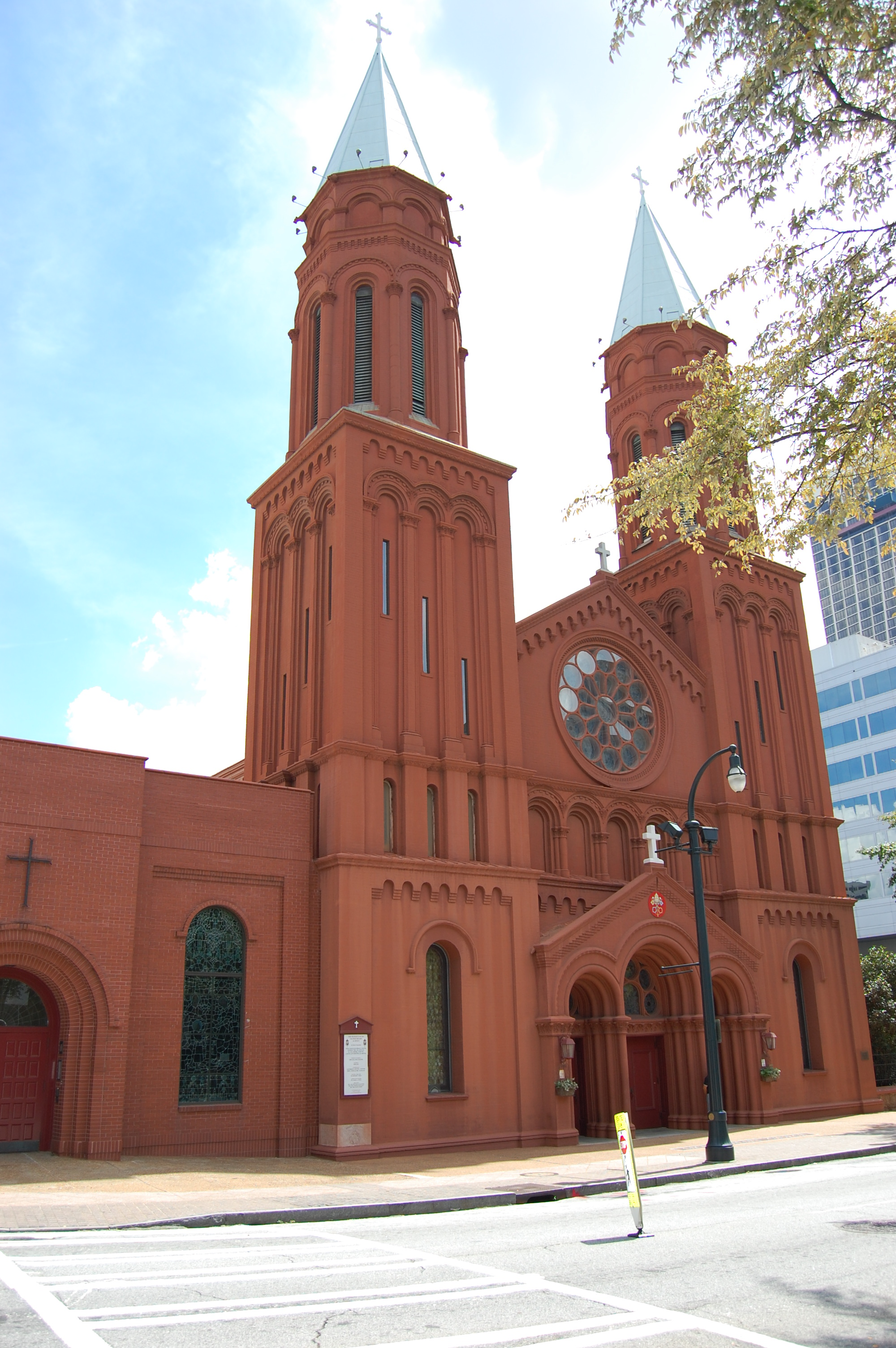
Basilica of the Sacred Heart of Jesus, downtown

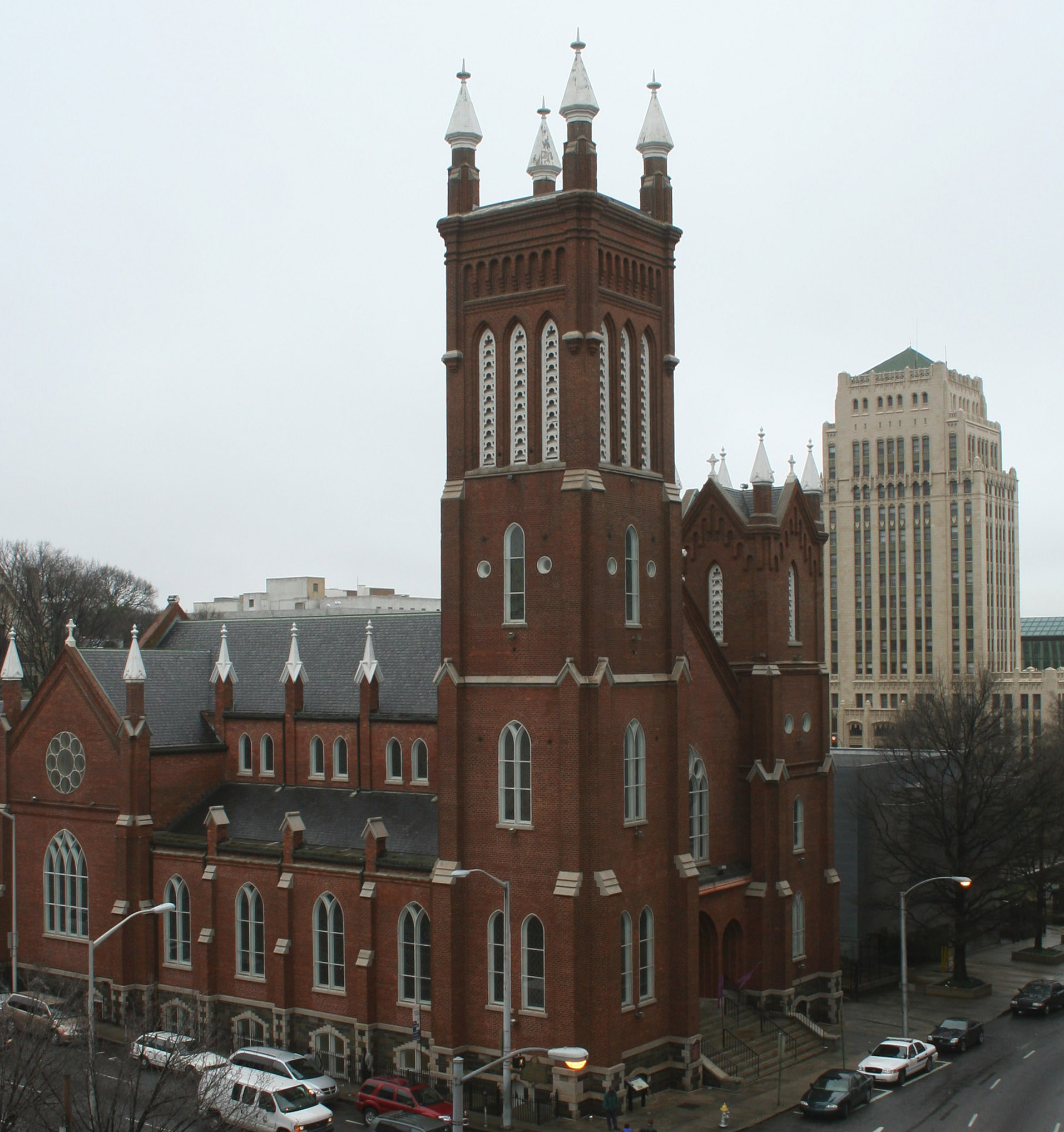
Shrine of the Immaculate Conception (1869), oldest church in Atlanta

=== Eastern Orthodox ===
The city hosts the Greek Orthodox Annunciation Cathedral, the see of the Metropolis of Atlanta and its bishop, Alexios. Other Orthodox Christian jurisdictions represented by parishes in the Atlanta area include the Antiochian Orthodox Church, the Russian Orthodox Church, the Romanian Orthodox Church, the Ukrainian Orthodox Church, the Serbian Orthodox Church and the Orthodox Church in America.

=== Other religious groups ===
The headquarters for The Salvation Army's United States Southern Territory is located in Atlanta. The denomination has eight churches, numerous social service centers, and youth clubs located throughout the Atlanta area.

The city has a temple of the Church of Jesus Christ of Latter-day Saints located in the suburb of Sandy Springs, Georgia called the Atlanta Georgia Temple.

== Other faiths ==
Metro Atlanta's Jewish community is estimated to include 120,000 persons in 61,300 households. As of 2012, Atlanta's Metro Jewish population is 9th largest in the United States, up from 17th largest in 1996. There are eruvim in the Virginia Highland and Toco Hills neighborhoods inside the Perimeter, as well as in Dunwoody, Sandy Springs and Alpharetta in the North metro area.

The BAPS Shri Swaminarayan Mandir Atlanta in adjacent Lilburn, Georgia is currently the largest Hindu temple in the world outside of India. It is one of approximately 15 Hindu temples in the metro Atlanta area, along with 7 other Hindu temples in Georgia serving nearly 100,000 Hindus in Atlanta, Augusta, Macon, Perry, Savannah, Columbus, Rome/Cartersville and other remote centers.

There are an estimated 75,000 Muslims in the area and approximately 3 5 mosques. The largest mosque, Al-Farooq Masjid of Atlanta, is located on 14th Street in Midtown Atlanta. Muslims constitute 1.3% per cent of the population, giving Atlanta the sixth largest Muslim proportion in the country.

Buddhist centers and temples in Metro Atlanta include the Atlanta Buddhist Center in Atlantic Station practicing Nichiren Buddhism and the Tibetan Buddhist Drepung Loseling Monastery in Brookhaven, associated with Emory University and where the Dalai Lama has spoken.

Places of worship of other faiths in Atlanta

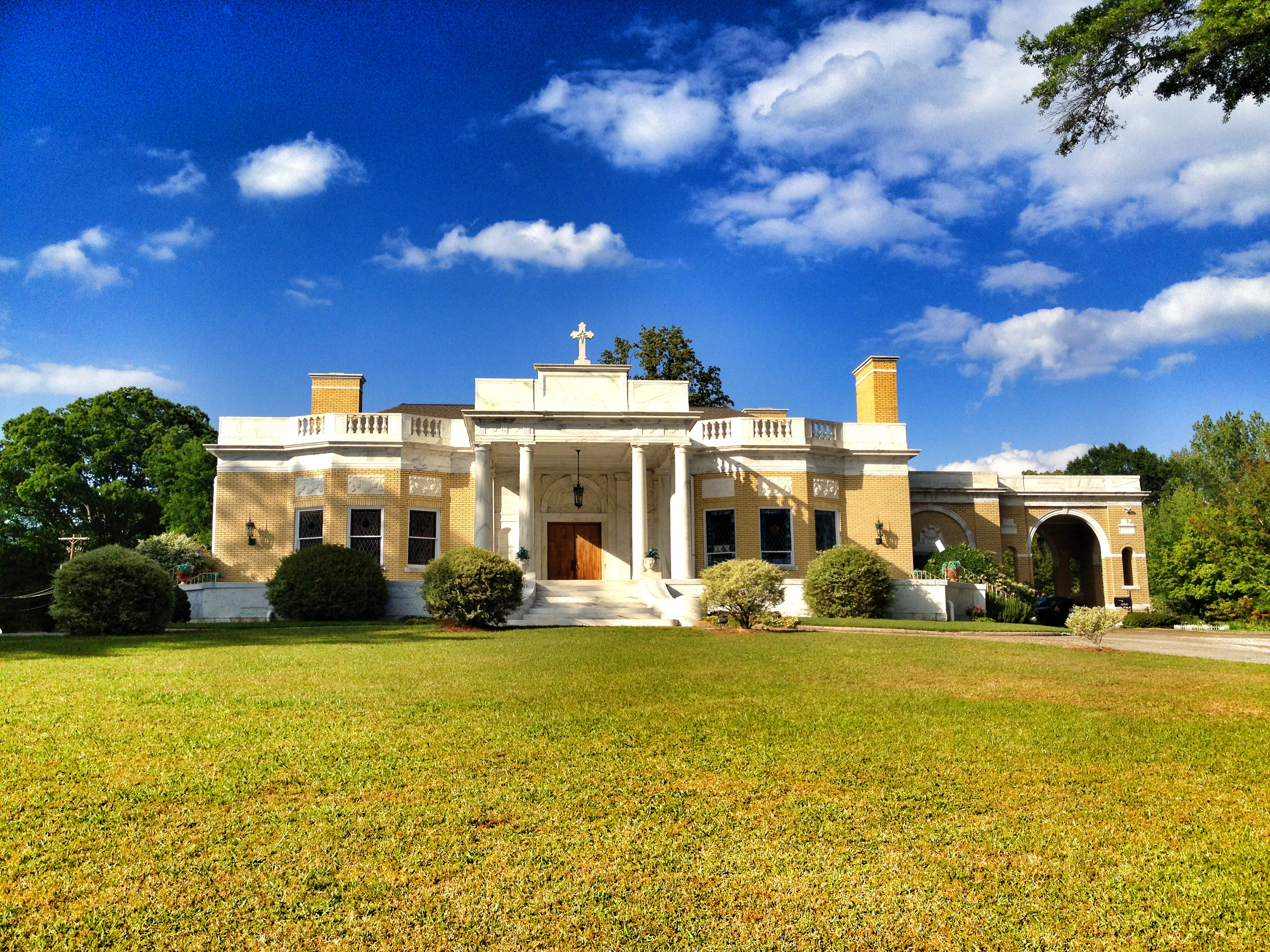
St. John's Chrysostom Melkite Church in Druid Hills, Atlanta, 2012, formerly the mansion of Asa Griggs Candler (Senior)

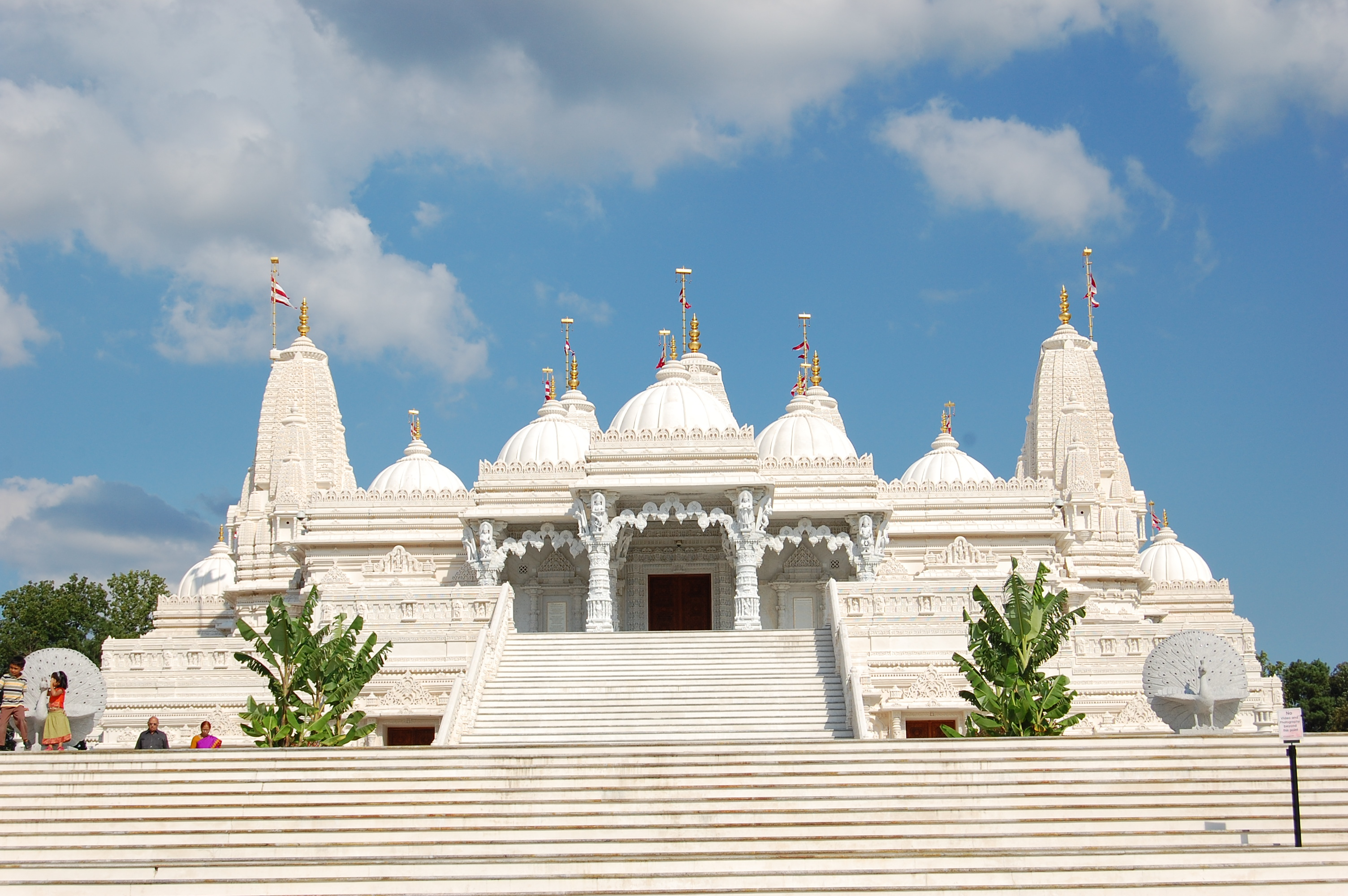
BAPS Shri Swaminarayan Mandir Atlanta in the suburb of Lilburn, the largest Hindu temple outside of India

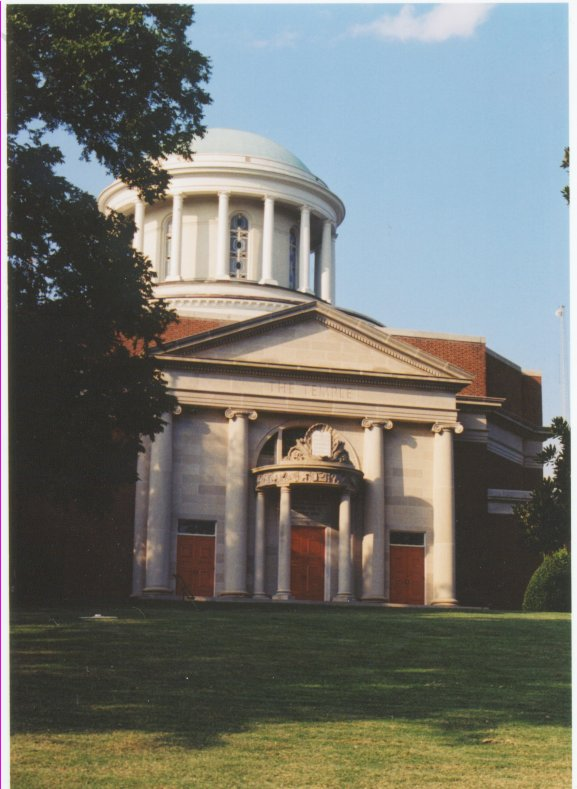
The Temple, synagogue on Peachtree Street in Midtown Atlanta

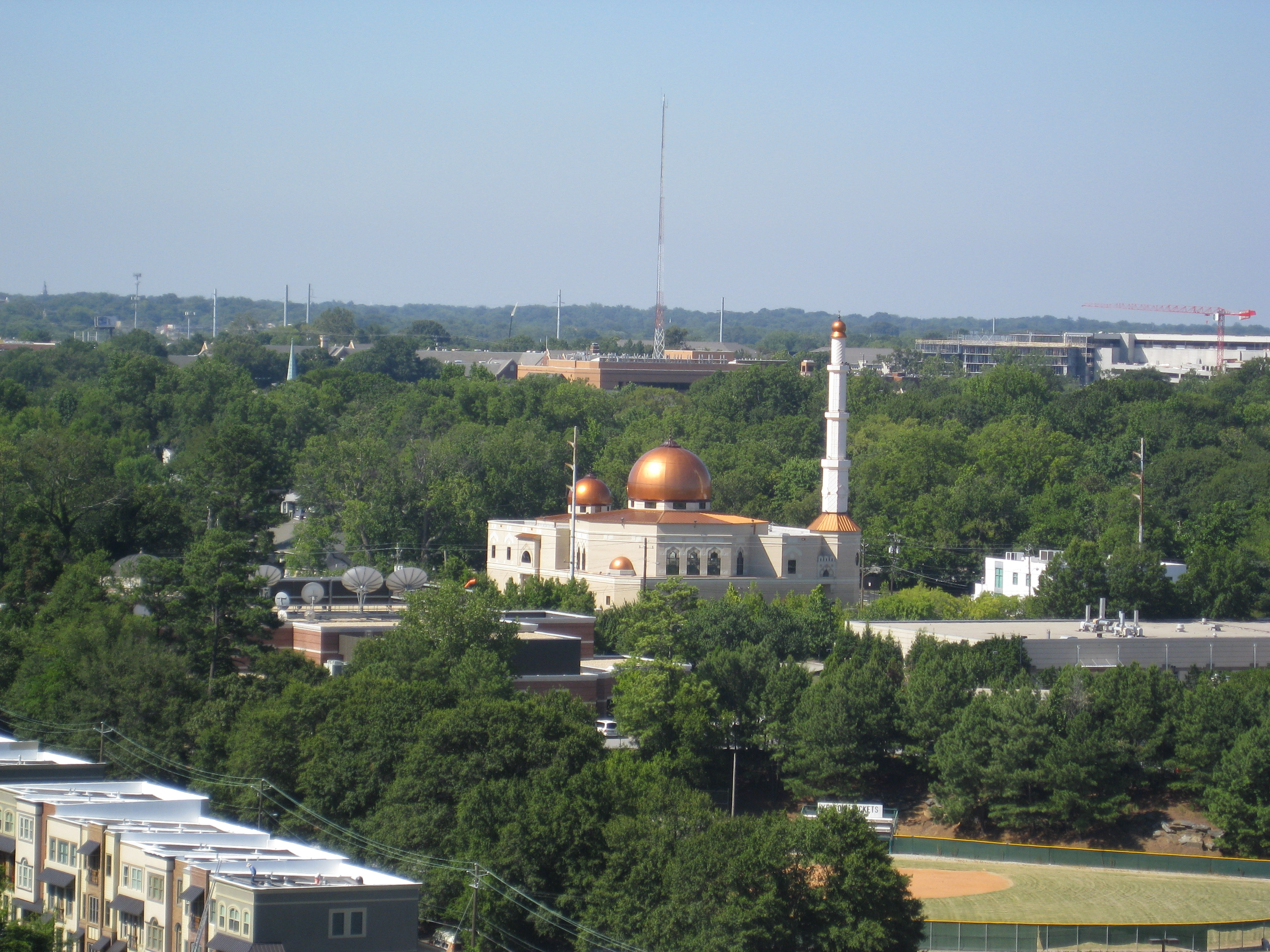
Al-Farooq Masjid mosque in Midtown Atlanta

== Jesus Junction ==
In local popular culture, Jesus Junction is the nickname for the intersection of Peachtree Street, East Wesley Road and West Wesley Road in the Buckhead area of the city, at which three churches are located.

The churches at the intersection are:

- Cathedral of Christ the King (Roman Catholic), mother church of the Catholic Archdiocese of Atlanta, on the southeast corner
- Second Ponce de Leon Baptist Church, at the northeast corner
- Cathedral of St. Philip (Episcopal), just north of the intersection where Peachtree Road bends to the east
