= Dock J. Jordan =

American lawyer, writer and politician (1866–1943)

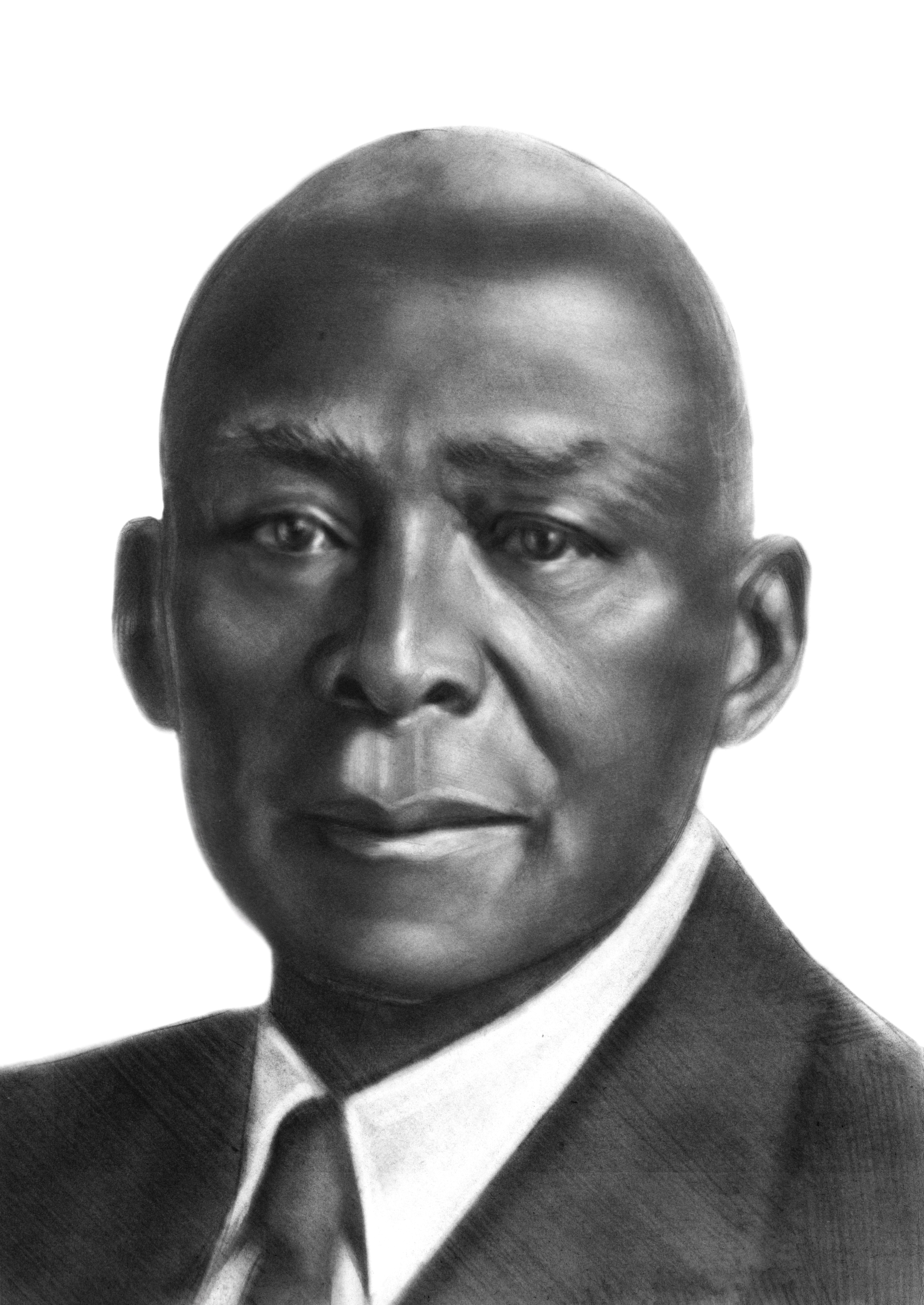
- Professor D. J. Jordan

Chairman of the Department of History at North Carolina Central University
- In office 1918–1939
- Preceded by: Position established
- Succeeded by: Joseph H. Taylor

Dean of History and Pedagogy at North Carolina Agricultural and Technical State University
- In office 1912–1918

President of Kittrell College
- In office 1909–1912
- Preceded by: John Leonidas Wheeler
- Succeeded by: Cadd Grant O'Kelly

Principal of Gray Street School
- In office 1905–1909

Vice President of Morris Brown College
- In office 1898–1905

6th President of Edward Waters University
- In office 1895–1897
- Preceded by: John R. Scott Sr.
- Succeeded by: J. P. O. Wallace

Personal details
- Born: Dock Jackson Jordan; October 18, 1866 Cuthbert, Georgia, U.S.
- Died: October 20, 1943 (aged 77) Durham, North Carolina, U.S.
- Spouse: Carrie Thomas Jordan

Dock J. Jordan
- Education: Allen University; Columbia University
- Known for: An Appeal to President Woodrow Wilson; The Voice of the Negro; The Colored American Magazine; Indianapolis Freeman; New Journal and Guide; Baltimore Afro-American; A.M.E. Church Review; Atlanta Journal-Constitution
- Scientific career
- Fields: Law, English, civil rights, history, education, Latin, mathematics, science, university administration
- Workplaces: Morris Brown College, Edward Waters College, Clark Atlanta University, Kittrell College, North Carolina Agricultural and Technical State University, North Carolina Central University

Dock Jackson Jordan (October 18, 1866 – October 20, 1943) was an American lawyer, author, politician, educator, historian and civil rights activist. On July 14, 1917, a letter that Jordan wrote criticizing President Woodrow Wilson's segregationist policies and condemning the administration for the East St. Louis Riot was published in the Raleigh Independent. The letter was subsequently published in many African-American newspapers and caused North Carolina governor Thomas Bickett to fear increased anger among African-Americans. He asked United States Attorney General Thomas Watt Gregory to investigate Jordan, and proceeded to carry out a campaign of harassment and intimidation of prominent black leaders in the state who did not denounce the educator's remarks.

== Early life ==
Dock Jackson Jordan, who was of African American heritage, was born October 18, 1866, in Cuthbert, Georgia to the Rev. Giles Dolphus Jordan and Julia Elmira White Jordan. Giles Jordan was born a slave in 1840 in South Carolina and died in 1898 in Early County, Georgia. On June 24, 1867, he registered to vote in Randolph County, Georgia; two years after his emancipation from slavery. He was a slave on the Westmoreland Plantation in Spartanburg, South Carolina. The elder Jordan was a Circuit Rider and 25-year veteran A.M.E. minister. He was appointed pastor of Wesley Chapel A.M.E. Church in Blakely, Georgia by Bishop Thomas Marcus Decatur Ward in 1875.

Julia White Jordan was born a slave in August 1847 and died on December 2, 1933, in Blakely, Georgia. According to her descendants and as evidenced by the success of her children, education was important to Julia. She ensured that each of her eight children attended school.

== Education ==
He graduated in 1892 from Allen University in Columbia, South Carolina with a B.S. and an LL.B. degree and was admitted to practice law by the South Carolina Supreme Court in May 1892. In 1900, the M.S. degree was bestowed upon him by Allen. After moving to Atlanta, Georgia, he was admitted to practice in that state. According to records held by Columbia University, Jordan furthered his education and received his B.S. in 1925 and his A.M. in 1928 from Teachers College at Columbia University.

== Career ==
Professor D. J. Jordan joined the faculty of Morris Brown College in Atlanta in 1893, and while there, served as Professor of Science and Dean of Law before accepting the position of President of Edward Waters University in Jacksonville Florida in November 1895. Also in 1893, he was a Republican nominee for the state legislature in Randolph County, Georgia and in 1894, a delegate to the state convention. At the state convention in 1894, Professor Jordan gave a 10-minute speech that aided in defeating white supremacist Thomas E. Watson as a candidate for Governor of Georgia. He was elected as a lay delegate to the A.M.E. Church in 1896, 1904, and 1912.

In 1897, he returned to Morris Brown as Professor of Literature where he remained until 1898, when he was appointed Vice President of the institution and Professor of Mathematics. He taught a semester at Atlanta University in 1901. From 1905 until 1909, he served as Principal of Gray Street School, one of the first schools established specifically for use by African-Americans in Atlanta, and was president of Georgia's Association of Colored Teachers. On December 31, 1895, he married Carrie Thomas Jordan, a pioneer Jeanes Supervisor in Durham, North Carolina and principal in Atlanta.

At the turn of the century, D. J. Jordan joined with W.E.B. Du Bois and others to write "An Appeal for the Colored Schools in the State Georgia," which was addressed in a memorial before the Georgia Legislature and printed in the Colored American Magazine in February 1901. Their appeal was an effort to defeat the "Bell Bill," a piece of legislation that would have closed one-half to two-thirds of black public schools in the state. They highlighted the glaring disparities between black and white schools, and used data to enhance their argument. This strategy was later used in the Brown v. Board of Education case of 1954. The appeal stated that while black public schools occupied only fifteen percent of public property, black children made up the population by more than forty-eight percent. DuBois and Jordan found that for every dollar Georgia spent on schools, white children got eighty cents and black children twenty cents. The appeal stated in part "Moreover, such propositions are thoroughly undemocratic and dangerous; if only Negro taxes are to go to Negro schools, is not this an entering wedge for further discrimination?"

Other authors of the appeal included educators John Hope (educator), John W. E. Bowen Sr. and William H. Crogman, physician Henry Rutherford Butler, minister Henry H. Proctor and L. B. Maxwell.

== Kittrell College and letter to Woodrow Wilson ==
In 1909, Professor D. J. Jordan moved his family to Kittrell, North Carolina to accept the presidency of Kittrell College. His daughter, Alice Julia Jordan was born on the campus. In 1912 he moved to Greensboro, North Carolina to serve as dean of History and Pedagogy at North Carolina Agricultural and Technical College (now North Carolina Agricultural and Technical State University). He was also director of the National Teacher's Training School and established numerous training workshops in other states for black educators. In 1915, Jordan was profiled in Who's Who Of The Colored Race, which referred to him as "one of the best writers and speakers of the race." By this time, he had distinguished himself as a prolific writer, commencement speaker and public intellectual. He contributed his articles to such publications as The Voice of the Negro, The Colored American Magazine, Indianapolis Freeman, Baltimore Afro-American, A.M.E. Church Review, Atlanta Journal-Constitution, New Journal and Guide, Raleigh Independent and countless others.

On July 14, 1917, the Independent, then owned by black leader Charles N. Hunter, published a letter from Jordan to President Woodrow Wilson, speaking out against his segregationist policies and condemning the administration for the East St. Louis Riot. Jordan, who accused Wilson of ignoring the plight of blacks and showing "more disregard of the feelings and rights of Negro Americans since James Buchanan," believed that African-Americans should not be asked to give their lives in World War I, when they were subject to race massacres and mass violence at home. He believed the president "did not regard the Negro as human." Jordan's letter was re-published in black newspapers throughout America and attracted nationwide attention. Whites dismissed the letter as "foolish, yet treasonable, dangerous and full of dynamite," according to the book Charles N. Hunter and Race Relations in North Carolina.

North Carolina Governor Thomas Bickett sent Jordan's letter to the FBI, and chastised Hunter for publishing it in "grand style." He asked Agricultural and Technical College President James B. Dudley to fire Jordan and repudiate his remarks. Many white newspapers excoriated the professor, and threatened that state appropriations would be withheld from Dudley's school unless Jordan was punished. He remained on the school's faculty until 1918. Nearly 50 years would pass before the accommodationist attitudes of North Carolina's black elite were replaced by more radicalized factions in step with the views of Jordan and social activists such as newspaper publisher Louis Austin.

== North Carolina College ==
Since 1914 Jordan had served simultaneously as an administrator at North Carolina Agricultural and Technical College and as a professor at the National Religious Training School and Chautauqua for the Colored Race. In 1918, he became head of the Department and Professor of History at what is now North Carolina Central University, and was the only history professor listed at the school until 1939. Jordan also taught English and Government at NCC until his retirement in 1941. Jordan's home, The Dock J. Jordan House was located on the campus at the corner of Lawson and Fayetteville Streets until it was demolished in 1965.

== Death ==
Dock Jackson Jordan died on October 20, 1943, and is buried in Durham's Beechwood Cemetery. He was the father of six children: Alice Julia Jordan, Lawrence Jordan, prominent A.M.E. Bishop Frederick Douglass Jordan, Julian Jordan, Frances Marie Jordan and Edwin Adolphis Jordan.

== Legacy ==
On October 18, 2021, Durham, North Carolina Mayor Steve Schewel declared Dock and Carrie Jordan Day in the city. The effort to recognize the couple was led by Council Member Pierce Freelon.

On September 6, 2022, the Durham City Council unanimously voted to adopt a resolution designating a section of Fayetteville Street from Lawson Street to Timothy Avenue as Dr. Dock J. Jordan and Carrie Thomas Jordan Highway.

On April 6, 2023, the North Carolina Department of Transportation's Board of Transportation formally adopted a resolution naming State Road 1118 in honor of the couple.
