= Carrie Thomas Jordan =

American educator and civil rights activist

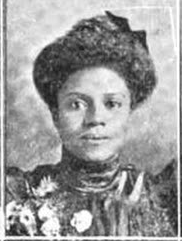
Carrie Thomas Jordan, from a 1902 publication.

Carrie Thomas Jordan (November 27, 1870 – August 11, 1968) was an American educator and civil rights activist.

== Early life ==
Carrie J. Thomas spent her formative years in Jacksonville, Florida as the eldest of 11 children born to Lawrence Thomas and Mary Green Tinsley Thomas. Her father was a preacher who pastored Mount Zion AME Church (Jacksonville, Florida). He also co-founded Morris Brown College and led Big Bethel AME Church in Atlanta. Carrie graduated from Morris Brown College in 1889. She also attended Clark College, from 1886 to 1890.

== Career ==
In 1902, Carrie Thomas Jordan was a speaker at the Negro Young People's Christian and Educational Congress, held in Atlanta. She advocated vocational training courses for African-American youth in the South, to improve their employment opportunities.

From 1923 to 1926, Carrie Jordan was a "Jeanes supervisor", mentoring and supporting rural schoolteachers in Durham, North Carolina under the auspices of the Jeanes Foundation. While in Durham, she also raised money from the Rosenwald Foundation to build twelve schools for African-American students in the Durham area. "We found many of the school houses in such poor condition that they were really unfit for use, and efforts were made to replace some of the worst ones with new buildings," Jordan wrote in her report on Durham's schools; she also started a county-wide commencement ceremony for black graduates.

== Personal life ==
In 1895 Carrie Thomas married professor Dock Jackson Jordan, later president of Edward Waters College and Kittrell College. They had six children. She was widowed when Dock died in 1943. Their son Frederick Douglass Jordan became a bishop in the AME Church. Carrie Thomas Jordan died in 1968, aged 97 years, and her remains were buried in Durham's Beechwood Cemetery.

A scholarship named for Carrie Thomas Jordan was established in 1993 at Clark Atlanta University, endowed by her daughter Alice Julia Jordan's estate.

== Legacy ==
On October 18, 2021, Durham, North Carolina Mayor Steve Schewel declared Dock and Carrie Jordan Day in the city. The effort to recognize the couple was led by Council Member Pierce Freelon.

On September 6, 2022, the Durham City Council unanimously voted to adopt a resolution designating a section of Fayetteville Street from Lawson Street to Timothy Avenue as Dr. Dock J. Jordan and Carrie Thomas Jordan Highway.

On April 6, 2023, the North Carolina Department of Transportation's Board of Transportation formally adopted a resolution naming State Road 1118 in honor of the couple.
