= Heaven Bound =

Heaven Bound or Heavenbound may refer to:

== Music ==
- "Heaven Bound", a 1998 song by Shana
- "Heaven Bound (I'm Ready)", a song written by Dennis Linde and recorded by the Oak Ridge Boys in 1991
- "Heavenbound", a 1989 song by DC Talk from DC Talk
- Heavenbound (album), a 2000 album by Scarub

== Other ==
- Heaven Bound (play), a morality play staged annually at the Big Bethel AME Church in Atlanta, Georgia.
