= Richard Henry Singleton =

American minister, activist (1865–1923)

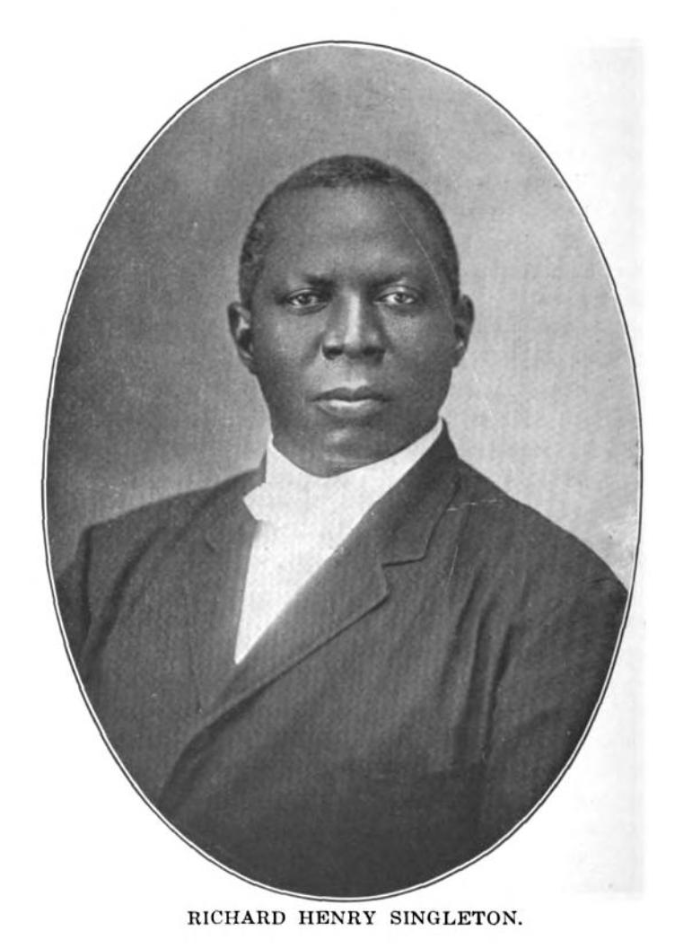
- Rev. Richard Henry Singleton
- Born: September 11, 1865; Hilton Head Island, South Carolina, U.S.
- Died: November 1923; Atlanta, Georgia, U.S.
- Other names: R. H. Singleton
- Education: Giles Academy, Turner Theological Seminary, Morris Brown College (DD)
- Occupation(s): Pastor, activist

Rev. Richard Henry Singleton (September 11, 1865 – November 1923), also known as R. H. Singleton, was an American pastor and activist. He led the Big Bethel AME Church in Atlanta, Georgia. He was trustee of Morris Brown University and president of the local chapter of the NAACP.

== Life and career ==
Richard Henry Singleton was born on September 11, 1865, in Hilton Head, South Carolina. His parents were Celia (née Kettles) and Richard Singleton, they were farmers and had been enslaved just prior to his birth and the start of the reconstruction era. Singleton attended public school, and Giles Academy on Hilton Head Island.

He graduated from Turner Theological Seminary (now part of the Interdenominational Theological Center) in Atlanta; and from Morris Brown College, where he received a doctor of divinity degree.

He began his service to the church in 1893, and started at Big Bethel in 1916. In 1919 he was selected to represent "his church and his race" at the Paris Peace Conference, one of a group of ten American blacks who would confer with President Woodrow Wilson and his conferees over the future of the German colonies in Africa (roughly present day Cameroon, Tanzania, Rwanda, Burundi, Namibia and Togo).

Singleton spoke at the 1921 opening of Joyland Park, Atlanta's first amusement park for blacks.

Singleton died in November 1923, in Atlanta.
