= Little Company of Mary Hospital (Evergreen Park) =

OSF Little Company of Mary Medical Center
- OSF HealthCare

Geography
- Location: Evergreen Park, Illinois, United States
- Coordinates: 41.72145°N 87.69294°W

Organization
- Care system: Private
- Type: Community
- Affiliated university: None

History
- Founded: 1930

Links
- Website: www.lcmh.org
- Lists: Hospitals in Illinois

OSF Little Company of Mary Medical Center is a hospital in Evergreen Park, Illinois.

== History ==
The hospital was founded on January 19, 1930, by the Sisters of the Little Company of Mary and serves much of the southwest side of Chicago.

In the early 20th century, the hospital—which was then segregated—refused to allow Dr. Arthur Falls Sr. to perform surgery on Dorothy Day, which both she and Falls protested. The hospital eventually relented, though on paper listed Falls as an assisting surgeon to a White physician.

The first-ever kidney transplant was performed in Little Company of Mary Hospital in 1950 on a 44-year-old woman who had polycystic kidney disease.

On October 17, 2019, OSF HealthCare signed a merger agreement with Little Company of Mary Hospital. The merger took place on February 1, 2020.

== Deaths ==
- Mahalia Jackson (1911–1972).
