= Joyland, Atlanta =

Joyland
- Neighborhoods of Atlanta
- Location of Joyland within central Atlanta
- Coordinates: 33.711998°N 84.396436°W
- Country: United States
- State: Georgia
- County: Fulton County
- City: City of Atlanta
- NPU: Y
- ZIP Code: 30315

Joyland is a neighborhood of small, single family homes in southeast Atlanta, Georgia and site of a former 1921 amusement park built for African Americans.

It is bordered by the Downtown Connector (I-75/I-85) freeway on the west, High Point on the north, Pryor Avenue and The Villages at Carver on the east, and Amal Heights on the south.

== History ==
On May 16, 1921, Joyland Park, an amusement park for African Americans was opened in the area, according to its ads in the Atlanta Independent at the time, "the only shady park" where African Americans "could enjoy themselves". At the opening a number of prominent Atlantans spoke:

- Mayor James Key
- Big Bethel AME Church pastor Rev. Dr. Richard Henry Singleton
- Wheat Street Baptist Church pastor Rev. Dr. P. James Bryant
- Jessie O. Thomas, founder of the Atlanta University School of Social Work and first director of the Southern Field Division of the National Urban League
- Prominent black physician and founding member of the Atlanta NAACP chapter Dr. William F. Penn

In 1926 a subdivision for African Americans, also called Joyland Park, was built here. Residents included farmers, farmhands and laborers. Lots were around 4,000 square feet (370 m^{2}) in size.

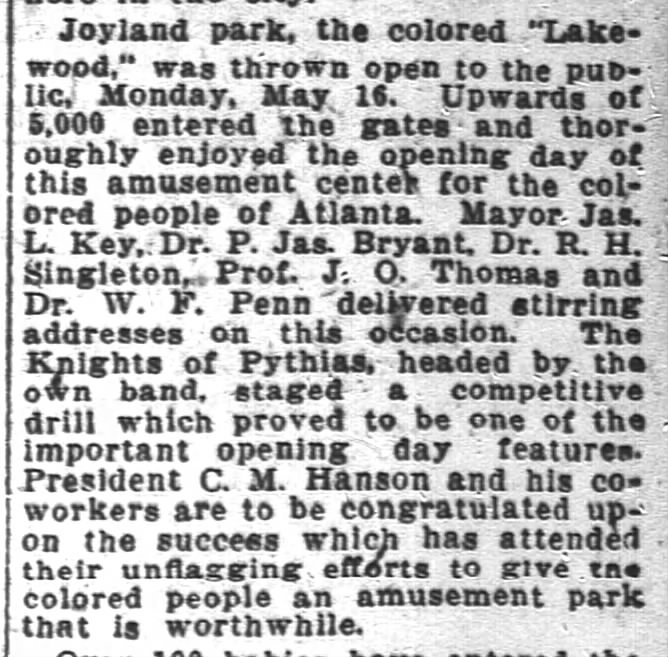
Atlanta Constitution article reporting the opening of the amusement park

Later the Joyland Park public housing project was built in the area.

== Government ==
The neighborhood is part of NPU Y.

== Parks ==
Joyland Park at the center of the neighborhood was renamed Arthur Langford Park in 1995, in honor of city councilman, Georgia state senator (1984–1994) and minister Arthur Langford, Jr. Joyland also has a street named after him, Arthur Langford, Jr. Place.
