= Joyland Park =

Joyland Park can mean:

- Joyland (Atlanta), a neighborhood of Atlanta, Georgia, site of Joyland amusement park
- Joyland Amusement Park (Wichita)
