= William F. Penn =

American physician

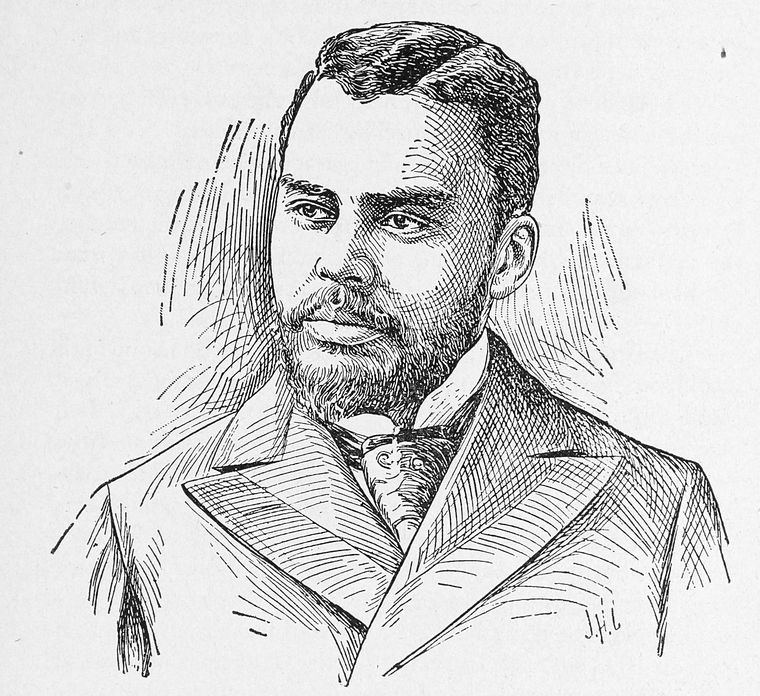
- William Penn
- Born: January 16, 1871
- Died: May 31, 1934 (aged 63)
- Occupation: Physician
- Known for: Founding member of the National Association for the Advancement of Colored People

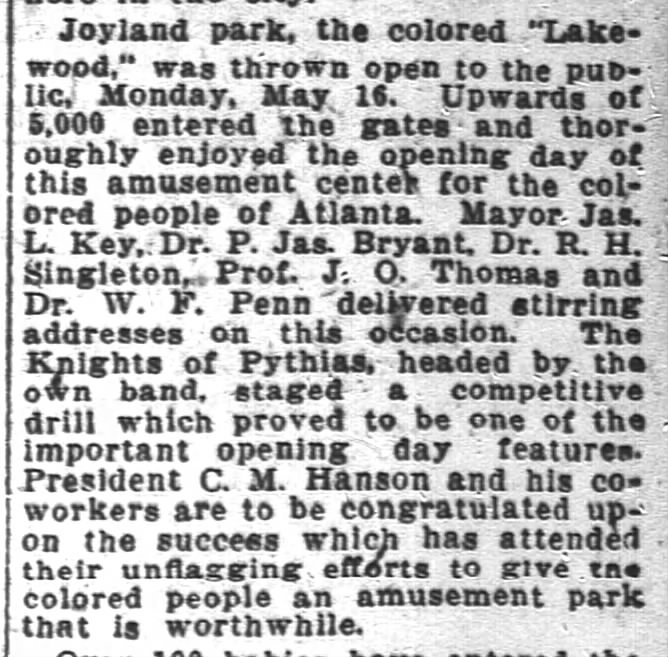
Mentioned as speaking at opening of Joyland Park

William Fletcher Penn (January 16, 1871 in New Glasgow, Amherst County, Virginia – May 31, 1934) was a prominent Black-American medical doctor in Atlanta, Georgia and a founding member of the Atlanta Chapter of the National Association for the Advancement of Colored People (NAACP).

As a child Penn attended public schools in Lynchburg, Virginia and then Hampton Institute and Virginia Normal and Industrial School (now Virginia State University). He first attended medical school at Leonard Medical School for Blacks (now Shaw University) in Raleigh, North Carolina before being invited to attend Yale Medical School in 1893. He graduated in 1897, the first Black-American to do so, as well as the first Black-American to head the university yearbook.

In 1898 he met and later married Lula Tompkins, taking her son, Louis T. Wright, as his step-son. Penn had a significant influence on Wright, who also pursued a career in medicine, graduating fourth in his class at Harvard Medical School and serving as the first Black-American surgeon on staff at the Harlem Hospital.

Penn was a founding member of the Atlanta chapter of the NAACP in 1917, a national organization for which his stepson Louis would later serve as chairman.

He is mentioned as a speaker at a meeting of city leaders in the aftermath of the Atlanta Race Riot in 1906, and in 1921 at the opening of Joyland, the first amusement park opened for blacks in Atlanta.
