= P. James Bryant =

Rev. Peter James Bryant was an American minister. He was pastor of Wheat Street Baptist Church in Atlanta, Georgia from 1898 to 1929.

Rev. Bryant spoke at the 1921 opening of Joyland Park, Atlanta's first amusement park for African Americans.
