= Pee Wee Kirkland =

American streetball player and alleged drug trafficker (born 1945)

Personal information
- Born: May 6, 1945 (age 81) Manhattan, New York, U.S.
- Listed height: 6 ft 2 in (1.88 m)
- Listed weight: 180 lb (82 kg)

Career information
- High school: Charles Evans Hughes (Manhattan, New York)
- College: Kittrell (1963–1964); Norfolk State (1967–1968)
- NBA draft: 1969: 13th round, 172nd overall pick
- Drafted by: Chicago Bulls
- Position: Guard
- Stats at Basketball Reference

Richard "Pee Wee" Kirkland (born May 6, 1945) is an American streetball player. He was named in ESPN's "Elite 24: Rucker Park legends".

== Career ==
=== Basketball ===
Born in Manhattan, New York, Kirkland played varsity basketball at Charles Evans Hughes High School in Manhattan, New York, and was made an All-City guard. He was awarded a scholarship and attended Kittrell College, a community college in North Carolina, and was on the basketball team, averaging 41 points per game. He then attended Norfolk State University and played on the basketball team, teaming up with future NBA star Bob Dandridge. The Spartans won the CIAA title in 1968 with a 25–2 record; they lost in the second round of the NCAA Division II Men's Tournament. The next year their record was 21–4, and they lost in the first round of the D-II tournament.

=== Draft and arrest ===
In 1969 he was drafted by the Chicago Bulls with the fourth pick in the thirteenth round. It is speculated that he turned the offer down because he was making more money in current ventures, including being a drug dealer, than he would in professional basketball. At the time, the opportunities offered to him outside of the NBA were far more lucrative, in terms of financial gain and public recognition. In 1971, he was arrested for tax evasion and conspiracy to sell narcotics, and served 11 years in prison.

=== Motivational speaker ===
He presents his messages in the "School of Skillz"—a basketball and life skills campaign that is co-sponsored by Nike. The camps began in the 1990s on Saturdays in Harlem and have since become a nationwide endeavor. He has won championships as a high school coach at The Dwight School, a prestigious private school on the Upper West Side in New York City. One of his early breakthroughs involved reaching out to youth such as Hanif "Camel" Warren. As an educator and social worker, Kirkland utilizes the respect he receives from young people because of his gangster past to reach at-risk youth and break down their misconceptions about "keepin' it real" on the streets.

Kirkland earned a master's degree in human services from Lincoln University.

== In popular culture ==
In the 1994 film Above the Rim, Kirkland appeared as Georgetown recruiter Phil Redd.

Ja Rule mentions Kirkland as "Kirkland Pee Wee" in his 2001 song "Always On Time" featuring Ashanti.

Kirkland is referenced in the 2002 Clipse single, "Grindin", and appears in the track's music video.

In 2012, he appeared in a documentary titled Doin' It in the Park, directed by Bobbito Garcia and Kevin Couliao.

Late rapper Young Dolph refers to PeeWee Kirkland as a "legend" during his feature on Curren$y's 2019 song "All Work".
