= Lillian Steele Proctor =

American social worker

- Born: 1899; Atlanta
- Died: April 3, 1988 (aged 88–89)
- Education: Fisk University; University of Chicago; New York School of Social Work
- Employer: Cook County Bureau of Welfare
- Known for: Social worker
- Spouse: Arthur Falls
- Parent(s): Henry H. Proctor; Adeline L. Davis Proctor

Lillian Steele Proctor Falls (1899-April 3, 1988) was a social worker. Her master's work studying gifted African American children was pioneering in the field. She later became the first African American supervisor of social work in Chicago.

== Biography ==
Lillian Steele Proctor was born in 1899 to a prominent African-American Atlanta family. Her father, Reverend Henry H. Proctor was a Congregationalist pastor. Her mother, Adeline L. Davis Proctor founded Atlanta's first public kindergarten. Proctor was one of five children. After the 1906 Atlanta race massacre, Reverend Proctor worked to ease communal tensions.

As there was no public high school for African Americans in Atlanta, the Proctors paid tuition for their children to attend the high school at Atlanta University. Lillian Proctor attended Fisk University. In 1920, when Lillian was a senior at Fisk, the Proctor family moved to Brooklyn. Lillian worked at the National Urban League, which gave her a scholarship to study at the University of Chicago where she earned her master's degree while working at the United Charities of Chicago, a white organization for social work. Proctor and two other African-Americans received the top three scores on the exam for assistant superintendent of the county Bureau of Welfare. However, the test was invalidated, so she was offered a less prestigious position.

Lillian won a scholarship through the Commonwealth Fund to study at the New York School of Social Work, so she took a year's leave of absence from the United Charities of Chicago. but was the only student in her class who was not placed. She worked for the Urban League of New York.

While in Chicago, Proctor met Arthur Falls. The couple dated for seven and a half years, with several separations due to Proctor's schooling. The couple married on December 6, 1928, in the Proctor family home, though the Proctors were unhappy that their daughter was marrying a Catholic. The next year, Falls had a son, Arthur Falls Jr. The couple also had a Catholic wedding that year. Lillian Proctor continued to use her maiden last name for professional purposes.

Proctor moved to Washington, DC, where she worked in the research department of the segregated public school district. She worked with mentally and developmentally challenged African American children. Proctor became interested in intellectually gifted African American students, which became the topic of her master's thesis. She had to fight her advisor to be allowed to pursue the field. She included results from intelligence tests, from additional assessments, and medical characteristics in her research. She also considered the communal characteristics and racial discrimination of society and the school system. The qualitative nature of her work was unique in the psychological field. In 1929, Proctor completed her master's dissertation, "A Case Study of Thirty Superior Colored Children in Washington, DC." It was the first extensive study of gifted African-American children. Proctor was one of the first scholars to discuss how gifted children perceived racial awareness and racial issues.

In 1929, Proctor returned to Chicago. She became the first African American social worker with the United Charities of Chicago. The United Charities of Chicago asked her to be the acting superintendent of a district during the absence of its white superintendent. Proctor was the first African American woman in Chicago to hold such a position. She was a member of Alpha Kappa Alpha sorority.

In 1931, Proctor took a civil service examination and scored high. She became the supervisor of the Blind Relief Service in the Cook County Bureau of Public Welfare. She later became Chicago's first African-American supervisor of social work. She served as the district supervisor of the Cook County Bureau of Public Welfare. She and Arthur Falls continued to support the development of young African Americans.

Proctor was active in the Chicago community as well. She served as the Community Organization Department director of the Chicago Urban League, lending the position significant credibility. In the early 1950s, the Falls decided to integrate Western Springs, Illinois, leading to a drawn-out legal battle. They were met with violence multiple times, finally sitting on their porch with a shotgun after a friend was almost hit by a brick. They lived in Western Springs until Lillian died on April 3, 1988.
