= Dolores Cross =

American educator and university administrator (born 1938)

- Born: August 29, 1938 (age 88); Newark, New Jersey, U.S.

Academic background
- Education: Seton Hall University (BS); Hofstra University (MS); University of Michigan (PhD)

Academic work
- Institutions: Chicago State University; Morris Brown College

Dolores Evelyn Cross (born August 29, 1938) is an American educator and university administrator convicted of embezzlement. Cross became the first African-American woman to serve as president of Chicago State University in 1990 and the first female president of Morris Brown College from 1998 to 2002. During Cross's tenure as president, Morris Brown College lost its accreditation in December 2002 amid severe debt, allegations of financial fraud and the absence of a viable financial recovery plan. Following the loss of accreditation, Morris Brown College students became ineligible for federal financial aid and enrollment fell sharply. In 2006, Cross pleaded guilty in federal court to one count of embezzlement in connection with the misapplication of federal funds provided to Morris Brown College.

== Early life ==
Cross was born in Newark, New Jersey, and grew up in public housing there at James M. Baxter Terrace and Seth Boyden Terrace, before graduating from Central High School. A single mother, she took eight years before earning her Bachelor of Science in education from Seton Hall University in 1963, then obtained her Master of Science in education from Hofstra University and a Ph.D. in higher education from the University of Michigan in 1971. In 2001, Seton Hall awarded her an honorary Doctor of Humane Letters degree.

== Career ==
Cross served as vice chancellor for student affairs at City University of New York and the president of the New York State Higher Education Services Corporation before becoming the first female president of Chicago State University in 1990. Cross left Chicago State in 1997 to become president of the GE Fund, General Electric's corporate foundation.

=== President of Morris Brown College ===
When Cross arrived at Morris Brown College, it was financially troubled. While she was president, Morris Brown College obtained $3.4 million in federally insured student loans and Pell Grants for ineligible students, including some who never attended the college, some who were enrolled part time and others who had already left. The money was used to pay the school's operating costs.

In 2001, after learning that approximately 600 registered students had not completed enrollment and that the school would have to return approximately $3 million in student loan funds, Cross directed employees to enroll them, using the names and financial information of hundreds of students, prospective students and parents to obtain loans they had not authorized and from which they received no benefit.

In December 2002, the Southern Association of Colleges and Schools revoked Morris Brown's accreditation amid approximately $23 million in debt, allegations of financial fraud and the absence of a viable financial recovery plan. The loss of accreditation made students ineligible for federal financial aid. Enrollment, which had previously exceeded 2,700 students, fell to 72 by fall 2007.

In May 2006, Cross pleaded guilty to one count of embezzlement; 27 other charges were dismissed in exchange for her plea. In January 2007, Cross was sentenced to five years of probation and a year of home confinement, as well as 500 hours of community service, $13,942 in restitution and a fine of $3,000.
