= Morris Brown College =

Historically Black college in Atlanta, Georgia, US

- Former name: Morris Brown University
- Motto: To God and Truth
- Type: Private historically black liberal arts college
- Established: January 5, 1881; 145 years ago
- Religious affiliation: African Methodist Episcopal Church
- President: Kevin James
- Students: 432 (Fall 2024)
- Location: Atlanta, Georgia, U.S. 33.7548°N 84.4089°W
- Campus: Urban, 21 acres (8.5 ha)
- Colors: Purple and black
- Mascot: Wolverines and Lady Wolverines
- Website: morrisbrown.edu

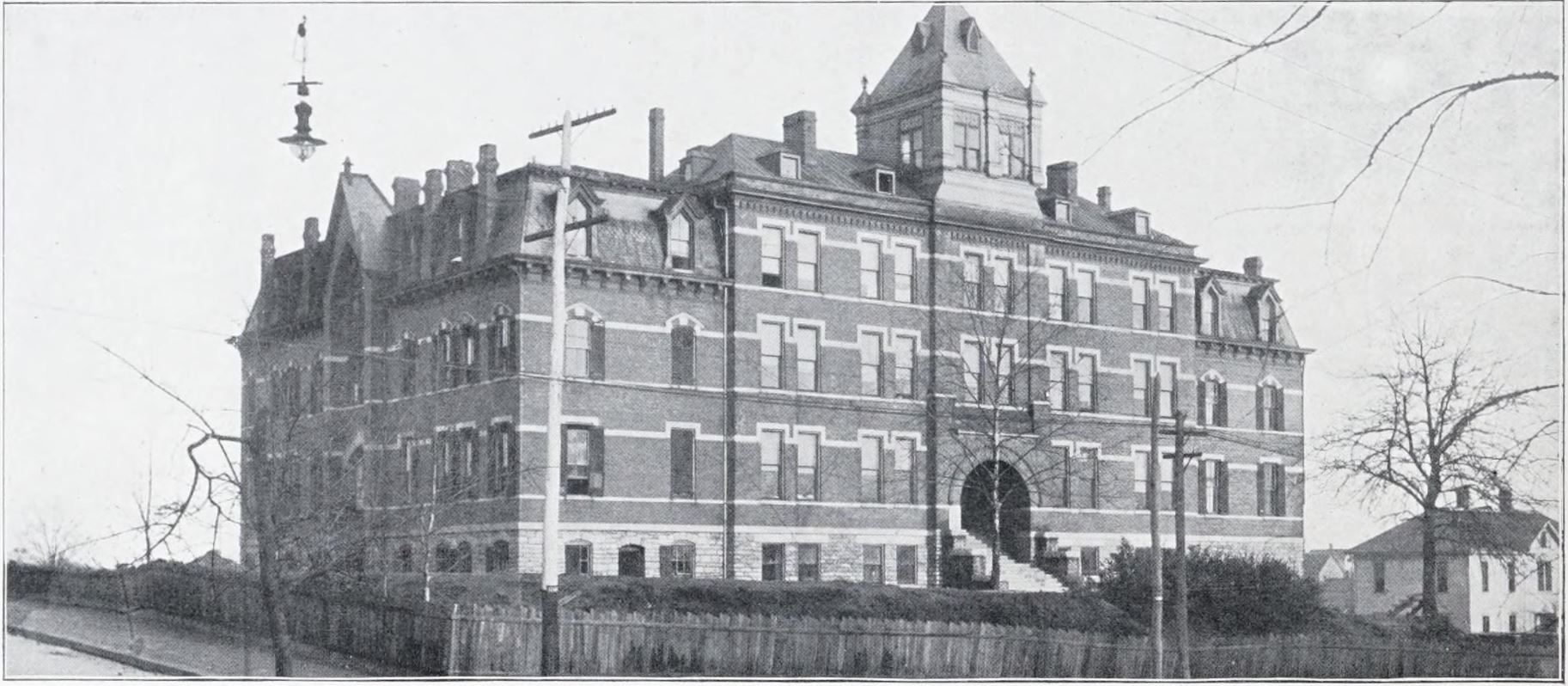
Original location of Morris Brown

Morris Brown College (MBC) is a private Methodist historically black liberal arts college in Atlanta, Georgia. Founded January 5, 1881, it is the first educational institution in Georgia to be owned and operated entirely by African-Americans.

The college was unaccredited from 2003 to 2022, but is currently accredited by the Transnational Association of Christian Colleges and Schools.

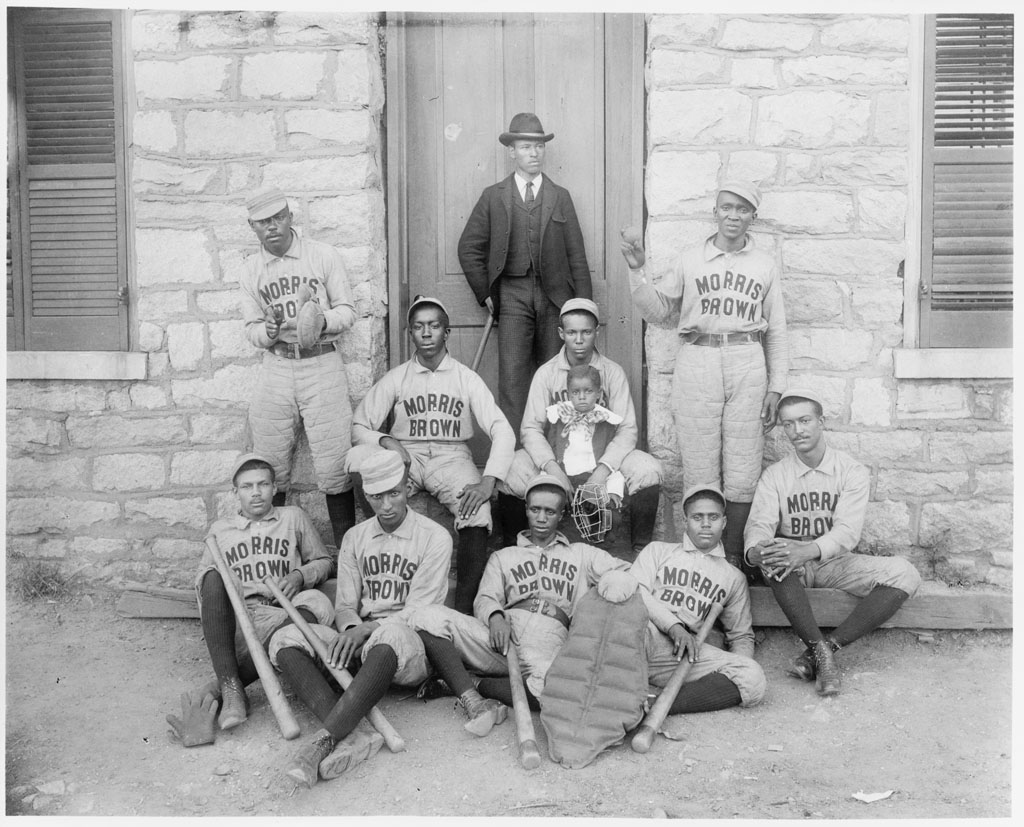
Baseball team in 1900

== History ==
=== Establishment ===
The Morris Brown College was founded on January 5, 1881, by African-Americans affiliated with the African Methodist Episcopal Church, the first independent black denomination in the United States. It was named to honor the denomination's second bishop, Morris Brown.

After the end of the American Civil war, the AME Church sent numerous missionaries to the South to found new churches. They planted many new AME congregations in Georgia and other states, where hundreds of thousands of freedmen joined this independent black denomination.

On January 5, 1881, the North Georgia Annual Conference of the AME Church passed a resolution to establish an educational institution in Atlanta for the moral, spiritual, and intellectual growth of Negro boys and girls. The school chartered and opened October 15, 1885, with 107 students and nine teachers.

The campus was initially on the east side of Atlanta, at the intersection of Boulevard and Houston Street (now John Wesley Dobbs Ave.). In 1922 the campus expanded, acquiring the land at the southeast corner of Boulevard and Irwin St. The college moved to its present location on the west side of Atlanta at the Atlanta University Center in 1932. The Boulevard site is now occupied by the Helene Mills Senior Center and the Mt. Zion Second Baptist Church.

Morris Brown was the first educational institution in Georgia to be owned and operated entirely by African-Americans. By 1898 the school had 14 faculty, 422 students, and 18 graduates. For more than a century, the college enrolled many students from poor backgrounds, large numbers of whom returned to their hometowns as teachers, as education was a mission of high priority.

Fountain Hall, originally known as Stone Hall when occupied by Atlanta University, was completed in 1882. After Atlanta University consolidated its facilities, it leased the building to Morris Brown College, which renamed it as Fountain Hall. It is closely associated with the history of Morris Brown College and has been designated as a National Historic Landmark.

In 1950, the President of Georgia Tech and civil rights lecturer Blake R Van Leer delivered the commencement address. Van Leer would later be involved in a local battle against a racist Governor at the time.

=== Embezzlement prosecution ===
By the early 2000s, Morris Brown College had become heavily reliant on federal financial aid to sustain its enrollment of 2,500 students. Approximately $8 million in federal funds was disbursed to the college annually. To qualify for these funds, the college was obligated to accurately report student enrollment figures to the Department of Education. However, a fraudulent scheme was orchestrated by former president Dolores Cross and financial aid director Parvesh Singh. They knowingly falsified enrollment data, inflating the number of students receiving financial aid. The millions of dollars fraudulently obtained were diverted from designated student accounts to cover the college's escalating operational costs, including payroll expenses. The misuse of federal funds led to the revocation of the college's accreditation by the Southern Association of Colleges and Schools in 2002. The loss of accreditation precipitated a financial crisis, ultimately forcing the college to the brink of closure.

Cross and Singh were subsequently indicted, convicted, and sentenced for their roles in the scheme. Their actions inflicted substantial damage to the college's reputation and left a lasting impact on the institution and its students.

=== Aftermath (2003–2019) ===
Once a thriving institution with approximately 2,500 students, Morris Brown College experienced a significant decline marked by financial mismanagement, accreditation loss, and legal challenges. The college's peak enrollment occurred before a series of scandals led to the resignation of its president and subsequent accreditation issues.

Despite attempts to revive the college, including the return of former president, Samuel D. Jolley in 2004 and a proposed enrollment goal of 107 students, Morris Brown struggled to regain its footing. The loss of accreditation proved catastrophic, cutting off vital federal and state financial aid and precipitating a steep enrollment drop. The college's financial woes deepened, culminating in a $13 million property bond default that threatened foreclosure on historic campus buildings.

To stave off closure, Morris Brown filed for bankruptcy in 2012. A lifeline emerged in 2014 when the city of Atlanta purchased the campus, relieving the college of a substantial debt burden. However, the deal did not reverse the college's academic decline. Enrollment plummeted to fewer than 50 students by 2018, hindered by the lack of accreditation and limited financial aid options.

Compounding the challenges, Morris Brown suffered severe building deterioration, including a fire at Gaines Hall. While the city expressed interest in preserving the historic campus architecture, the overall condition of the college continued to deteriorate. Despite efforts to regain accreditation, Morris Brown faced an uphill battle for survival.

=== "Hard reset" and reaccrediation (2019–present) ===
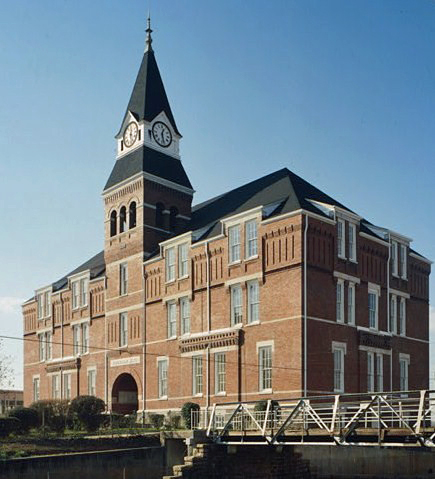
Fountain Hall in 1979

The board of trustees selected Kevin E. James to serve as interim president of the college in 2019. James came to Morris Brown after a 20-year career in higher education, serving as a senior-level administrator, with positions at Strayer University and Herzing University as a dean of academic affairs. James led the charge, calling the initiative "The Hard Reset".

Under James's leadership, Morris Brown was authorized as an institute of higher learning by the Georgia Nonpublic Postsecondary Education Commission (GNPEC) in 2019. The approval was a notable step towards regaining full accreditation. James was officially named president in 2020. He was also to raise millions of dollars for the school and establish lucrative partnerships to help further its growth. In 2021, the college became beneficiaries of a $30 million investment that partners them with Hilton to establish a new hotel on campus and reestablish a hospitality management degree program to train Brownites and its application for accreditation candidacy through the Transnational Association of Christian Colleges and Schools (TRACS) was approved, enabling the school to regain access to federal financial aid programs and Title IV funding.

As of April 2024, Morris Brown had an enrollment of 300+ students.

In 2024, James was offered and accepted a contract extension to retain his position until June 2029. However, he was abruptly fired as president on January 12, 2026. Nzinga Shaw briefly served as the interim president until January 21, 2026, when James was reinstated after the board determined the dismissal did not comply with his employment agreement.

=== Leaders ===
Founders

- Wesley John Gaines
- Steward Wylie

Principals

- Mary McGree, 1885–1886
- Alice D. Carey, 1886–1887
- E.W. Lee, 1887–1888

Presidents

- James Henderson, 1896–1904
- J.S. Flipper, 1904–1908
- E.W. Lee, 1908–1911
- W.A. Fountain, 1911–1920
- J.H. Lewis, 1920–1928
- William A. Fountain, 1928–1950
- Edward C. Mitchell (interim), 1950–1951
- John H. Lewis, 1951–1958
- Frank Cunningham, 1958–1965
- John A. Middleton, 1965–1973
- Robert Threatt, 1973–1984
- Calvert H. Smith, 1984–1992
- Gloria C. Anderson (interim), 1992–1993
- Samuel D. Jolley Jr., 1993–1998
- Gloria C. Anderson (interim), 1998
- Delores Cross, 1999–2002
- Charles E. Taylor, 2002–2003
- Samuel D. Jolley Jr. 2004–2006
- Stanley J. Pritchett, 2010–2018
- Kevin E. James, 2019–2026
- Nzinga Shaw (interim), 2026
- Kevin E. James, 2026

== Academics ==
Morris Brown offers the bachelor of arts and bachelor of science degrees. The Department of Business also offers four certificate programs.

=== Accreditation ===
Until 2003, Morris Brown was accredited by a regional accreditor, the Southern Association of Colleges and Schools (SACS). Morris Brown was unaccredited from 2003 to 2022.

In March 2019, the college's leaders announced that the college was applying for accreditation through the Transnational Association of Christian Colleges and Schools (TRACS). The college's application for candidacy was accepted by TRACS in early 2021, enabling the college to once again receive federal financial aid and other funding. On April 26, 2022, Morris Brown College was granted full accreditation. This is a rare example of a college regaining accreditation after nearly 20 years without it.

== Athletics ==
Morris Brown College's Herndon Stadium was the site of the field hockey competitions during the 1996 Summer Olympics. The stadium is designed to seat 15,000 spectators.

In the early 2000s, the college briefly had an independent NCAA Division I athletics program. Prior to the Division I transition, the college was a founding and active member of the NCAA Division II Southern Intercollegiate Athletic Conference between 1913 and 2001.

The Morris Brown Wolverines football program played at Herndon Stadium on campus until the athletic program was discontinued in 2003. Despite an inactive athletics program, Morris Brown has continued its homecoming tradition every fall semester on campus.

== Marching Wolverines ==
Morris Brown College was well known for its popular and sizable marching band program, "The Marching Wolverines", and danceline "Bubblin Brown Sugar." Both were strongly featured in the 2002 box office hit Drumline and invited to perform at the first Honda Battle of the Bands event in 2003. Due to the college's loss of accreditation, the band program was discontinued in 2002.

In 2006, the rappers OutKast released a song named "Morris Brown" that featured the marching band.

In 2025, the college began a $5 million dollar fundraising campaign to restart the band.

== In popular culture ==
Morris Brown's campus has been used as a primary or partial filming location for various television shows and movies, including Drumline (2002), We Are Marshall (2006), and Stomp the Yard (2007).

== Notable alumni ==
Name	Class year	Reference	Notes
Kimberly Alexander		member of the Georgia House of Representatives	
George Atkinson		former NFL defensive back for the Oakland Raiders	
Robert "T-Mo" Barnett		rapper and member of Goodie Mob and Dungeon Family	
Solomon Brannan	1963	former AFL defensive back for the Kansas Chiefs and New York Jets	
Jean Carn		jazz and pop singer	
Charles W. Chappelle		aviation pioneer, international businessman, president of the African-American Union, electrical engineer and architect/construction	attended late 1880s
Donté Curry	2000	former NFL linebacker for Carolina Panthers and Detroit Lions	
Carl Wayne Gilliard		member of the Georgia House of Representatives	
Greg Grant		former NBA player	
Hilda Grayson Finney		educator, worked with Carter G. Woodson and Mary McLeod Bethune	
Tommy Hart		former NFL defensive end for the San Francisco 49ers	
Beverly Harvard	1973	first black female police chief of Atlanta and U.S. marshal	
Donzella James		former member of the Georgia State Senate	
Alfred Jenkins	1973	former NFL and WFL wide receiver for the Birmingham Americans 1974 and the Atlanta Falcons 1975–1983	
Ezra Johnson		former NFL defensive end for the Green Bay Packers and Indianapolis Colts	
Carrie Thomas Jordan	1889	educator	
NeNe Leakes		television personality and entrepreneur	attended 1986–1987
James Alan McPherson	1965	McArthur "genius grant" winner and Pulitzer Prize-winning author	
Howard Simon Mwikuta		former kicker for the Dallas Cowboys and the first native-born African to play in the NFL	
Billy Nicks		former head football coach of Morris Brown and Prairie View A&M University	
Richard Henry Singleton		African Methodist Episcopal minister, and activist; led the Big Bethel AME Church in Atlanta	
Sommore		comedian and member of the Queens of Comedy	
Hosea Williams		civil rights activist	
James E. Winfield	1967	civil rights attorney, city prosecutor, and politician in Vicksburg, Mississippi; former president of the National Alumni Association and the board of trustees of Morris Brown College	
