= Heaven Bound (play) =

American morality play

Heaven Bound is a morality play staged annually at the Big Bethel AME Church in Atlanta, Georgia.

The play debuted on February 17, 1930; as of 2019, it had been performed for 89 years, with the church claiming it to be the longest-running musical in North America.

It was co-written by Nellie Lindley Davis, a chorister at the church and teacher.
