= Arthur Falls =

African-American physician and activist based in Chicago

Doctor Arthur Grand Pre’ Falls
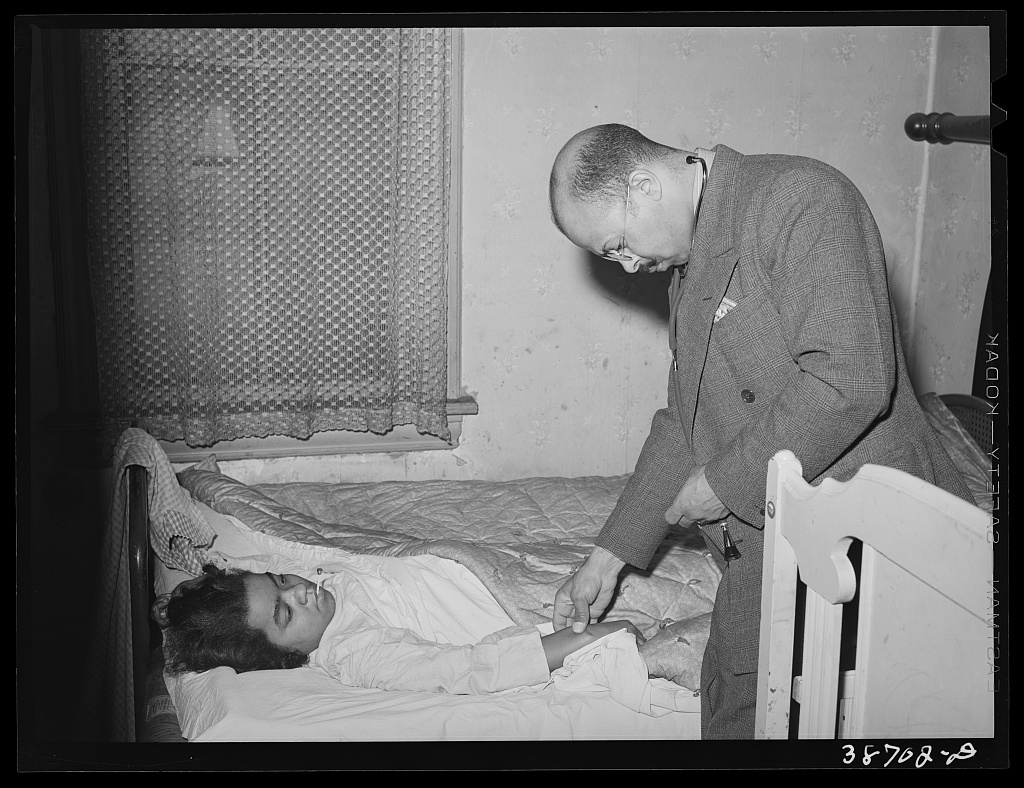
- Born: December 25, 1901; Chicago, Illinois, US
- Died: January 9, 2000 (aged 98); Kalamazoo County, Michigan, US
- Burial place: Queen of Heaven Cemetery, Chicago
- Education: Feinberg School of Medicine, Northwestern University
- Occupation: Physician
- Known for: Founding first Chicago Catholic Worker
- Spouse: Lillian Steele Proctor

Arthur Grand Pre’ Falls Sr. (December 25, 1901 – January 9, 2000) was an African-American physician and activist based in Chicago. He became in 1925 the founder of the city's first Catholic Worker.

A graduate of the medical school at Northwestern University, Falls would also play a major role in the desegregation of Chicago's medical facilities.

== Biography ==
=== Early life and education ===
Born to William Arthur and Angelina Santalia Degrandprie Falls in 1901, Arthur was raised Catholic in a Creole household. His father was a postman and his mother was a dressmaker. Falls attended public schools, however, as Catholic schools in the area did not accept black students. Their parish was Our Lady of Solace Catholic Church.

Falls attended the medical school at Northwestern University and gained his medical license in 1925. He opened a private practice near Provident Hospital, the only facility in the city that accepted black patients. Catholic hospitals at the time were also still segregated.

=== Activism and career ===
Falls was active with the Chicago Urban League as well as the Federated Colored Catholics, a Black Catholic advocacy group founded in 1925 by Dr Thomas Wyatt Turner, another African-American medical scholar and activist. After the FCC was taken over by a group of white Jesuits who turned it into the Catholic Interracial Council, Falls—who preferred the interracial focus as opposed to a black one—attempted to start a CIC chapter in Chicago without success.

Falls met Peter Maurin in 1934, which introduced him to the budding Catholic Worker Movement. He gained an interest and began communicating with Dorothy Day, whom he encouraged to found a Catholic Worker house in Chicago. (He also persuaded her to change the organisation's logo to include a black hand instead of two white ones.) His efforts led to a Chicago Catholic Worker school which began operations in 1936; unlike other Catholic worker houses, it did not focus on hospitality but rather education.

Around the same time, Falls began pressing the Chicago Archdiocese to end segregation in their front offices and medical facilities. He usually received no response and entered into a prolonged conflict with the archbishop, Cardinal Samuel Stritch, who advocated for a slower approach even as race riots ravaged the city.

Falls and his fellow Black physicians would file multiple lawsuits against the city's hospitals, which resulted in the eventual desegregation of not only the religiously affiliated institutions, but the secular as well, by 1964. These measures included accepting black patients as well as black physicians like Falls himself.

Falls, who did not align with the Catholic Worker movement and Dorothy Day on every point, did agree with them on the issue of pacifism and resistance, refusing to serve in World War II.

Falls did, however, battle with the local government in 1953, when, after he desegregated the all white suburb of Western Springs, the city attempted to claim his property via eminent domain (with the support of his racist neighbors). Falls sued to keep his property and won in court.

=== Death ===
Falls died in January 2000 at the age of 98, having lived for a time at a nursing home in Michigan. He was funeralized at St John of the Cross Catholic Church in Western Springs, his former neighborhood. The funeral was not well attended.

He is buried at Queen of Heaven Cemetery in Hillside, Illinois.

== Personal life ==
Falls was married to his wife Lillian until her death in 1988. They had one son, Arthur Jr.

== Legacy ==
Falls is said to have coined the term "the Mythical Body of Christ", which he described as a heresy involving the elevation of the white Catholic experience to that of a normative status, to the exclusion of all other ethnic groups.

A book on Falls' philosophy of racial justice was released in 2014 by Lincoln Rice. A dictated memoir from Falls is also extant.
