= William Holmes Borders =

American civil rights activist and pastor (1905–1993)

Reverend William Holmes Borders Sr.
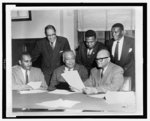
- Clarence Mitchell Jr. (seated, bottom left), Borders (seated, bottom center), and A.T. Walden (seated, bottom right), with 3 unknown standing men, 1950.
- Born: 24 February 1905
- Died: 23 November 1993 (aged 88)
- Years active: 1937–1988
- Movement: Civil Rights Movement
- Children: 1
- Relatives: Lisa Borders (granddaughter)

William Holmes Borders Sr. (24 February 1905 – 23 November 1993) was an American civil rights activist and leader and pastor of Wheat Street Baptist Church in Atlanta, Georgia from 1937 to 1988.

== Biography ==
Borders was born in Macon, Georgia on 24 February 1905 to Leila Birdstrong and James Buchanan Borders, a pastor for the Swift Creek Baptist Church. He attended Morehouse College, but could only afford to pay for two years. College president John Hope allowed him to graduate anyway on the condition he would pay in the future.

During bus desegregation in Atlanta, Borders sat in the front of a bus and was arrested. He formed the Wheat Street Credit Union to provide low-interest loans to blacks. Three times in the 1960s and 1970s, Borders ran for the Georgia House of Representatives but failed.

== Influence ==
Borders' influence in the black community was the trigger for a local radio station to offer him a weekly program in 1940. Listeners of both races tuned in to hear information about segregation and disfranchisement during World War II, and black migration to the north. The program became the second-highest-rated broadcast in Atlanta.

Borders had a significant influence on the life of Martin Luther King Jr. Borders's oral presentation and expression accompanied by bodily gesture and physical movement could be seen in the sermons of Dr. King.

== Personal life ==
Borders Sr. was the father of William Holmes Borders Jr. and the grandfather of Lisa Borders, member of the Atlanta City Council and one-time candidate for mayor of Atlanta in the 2009 election.
