= Al-Farooq Masjid =

Mosque in Atlanta, Georgia, United States

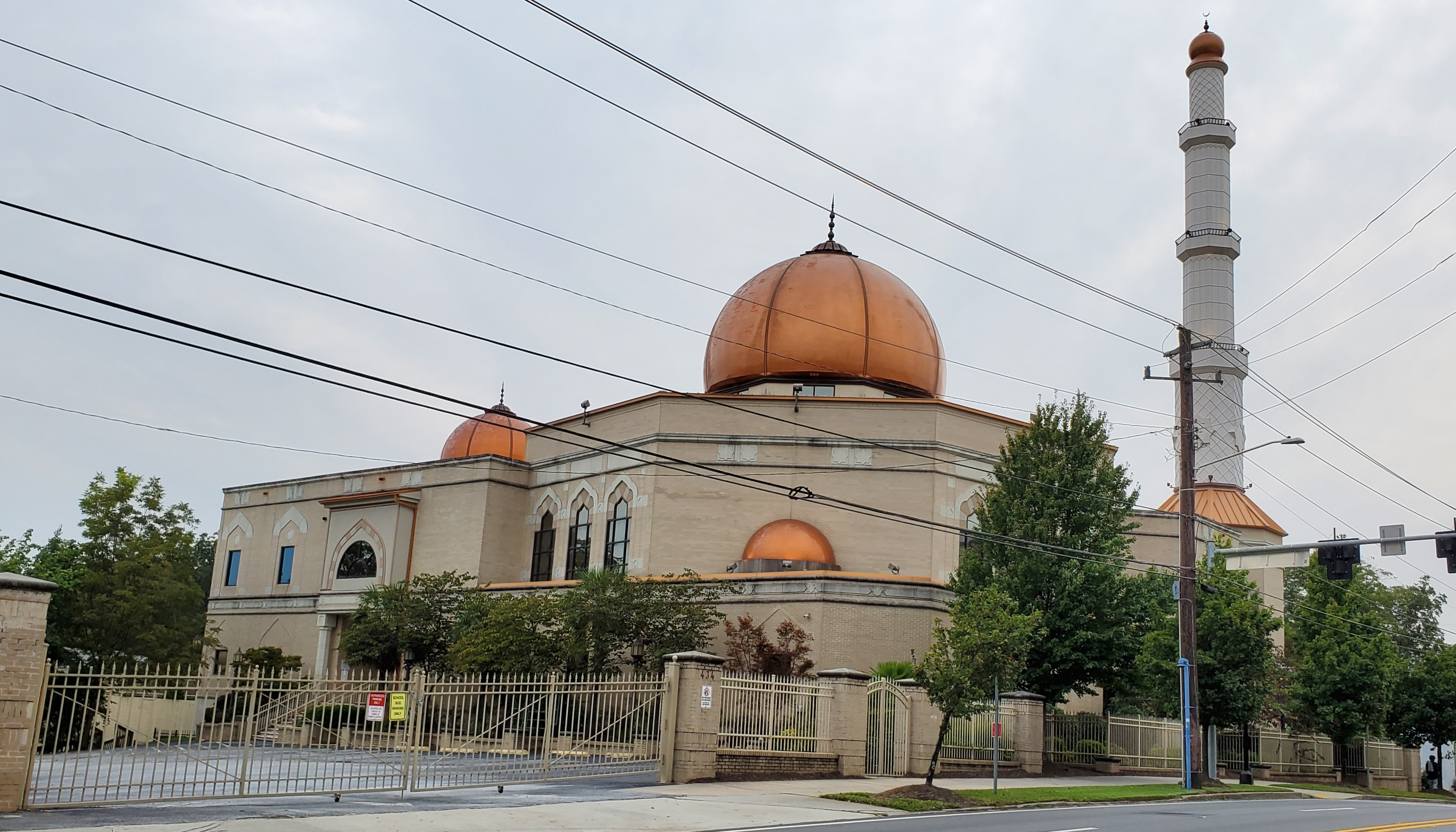
- Al-Farooq Masjid (2020)

- Location within Atlanta Location within Georgia Location within the United States

Religion
- Affiliation: Islam

Location
- Location: 442 14th Street; Atlanta
- State: Georgia
- Country: United States
- Coordinates: 33°47′8″N 84°24′4″W

Architecture
- Established: 1980
- Completed: 2008
- Construction cost: $10 million
- Capacity: 5,000

Website
- alfarooqmasjid.org

Al-Farooq Masjid is a mosque in Atlanta, Georgia, United States. Founded in 1980, the mosque is one of the largest in the Southeastern United States. The current building, located in Atlanta's Home Park neighborhood, was completed in 2008.

== History ==
Al-Farooq Masjid was founded in 1980 in response to a growing population of South Asian (mostly Pakistani), Arab, and American Muslims in the city, including students from the nearby Georgia Institute of Technology (Georgia Tech) and Muslims from Techwood Homes and the city. The mosque was the first majority-immigrant mosque in the city, though several mosques serving African-American Muslims were present in the city at the time. It was established in Home Park, a neighborhood close to Georgia Tech's campus. The mosque later established a cemetery, and in the 1990s they opened two schools. In 1990, the mosque opened a K-8 school, and in 1992 another school was opened, focusing on Islamic studies. Al-Farooq later established an affiliated mosque in Norcross, Georgia.

In 1999, the mosque began a series of renovations, and in 2003, construction began on a new mosque building. This building, which cost $10 million, was completed in 2008. The new building features two copper domes, the larger of which is reminiscent of the Dome of the Rock in Jerusalem, and can hold an estimated 5,000 people. The new octagonal building also features a tall minaret, mashrabiya-covered balconies, and entryways featuring pointed arches. As of 2015, the mosque averaged approximately 1,000 attendees to Friday prayer sessions.

== Bibliography ==
- Barzegar, Abbas (2010). Curtis IV, Edward E. (ed.). Encyclopedia of Muslim-American History. Infobase Publishing. pp. 68–72. ISBN 978-1-4381-3040-8.
- Curiel, Jonathan (2015). Islam in America. I.B. Tauris. ISBN 978-0-85772-483-0.
- Karim, Jamillah (2009). American Muslim Women: Negotiating Race, Class, and Gender Within the Ummah. New York University Press. ISBN 978-0-8147-4809-1.
- Ramey, Steven (2006). Hill, Samuel S. (ed.). The New Encyclopedia of Southern Culture: Volume 1: Religion. University of North Carolina Press. pp. 79–81. ISBN 978-0-8078-7716-6.
- Thangaraj, Stanley (2015). King, C. Richard (ed.). Asian American Athletes in Sport and Society. Routledge. pp. 47–66. ISBN 978-1-317-59532-8.
