= Henry H. Proctor =

Reverend Henry H. Proctor
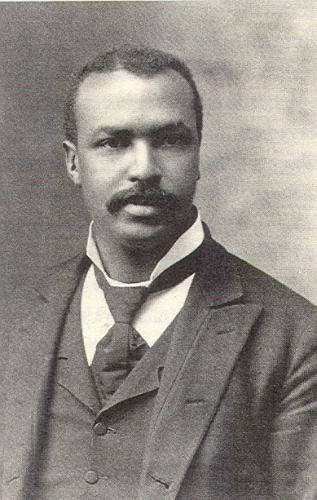
- Born: December 8, 1868; Tennessee
- Died: May 12, 1933 (aged 64)
- Education: Fisk University; Yale University; Clark University
- Known for: Pastor and community leader
- Spouse: Adeline Davis Proctor
- Children: 6, including Lillian Steele Proctor

Henry Hugh Proctor (b. December 8, 1868 near Fayetteville, Tenn., d. 1933) was a minister of the First Congregational Church in Atlanta, the second-oldest African American Congregational church in the United States. He was also an author and lecturer.

Proctor was born to parents who were former slaves Richard and Hannah Proctor, and he dug ditches and preached sermons to pay for his degree from Fisk University, graduating in 1891. In 1894, he received a Bachelor of Divinity degree from Yale University and was ordained into the Congregational ministry. Proctor became pastor of the First Congregational Church in Atlanta.

Proctor married fellow Fisk student Adeline Davis in 1894. The couple had six children, including Lillian Steele Proctor.

In 1903, Proctor joined George Washington Henderson, president of Straight University, a black college in New Orleans, to found the National Convention of Congregational Workers Among Colored People, and Proctor became its first president. In 1904, Clark University awarded Proctor a Doctor of Divinity degree. After the Atlanta Race Riot in 1906, Proctor and a white attorney worked together to quell remaining tensions and formed the Interracial Committee of Atlanta.

In the church, Proctor provided amenities lacking in the black community such as a library, a kindergarten, an employment bureau, a gymnasium, a ladies’ reading parlor, a music room, counseling services, and a model kitchen and sewing room for girls. Proctor's church sponsored a number of associations, including the Working Men's Club, the Woman's Aid Society, and the Young Men's League. He also helped open the first housing facility for young employed black women. Proctor was a strong believer in self-improvement. Proctor also founded the Atlanta Colored Music Festival Association, with concerts attended by both races, segregated but under one roof, believing that music could quell racial animosity. This festival continues to the present day as the Atlanta Music Festival.

In 1919 after World War I, Proctor ministered to black American troops in Europe. Afterwards he led the Nazarene Congregational Church in Brooklyn, the place where Proctor lived the rest of his life. He died on May 12, 1933 of blood poisoning.
