= Kittrell College =

Historically black college in Kittrell, North Carolina, US

Coordinates: 36.22505°N 78.442983°W

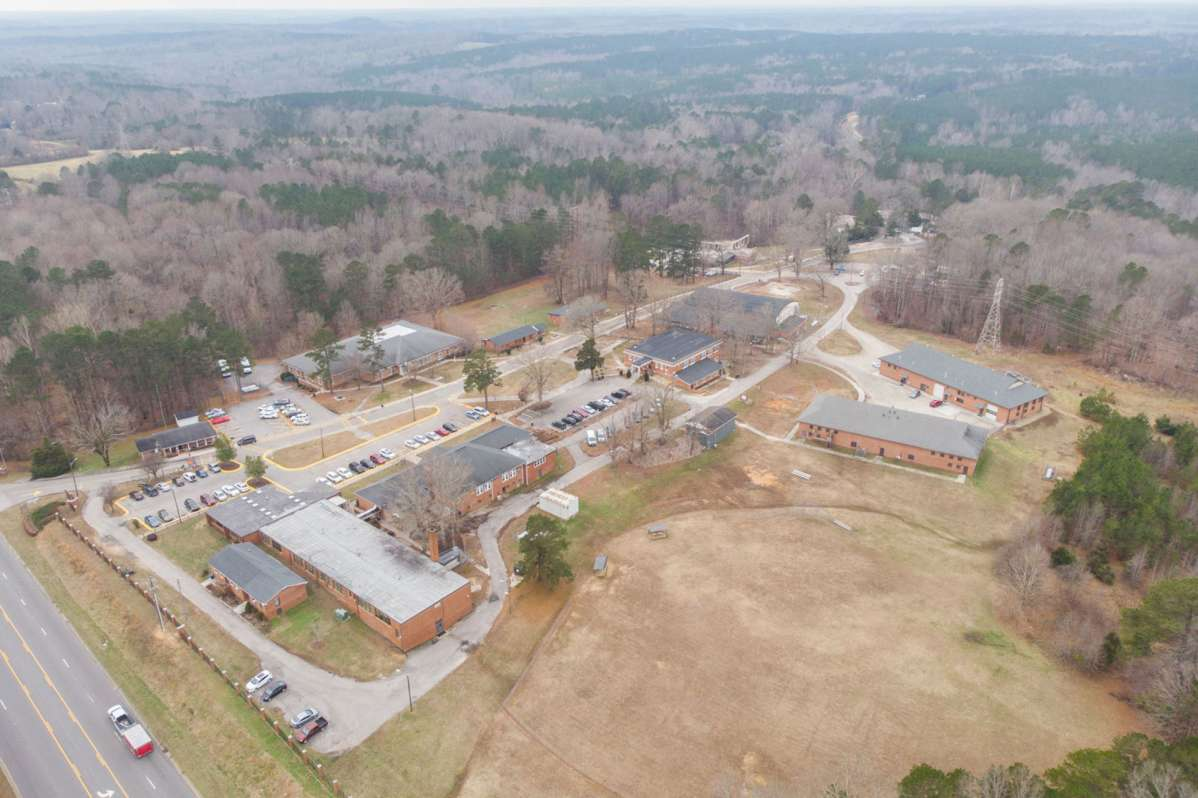
- Campus in 2019
- Former names: Kittrell Normal and Industrial School (1885–1887); Kittrell Institute (1887–1901)
- Type: Private historically black college
- Active: 1885–1975
- Religious affiliation: African Methodist Episcopal Church
- Location: Kittrell, North Carolina, United States
- Colors: Blue and Gold
- Mascot: Bulldog

Kittrell College was a two-year private historically black college from 1886 until 1975, in Kittrell, North Carolina. It was founded in association with the African Methodist Episcopal Church. After the college closed, many of its facilities became the Kittrell Job Corps Center campus. It is formerly known as the Kittrell Normal and Industrial School, and Kittrell Institute.

== History ==
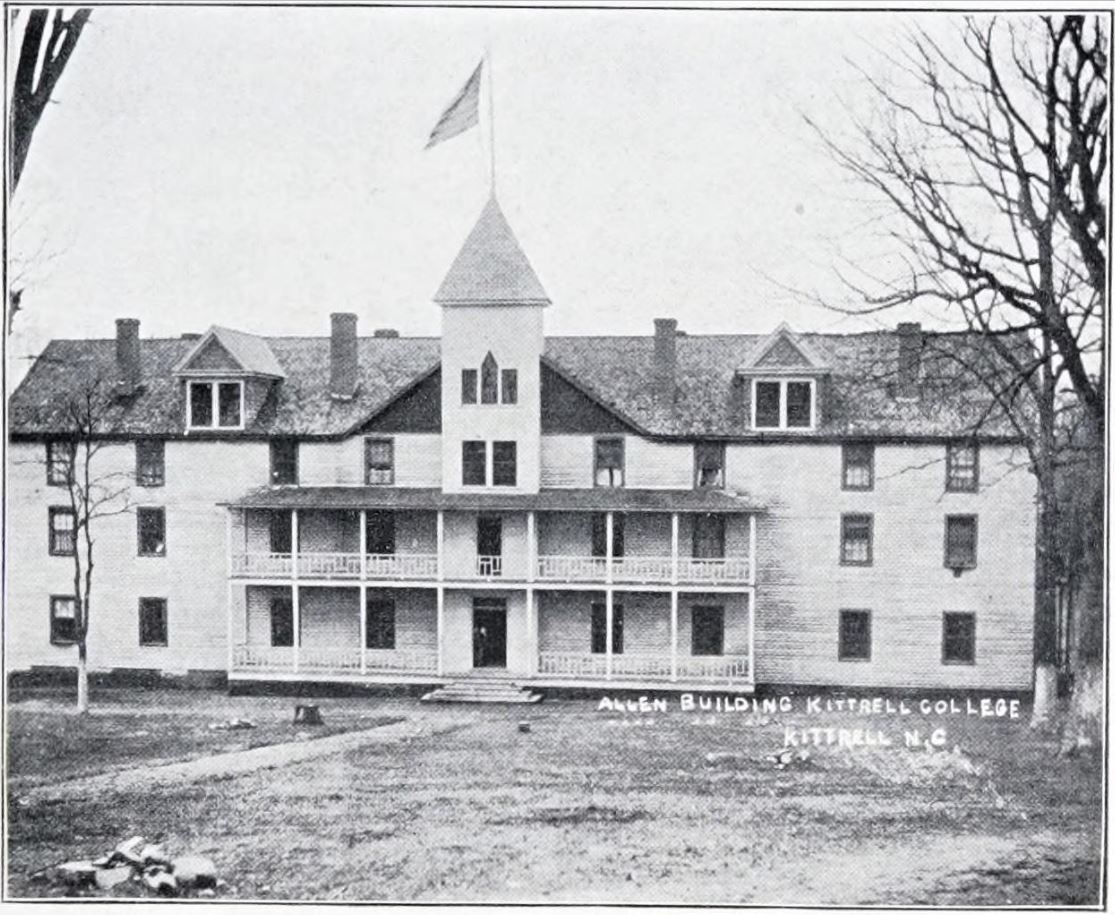
Allen Building, c. 1910

Kittrell College was originally chartered on February 7, 1886, by the African Methodist Episcopal Church in Kittrell, North Carolina, as Kittrell Normal and Industrial School. The North Carolina Conference in 1885, presided by Bishop William Fisher Dickerson, authorized the fund for the schools formation. It was founded to train underprivileged African-Americans as teachers and artisans.

The first session of classes began in 1886. In 1887, the school was rechartered and subsequently renamed as Kittrell Institute. With the second charter, it was able to train ministers as well. Kitrell Institute was once again rechartered in 1899, allowing it to begin post-secondary programs. In 1901, its name was changed for the last time, to Kittrell College.

In 1926, Kittrell College bought four buildings from Duke University: a library, Alspaugh Hall, Craven Memorial Hall, and Crowell Science Building. The purchase was at least partially funded by an endowment given by Benjamin Duke; he and his father, Washington Duke, were long-time donors to Kittrell. Three of the buildings were brought to the Kittrell campus, and the B.N. Duke Library was dedicated in October 1929, but the college did not have the funds to move the Crowell Science Building.

Kittrell College was closed for three years beginning in 1934 because of financial problems. The college reorganized and reopened in 1937, but closed once again in 1948. In 1953, it reopened as a high school and junior college. The college continued high school classes until 1965, when the last high school class graduated. In 1969, the school renovated the B.N. Duke Library for $269,900. It also opened a student center in January 1971 and planned to construct an on-campus dormitory.

All three buildings from Duke University, including the library, were destroyed by a fire in 1972. Six students were expelled for their alleged connection with the arson. There was also a fire in the business office in March 1973. In the 1970s the school also faced an investigation into the misallocation of federal money and failed to fund-raise enough money to erase debts. The last class graduated in 1975 and the school was disbanded shortly after. In 1979, the campus was purchased for a Federal Jobs Corps Center, which has remained in place since. Enrollment at closure was approximately 400.

=== Revitalization efforts ===
In 1997, several alumni were reported to be interested in restarting Kittrell College. In December 2020, Stephanie Freeman, a North Carolina educator, proposed to reopen Kittrell College.

== Notable alumni ==
- Pee Wee Kirkland - former street basketball player and member of Kittrell's basketball team
