= Wheat Street Baptist Church =

Church in Atlanta, Georgia, US

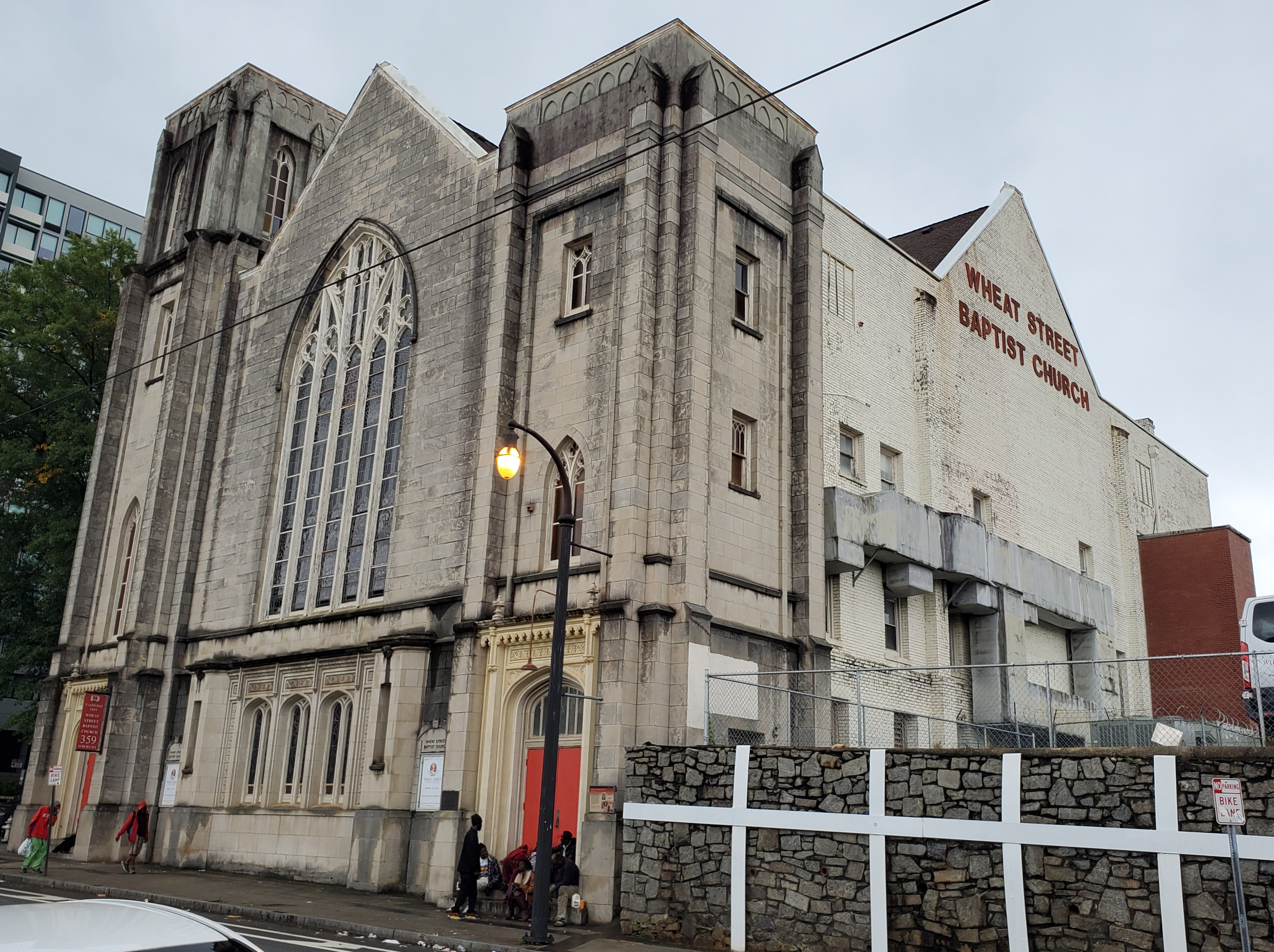
- Wheat Street Baptist Church (2020)

- 33.7551682°N 84.3756783°W
- Denomination: Baptist
- Website: www.wearewheatstreet.org

History
- Founded: 1869

Architecture
- Completed: August 1921

Wheat Street Baptist Church is a historic black Baptist church located in the Sweet Auburn neighborhood of Atlanta, Georgia. Founded in 1869, the current building was constructed in 1921 and is located adjacent to the Martin Luther King Jr. National Historical Park. The church is notable for the role it played in the Civil Rights Movement, especially under the leadership of William Holmes Borders, who served as pastor of the church from 1937 to 1988.

== History ==
The church was founded in 1869 by members of First Baptist Church in Atlanta (now known as Friendship Baptist Church) who wanted a place of worship closer to where they lived. Seven members founded Mt. Pleasant Baptist Church on Howell Street, originally holding service under a bush arbor. Andrew Jackson would serve as the church's first pastor, a position he would hold until 1874. The church would relocate several times before moving to its present location on Auburn Avenue (at the time known as Wheat Street, hence the present name). In 1881, the church played a role in the Atlanta washerwomen strike, as a meeting of over 500 strikers was held in the church. In 1894, the Butler Street YMCA was formed in the basement of the church building. From 1898 to 1928, P. James Bryant served as the church's pastor.

The current building was built in August 1921 after the previous building was destroyed in the Great Atlanta fire of 1917. In 1932, Wheat Street hosted a meeting of the NAACP. In 1937, William Holmes Borders became the church pastor, a position he would hold until 1988. Borders would become a prominent activist in the civil rights movement, influencing a young Martin Luther King Jr. King would often attend sermons held by Borders, and Borders's wife had been King's English teacher.

Wheat Street is notable for its community outreach programs. On March 7, 1956, it became one of the first churches in the United States, and the first black church, to sponsor a federal credit union. The church also maintains a charitable foundation and housing ministry, and in 1999 held over $33 million worth of real estate, making it one of the richest black churches in the United States.

== Bibliography ==
- Baldwin, Lewis V. (2010). The Voice of Conscience: The Church in the Mind of Martin Luther King, Jr. Oxford University Press. ISBN 978-0-19-538030-9 – via Google Books.
- Billingsley, Andrew (1999). Mighty Like a River: The Black Church and Social Reform. Oxford University Press. ISBN 978-0-19-802658-7 – via Google Books.
- Du Bois, W. E. B.; Pollard III, Alton B. (2011). The Negro Church: With an Introduction by Alton B. Pollard III. Cascade Books. ISBN 978-1-60899-767-1 – via Google Books.
- Hunter, Tera W. (2007). Arnesen, Eric (ed.). Encyclopedia of U.S. Labor and Working-class History. Vol. 1. Routledge. p. 135. ISBN 978-0-415-96826-3 – via Google Books.
- Schott-Bresler, Kayla (March 14, 2014). "Wheat Street Baptist Church, Atlanta, Georgia (1869- )". BlackPast.org.
- Smith, R. Drew; Harris, Fredrick C., eds. (2005). Black Churches and Local Politics: Clergy Influence, Organizational Partnerships, and Civic Empowerment. Rowman & Littlefield. ISBN 978-0-7425-4522-9 – via Google Books.
- Tillery, Carolyn Quick (2006). Southern Homecoming Traditions: Recipes And Remembrances. Citadel Press. pp. xxii. ISBN 978-0-8065-2683-6 – via Google Books.
