= Big Bethel AME Church =

African American church in Atlanta, Georgia

Coordinates: 33.7558°N 84.3805°W

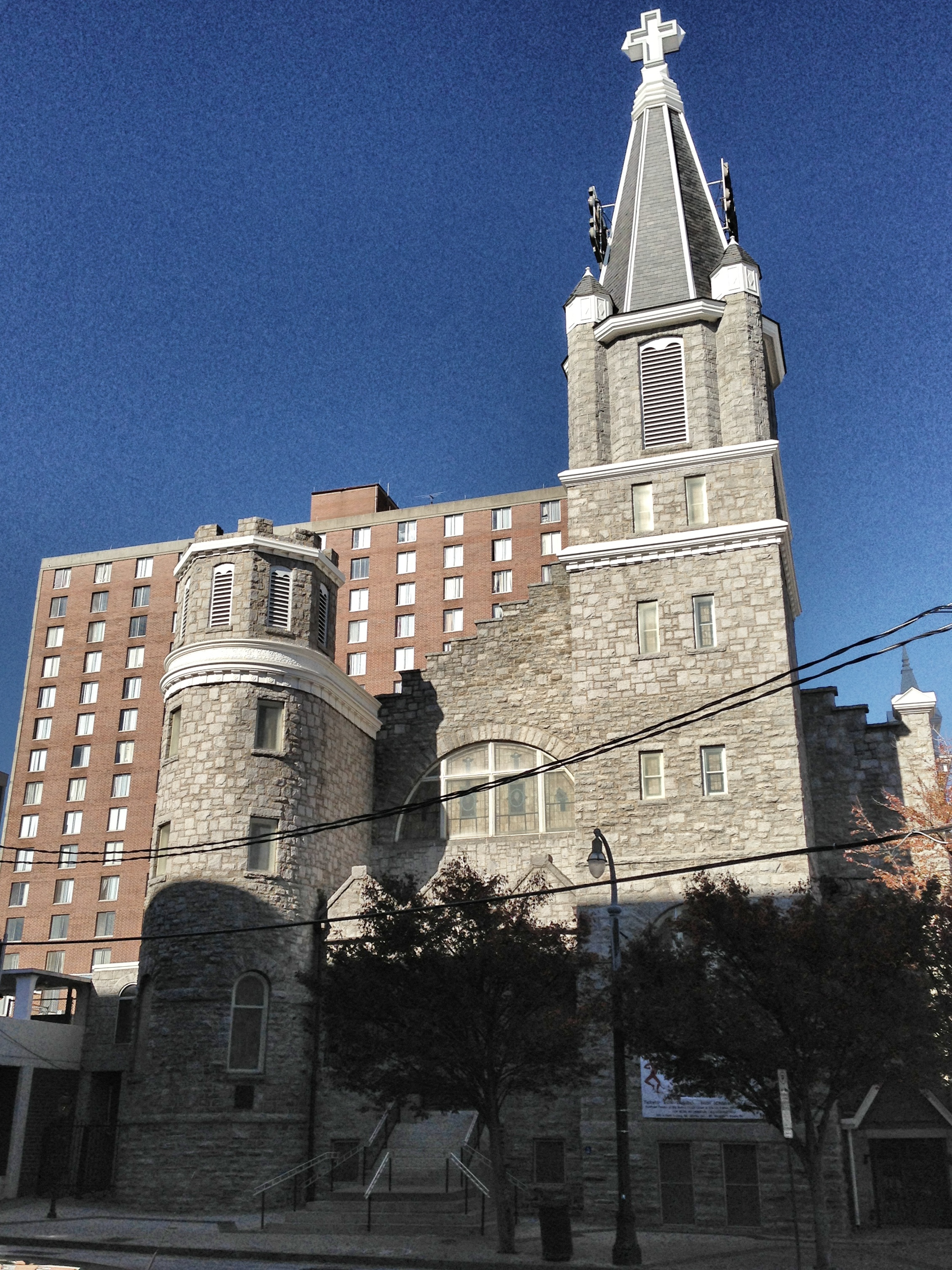
- Big Bethel AME Church seen across Auburn Ave. in 2012
- Big Bethel AME Church
- Location: Atlanta, Georgia
- Country: United States
- Denomination: Black church

History
- Founded: 1847

The Big Bethel AME Church is a black church on Sweet Auburn in Atlanta, Georgia, United States.

== History ==
The Big Bethel AME Church was founded in 1847 as Union Church in Marthasville, Georgia. They changed their name to Union Church then to Big Bethel AME Church, then Bethel Tabernacle. At the close of the Civil War, the church spread throughout the former Confederacy, and the Bethel Tabernacle allied with the denomination, becoming Bethel African Methodist Episcopal Church. Its first pastor was Reverend Joseph Woods.

In 1879, the first public school for blacks in Atlanta, Gate City Colored School, was founded in the basement of the church, though it would later move to Houston Street. Morris Brown College held its first classes in the church in 1881 before moving to its first campus. Big Bethel was known as "Sweet Auburn's City Hall."

In 1911, President William Howard Taft spoke in the church, as did Nelson Mandela in 1990.

During the 1960s, the church served as the annual meeting place for the Atlanta Negro Voters League.

The morality play Heaven Bound was written by attendees and is performed annually at the church.
