= Neighborhoods in Atlanta =

Note: Many areas in the core metro counties surrounding the city use Atlanta postal addresses while not being part of city limits. These areas include formerly unincorporated areas of Fulton County now within the cities of Sandy Springs, South Fulton, College Park and East Point. This also applies to several unincorporated areas of DeKalb County, including Gresham Park and North Druid Hills, the Cumberland/Vinings area of Cobb County, unincorporated areas near Hartsfield-Jackson Atlanta International Airport in Clayton County, and unincorporated areas near Spaghetti Junction in Gwinnett County.

The city of Atlanta, Georgia is made up of 243 neighborhoods officially defined by the city. These neighborhoods are a mix of traditional neighborhoods, subdivisions, or groups of subdivisions. The neighborhoods are grouped by the city planning department into 25 neighborhood planning units (NPUs). These NPUs are "citizen advisory councils that make recommendations to the Mayor and City Council on zoning, land use, and other planning issues". There are a variety of other widely recognized named areas within the city. Some are officially designated, while others are more informal.

== Other areas ==
In addition to the officially designated neighborhoods, many other named areas exist. Several larger areas, consisting of multiple neighborhoods, are not formally defined but commonly used. Most notable are Buckhead, Midtown, and Downtown. Other smaller examples exist, such as Little Five Points, which encompasses parts of three neighborhoods. Some of these regions may overlap, such as West Midtown, an area which includes several neighborhoods on the west side of the larger Midtown area.

Some of these areas are connected with community groups such as Midtown Alliance or Community improvement districts (CIDs) such as the Buckhead CID. While those organizations often have an associated definition of the areas they represent, those definitions may not be the same as the common usage. Less formally, some areas of the city are referred to by compass directions, such as Southwest Atlanta.

== Neighborhoods (by area) ==
=== Intown Atlanta ===
The term "intown" is historically most commonly used to refer to any neighborhoods close to the central part of the city.

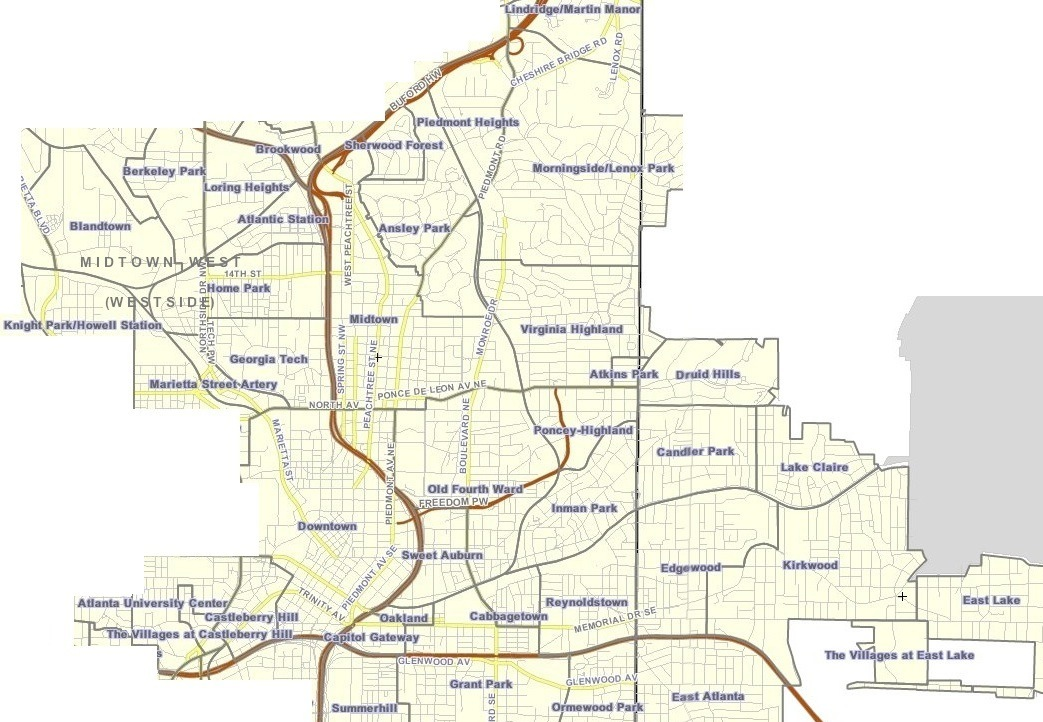
Neighborhoods of Intown Atlanta

Downtown

Downtown Atlanta n is a neighborhood that
contains the following sub-districts:

- Castleberry Hill Arts District h
- Centennial Hill Energy District
- Fairlie-Poplar district h
- Five Points district
- Government Walk
- Garnett
- Centennial Yards
- Peachtree Center
- South Downtown

Midtown

Midtown, as defined by the Midtown Alliance, consists of these neighborhoods:

- The Midtown neighborhood proper which contains the districts:
  - Midtown Core
  - Midtown Historic District
- Ansley Park
- Atlantic Station
- Georgia Tech and Technology Square
- Home Park
- Loring Heights
- Sherwood Forest

Westside

Westside or The West Side, is an agglomeration of neighborhoods west of I-75/85 (frequently referred to as the "Connector") and is an unofficial area whose definition varies, and includes:

- Berkeley Park
- Blandtown
- Western Home Park
- Knight Park/Howell Station
- Marietta Street Artery

Sometimes Bolton and Hills Park are also included (see below: Northwestern Atlanta)

East Side

- Atkins Park
- Cabbagetown
- Candler Park
- Druid Hills (part in Atlanta)
- East Atlanta
- East Lake
- Edgewood
- Inman Park
- Kirkwood
- Lake Claire
- Lindridge-Martin Manor
- Morningside-Lenox Park
- Oakland
- Old Fourth Ward
- Ormewood Park
- Piedmont Heights
- Poncey-Highland
- Reynoldstown
- Sweet Auburn
- Scottdale
- Virginia-Highland
- Candler-Mcafee

The Little Five Points district is located where Inman Park and Candler Park meet.

=== Southeastern Atlanta ===
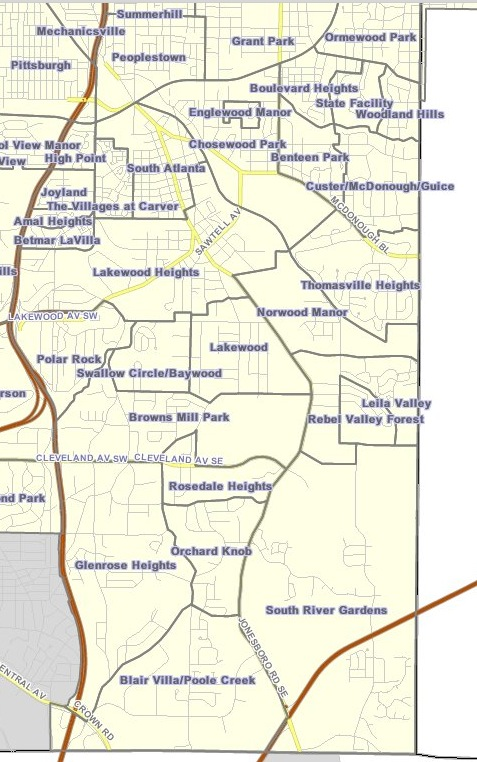
Neighborhoods of Southeast Atlanta

- Amal Heights
- Candler-Mcafee
- Benteen Park
- Betmar LaVilla
- Blair Villa/Poole Creek
- Boulevard Heights
- Browns Mill Park
- Chosewood Park
- Custer/McDonough/Guice
- Englewood Manor (AHA property demolished 2008)
- Glenrose Heights
- Grant Park
- High Point
- Joyland
- Lakewood
- Lakewood Heights
- Leila Valley (AHA property demolished 2008)
- Norwood Manor
- Orchard Knob
- Peoplestown
- Polar Rock
- Rebel Valley Forest
- Rosedale Heights
- South Atlanta
- South River Gardens
- State Facility
- Summerhill
- Swallow Circle/Baywood
- The Villages at Carver
- Thomasville Heights— not to be confused with the former housing project of the same name, located near the neighborhood. (AHA property demolished 2010–11)
- Woodland Hills

=== Southwestern Atlanta ===
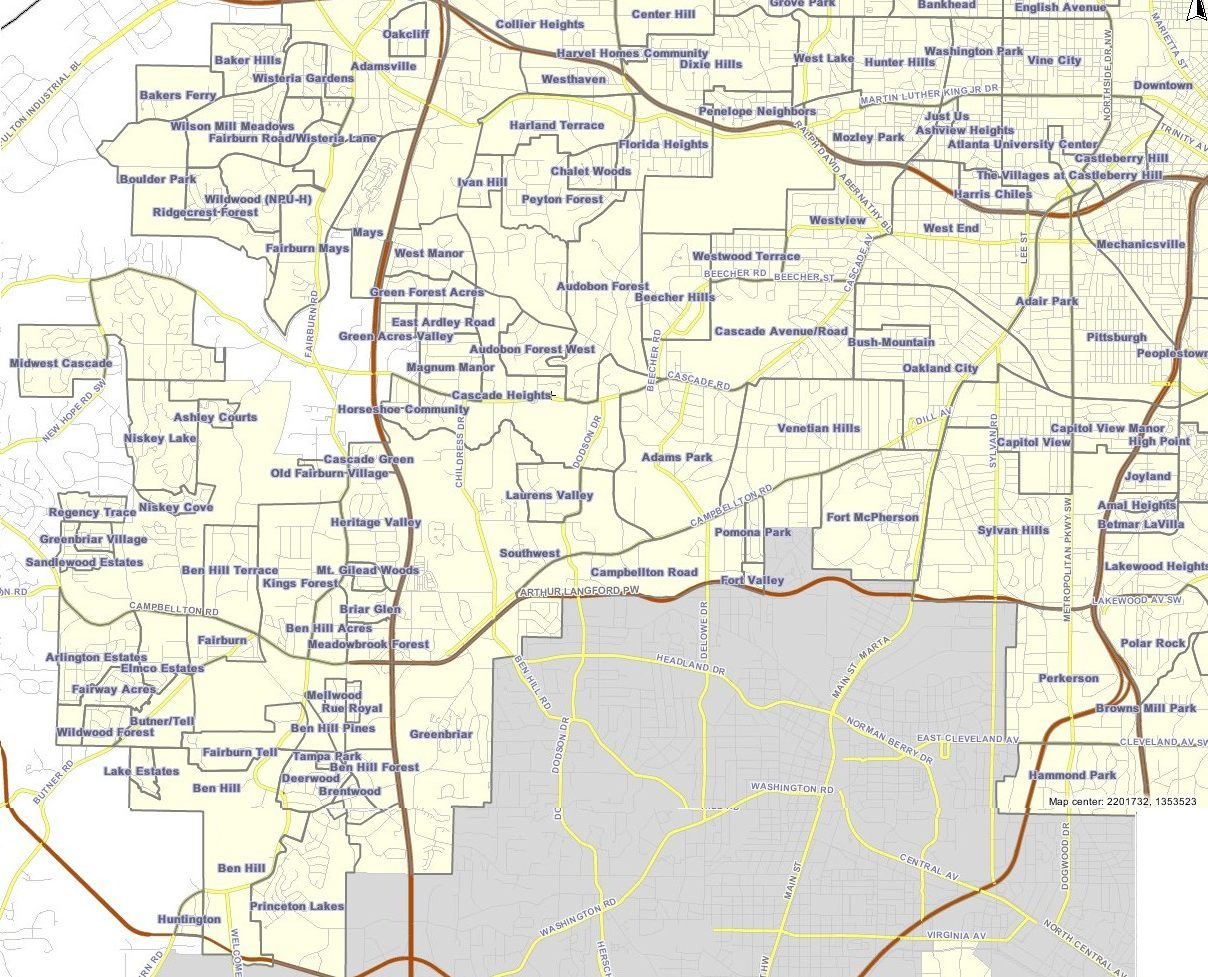
Southwest Atlanta

- Adair Park
- Adams Park
- Adamsville
- Arlington Estates
- Ashley Collegetown (former Harris Chiles)
- Ashley Courts
- Ashview Heights
- Atlanta University Center
- Audubon Forest
- Audubon Forest West
- Baker Hills
- Bakers Ferry
- Beecher Hills
- Ben Hill
- Ben Hill Acres
- Ben Hill Forest
- Ben Hill Pines
- Ben Hill Terrace
- Boulder Park
- Brentwood
- Briar Glen
- Bush Mountain
- Butner/Tell
- Campbellton Road
- Capitol View
- Capitol View Manor
- Carroll Heights
- Cascade Avenue/Road
- Cascade Green
- Cascade Heights
- Chalet Woods
- Collier Heights
- Deerwood
- East Ardley Road
- Elmco Estates
- Fairburn
- Fairburn Heights
- Fairburn Road/Wisteria Lane
- Fairburn Tell
- Fairburn Mays
- Fairway Acres
- Florida Heights
- Fort McPherson
- Fort Valley
- Green Acres Valley
- Green Forest Acres
- Greenbriar
- Greenbriar Village
- Hammond Park
- Harland Terrace
- Heritage Valley
- Horseshoe Community
- Hunter Hills
- Huntington
- Ivan Hill
- Just Us
- Kings Forest
- Lake Estates
- Laurens Valley
- Magnum Manor
- Mays
- Meadowbrook Forest
- Mechanicsville
- Mellwood
- Midwest Cascade
- Mozley Park
- Mt. Gilead Woods
- Niskey Cove
- Niskey Lake
- Oakcliff
- Oakland City
- Old Fairburn Village
- Old Gordon
- Pomona Park
- Perkerson
- Peyton Forest
- Pittsburgh
- Princeton Lakes
- Regency Trace
- Ridgecrest Forest
- Rue Royal
- Sandlewood Estates
- South Oaks
- Southwest
- Summerdale Commons
- Sylvan Hills
- Tampa Park
- Venetian Hills
- West End
- West Manor
- Westhaven
- Westview
- Westwood Terrace
- Wildwood
- Wildwood Forest
- Wilson Mill Meadows
- Wisteria Gardens

=== Northwestern Atlanta ===
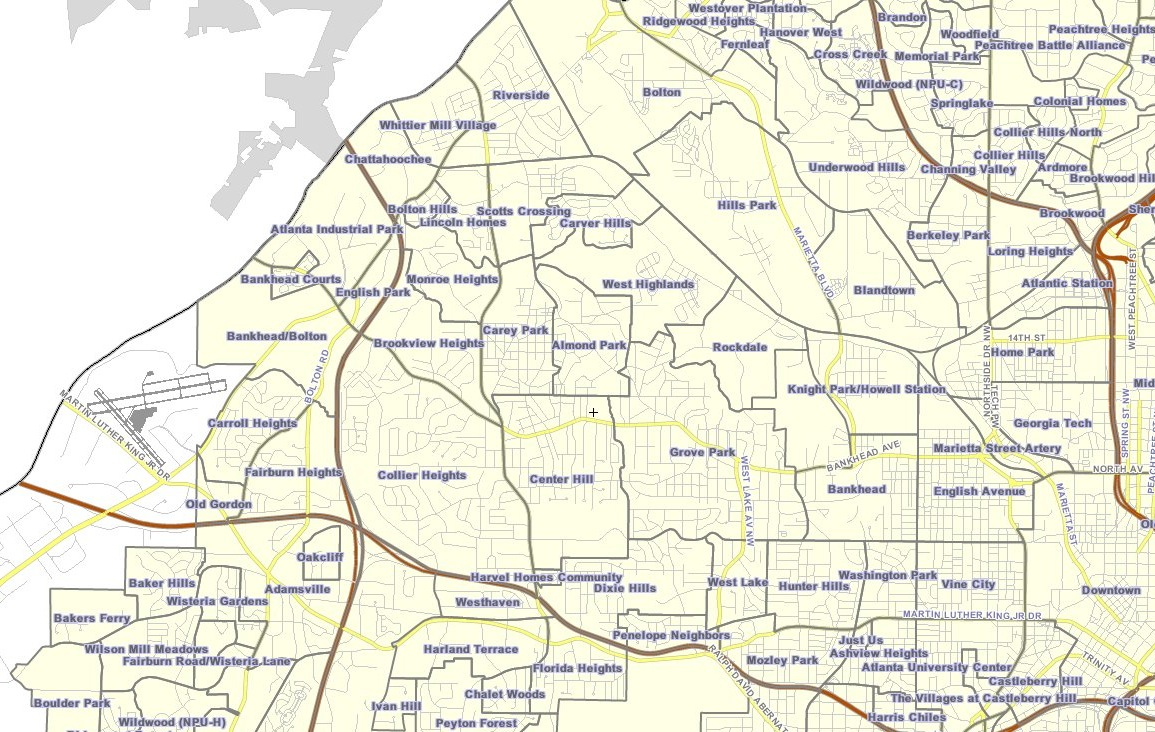
Northwest Atlanta

- Almond Park
- Atlanta Industrial Park
- Bankhead
- Bankhead Courts (AHA property demolished 2010)
- Bolton
- Bolton Hills
- Bowen Apartments
- Brookview Heights
- Carey Park
- Carver Hills
- Center Hill
- Chattahoochee
- Dixie Hills
- English Avenue
- English Park
- Grove Park
- Harvel Homes
- Hills Park
- Hunter Hills
- Knight Park/Howell Station
- Monroe Heights(45)
- Mozley Park
- Penelope Neighbors
- Riverside
- Rockdale
- Scotts Crossing
- Vine City
- Washington Park
- West Highlands (includes Perry Homes)
- West Lake
- Whittier Mill Village

=== Buckhead ===
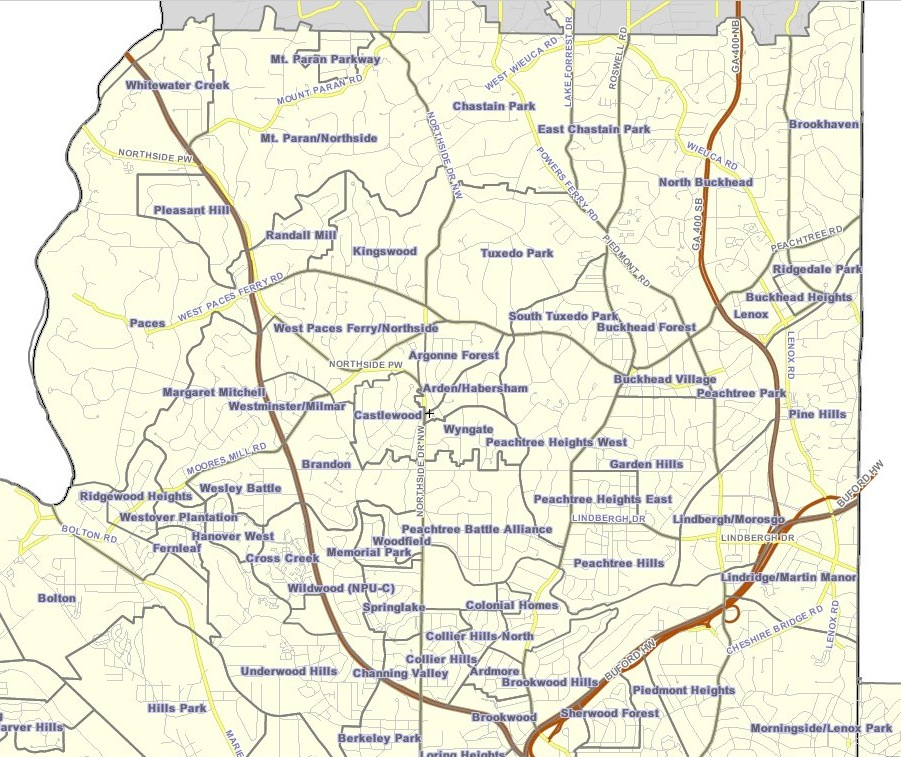
Buckhead

- Ardmore
- Argonne Forest
- Arden/Habersham
- Brookhaven
- Buckhead Forest
- Brandon
- Brookwood
- Brookwood Hills
- Buckhead Forest
- Buckhead Village
- Castlewood
- Channing Valley (also includes Memorial Park)
- Chastain Park
- Collier Hills (also includes Brookwood Hills)
- Colonial Homes
- East Chastain Park
- Garden Hills
- Hanover West
- Haynes Manor
- Historic Brookhaven
- Kingswood
- Lindbergh/Morosgo
- Loring Heights
- Margaret Mitchell
- Mount Paran/Northside
- Mount Paran Parkway
- North Buckhead
- Paces
- Peachtree Heights East
- Peachtree Heights West
- Peachtree Hills
- Peachtree Park
- Pine Hills
- Randall Mill
- Ridgedale Park
- Springlake
- South Tuxedo Park
- Tuxedo Park
- Underwood Hills
- West Paces Ferry/Northside
- Westminster/Milmar
- West Peachtree Battle (Known as Wesley Battle by city government)
- Whitewater Creek
- Wildwood
- Woodfield
- Wyngate
