= Loring Heights, Atlanta =

Neighborhood of Atlanta, Georgia

Coordinates: 33.796105°N 84.400927°W

Loring Heights is a neighborhood of just over 300 homes, several townhome communities, as well as a few apartment complexes in the West Midtown district of Atlanta, Georgia, nestled between Peachtree Street on the east, Northside Drive on the west, and Atlantic Station to the south. Prior to the 2020 census, the neighborhood was located within Atlanta City Council District 8. However, following redistricting based on the 2020 United States Census, the area is now part of District 9. The neighborhood provides relatively easy access to I-75/85, GA 400, and I-285.

The neighborhood is part of NPU E, which includes:

- Ansley Park
- Ardmore
- Atlantic Station
- Brookwood
- Brookwood Hills
- Georgia Tech
- Home Park
- Loring Heights
- Marietta Street Artery
- Midtown
- Sherwood Forest

The neighborhood is composed of bungalows from the 1940s and new construction infills. Loring Heights was originally a neighborhood for Atlantic Steel mill workers. In earlier decades, Loring Heights was more often linked administratively and politically with areas that many would consider part of Buckhead. For example, older city council district maps sometimes placed it in districts associated with Buckhead, even though the community itself developed as a distinct mill-worker neighborhood. So while modern designations now embrace West Midtown, historically Loring Heights was more commonly grouped with Buckhead or considered part of Atlanta's Northside areas rather than being labeled as West Midtown.

Loring Heights is part of Atlanta Public Schools. The neighborhood schools are E. Rivers Elementary, Sutton Middle, and North Atlanta High Schools. The Loring Heights subdivision was developed by Edgar H. Sims Sr., an Atlanta builder and developer, who also developed Collier Hills and a number of other subdivisions in the Atlanta area during the 1930s and 1940s. The homes were marketed by Sharp Boylston Company.
