= Brookwood =

Brookwood can refer to:

- Brookwood, a shopping center and hospital in Homewood, Alabama
- Brookwood, Alabama, a place in the Tuscaloosa metropolitan area
- Brookwood, Surrey, a village in Surrey, England
- Brookwood Cemetery, a place in England
- Brookwood Hospital near Woking in Surrey
- Brookwood Park, a country house later school at Bramdean, near Winchester, Hampshire
- Brookwood railway station, in Surrey
- Brookwood (Atlanta), a neighborhood in Atlanta, Georgia
- Brookwood Hills, a neighborhood in Atlanta, Georgia
- Chevrolet Brookwood, a Chevrolet station wagon
- Brookwood Church, a Southern Baptist Megachurch located in Simpsonville, South Carolina

== Schools ==
- Brookwood Elementary School, a school in the Hillsboro School District in Hillsboro, Oregon
- Brookwood High School (Georgia), a high school in Snellville, Georgia
- Brookwood Labor College, a school for progressive labor education in Katonah, New York
- Brookwood School, a school in Manchester, Massachusetts
