= Tanyard Creek Park =

Coordinates: 33°48′30″N 84°24′9″W

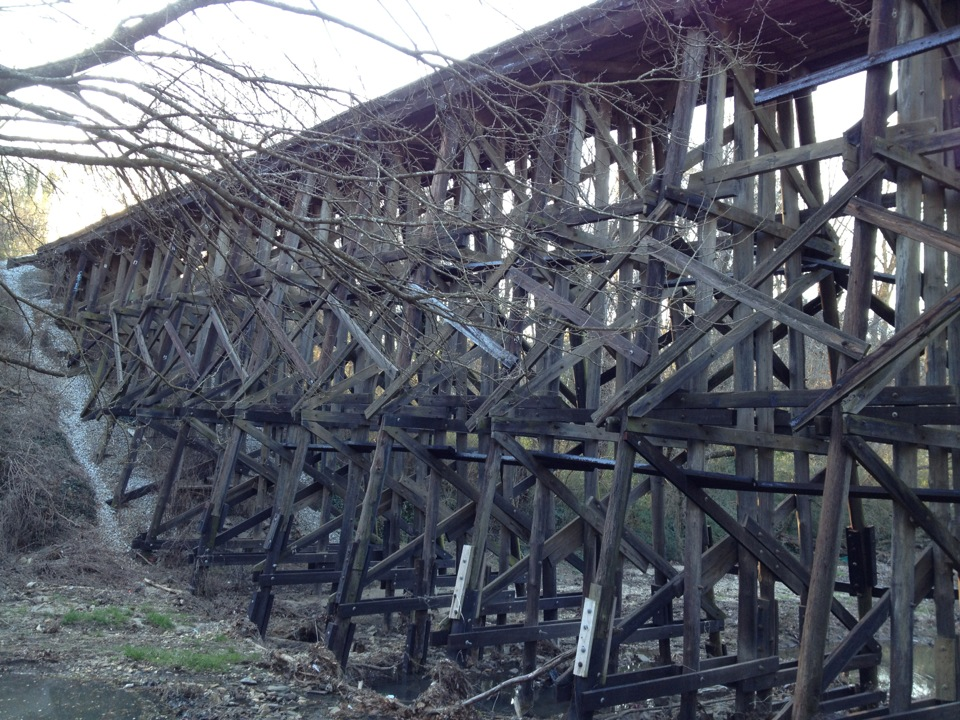
Trestle bridge crossing Tanyard Creek, marking the south end of Tanyard Creek Park

Tanyard Creek Park is a 14.5-acre (5.9 ha) park in the Buckhead area of Atlanta. It is located along Tanyard Creek between Collier Road on the north and BeltLine rail corridor to the south. The neighborhood of Collier Hills borders it on the west and Collier Hills North on the east.

A 1-mile (1.6 km)-long BeltLine trail runs through the park - not along the BeltLine rail corridor itself but perpendicular to it. The trail begins at the west end of Colonial Homes neighborhood, proceeds west along the south end of Bobby Jones Golf Course, Louise G. Howard Park, under Collier Road and through Tanyard Creek Park, under a trestle bridge (active CSX rail line), connecting to both Ardmore Park in the Ardmore neighborhood and into the Tanyard Creek Urban Forest. The trail, and urban forest, terminates at Semel Circle, a new infill development area at the back of Brookwood neighborhood. The trail opened in April 2010.

The Civil War Battle of Peachtree Creek took place in and around the park.
