= Loring Heights =

Loring Heights may refer to:

- Loring Heights (Atlanta), neighborhood of Atlanta
- Stevens Square/Loring Heights, neighborhood of Minneapolis
