= Oakland, Atlanta =

Neighborhood of Atlanta, Georgia

Coordinates: 33.748029°N 84.380253°W

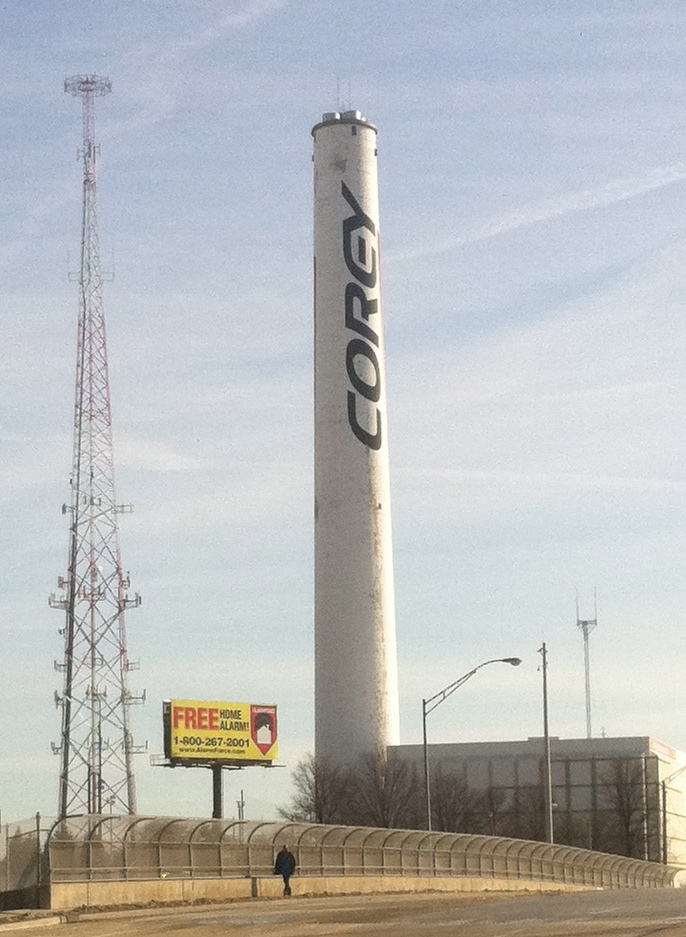
Corey smokestack in the Oakland neighborhood of Atlanta

Oakland is an officially recognized neighborhood of Atlanta consisting of only four blocks. It is bounded by:

- the Downtown Connector freeway on the west, across which is Downtown Atlanta and the Georgia State Capitol building
- Grant Street on the east, across which is one block of the Grant Park (Atlanta) neighborhood and then the historic Oakland Cemetery (Atlanta)
- Martin Luther King Jr. Drive and the Grant Park (Atlanta) and Capitol Gateway neighborhoods on the south
- the MARTA east–west rail line on the north

Oakland contains the disused Corey smokestack; Mattress Factory Lofts, site of the former Southern Spring Bedding factory, with some buildings built as far back as 1864; and Crown Candy Lofts.
