= Douglas Hapeman =

American Civil War Medal of Honor recipient (1839–1905)

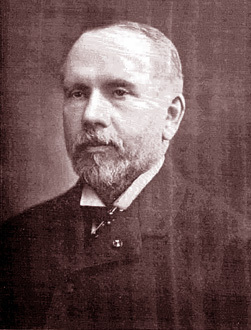
- Born: January 15, 1839; Ephratah, New York
- Died: June 3, 1905 (aged 66); Ottawa, Illinois
- Burial place: Ottawa Avenue Cemetery
- Spouse: Ella Thomas Hapeman
- Military career
- Allegiance: United States
- Branch: Army
- Rank: Lieutenant Colonel
- Unit: 104th Illinois Infantry
- Awards: Medal of Honor

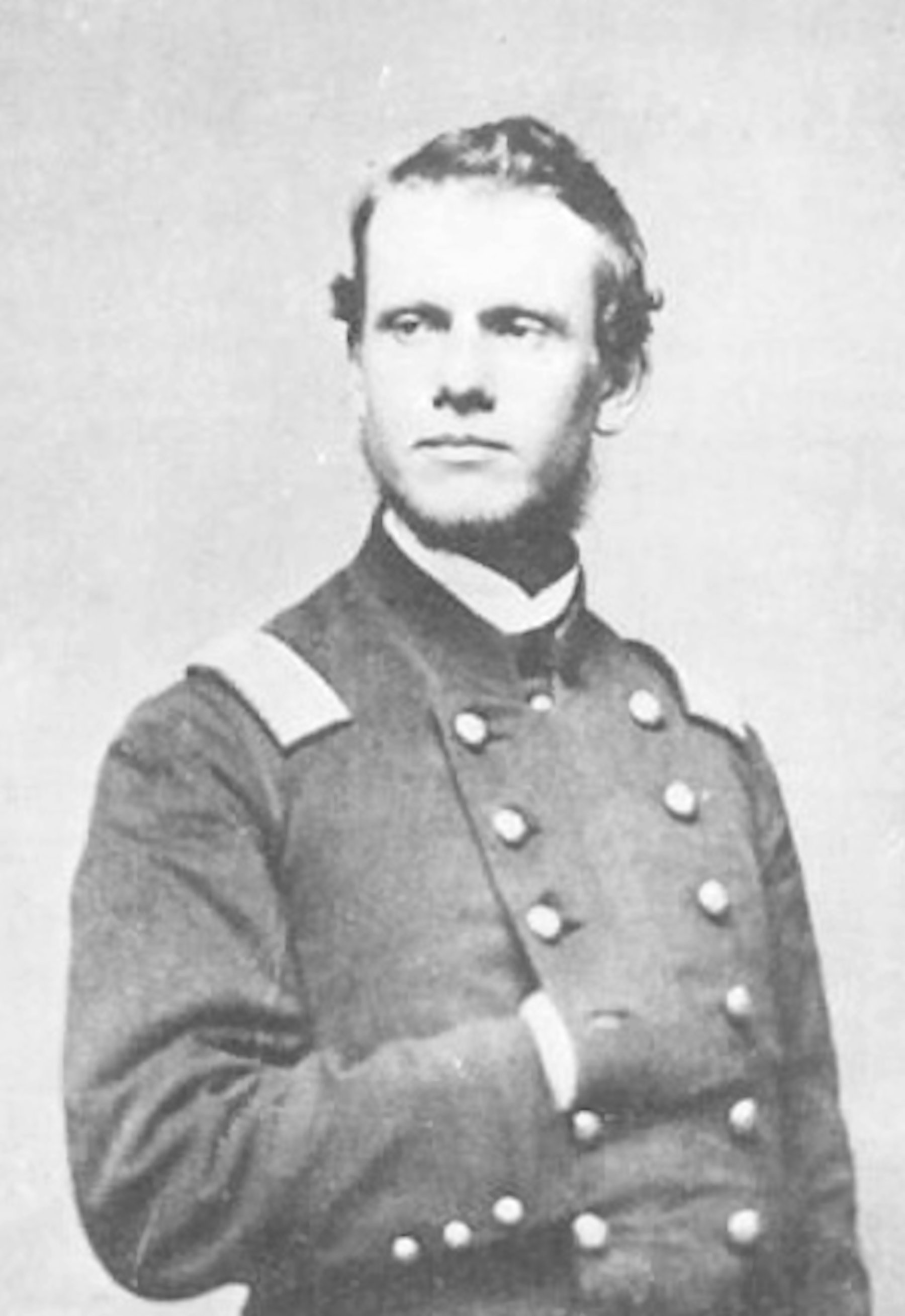
Hapeman in 1865

Douglas Hapeman (1839–1905) was a Lieutenant Colonel in the 104th Illinois Infantry during the American Civil War, where he was awarded the Medal of Honor. He was born on January 15, 1839, in Ephratah, New York, and later moved to Illinois. Hapeman was awarded the medal for his actions on July 20, 1864, at the Battle of Peachtree Creek, Georgia. There, he "rallied his men under a severe attack, re-formed the broken ranks, and repulsed the attack," and acted with "conspicuous coolness and bravery." He was awarded his Medal of Honor on April 5, 1898.

After the war, he was elected as a companion of the Military Order of the Loyal Legion of the United States.

Hapeman was married to Ella Thomas Hapeman (1849-1907), and had two kids after the Civil War: Mary T Hapeman Hoffman (1869-1940), and William Thomas Hapeman (1873-1949). Hapeman died on June 3, 1905, in Ottawa, Illinois, and is now buried in Ottawa Avenue Cemetery.

== See also ==
- Battle of Peachtree Creek
- 104th Illinois Infantry
- Atlanta campaign
