= Sherwood Forest, Atlanta =

Coordinates: 33.799°N 84.382°W

Sherwood Forest
- Neighborhood
- Interactive map of Sherwood Forest
- Country: United States
- State: Georgia
- County: Fulton County
- City: City of Atlanta
- NPU: E location= Atlanta, Georgia built =1949

Population (2008)
  - Total: 865

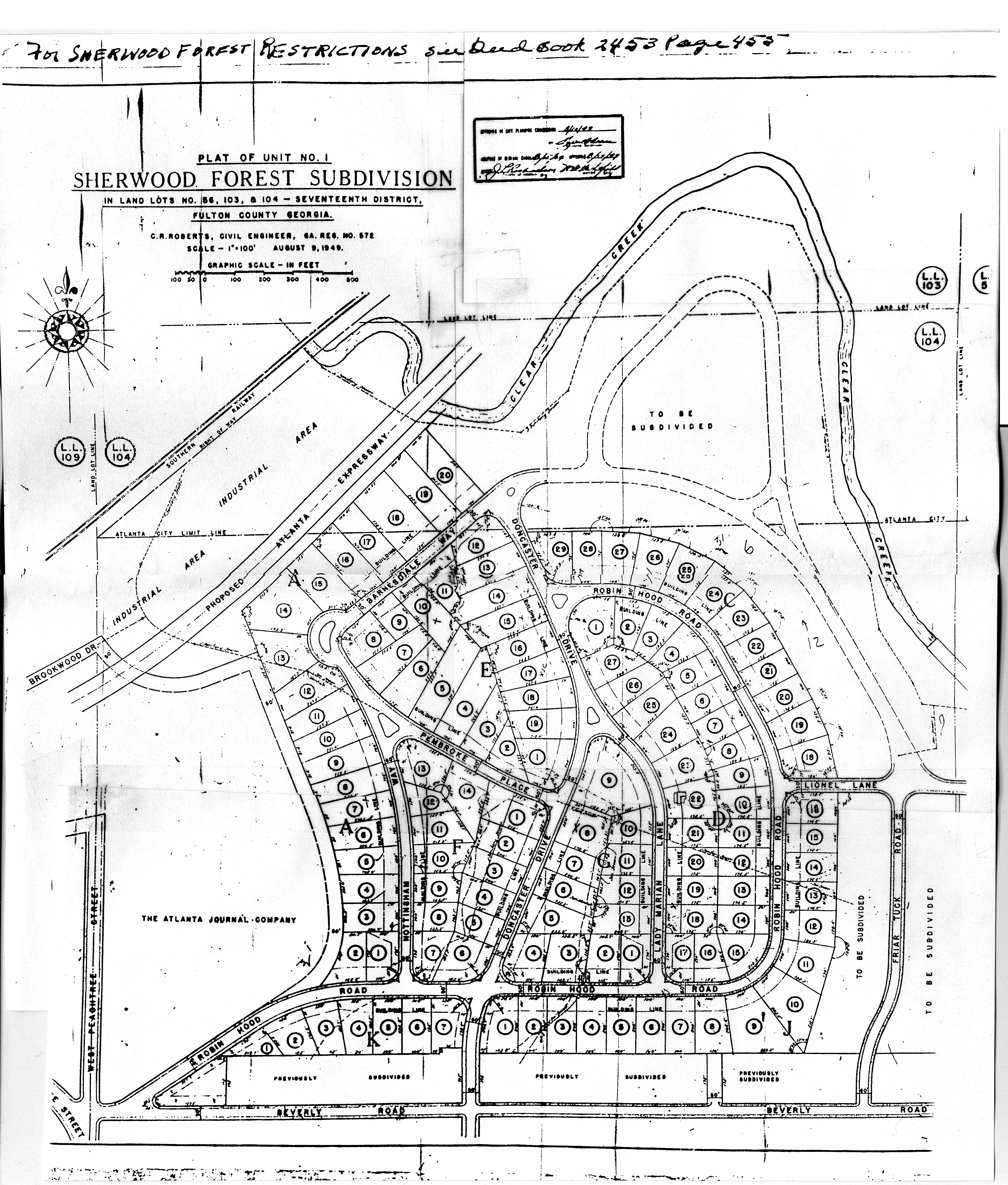
Original 1949 plat of Sherwood Forest

Sherwood Forest is an intown neighborhood of Atlanta, Georgia, bordered by the Ansley Park neighborhood on the south and east, and on the northwest by the Downtown Connector across which is the Brookwood Hills neighborhood. It was established in 1949. It is one of the most affluent neighborhoods of the city with an average single-family home price of $951,376 in 2008.
