= Ottawa Avenue Cemetery =

Historic cemetery in La Salle County, Illinois

Coordinates: 41.336944°N 88.866389°W

- Interactive map of Ottawa Avenue Cemetery

Details
- Established: 1847
- Location: Ottawa, Illinois

The Ottawa Avenue Cemetery is located in Ottawa, Illinois. It was founded as the Ottawa Cemetery Association in 1847 by George H. Norris and was incorporated in 1865.

== Notable burials ==
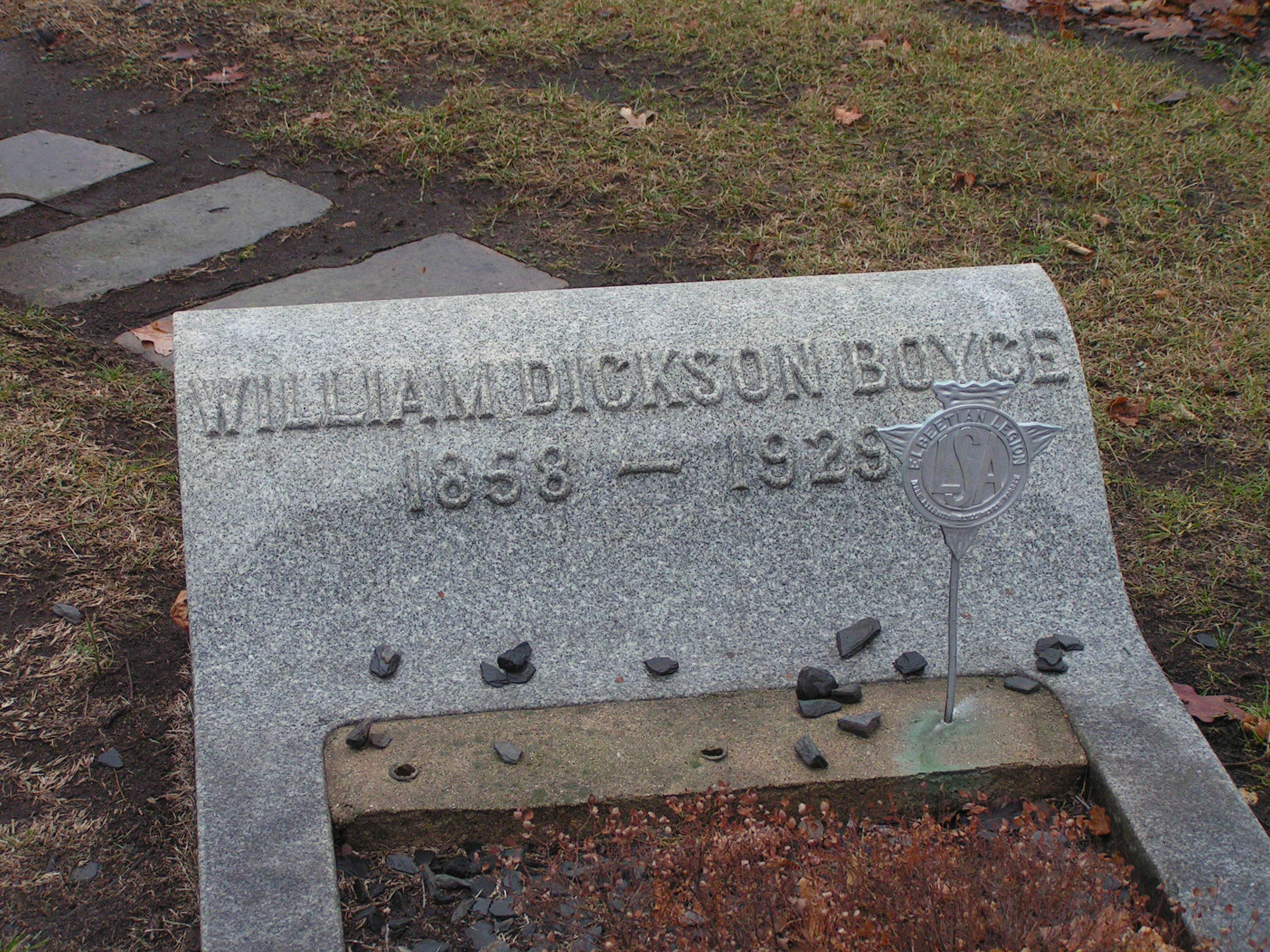
Boyce gravesite

- William D. Boyce (1858–1929), social reformer and founder of the Boy Scouts of America
- William Cullen (1826–1914), US Congressman
- Douglas Hapeman (1839–1905), Civil War Medal of Honor Recipient
- George Marsh (1836–1915) Civil War Medal of Honor Recipient
