= Ardmore (Atlanta) =

Neighborhood in Buckhead, Atlanta

Coordinates: 33.8054°N 84.3970°W

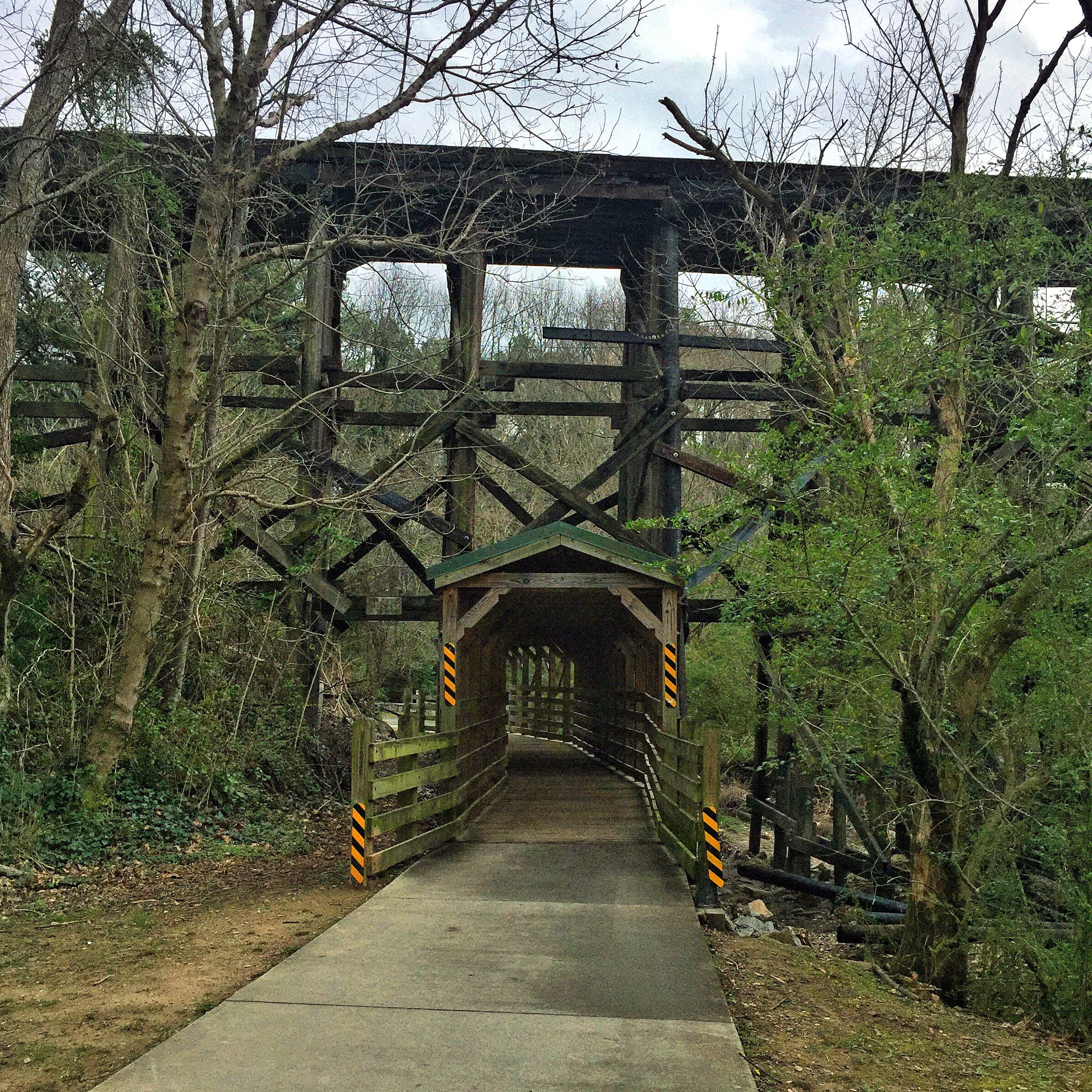
The BeltLine passing through Ardmore Park

Ardmore, sometimes called "Ardmore Park" for the city park of the same name within the neighborhood, is a neighborhood in the extreme south Buckhead area of Atlanta, between Peachtree Road, on the east, railroad tracks and the Atlanta BeltLine on the west, Collier Road to the north and Brookwood to the south. Though distinct from Brookwood and Collier Hills, the neighborhoods are often linked as they share a border and location along Collier Road and Peachtree Street/Road just north of Midtown.

== History ==
Ardmore was first settled in the 1920s, with some of the multifamily condominium buildings along Collier Road dating to 1920. The land was formerly the Collier family mill that operated along Tanyard Creek and is located on what was part of the American Civil War's Battle of Peachtree Creek. In addition to the multifamily buildings, the single-family homes that comprise a majority of the neighborhood were mostly constructed between the 1920s and 1940s along the other streets that make up the small neighborhood: 28th Street, Anjaco Road, Ardmore Road, Wycliff Road, and several smaller streets.

The land comprising the Ardmore Park neighborhood was originally owned by the Collier family, one of Atlanta's early pioneering families who arrived in Atlanta in 1823. Specifically, Andrew Jackson Collier—for whom Anjaco Road is named (the first two letters of his first, middle, and last names)—owned 202.5 acres of land off Peachtree that his heirs subdivided in the 1920s, leading to the development of the Ardmore Park neighborhood.

Collier operated an antebellum grist mill off Tanyard Creek in the area of the current Ardmore and Tanyard Creek Parks. The area is also known for being the site of some of the most hostile and bloody combat during the Civil War, as Confederate forces desperately attacked the armies commanded by Maj. Gen. William T. Sherman that were closing in on Atlanta in July 1864. Historical markers dot both Ardmore Park and Tanyard Creek Park, recounting this history.

The development of the neighborhood started in the early 1920s. At the time of initial development, the neighborhood consisted of 28th Street to just past Wycliff Road, Wycliff Anjaco Road, and Collier Road. The development of Anjaco began soon after in the 1930s, and the western half of 28th Street and Ardmore Road was developed next, largely in the 40s and 50s, coinciding with the development of the park for which the neighborhood is now named.

In 2002, the Ardmore Park Neighborhood Association lead an effort to preserve the land that is now Ardmore and Tanyard Creek Parks. In January 2023, Park Pride Atlanta announced that Ardmore Park received a $17,000 matching grant. The Ardmore Park Neighborhood Association will use the grant money to purchase new benches, tables, and garbage cans that are made of durable, long-lasting materials and creation of bike parking spaces.

In 2022, CSX Railway replaced the iconic wooden rail bridge in Ardmore Park because it reached the end of its life. The project began in the spring of 2022, and the bridge completion was expected to be completed by the end of the year, with the park restoration carrying into spring 2023. During the project, the Beltline trail between Tanyard and Ardmore was closed. The three segments of the new bridge were lifted into place from 1 am to 11 am on November 16, 17 and 18, 2022. On March 3, 2023, after CSX completed repairs and clean up, the trail between Ardmore Park and Tanyard Creek Park was reopened.

In 2022, Shepherd Center announced that the Arthur M. Blank Family Foundation had granted $50 million to fund an expansion of patient-family housing. Construction began in the fall of 2022, and the Arthur M. Blank Family Residences opened in 2024.

As part of the 2022 Moving Atlanta Forward Bond initiative, Ardmore Park secured funding to upgrade its playground equipment. The installation of the new playground took place in the spring of 2025 and the playground was reopened on July 10, 2025.

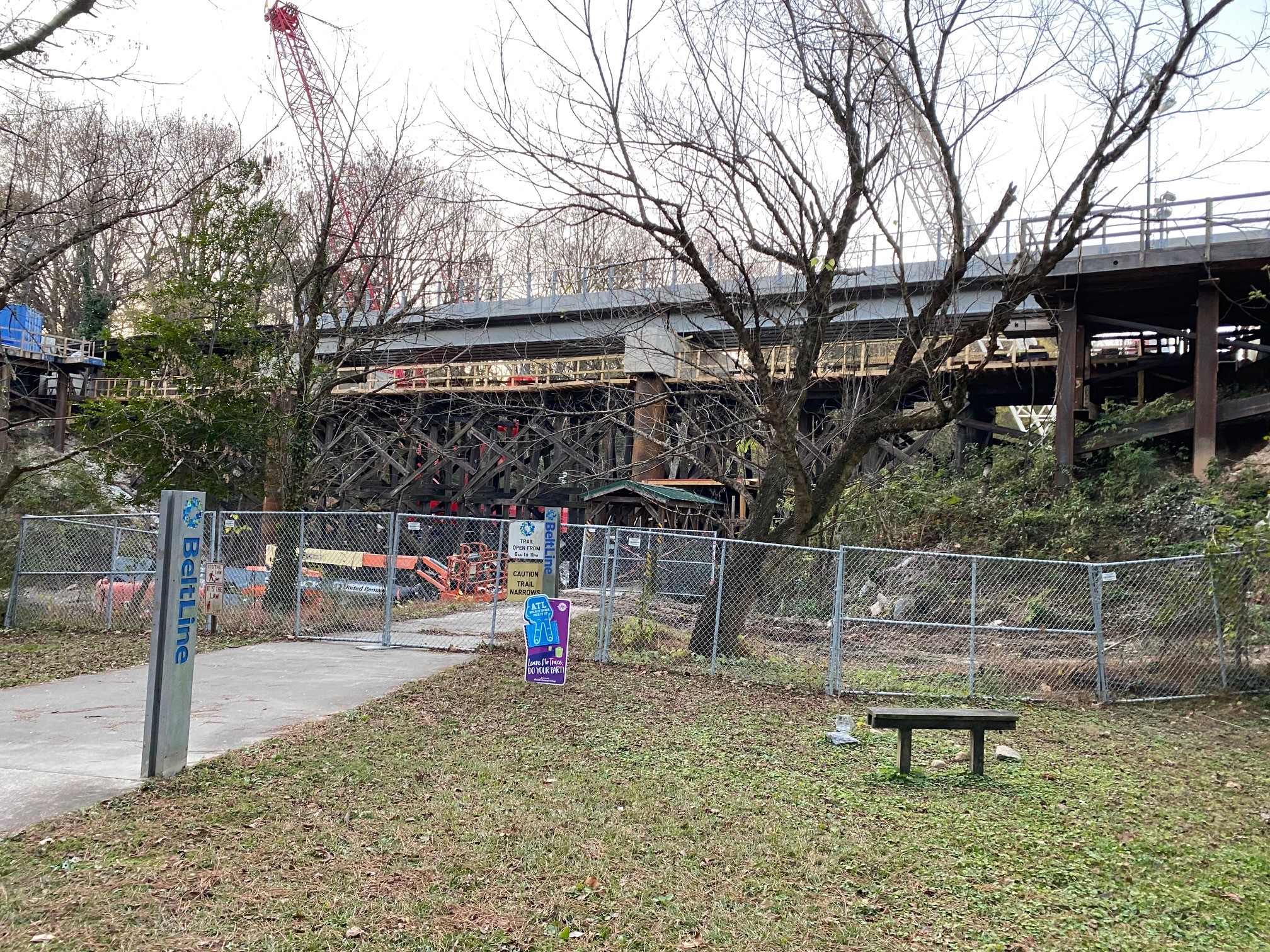
Ardmore Park Bridge 11-17-22 with two of three pieces of the new bridge in place.
