= Battle of Peachtree Creek =

1864 battle of the American Civil War

Coordinates: 33.8109°N 84.4038°W

- Part of the American Civil War
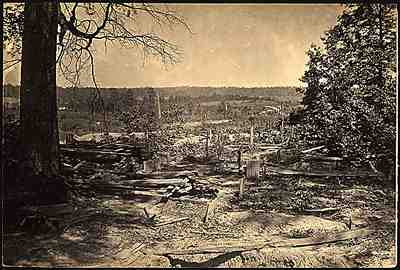
- "Few battlefields of the war have been strewn so thickly with dead and wounded as they lay that evening around Collier's Mill." (Union Major Gen. J. D. Cox)
Date	July 20, 1864
Location	Fulton County, Georgia
Result	Union victory

Belligerents
United States (Union)	Confederate States

Commanders and leaders
(United States) George H. Thomas	(Confederate States of America) John B. Hood

Units involved
Army of the Cumberland	Army of Tennessee

Strength
21,655	20,250

Casualties and losses
1,900	2,500

The Battle of Peachtree Creek was fought in Georgia on July 20, 1864, as part of the Atlanta campaign in the American Civil War. It was the first major attack by Lt. Gen. John Bell Hood since taking command of the Confederate Army of Tennessee. The attack was against Maj. Gen. William T. Sherman's Union army, which was perched on the doorstep of Atlanta. The main armies in the conflict were the Union Army of the Cumberland, commanded by Maj. Gen. George Henry Thomas and two corps of the Confederate Army of Tennessee.

== Background ==
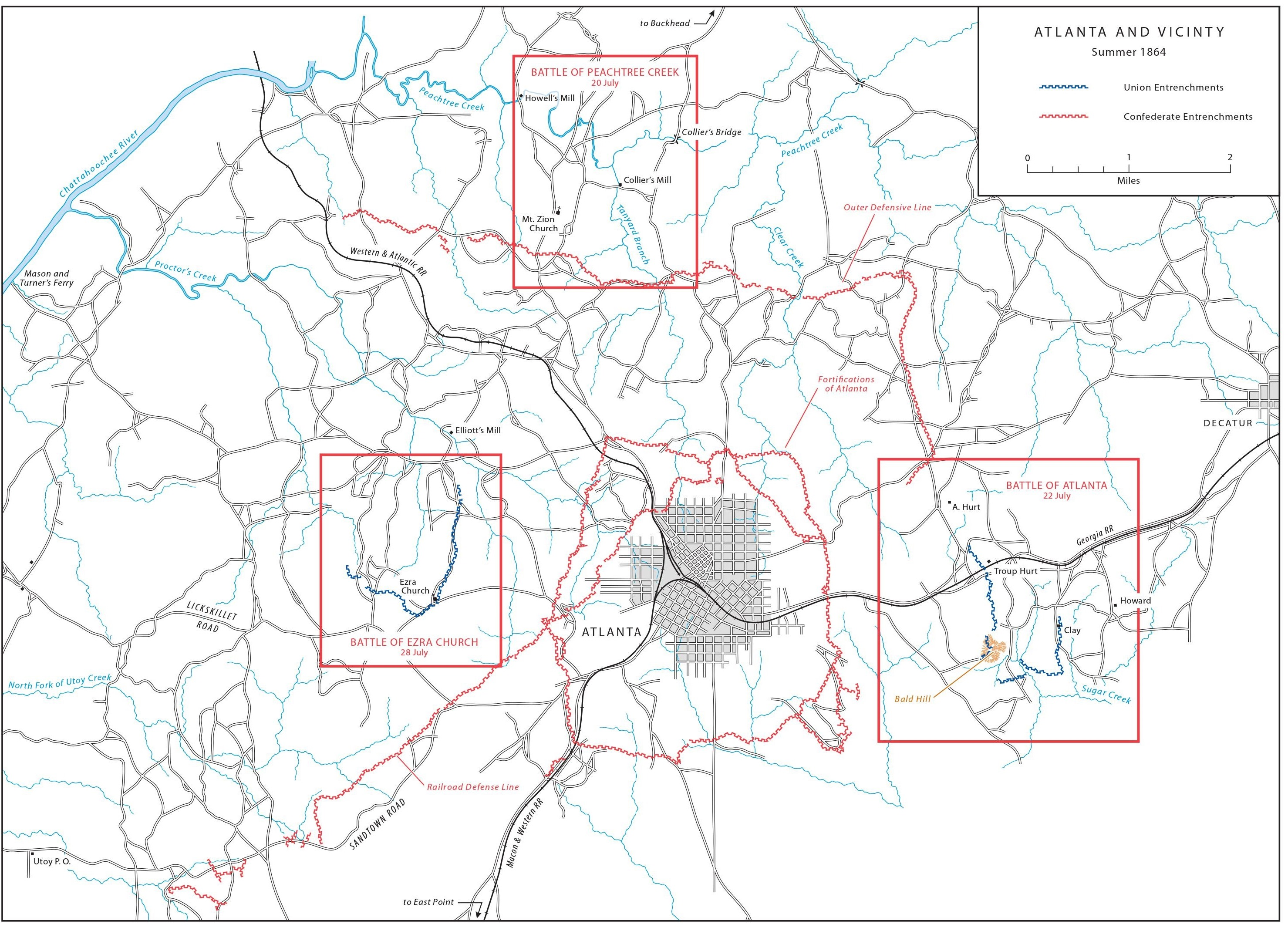
Atlanta Campaign: Atlanta and vicinity (summer 1864)

Sherman had launched his grand offensive against the Army of Tennessee in early May. For more than two months, Sherman's forces, consisting of the Army of the Cumberland, the Army of the Tennessee and the Army of the Ohio, sparred with the Confederate Army of Tennessee, then under the command of General Joseph E. Johnston. Although the Southerners gained tactical successes at the Battle of New Hope Church, the Battle of Pickett's Mill, and the Battle of Kennesaw Mountain, they were unable to counter Sherman's superior numbers. Gradually, the Union forces flanked the Confederates out of every defensive position they attempted to hold. On July 8, Union forces crossed the Chattahoochee River, the last major natural barrier between Sherman and Atlanta.

Retreating from Sherman's advancing armies, General Johnston withdrew across Peachtree Creek, just north of Atlanta, and laid plans for an attack on part of the Army of the Cumberland as it crossed Peachtree Creek. On July 17, however, he received a telegram from Confederate President Jefferson Davis relieving him from command. The political leadership of the Confederacy was unhappy with Johnston's lack of aggressiveness and replaced him with Hood. In contrast to Johnston's conservative tactics and conservation of manpower, Hood had a reputation for aggressive tactics and personal bravery on the battlefield. In fact he had already been maimed in battle twice within the past year, having personally led several assaults. Hood formally took command on July 18 and launched the attempted counter-offensive.

It was not until July 19 that Hood learned of Sherman's split armies advancing for a swift attack from multiple directions. Thomas's Army of the Cumberland was to advance directly towards Atlanta, while the Army of the Ohio under the command of Major General John M. Schofield, and the Army of the Tennessee under the command of Major General James B. McPherson quickly moved several miles towards Decatur so as to advance from the northeast. This was apparently an early premonition of Sherman's general strategy of cutting Confederate supply lines by destroying railroads to the east. Thomas would have to cross Peachtree Creek at several locations and would be vulnerable both while crossing and immediately after, before they could construct breastworks.

Hood hoped to attack Thomas while his Army of the Cumberland was still in the process of crossing Peachtree Creek. Hood also sent forth the corps under Alexander P. Stewart and William J. Hardee to meet Schofield and McPherson. By so doing, the Southerners could hope to fight with rough numerical parity and catch the Northern forces by surprise. Hood thus sought to drive Thomas west, further away from Schofield and McPherson. This would have forced Sherman to divert his forces away from Atlanta.

== Opposing forces ==
Army Commanders at Peachtree Creek
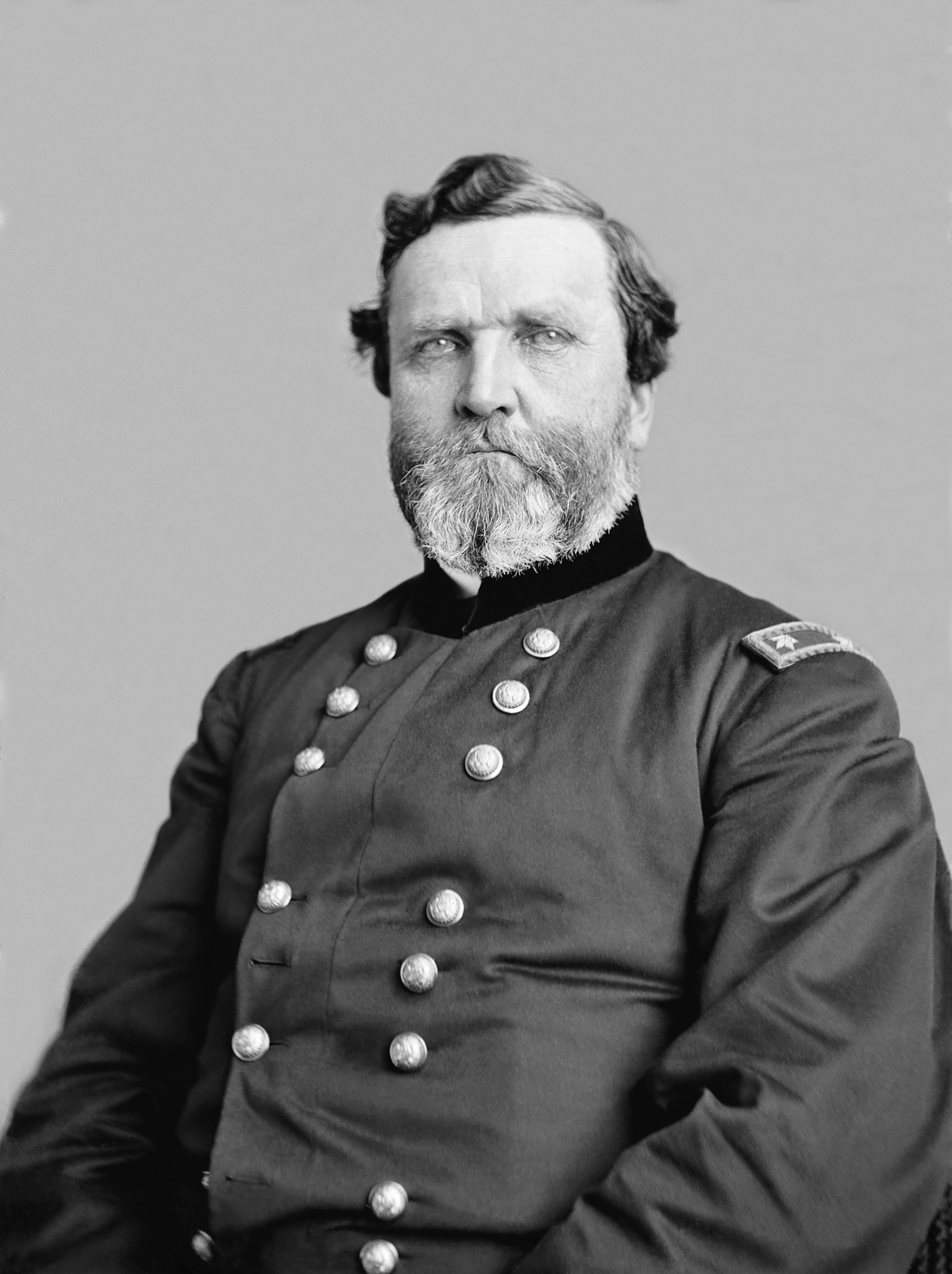
Maj. Gen.
George H. Thomas, USA

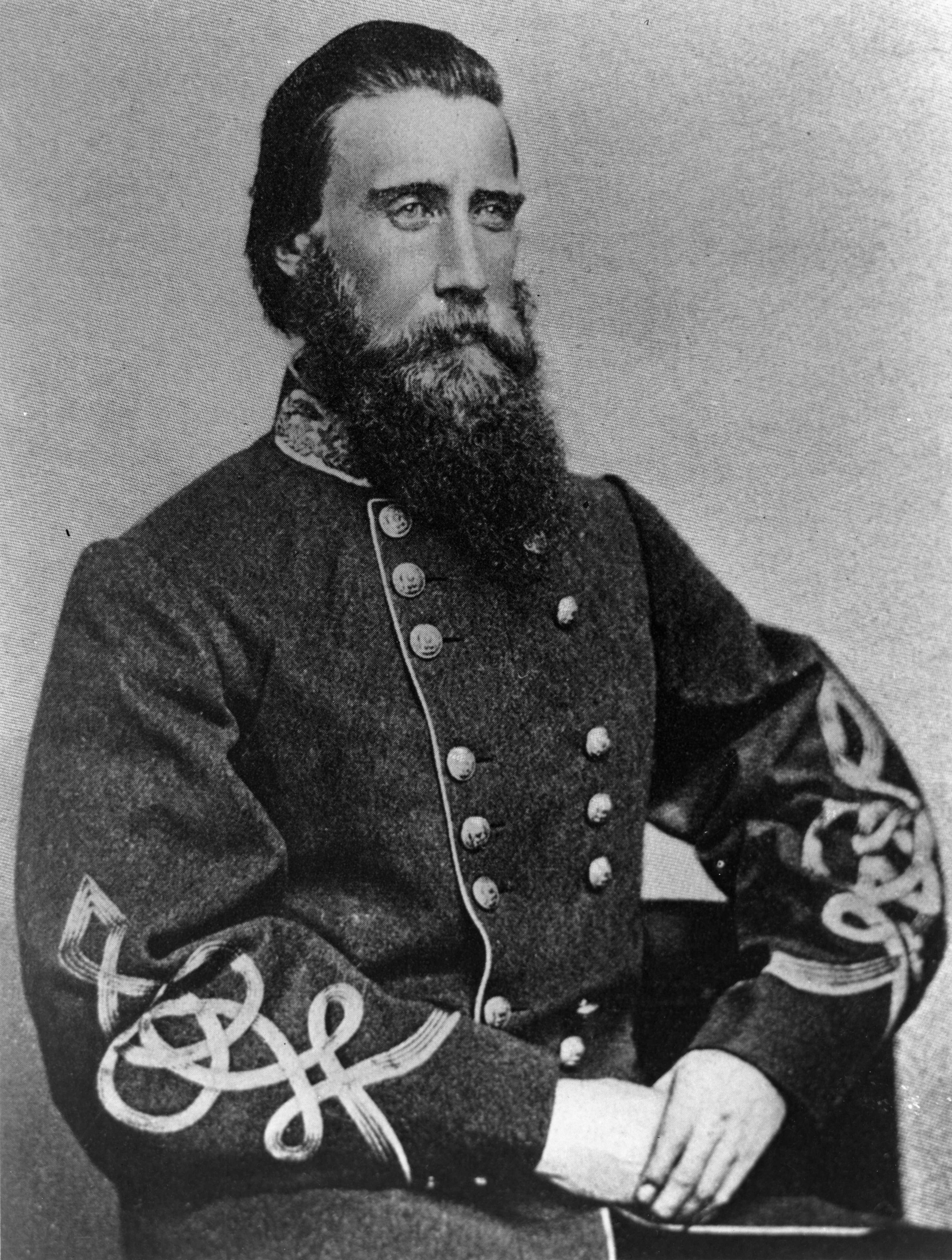
Gen.
John B. Hood, CSA

== Battle ==
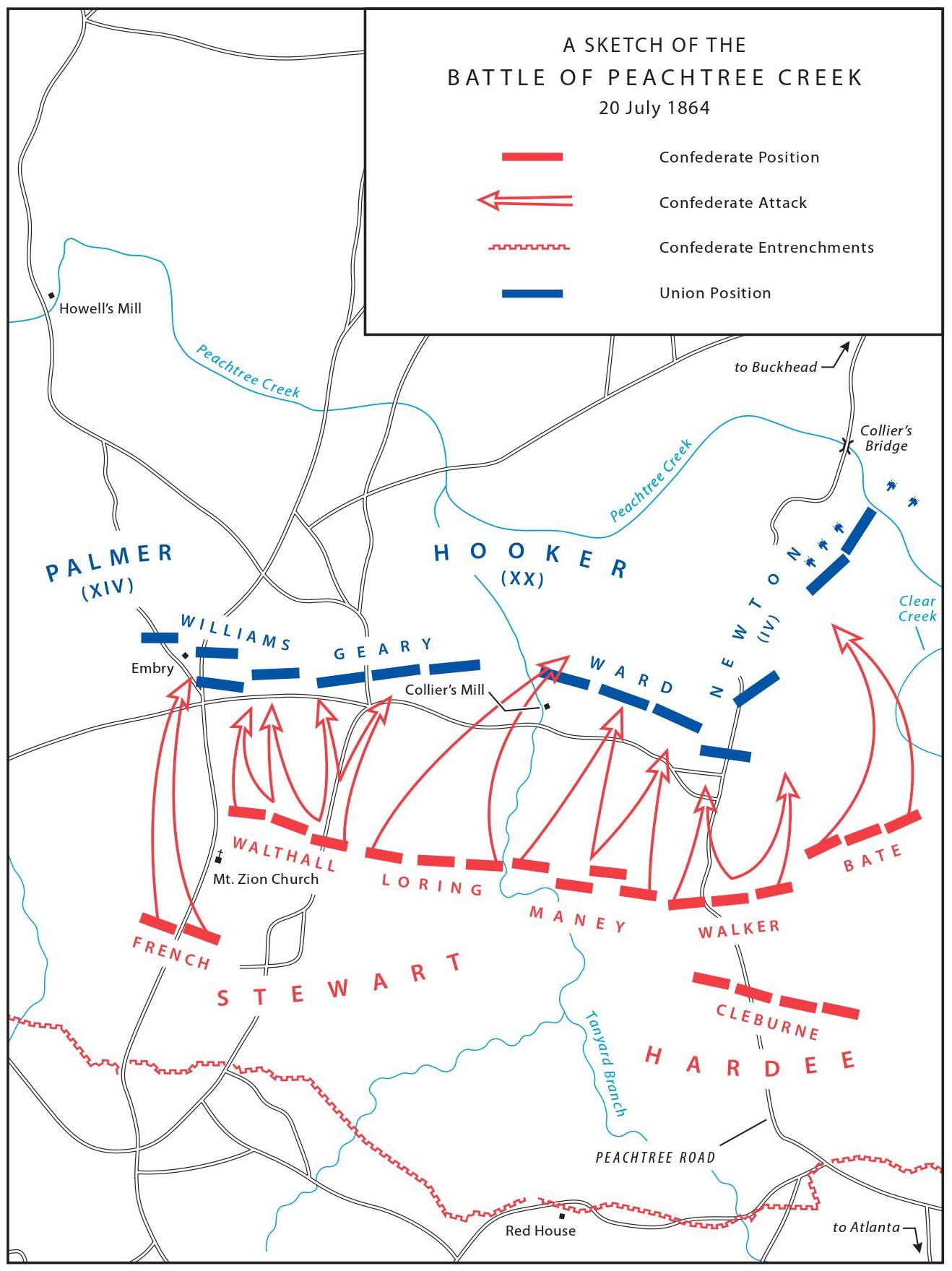
A sketch of the Battle of Peachtree Creek, July 20, 1864

Throughout the morning of July 20, the Army of the Cumberland crossed Peachtree Creek and began taking up defensive positions. The XIV Corps, commanded by Major General John M. Palmer, took position on the right. The XX Corps, commanded by Major General Joseph Hooker (the former commander of the Army of the Potomac who had lost the Battle of Chancellorsville) took position in the center. The left was held by a single division (John Newton's) of the IV Corps, as the rest of that corps had been sent to reinforce Schofield and McPherson on the east side of Atlanta. The Union forces began preparing defensive positions, but had only partially completed them by the time the Confederate attack began.

The few hours between the Union crossing and their completion of defensive earthworks were a moment of opportunity for the Confederates. Hood committed two of his three corps to the attack: Hardee's corps would attack on the right, while the corps of General Stewart would attack on the left as the corps of General Benjamin Cheatham would keep an eye on the Union forces to the east of Atlanta.

Hood had wanted the attack launched at one o'clock, but confusion and miscommunication between Hardee and Hood prevented this from happening. Hood instructed Hardee to ensure that his right flank maintained contact with Cheatham's corps, but Cheatham began moving his forces slightly eastward. Hardee too began side-stepping to the east to maintain contact with Cheatham, while Stewart began sliding eastward as well in order to maintain contact with Hardee. It was not until three o'clock that this movement ceased.

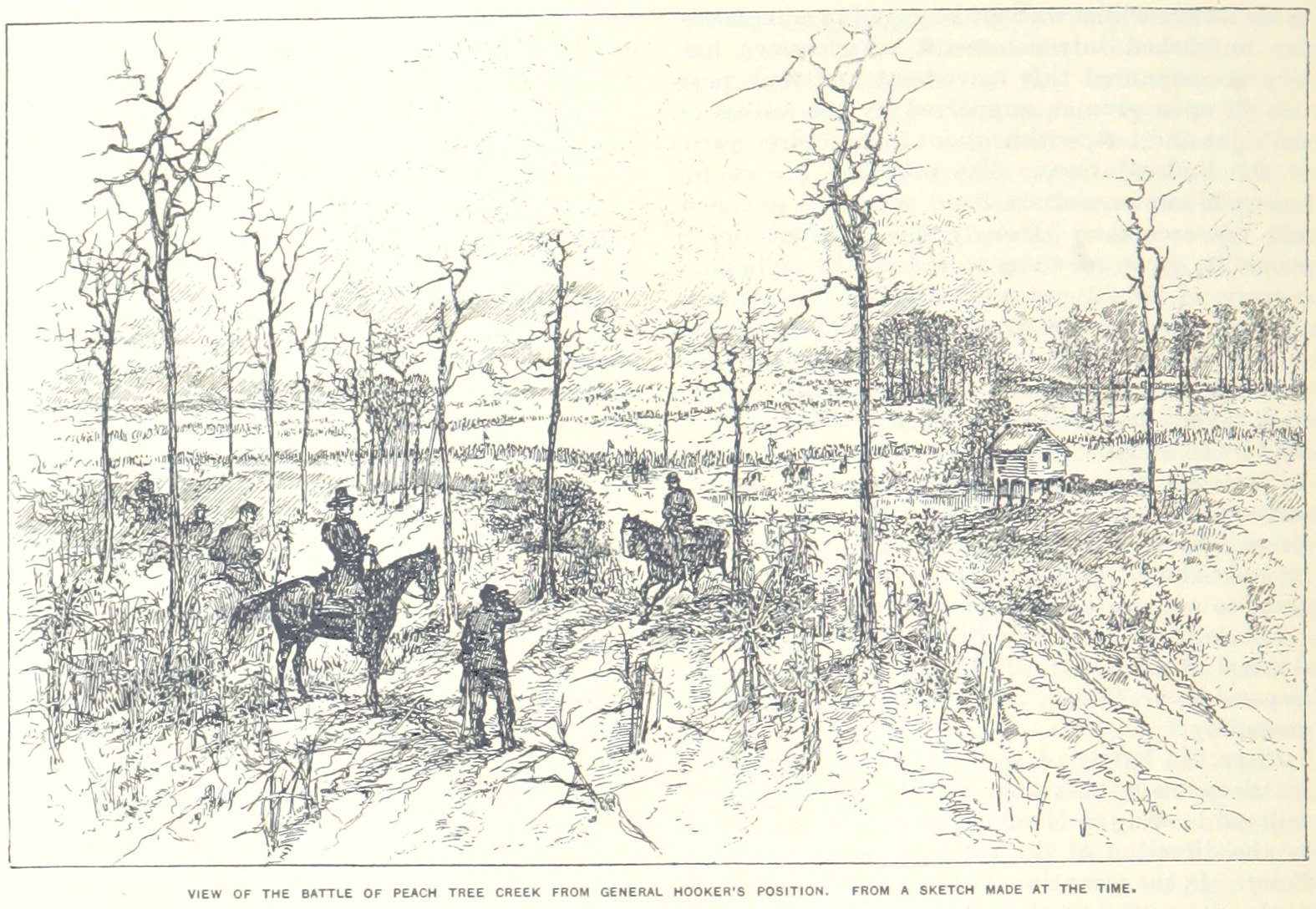
The battle as seen from General Hooker's position

The Confederate attack was finally mounted at around four o'clock in the afternoon. On the Confederate right, Hardee's men ran into fierce opposition and were unable to make much headway, with the Southerners suffering heavy losses. The failure of the attack was largely due to faulty execution and a lack of pre-battle reconnaissance.

On the Confederate left, Stewart's attack was more successful. Two Union brigades were forced to retreat, and most of the 33rd New Jersey Infantry Regiment (along with its battle flag) were captured by the Rebels, as was a 4-gun Union artillery battery. Union forces counterattacked and after a bloody struggle, successfully blunted the Confederate offensive. Artillery helped stop the Confederate attack on Thomas' left flank.

A few hours into the battle, Hardee was preparing to send in his reserve, the division of General Patrick Cleburne, which he hoped would get the attack moving again and allow him to break through the Union lines. An urgent message from Hood, however, forced him to cancel the attack and dispatch Cleburne to reinforce Cheatham, who was being threatened by a Union attack and in need of reinforcements.

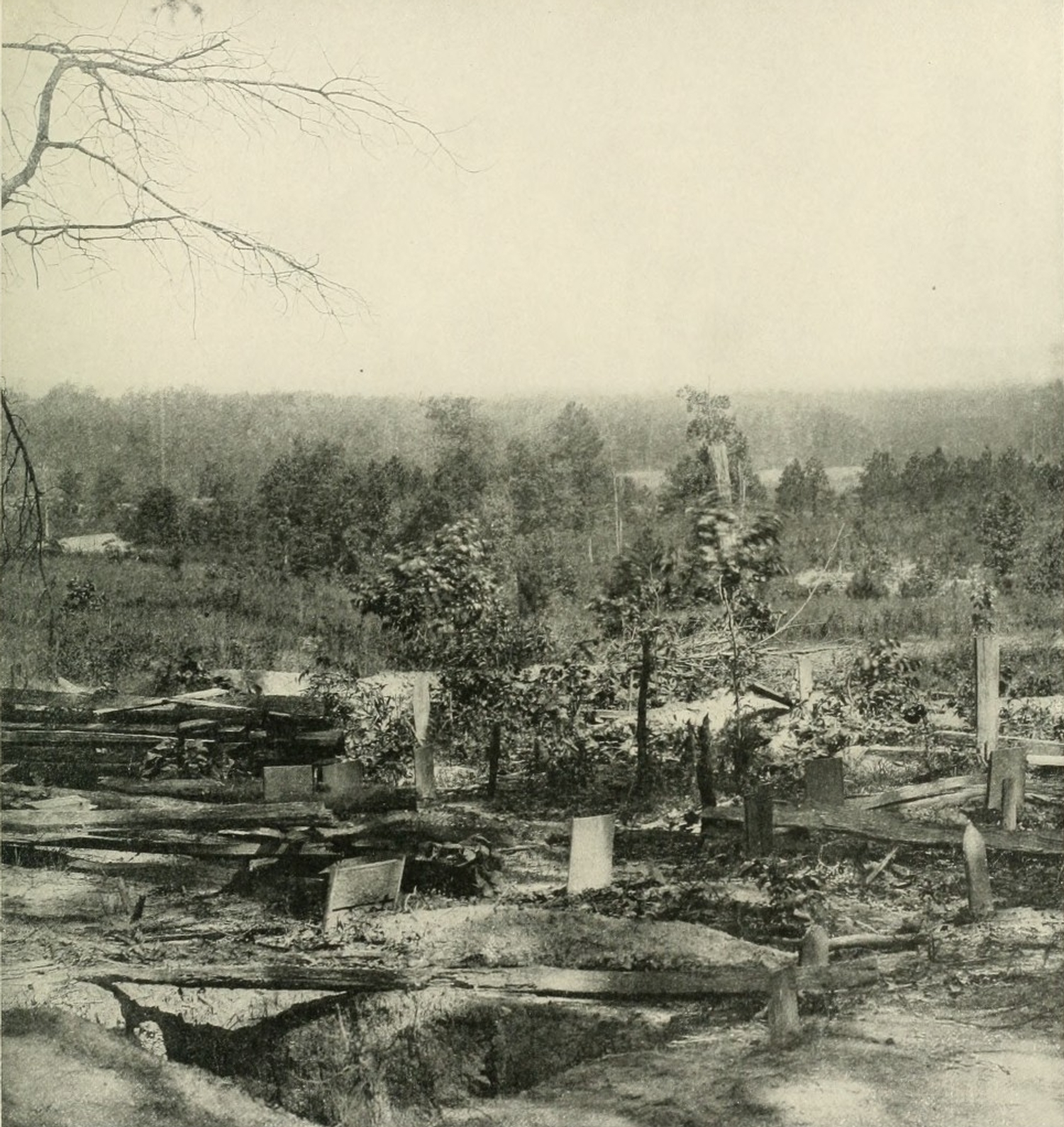
Union graves close to where the soldiers fell after the Confederates under John B. Hood attacked at Peachtree Creek

The Union lines had bent but not broken under the weight of the Confederate attack, and by the end of the day the rebels had failed to break through anywhere along the line. Hood withdrew into defenses of Atlanta the following day, 21 July. Estimated casualties were 4,250 in total: 1,750 on the Union side and at least 2,500 on the Confederate.

== Appraisal ==
Many historians have criticized the Confederacy's tactics and execution, especially Hood's and Hardee's. Johnston, although fighting defensively, had already determined to counterattack at Peachtree Creek; in fact, the plan for striking the Army of the Cumberland as it began to cross Peachtree Creek has been attributed to him. His long rear-guard retreat from the Battle of Kennesaw Mountain is understandable, as Sherman used his numerical superiority for constant large flanking movements. Although he had lost an enormous amount of ground, Johnston had whittled Sherman's numerical superiority from 2:1 to 8:5.

Replacing him with the brash Hood, practically on the eve of battle, has generally been regarded as a mistake. Hood, as well as several other generals, sent a telegram to Davis seeking a remand of the order, advising Davis that it would be "dangerous to change the commander of this army at this particular time." Although Hood's general plan was plausible, the federal forces being divided, the failure of the units to be formed and positioned prior to the Union river crossing, Hardee's failure to commit his troops fully and Hood's decision to continue the attack when he had discovered he had lost his advantage resulted in a severe and predictable defeat.

== Medals of Honor ==
Lieutenant Colonel Douglas Hapeman was awarded the Medal of Honor for "extraordinary heroism on 20 July 1864, while serving with 104th Illinois Infantry, in action at Peach Tree Creek, Georgia. With conspicuous coolness and bravery Lieutenant Colonel Hapeman rallied his men under a severe attack, re-formed the broken ranks, and repulsed the attack."

First Lieutenant Frank D. Baldwin, Company D, 19th Michigan Infantry, was awarded the Medal of Honor for gallantry at the Battle of Peachtree Creek, Georgia, July 20, 1864. Under a galling fire moved ahead of his own men, and singly entered the enemy's line, capturing and bringing back two commissioned officers, fully armed, besides a guidon of a Georgia regiment.

Private Denis Buckley was awarded the Medal of Honor for "extraordinary heroism on 20 July 1864, while serving with Company G, 136th New York Infantry, in action at Peach Tree Creek, Georgia, for capture of flag of 31st Mississippi (Confederate States of America)."

== Legacy ==
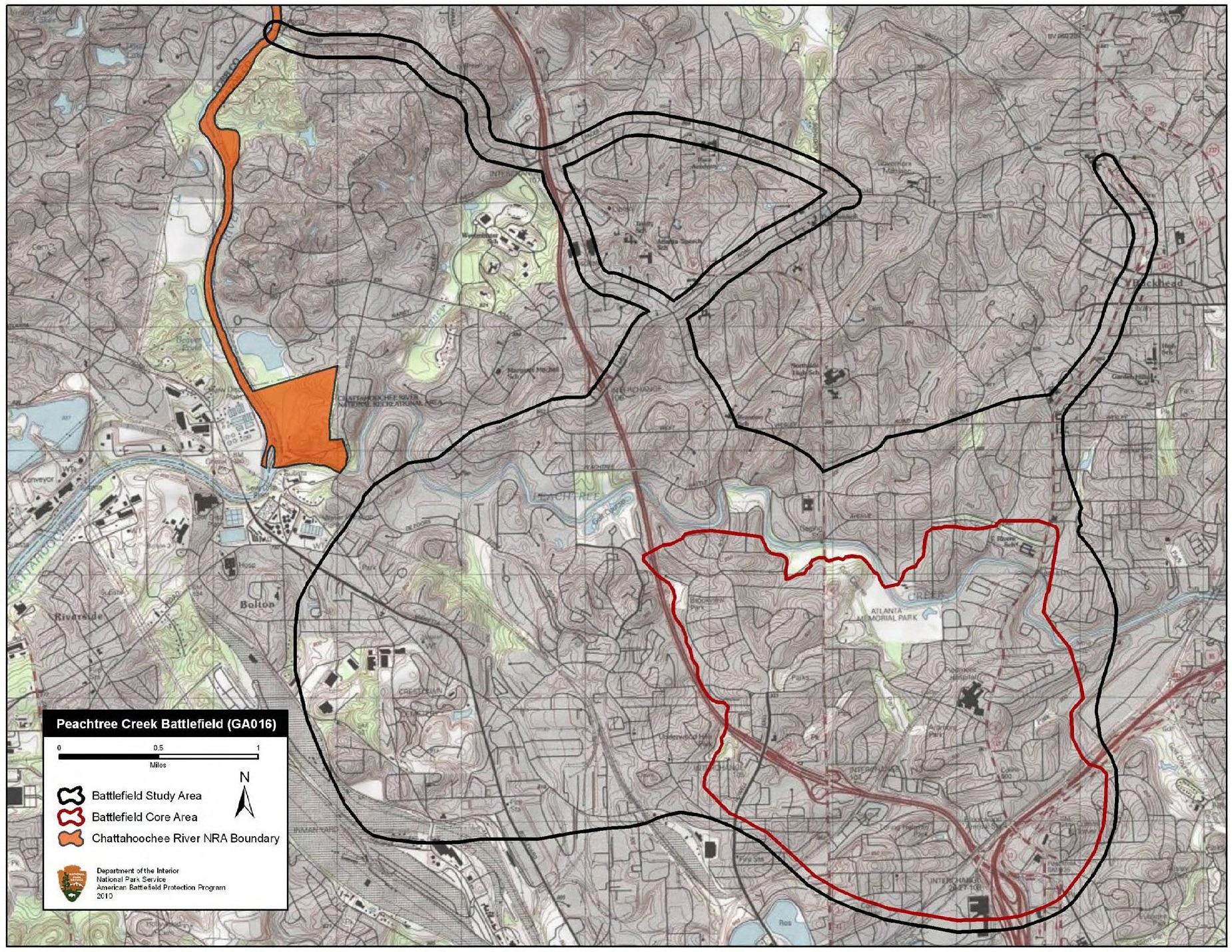
Map of Peachtree Creek Battlefield core and study areas by the American Battlefield Protection Program

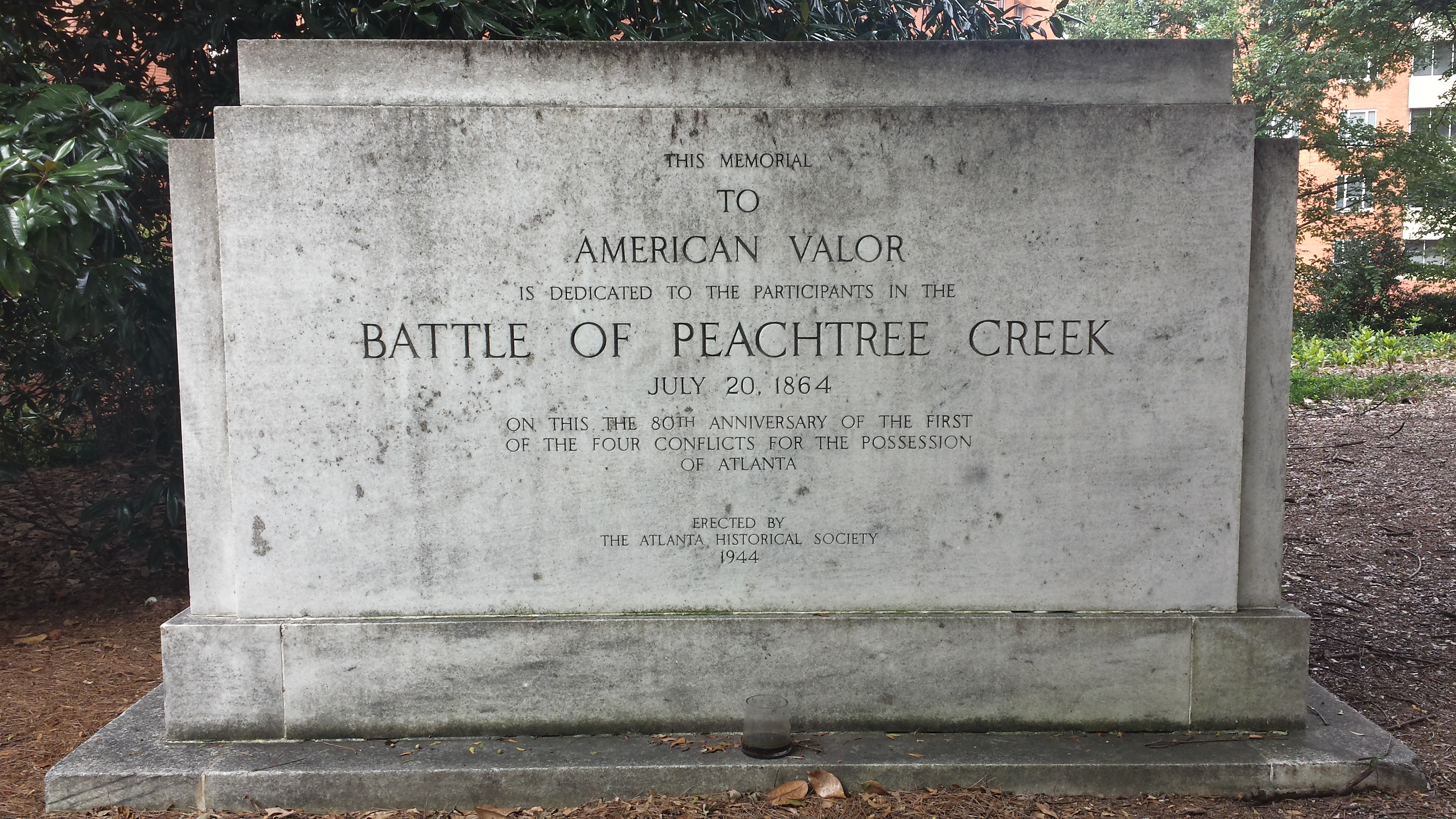
"Memorial to American Valor" in 1944 on the 80th anniversary of the Battle of Peachtree Creek

The battlefield is now largely lost to urban development. Tanyard Creek Park occupies what was near the center of the battle and contains several memorial markers. Peachtree Battle Avenue commemorates the battle. All are located in the western part of Buckhead, the northern section of the city which was annexed in 1952. The play Peachtree Battle is a comedy about life in the upscale area.

== In popular culture ==
- The plot of the alternate history novel Shattered Nation: An Alternate History Novel of the American Civil War, by Jeffrey Evan Brooks, centers around the Battle of Peachtree Creek. In the novel, the Army of Tennessee fights the battle with Johnston, rather than Hood, in command.
- It was discovered, on Who Do You Think You Are?, that Matthew Broderick's great, great-grandfather, Robert Martindale, was killed in this battle.

== See also ==
- Troop engagements of the American Civil War, 1864
- Battle of Atlanta
- List of costliest American Civil War land battles
