= Brookwood, Atlanta =

Neighborhood of Atlanta, Georgia

Coordinates: 33°48′06″N 84°23′51″W

Brookwood is a neighborhood at the southernmost tip of the Buckhead Community of Atlanta. It should not be confused with Brookwood Hills, a neighborhood and historic district east of Brookwood across Peachtree Road.

It is bordered by:

- I-75 and Loring Heights on the southwest
- I-85 on the southeast
- Peachtree Road and Brookwood Hills on the east
- Ardmore on the north
- BeltLine rail corridor at the far west

There is an infill residential area at the "back" of the neighborhood (Semel Drive area).

The BeltLine trail through Tanyard Creek Park continues south through the Tanyard Creek Urban Wilderness, which together with the trail terminates at the infill development at the far "back" (west side) of the Brookwood neighborhood.
