= Brookwood Hills =

- Brookwood Hills Historic District
- U.S. National Register of Historic Places
- U.S. Historic district
- Location within Atlanta Location within Georgia Location within the United States
- Location: Atlanta, Georgia
- Coordinates: 33°48′21″N 84°23′23″W
- Built: 1922
- Architect: Burdette Realty; Kauffman, O.F.
- Architectural style: Classical Revival, Bungalow/Craftsman, Tudor Revival
- NRHP reference No.: 79003776
- Added to NRHP: December 21, 1979

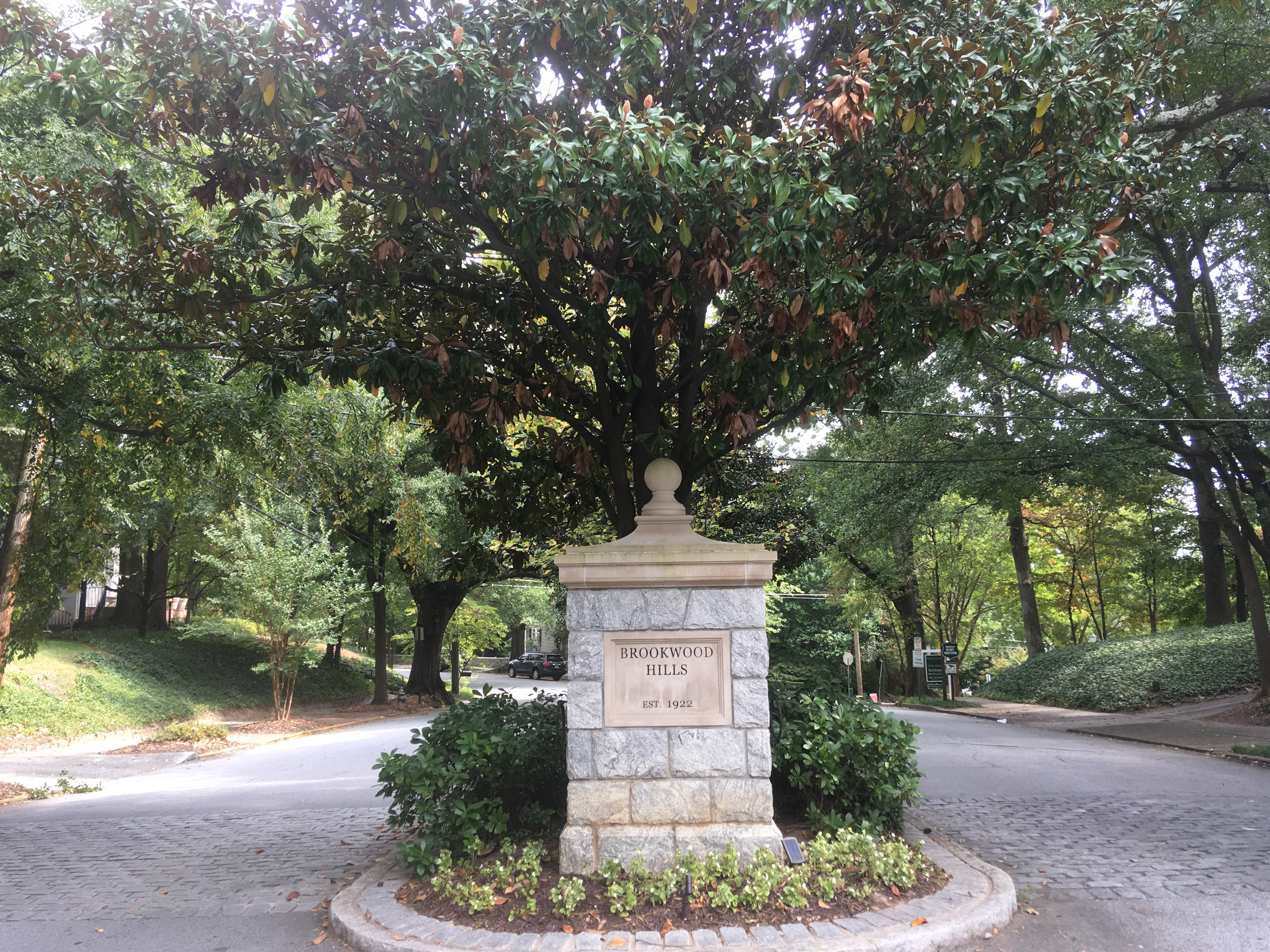

Brookwood Hills is a historic neighborhood located in intown Atlanta, Georgia, United States, north of Midtown and south-southwest of Buckhead. Home to about 1,000 people, it was founded in the early 1920s by Benjamin Franklin Burdett and his son, Arthur. The site of the neighborhood is located where some of the bloodiest battles of the American Civil War took place during the Atlanta campaign.

== Location ==
Brookwood Hills is located near the heart of Atlanta, only a few miles away from the skyscrapers of its major business districts. It is connected by three entrances to Peachtree Road, and has no other outlet. Brookwood Hills is bordered roughly by Peachtree on the west, Interstate 85 on the south, the Norfolk Southern and MARTA tracks (just south of Peachtree Creek) to the north, and Clear Creek to the east.

The Brookwood neighborhood, for which Brookwood Hills was named, is located immediately southwest of the southern tip of Brookwood Hills. This is in turn immediately north of the major freeway interchange called the "Brookwood split", which joins I-75 to the northwest and I-85 to the northeast into the Downtown Connector to the south.

The Brookwood Hills Community Club (BWHCC) also owns the park and pool in the center of Brookwood Hills.

== History and development ==
Brookwood Hills was the creation of the Burdett family. Benjamin first created the neighborhood on the Battlefield of Peachtree Creek owned by himself and local Thomas Collier. The streets were built in accordance with the hilly terrain, instead of grid form, as was popular at the time. Mr. Burdett planted oak saplings during Brookwood Hills' founding, which now stand tall and are the trademark quality of the neighborhood. The area developed by Benjamin and Arthur Burdett is now registered as the Brookwood Hills Historic District.

In November 2011 the City of Atlanta began a project to repair damaged sidewalks and curbs in front of approximately 50 homes in the neighborhood.

== Brookwood Hills Community Club ==
The hub of the community is the Brookwood Hills Community Club, which includes a park, pool, two pavilions, tennis courts, and basketball goals. Many neighborhood-sponsored events like the Fourth of July parade and the annual Easter egg hunt take place here.

== Brookwood Hills Bullfrogs ==
The Brookwood Hills pool hosts its own swim team. Their mascot is a bullfrog. This team competes in the Atlanta Swim Association summer league. They start practices in late April, and compete through the end of June or beginning of July. Every year, they compete at Georgia Tech for the Atlanta Swim Association championships. In 2013, Brookwood Hills won both their division and the overall championship title. More recently, Brookwood Hills won the Division 4 Championship in 2022 and 2023. They received second place in Division 4 in 2021.

== Notable current and past residents ==
- Vern Yip
- Kathryn Stockett
- Robert Shaw (conductor)
- Ed Helms
- Patrik Stefan

== Schools ==
=== Public ===
Brookwood Hills is covered by Atlanta Public Schools, and is in the school attendance district of:

- E. Rivers Elementary School
- Sutton Middle School
- North Atlanta High School

=== Private ===
Popular private schools in the area include:

- Woodward Academy
- The Westminster Schools
- The Lovett School
- Pace Academy
- Christ the King Catholic School
- The Galloway School
- Holy Innocents' Episcopal School
- Marist School
- Atlanta International School
