= Collier Hills =

Neighborhood of Atlanta, Georgia

Coordinates: 33°48′27″N 84°24′20″W

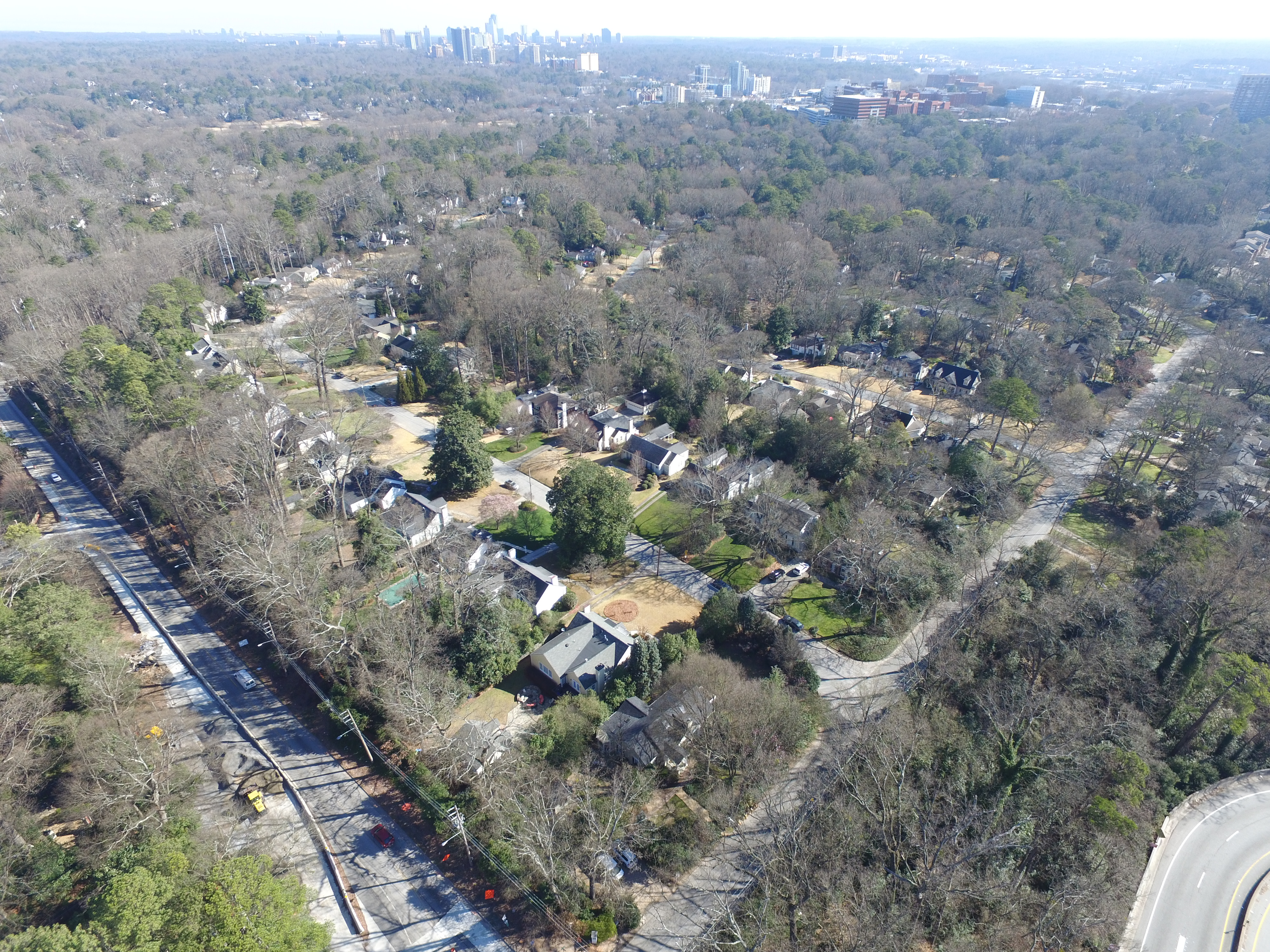
Collier Hills from Northside Drive / Echota intersection looking towards Buckhead

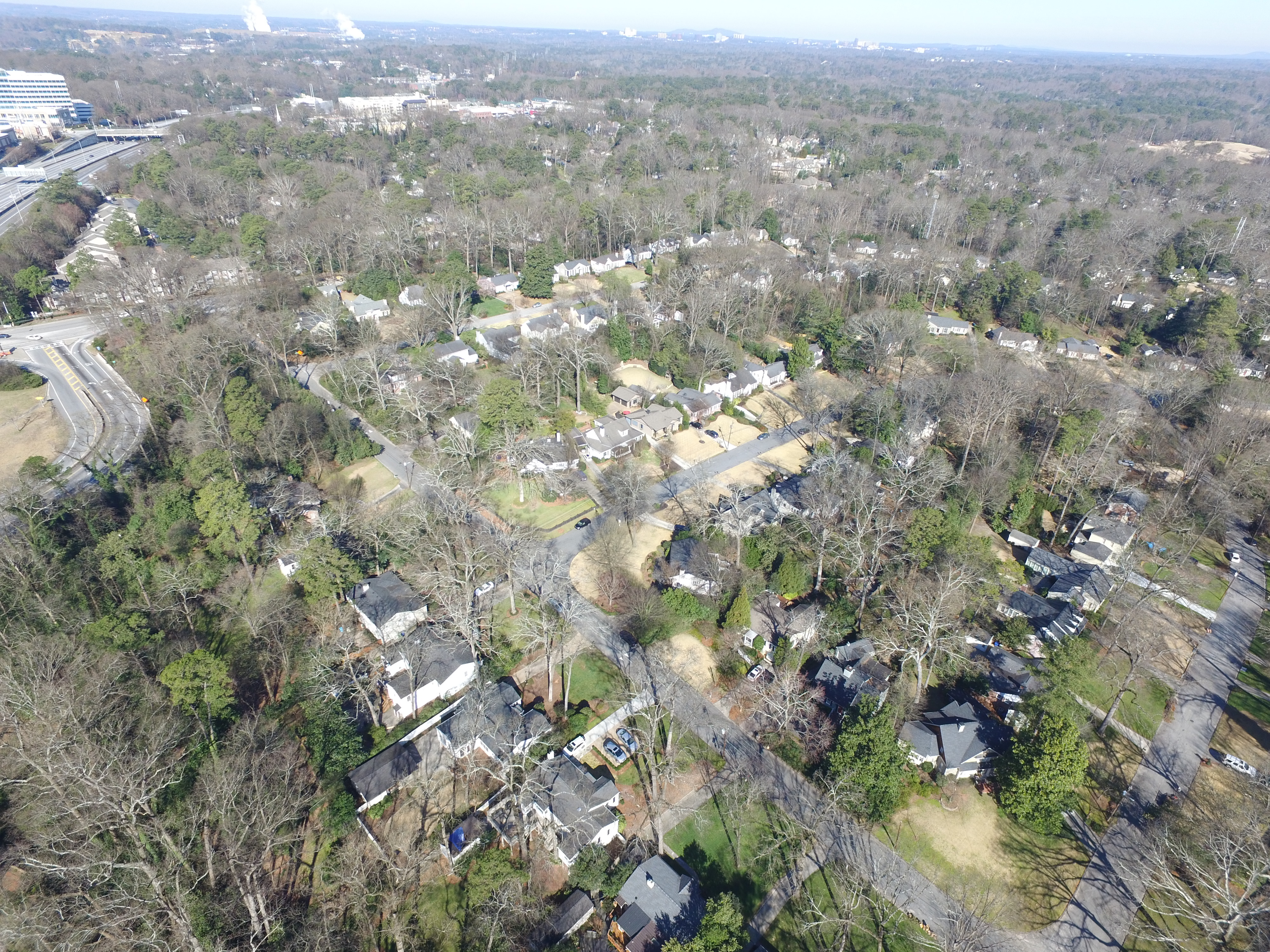
Collier Hills from I75/CSX intersection looking towards Vinings

Collier Hills is a residential neighborhood in Atlanta, Georgia. The area gets its name from the family whose homestead was broadly located in the southwest corner of the intersection of Peachtree St. and Collier Rd. Andrew Jackson Collier, a member of this family and early pioneer of the area, operated an antebellum grist mill off Tanyard Creek, near Collier Rd.
